= Members of the Queensland Legislative Assembly, 1923–1926 =

This is a list of members of the 23rd Legislative Assembly of Queensland from 1923 to 1926, as elected at the 1923 state election held on 12 May 1923.

During the term, the United Party (formerly the National Party) and the Country Party merged to form the Country and Progressive National Party, which became the main conservative party until the late 1930s.

Name	Party	Electorate	Term in office
John Appel	United/CPNP	Albert	1908–1929
George Barber	Labor	Bundaberg	1901–1935
George Barnes	United/CPNP	Warwick	1908–1935
Walter Barnes	United/CPNP	Wynnum	1901–1915, 1918–1933
Randolph Bedford^{[1]}	Labor	Warrego	1923–1941
Ernest Bell	United/CPNP	Fassifern	1913–1930
Hon William Bertram	Labor	Maree	1912–1929
William Brand	Country/CPNP	Burrum	1920–1950
Hon Frank Brennan^{[3]}	Labor	Toowoomba	1918–1925
Harry Bruce	Labor	Kennedy	1923–1950
Frank Bulcock	Labor	Barcoo	1919–1942
George Carter	Labor	Port Curtis	1915–1920, 1923–1929
Harry Clayton	Country/CPNP	Wide Bay	1920–1946
Charles Collins	Labor	Bowen	1909–1912, 1915–1936
Charles Conroy	Labor	Maranoa	1920–1944
Frank Cooper	Labor	Bremer	1915–1946
William Cooper	Labor	Rosewood	1918–1929
Bernard Corser	Country/CPNP	Burnett	1912–1928
Edward Costello	Country/CPNP	Carnarvon	1920–1935
Harry Coyne^{[1]}	Labor	Warrego	1908–1923
John Dash	Labor	Mundingburra	1920–1944
William Deacon	Country/CPNP	Cunningham	1920–1943
Hon Thomas Dunstan	Labor	Gympie	1915–1929, 1935–1953
Jim Edwards	Country/CPNP	Nanango	1920–1947
Cecil Elphinstone	United/CPNP	Oxley	1918–1929
George Farrell	Labor	Rockhampton	1923–1929
Myles Ferricks	Labor	South Brisbane	1909–1912, 1920–1929
Tom Foley	Labor	Leichhardt	1919–1960
James Fry	United/CPNP	Kurilpa	1918–1932
John Gilday	Labor	Ithaca	1912–1926
Hon William Gillies^{[5]}	Labor	Eacham	1912–1925
Hon David Gledson	Labor	Ipswich	1915–1929, 1932–1949
Ted Hanson^{[2]}	Labor	Buranda	1924–1947
Harry Hartley	Labor	Fitzroy	1915–1929
Hon John Huxham^{[2]}	Labor	Buranda	1908–1909, 1912–1924
Maurice Hynes	Labor	Townsville	1923–1939
Hon Alfred Jones	Labor	Paddington	1904–1909, 1915–1917, 1922–1932
William Kelso	United/CPNP	Nundah	1923–1932
Jim Kerr	United/CPNP	Enoggera	1920–1932
Reginald King	United/CPNP	Logan	1920–1935
Mick Kirwan	Labor	Brisbane	1912–1932
Edward Land	Labor	Balonne	1904–1927
James Larcombe	Labor	Keppel	1912–1929, 1932–1956
Evan Llewelyn^{[3]}	Labor	Toowoomba	1925–1929, 1932–1935
William Lloyd	Labor	Kelvin Grove	1915–1920, 1923–1929
George Logan	Country/CPNP	Lockyer	1920–1929
Hon William McCormack	Labor	Cairns	1912–1930
Peter McLachlan	Labor	Merthyr	1908–1912, 1915–1920, 1923–1929
James Maxwell	United/CPNP	Toowong	1920–1938
Arthur Moore	Country/CPNP	Aubigny	1915–1941
Godfrey Morgan	Country/CPNP	Murilla	1909–1938
Hon John Mullan	Labor	Flinders	1908–1912, 1918–1941
Frederick Nott	Country/CPNP	Stanley	1920–1927
John O'Keefe^{[4]}	Labor	Chillagoe	1926–1929, 1930–1942
John Payne	Labor	Mitchell	1905–1928
Percy Pease	Labor	Herbert	1920–1940
Jens Peterson	United/CPNP	Normanby	1915–1935
Andrew Petrie	United	Toombul	1893–1926
George Pollock	Labor	Gregory	1915–1939
Darby Riordan	Labor	Burke	1918–1929
Robert Roberts	United/CPNP	East Toowoomba	1907–1934
Cornelius Ryan^{[5]}	Labor	Eacham	1926–1929
Henry Ryan	Labor	Cook	1915–1929
Hubert Sizer	United/CPNP	Sandgate	1918–1935
Hon William Forgan Smith	Labor	Mackay	1915–1942
Hon James Stopford	Labor	Mount Morgan	1915–1936
Edward Swayne	Country/CPNP	Mirani	1907–1935
Charles Taylor	United/CPNP	Windsor	1918–1935
Hon Ted Theodore^{[4]}	Labor	Chillagoe	1909–1925
William Vowles	Country/CPNP	Dalby	1911–1926
Harry Walker	Country/CPNP	Cooroora	1907–1947
Richard Warren	United/CPNP	Murrumba	1918–1932
David Weir	Labor	Maryborough	1917–1929
William Wellington	Labor	Charters Towers	1915–1939
Hon Thomas Wilson	Labor	Fortitude Valley	1916–1933
Vern Winstanley	Labor	Queenton	1908–1932
Harry Wright	Labor	Bulimba	1923–1929

^{1} On 31 July 1923, the Labor member for Warrego, Harry Coyne, resigned and was appointed to the bench of the Queensland Land Court. Labor candidate Randolph Bedford won the resulting by-election on 13 October 1923.
^{2} On 31 July 1924, the Labor member for Buranda, John Huxham, resigned to take up an appointment as Agent-General for Queensland in London. Labor candidate Ted Hanson won the resulting by-election on 16 August 1924.
^{3} On 26 February 1925, the Labor member for Toowoomba, Frank Brennan, resigned following his appointment to the Supreme Court of Queensland. Labor candidate Evan Llewelyn won the resulting by-election on 4 April 1925.
^{4} On 22 September 1925, the Labor member for Chillagoe and former Premier of Queensland, Ted Theodore, resigned to stand for the seat of Herbert at the 1925 federal election. Labor candidate John O'Keefe won the resulting by-election on 16 January 1926.
^{5} On 24 October 1925, the Labor member for Eacham and Premier of Queensland, William Gillies, resigned to become a member of the new trade and arbitration board. Labor candidate Cornelius Ryan won the resulting by-election on 16 January 1926.

== See also ==
- 1923 Queensland state election
- Theodore Ministry (Labor) (1919–1925)
- Gillies Ministry (Labor) (1925)
- McCormack Ministry (Labor) (1925–1929)
