= Gillies ministry =

The Gillies Ministry was the 29th ministry of the Government of Queensland and was led by Premier William Gillies of the Labor Party. It succeeded the Theodore Ministry on 26 February 1925 following Ted Theodore's resignation, and was in turn succeeded by the McCormack Ministry on 22 October 1925 when Gillies resigned to become a member of the new trade and arbitration board.

On 26 February 1925, the Governor, Sir Matthew Nathan, designated nine principal executive offices of the Government, and appointed the following Members of the Legislative Assembly of Queensland to the Ministry.

Office	Minister
Premier; Chief Secretary; Treasurer	William Gillies
Deputy Premier; Secretary for Public Lands	William McCormack
Secretary for Mines	Alfred Jones
Attorney-General	John Mullan
Secretary for Railways	James Larcombe
Secretary for Agriculture and Stock	William Forgan Smith
Home Secretary	James Stopford
Secretary for Public Works	Mick Kirwan
Secretary for Public Instruction	Thomas Wilson
Minister without portfolio	Thomas Dunstan

Preceded by Theodore Ministry	Gillies Ministry; 1919–1925	Succeeded by McCormack Ministry
