= Theodore ministry =

28th ministry of the Government of Queensland

The Theodore Ministry was the 28th ministry of the Government of Queensland and was led by Premier Ted Theodore of the Labor Party. It succeeded the Ryan Ministry on 22 October 1919 following T. J. Ryan's resignation from the Queensland parliament to run for federal politics, and was in turn succeeded by the Gillies Ministry on 26 February 1925 when Theodore followed his predecessor into federal politics.

== First Ministry ==
On 22 October 1919, the Governor, Sir Hamilton Goold-Adams, designated eight principal executive offices of the Government, and appointed the following Members of the Parliament of Queensland to the Ministry.

Office	Minister
Premier; Chief Secretary; Treasurer (until 9 March 1920)	Ted Theodore
Deputy Premier; Treasurer (from 9 March 1920) (until 7 April 1920:) Minister of Justice Secretary for Railways (from 7 April 1920:) Attorney-General Secretary for Public Works	John Fihelly
Secretary for Mines	Alfred Jones, MLC
Secretary for Agriculture and Stock	William Gillies
Home Secretary	William McCormack
Secretary for Public Lands	Harry Coyne
Secretary for Public Instruction	John Huxham
Secretary for Public Works (until 7 April 1920); Secretary for Railways (from 7 April 1920)	James Larcombe
Minister without portfolio	John Mullan

== Second Ministry ==
The ministry was reconstituted on 12 November 1920 following the 1920 election.

Office	Minister
Premier; Chief Secretary; Treasurer (from 8 February 1922); Secretary for Public Works (8 February – 6 October 1922)	Ted Theodore
Deputy Premier; Treasurer; Secretary for Public Works	John Fihelly (until 8 February 1922)
Secretary for Agriculture and Stock	William Gillies
Home Secretary	William McCormack
Secretary for Mines	Alfred Jones, MLC
Attorney-General	John Mullan
Secretary for Railways	James Larcombe
Secretary for Public Lands	Harry Coyne
Secretary for Public Instruction	John Huxham
Minister without portfolio (until 6 October 1922); Secretary for Public Works (from 6 October 1922)	William Forgan Smith (from 16 December 1920)
Minister without portfolio	James Stopford (from 6 October 1922)

== Third Ministry ==
On 2 July 1923, the Governor, Sir Matthew Nathan, designated nine principal executive offices of the Government, and appointed the following Members of the Parliament of Queensland to the Ministry.

Office	Minister
Premier; Chief Secretary; Treasurer	Ted Theodore
Deputy Premier; Secretary for Agriculture and Stock	William Gillies
Secretary for Public Lands	William McCormack
Secretary for Mines	Alfred Jones
Attorney-General	John Mullan
Secretary for Railways	James Larcombe
Secretary for Public Instruction	John Huxham (until 14 July 1924)
Secretary for Public Works	William Forgan Smith
Home Secretary	James Stopford
Minister without portfolio (until 14 July 1924); Secretary for Public Instruction (from 14 July 1924)	Frank Brennan
Minister without portfolio	Mick Kirwan (from 14 July 1924)

Preceded by Ryan Ministry	Theodore Ministry; 1919–1925	Succeeded by Gillies Ministry
