= Moore ministry (Queensland) =

The Moore Ministry was a ministry of the Government of Queensland and was led by Country and Progressive National Party (CPNP) Premier Arthur Edward Moore. It succeeded the McCormack Ministry on 21 May 1929, ten days after William McCormack's Labor government was defeated at the 1929 state election. The ministry was followed by the Forgan Smith Ministry on 18 June 1932 after the CPNP were defeated by Labor at the 1932 state election a week earlier.

On 21 May 1929, the Governor, Sir John Goodwin, designated 10 principal executive offices of the Government, and appointed the following Members of the Legislative Assembly of Queensland to the Ministry as follows:

Office	Minister
Premier; Chief Secretary	Arthur Edward Moore
Secretary for Public Instruction; Secretary for Public Works	Reginald King
Treasurer	Walter Barnes
Home Secretary	Jens Peterson
Attorney-General	Neil MacGroarty
Secretary for Public Lands	William Deacon
Secretary for Agriculture and Stock	Harry Walker
Secretary for Railways^{[1]}	Godfrey Morgan
Secretary for Labour and Industry	Hubert Sizer
Secretary for Mines	Ernest Atherton

^{1} The role of Secretary for Railways was restyled Minister for Transport on 28 January 1932.

Preceded by McCormack Ministry	Moore Ministry; 1929–1932	Succeeded by Forgan Smith Ministry
