= Neil MacGroarty =

Australian politician

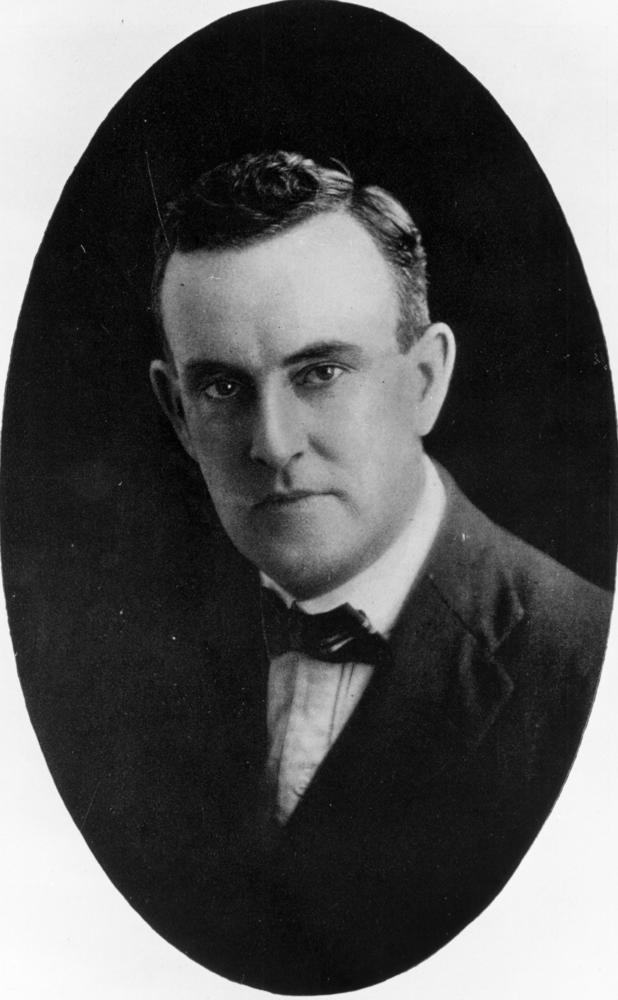

Attorney-General of Queensland
- In office 21 May 1929 – 17 Jun 1932
- Premier: Arthur Moore
- Preceded by: John Mullan
- Succeeded by: John Mullan
- Constituency: South Brisbane

Member of the Queensland Legislative Assembly for South Brisbane
- In office 11 May 1929 – 11 June 1932
- Preceded by: Myles Ferricks
- Succeeded by: Vince Gair

Personal details
- Born: Neil Francis MacGroarty; 1 May 1888 Brisbane, Queensland, Australia
- Died: 10 August 1971 (aged 83) South Brisbane, Queensland, Australia
- Resting place: Toowong Cemetery
- Party: Country and Progressive National Party
- Spouse: Doreen Mary Joseph (m. 1929)
- Occupation: Solicitor

Neil Francis MacGroarty (1 May 1888 – 10 August 1971) was a solicitor and a member of the Queensland Legislative Assembly.

== Early life ==
MacGroarty was born in Jane Street, South Brisbane, Queensland, to Irish-born parents Daniel Cannon MacGroarty, inspector of schools, and his wife Anna Maria (née Kearney). Educated at St Joseph's College, Gregory Terrace and Nudgee College, he entered into articles of clerkship with Patrick O'Sullivan before being admitted as a solicitor of the Supreme Court of Queensland in 1911. MacGroarty became O'Sullivan's business partner for eight years and in 1919 he transferred to the bar where he practiced from the old Inns of Court building in Adelaide Street.

== Political career ==
At the 1929 election, MacGroarty, the Country and Progressive National Party candidate, defeated Labor's Myles Ferricks to win the seat of South Brisbane. He was immediately appointed attorney general and in his maiden speech he attracted controversy when, after being interjected, he stated that the Queensland Court of Industrial Arbitration would be "ringbarked" as soon as possible.

In April 1930, a Royal Commission was held into the purchase of the Mungana mines and Chillagoe smelters by the Queensland Government in what became known as the Mungana affair. The former owners included Peter Goddard and Fred Reid as well as then Queensland Premier, Ted Theodore and future Premier, Bill McCormack. Macgroarty opened the crown submissions and, after the commissioner, former Justice James Campbell, found the transactions to be fraudulent, MacGroarty, for the crown, sued the four men for £30,000 damages before Chief Justice Sir James Blair of the Supreme Court of Queensland. The four member jury went on to find in favour of the defendants.

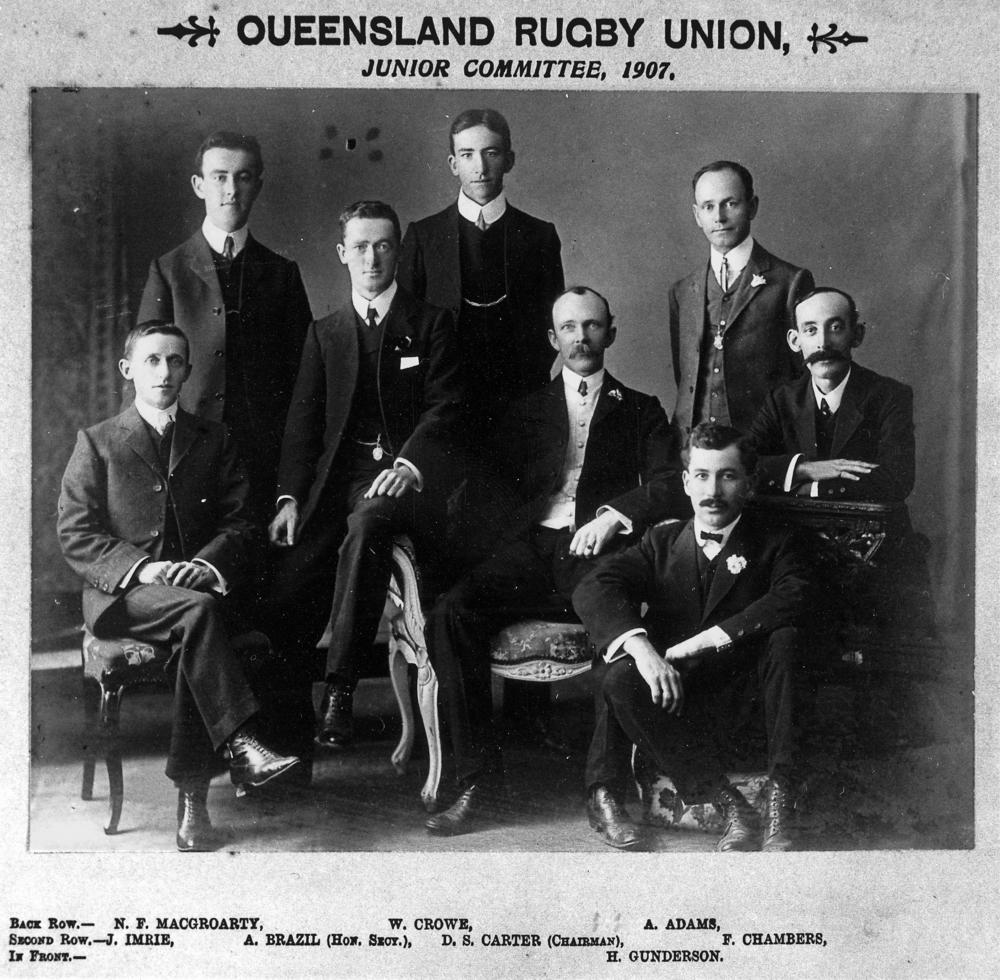
Queensland Rugby Union Junior Committee, 1907. MacGroarty is on the left of the back row.

In his time as attorney general MacGroarty introduced the Companies Act of 1931, and the controversial Judicial Proceedings (Regulations of Reports) Act of 1931. The latter was regarded as an attempt to protect public morals, but was seen by the Labor Party as a personal vendetta against Brisbane Truth newspaper. By the time of the 1932 election, MacGroarty had fallen out with important Catholic elements and lost his seat to Labor's Vince Gair. Macgroarty left politics bitterly disillusioned and resumed his law practice until his retirement.

== Personal life ==
On 21 December 1929, MacGroarty married Doreen Mary Joseph (died 1985) at St. Mary's Catholic Church, South Brisbane and together had three sons and two daughters. He was captain of the senior football team at Nudgee College and executive-member of the Queensland Rugby Union.

A former president of the Queensland Irish Association and a member of the Johnsonian Club, MacGroarty died at South Brisbane in August 1971. His funeral proceeded from St Ignatius' Church, Toowong, to the Toowong Cemetery.

Political offices
Preceded by John Mullan	Attorney-General of Queensland; 1929–1932	Succeeded by John Mullan
Parliament of Queensland
Preceded by Myles Ferricks	Member for South Brisbane; 1929–1932	Succeeded by Vince Gair
