= 1929 Queensland state election =

- 11 May 1929

All 72 seats in the Legislative Assembly of Queensland 37 Assembly seats were needed for a majority
- Turnout: 89.15 (▲0.42 pp)
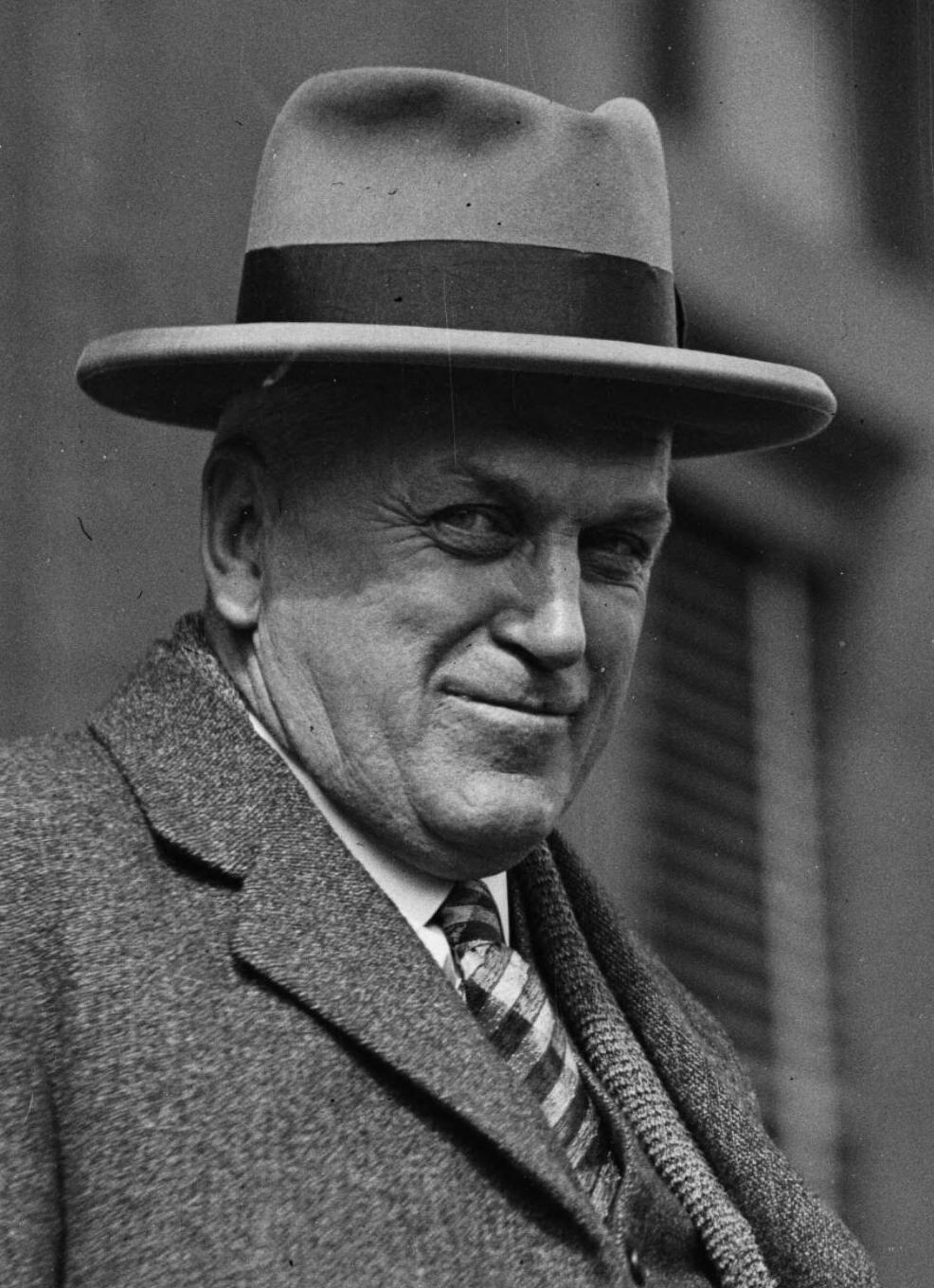

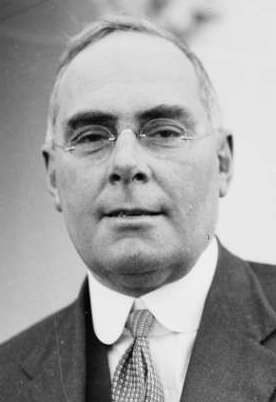
	First party	Second party
Leader	Arthur Edward Moore	William McCormack
Party	CPNP	Labor
Leader since	19 April 1924	22 October 1925
Leader's seat	Aubigny	Cairns
Last election	28 seats, 48.48%	43 seats, 47.96%
Seats won	43	27
Seat change	▲15	▼16
Popular vote	233,977	173,242
Percentage	54.24%	40.16%
Swing	▲5.03	▼7.80
Premier before election
William McCormack
Labor
Elected Premier
Arthur Edward Moore
CPNP

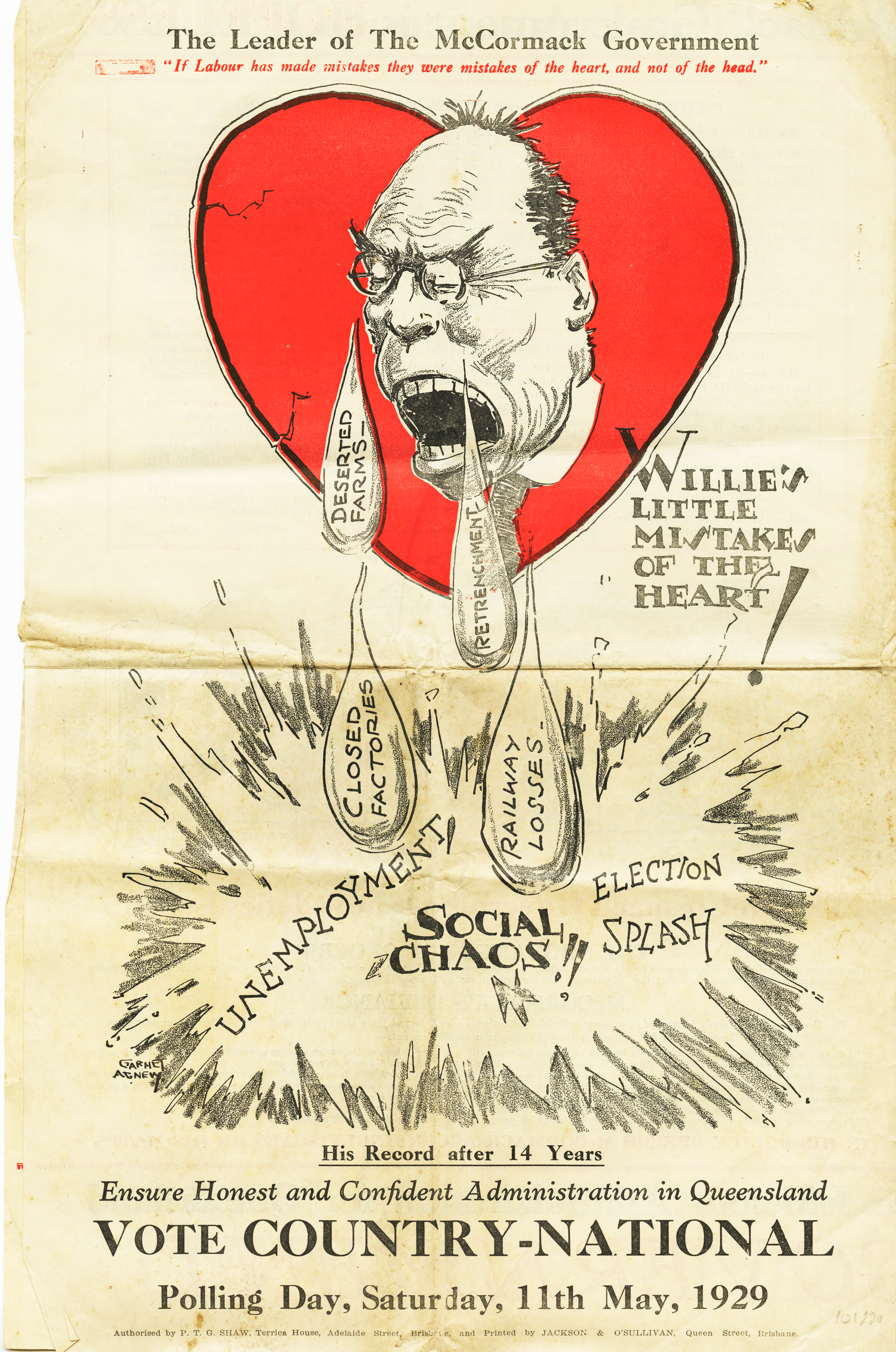
CPNP poster attacking McCormack

Elections were held in the Australian state of Queensland on 11 May 1929 to elect the 72 members of the state's Legislative Assembly. In this election, Irene Longman became the first woman to both stand and be elected into the Queensland Parliament.

The Labor government was seeking its sixth continuous term in office since the 1915 election; it would be Premier William McCormack's second election. His main opponent was the Country and Progressive National Party (CPNP), led by Arthur Edward Moore. The term had not gone well for McCormack's government, including a railway lock-out in 1927 which pitted the Labor Party against the union movement, restrictive financial policies and attempts to sell off state-owned enterprises, as well as suggestions of corruption which later came to be known as the Mungana affair.

The election resulted in the defeat of the McCormack government in a landslide, and the first non-Labor ministry since 1915.

== Key dates ==
Date	Event
11 April 1929	The Parliament was dissolved.
12 April 1929	Writs were issued by the Governor to proceed with an election.
19 April 1929	Close of nominations.
11 May 1929	Polling day, between the hours of 8am and 6pm.
21 May 1929	The McCormack Ministry resigned and the Moore Ministry was sworn in.
15 June 1929	The writ was returned and the results formally declared.
29 June 1929	The writ was returned for the seat of Gregory.
20 August 1929	Parliament resumed for business.

== Results ==
The election saw the defeat of the Labor government by the CPNP.

Queensland state election, 11 May 1929 Legislative Assembly << 1926–1932 >>
Enrolled voters	491,589^{[1]}				
Votes cast	438,248		Turnout	89.15%	+0.42
Informal votes	6,836		Informal	1.56%	+0.33
Summary of votes by party
Party	Primary votes	%	Swing	Seats	Change
CPNP	233,977	54.23%	+5.03	43	+15
Labor	173,242	40.16%	–7.80	27	–16
Communist	2,890	0.67%	+0.67	0	± 0
Independent	21,303	4.94%	+3.33	2	+ 1
Total	431,412			72	

Popular vote
CPNP	54.23%
Labor	40.16%
Communist	0.67%
Independents	4.94%

Seats
CPNP	59.72%
Labor	37.50%
Independents	2.78%

^{1} 517,466 electors were enrolled to vote at the election, but 4 seats (5.6% of the total) were uncontested—2 Labor seats (3 less than 1926) representing 9,041 enrolled voters and two CPNP seats (one more than 1926) representing 16,536 enrolled voters.

== Seats changing party representation ==
This table lists changes in party representation at the 1929 election.

Seat	Incumbent member	Party	New member	Party
Bulimba	Harry Wright	Labor	Irene Longman	CPNP
Chillagoe	John O'Keefe	Labor	Ernest Atherton	CPNP
Cook	Henry Ryan	Labor	James Kenny	CPNP
Dalby	Wilfred Russell	Independent	Wilfred Russell	CPNP
Eacham	Cornelius Ryan	Labor	George Duffy	CPNP
Fitzroy	Harry Hartley	Labor	William Carter	CPNP
Gympie	Thomas Dunstan	Labor	Vivian Tozer	CPNP
Ipswich	David Gledson	Labor	James Walker	CPNP
Kelvin Grove	William Lloyd	Labor	Richard Hill	CPNP
Keppel	James Larcombe	Labor	Owen Daniel	CPNP
Lockyer	George Logan	CPNP	Charles Jamieson	Independent
Maree	William Bertram	Labor	George Tedman	CPNP
Merthyr	Peter McLachlan	Labor	Patrick Kerwin	CPNP
Port Curtis	George Carter	Labor	Frank Butler	CPNP
Rockhampton	George Farrell	Labor	Thomas Dunlop	Independent
Rosewood	William Cooper	Labor	Ted Maher	CPNP
South Brisbane	Myles Ferricks	Labor	Neil MacGroarty	CPNP
Toowoomba	Evan Llewelyn	Labor	James Annand	CPNP

== Post-election pendulum ==
Note: from 1892 until 1942, Queensland used contingency voting, which was similar to the modern optional preferential voting system. In electorates with 3 or more candidates, preferences were not distributed if a candidate received more than 50% of the primary vote.

CPNP seats (43)
Marginal
Toowoomba	James Douglas Annand	CPNP	1.3%
Bulimba	Irene Longman	CPNP	1.8%
Cook	James Kenny	CPNP	2.8%
Chillagoe	Ernest Atherton	CPNP	2.9%
Kurilpa	James Fry	CPNP	3.0%
Murrumba	Richard Warren	CPNP	4.0% v IND
Kelvin Grove	Richard Hill	CPNP	4.4%
Gympie	Vivian Tozer	CPNP	4.5%
Sandgate	Hubert Sizer	CPNP	5.4%
South Brisbane	Neil MacGroarty	CPNP	5.4%
Port Curtis	Frank Butler	CPNP	5.6%
Fairly Safe
Warwick	George Barnes	CPNP	6.0%
Rosewood	Ted Maher	CPNP	6.6%
Ipswich	James Walker	CPNP	6.9%
Keppel	Owen Daniel	CPNP	7.0%
Maree	George Tedman	CPNP	7.0%
Merthyr	Patrick Kerwin	CPNP	7.0%
Murilla	Godfrey Morgan	CPNP	7.1%
Mirani	Edward Swayne	CPNP	8.5%
Nanango	Jim Edwards	CPNP	9.2% v IND
Fitzroy	William Carter	CPNP	9.8%
Safe
Burnett	Robert Boyd	CPNP	10.0%
Burrum	William Brand	CPNP	10.2%
Eacham	George Duffy	CPNP	10.2%
Carnarvon	Edward Costello	CPNP	10.7%
Normanby	Jens Peterson	CPNP	12.6%
Windsor	Charles Taylor	CPNP	13.5%
Oxley	Thomas Nimmo	CPNP	14.2%
Logan	Reginald King	CPNP	14.8%
Aubigny	Arthur Edward Moore	CPNP	15.1% v IND
Dalby	Wilfred Russell	CPNP	15.9%
Enoggera	James Stevingstone Kerr	CPNP	16.8%
Nundah	William Kelso	CPNP	17.1%
Wynnum	Walter Barnes	CPNP	18.3%
East Toowoomba	Robert Roberts	CPNP	19.7%
Very Safe
Albert	Tom Plunkett	CPNP	23.0%
Toombul	Hugh Russell	CPNP	23.5%
Toowong	James Francis Maxwell	CPNP	23.8%
Wide Bay	Harry Clayton	CPNP	24.6% v IND
Stanley	Ernest Grimstone	CPNP	24.7% v IND
Cunningham	William Deacon	CPNP	27.9% v IND
Cooroora	Harry Walker	CPNP	unopp.
Fassifern	Ernest Bell	CPNP	unopp.

Labor seats (27)
Marginal
Brisbane	Mick Kirwan	ALP	0.3%
Bundaberg	George Philip Barber	ALP	1.1%
Queenton	Vern Winstanley	ALP	1.1%
Bremer	Frank Arthur Cooper	ALP	1.2%
Buranda	Ted Hanson	ALP	1.3%
Bowen	Charles Collins	ALP	1.6%
Ithaca	Ned Hanlon	ALP	1.8%
Maryborough	David Weir	ALP	2.0%
Mount Morgan	James Stopford	ALP	2.4%
Maranoa	Charles William Conroy	ALP	2.4%
Fortitude Valley	Thomas Wilson	ALP	3.7%
Charters Towers	William Wellington	ALP	4.0%
Townsville	Maurice Hynes	ALP	4.5%
Kennedy	Harry Bruce	ALP	5.4%
Fairly Safe
Leichardt	Tom Foley	ALP	6.0%
Cairns	William McCormack	ALP	6.6%
Herbert	Percy Pease	ALP	7.5%
Warrego	Randolph Bedford	ALP	7.7%
Mackay	William Forgan Smith	ALP	7.9%
Mitchell	Richard Bow	ALP	8.4%
Safe
Balonne	Samuel Brassington	ALP	13.9%
Burke	Darby Riordan	ALP	15.8%
Flinders	John Mullan	ALP	16.2%
Very Safe
Paddington	Alfred James Jones	ALP	21.6% v CPA
Mundingburra	John Dash	ALP	31.5% v CPA
Barcoo	Frank Bulcock	ALP	unopp.
Gregory	George Pollock	ALP	unopp.
Crossbench seats (2)
Marginal
Lockyer	Charles Jamieson	IND	4.5% v CPNP
Safe
Rockhampton	Thomas Dunlop	IND	11.7% v ALP

== Aftermath ==
The CPNP found itself in power as the Great Depression took hold. It lost power after one term.

== See also ==
- Candidates of the Queensland state election, 1929
- Members of the Queensland Legislative Assembly, 1926–1929
- Members of the Queensland Legislative Assembly, 1929–1932
- McCormack Ministry
- Moore Ministry (Queensland)
