= McCormack ministry =

Queensland government ministry from 1925 to 1929

The McCormack Ministry was a ministry of the Government of Queensland and was led by Labor Premier William McCormack. It succeeded the Gillies Ministry on 22 October 1925. The ministry was followed by the Moore Ministry on 21 May 1929 after the government were defeated by the Country and Progressive National Party at the 1929 state election ten days earlier.

On 22 October 1925, the Lieutenant-Governor designated 10 principal executive offices of the Government, and appointed the following Members of the Legislative Assembly of Queensland to the Ministry as follows:

Office	Minister
Premier; Chief Secretary; Treasurer	William McCormack
Deputy Premier; Secretary for Agriculture and Stock	William Forgan Smith
Secretary for Mines	Alfred Jones
Attorney-General	John Mullan
Secretary for Railways	James Larcombe
Home Secretary	James Stopford
Secretary for Public Works	Mick Kirwan
Secretary for Public Instruction	Thomas Wilson
Secretary for Public Lands	Thomas Dunstan
Secretary for Labour and Industry^{[1]}	David Gledson

^{1} Gledson was a minister without portfolio until 6 September 1926. The position of Secretary of Labour and Industry remained unfilled until Gledson's accession to it.

Preceded by Gillies Ministry	McCormack Ministry; 1925–1929	Succeeded by Moore Ministry
