= Electoral results for the district of Paddington =

Electoral results for the district of Paddington may refer to:

- Paddington (UK Parliament constituency)#Elections
- Electoral results for the district of Paddington (New South Wales)
- Electoral results for the district of Paddington (Queensland)
- Electoral results for the district of Paddington-Waverley
