= Electoral results for the district of Paddington (Queensland) =

Election results for Paddington, Queensland, Australia

Paddington, an electoral district of the Legislative Assembly in the Australian state of Queensland, was created in 1912 and abolished in 1932.

Election	Member	Party
1912	John Fihelly	Labor
1915	John Fihelly	Labor
1918	John Fihelly	Labor
1920	John Fihelly	Labor
1922 by	Alfred James Jones	Labor
1923	Alfred James Jones	Labor
1926	Alfred James Jones	Labor
1929	Alfred James Jones	Labor

== Election results ==
=== 1929 ===
1929 Queensland state election: Paddington
Party	Candidate	Votes	%	±%
Labor	Alfred Jones	3,581	71.6	−1.5
Communist	Fred Paterson	1,418	28.4	+28.4
Total formal votes		4,999	90.3	−5.9
Informal votes		539	9.7	+5.9
Turnout		5,538	75.4	−2.0
Labor hold		Swing	N/A	

=== 1926 ===
1926 Queensland state election: Paddington
Party	Candidate	Votes	%	±%
Labor	Alfred Jones	4,130	73.1	+8.8
Independent	Grant Hervey	1,522	26.9	+26.9
Total formal votes		5,652	96.2	−3.3
Informal votes		226	3.8	+3.3
Turnout		5,878	77.4	−5.9
Labor hold		Swing	N/A	

=== 1923 ===
1923 Queensland state election: Paddington
Party	Candidate	Votes	%	±%
Labor	Alfred Jones	3,750	64.3	+2.7
United	George Tedman	2,080	35.7	−2.7
Total formal votes		5,830	99.5	+0.5
Informal votes		28	0.5	−0.5
Turnout		5,858	83.3	+5.9
Labor hold		Swing	+2.7	

=== 1922 by-election ===
1922 Paddington state by-election

=== 1920 ===
1920 Queensland state election: Paddington
Party	Candidate	Votes	%	±%
Labor	John Fihelly	3,717	61.6	+0.7
National Labor	Norm McFadden	2,317	38.4	+38.4
Total formal votes		6,034	99.0	+0.5
Informal votes		58	1.0	−0.5
Turnout		6,092	77.4	−2.3
Labor hold		Swing	N/A	

=== 1918 ===
1918 Queensland state election: Paddington
Party	Candidate	Votes	%	±%
Labor	John Fihelly	3,554	60.9	−7.5
Independent	John Adamson	2,280	39.1	+39.1
Total formal votes		5,834	98.5	+0.6
Informal votes		87	1.5	−0.6
Turnout		5,921	79.7	−7.7
Labor hold		Swing	N/A	

=== 1915 ===
1915 Queensland state election: Paddington
Party	Candidate	Votes	%	±%
Labor	John Fihelly	3,269	68.4	+10.8
Liberal	George Sweetman	1,509	31.6	−10.8
Total formal votes		4,778	97.9	−0.9
Informal votes		102	2.1	+0.9
Turnout		4,880	87.4	+2.8
Labor hold		Swing	+10.8	

=== 1912 ===
1929 Queensland state election: Paddington
Party	Candidate	Votes	%	±%
Labor	Alfred Jones	3,581	71.6	−1.5
Communist	Fred Paterson	1,418	28.4	+28.4
Total formal votes		4,999	90.3	−5.9
Informal votes		539	9.7	+5.9
Turnout		5,538	75.4	−2.0
Labor hold		Swing	N/A	
