= John Goodwin (British Army officer) =

Lieutenant-General Sir John Goodwin KCB KCMG DSO KStJ JP FRCS
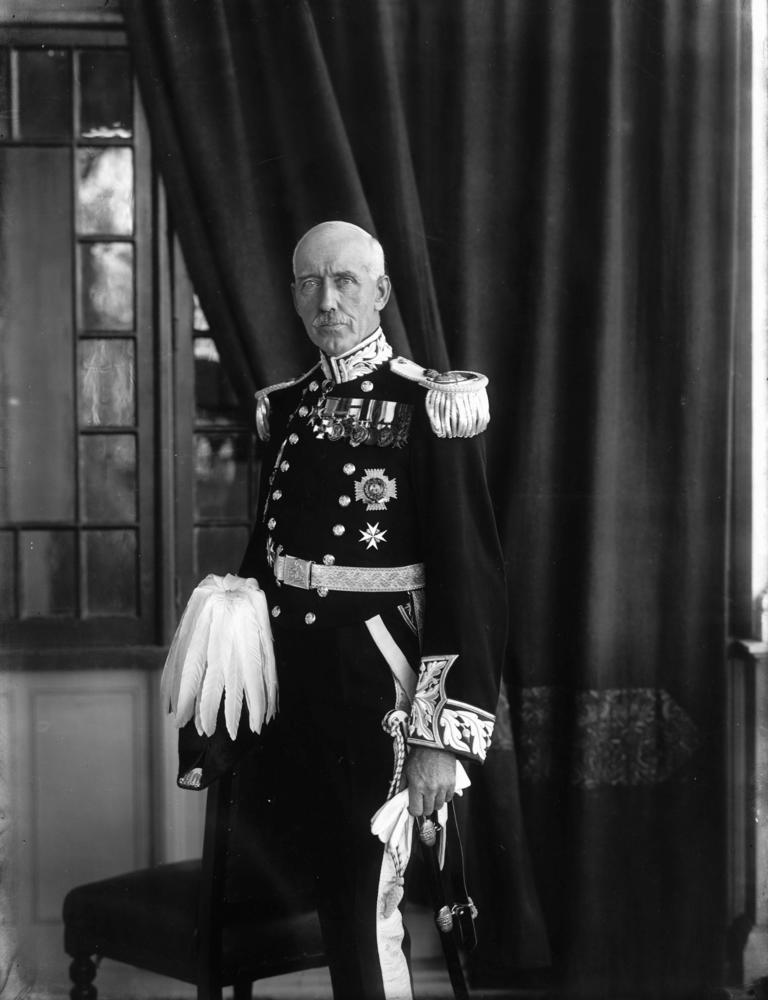

14th Governor of Queensland
- In office 13 July 1927 – 7 April 1932
- Monarch: George V
- Premier: William McCormack; Arthur Edward Moore
- Preceded by: Sir Matthew Nathan
- Succeeded by: Sir Leslie Orme Wilson

Personal details
- Born: 24 May 1871 Kandy, Ceylon
- Died: 29 September 1960 (aged 89) Oxford, Oxfordshire, England
- Spouse: Lilian Isabel Ronaldson
- Profession: Military doctor

Military service
- Allegiance: United Kingdom
- Branch/service: British Army
- Years of service: 1893–1923
- Rank: Lieutenant-General
- Unit: Royal Army Medical Corps
- Commands: Director General Army Medical Services (1918–23)
- Battles/wars: North-West Frontier; First World War
- Awards: Knight Commander of the Order of the Bath; Knight Commander of the Order of St Michael and St George; Distinguished Service Order; Mentioned in dispatches (3); Army Distinguished Service Medal (United States); Croix de guerre (Belgium)

Lieutenant-General Sir Thomas Herbert John Chapman Goodwin, KCB, KCMG, DSO, KStJ, JP, FRCS (24 May 1871 – 29 September 1960) was a British soldier and medical practitioner, who served as the Governor of Queensland from 1927 to 1932.

== Early life and military career ==
Goodwin was born on 24 May 1871 in Kandy, Ceylon (now Sri Lanka) to a British Army surgeon father and an Australian mother. He was educated in England at Newton College, Devon, and undertook medical training at St Mary's Hospital, London where he graduated with a Membership of the Royal College of Surgeons and Royal College of Physicians in 1891.

Commissioned a lieutenant in the British Army Medical Department, Goodwin was stationed in India where he saw active service on the North-West Frontier from 1897 to 1898 and was awarded to the Distinguished Service Order.

== Governor of Queensland ==
Goodwin served as Governor of Queensland from 13 July 1927 to 7 April 1932.

Military offices
| Preceded by Lieutenant General Sir Alfred Keogh | Director General Army Medical Services; 1918–1923 | Succeeded by Lieutenant General Sir William Leishman |
Government offices
| Preceded by Sir Matthew Nathan | Governor of Queensland; 1927–1932 | Succeeded by Sir Leslie Orme Wilson |
