= Deputy Premier of Queensland =

Australian state government role

- Coat of Arms of Queensland

- Flag of Queensland

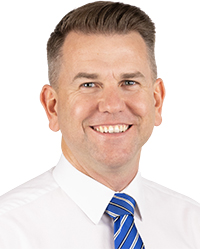
- Incumbent; Jarrod Bleijie since 28 October 2024
- Department of the Premier and Cabinet
- Style: The Honourable
- Member of: Parliament; Cabinet; Executive Council
- Reports to: Premier of Queensland
- Seat: 1 William Street, Brisbane
- Nominator: Premier of Queensland
- Appointer: Governor of Queensland; on the advice of the premier
- Term length: At the governor's pleasure
- Formation: 17 September 1903
- First holder: Andrew Henry Barlow

The deputy premier of Queensland is a role in the Government of Queensland assigned to a responsible Minister in the Australian state of Queensland. It has second ranking behind the premier of Queensland in Cabinet, and its holder serves as acting premier during the absence or incapacity of the premier. The deputy premier may either be appointed by the premier during the cabinet formation process or may be elected by caucus; during periods of Coalition government, the leader of the junior coalition partner is usually automatically selected for the role. Due to the contingent role of the deputy premier, they almost without exception always have additional ministerial portfolios.

Until December 1974, although the role carried the same responsibilities (especially during the absence of the premier) it was never formally recognised or titled as such; the first reference in Hansard to a deputy premier was during the Forgan Smith Ministry in 1936, but the term was in common use in newspapers from as early as 1892, when a minister in the First Griffith Ministry was criticised for his performance in the role.

== List of deputy premiers of Queensland ==
| No. | Portrait | Name Electoral district (Birth–death) | Term of office | | Party | Premier |
| No. | Portrait | Name Electoral district (Birth–death) | Term start | Term end | Party | Premier |
|---|---|---|---|---|---|---|
| 1 | | Andrew Henry Barlow; MLC (1837–1915) | 17 September 1903 | 19 November 1907 | Liberal (until 1907) | Arthur Morgan; Liberal (1903–1906) |
| 1 | | Andrew Henry Barlow; MLC (1837–1915) | 17 September 1903 | 19 November 1907 | Liberal (until 1907) | William Kidston; Labor (until 1907); Kidstonite (from 1907) (1906–1907) |
| 1 | | Andrew Henry Barlow; MLC (1837–1915) | 17 September 1903 | 19 November 1907 | Kidstonite (from 1907) | William Kidston; Labor (until 1907); Kidstonite (from 1907) (1906–1907) |
| 2 | | Digby Denham; MLA for Oxley (1859–1944) | 19 November 1907 | 19 February 1908 | Conservative | Robert Philp; Conservative (1907–1908) |
| (1) | | Andrew Henry Barlow; MLC (1837–1915) | 19 February 1908 | 22 June 1909 | Kidstonite (until 1908) | William Kidston; Kidstonite (until 1908); Liberal (from 1908) (1908–1911) |
| (1) | | Andrew Henry Barlow; MLC (1837–1915) | 19 February 1908 | 22 June 1909 | Liberal (from 1908) | William Kidston; Kidstonite (until 1908); Liberal (from 1908) (1908–1911) |
| (2) | | Digby Denham; MLA for Oxley (1859–1944) | 22 June 1909 | 7 February 1911 | Liberal | William Kidston; Kidstonite (until 1908); Liberal (from 1908) (1908–1911) |
| 3 | | Thomas O'Sullivan; MLC (1856–1953) | 7 February 1911 | 1 June 1915 | Liberal | Digby Denham; Liberal (1911–1915) |
| 4 | | Ted Theodore; MLA for Woothakata (1884–1950) | 1 June 1915 | 22 October 1919 | Labor | T. J. Ryan; Labor (1915–1919) |
| 5 | | John Fihelly; MLA for Paddington (1882–1945) | 22 October 1919 | 8 February 1922 | Labor | Ted Theodore; Labor (1919–1925) |
| 6 | | William Gillies; MLA for Eacham (1868–1928) | 8 February 1922 | 26 February 1925 | Labor | Ted Theodore; Labor (1919–1925) |
| 7 | | William McCormack; MLA for Cairns (1879–1947) | 26 February 1925 | 22 October 1925 | Labor | William Gillies; Labor (1925) |
| 8 | | William Forgan Smith; MLA for Mackay (1887–1953) | 22 October 1925 | 21 May 1929 | Labor | William McCormack; Labor (1925–1929) |
| 9 | | Reginald King; MLA for Logan (1869–1955) | 21 May 1929 | 18 June 1932 | CPNP | Arthur Edward Moore; CPNP (1929–1932) |
| 10 | | Percy Pease; MLA for Herbert (1876–1940) | 18 June 1932 | 17 September 1940 | Labor | William Forgan Smith; Labor (1932–1942) |
| 11 | | Frank Arthur Cooper; MLA for Bremer (1872–1949) | 24 September 1940 | 16 September 1942 | Labor | William Forgan Smith; Labor (1932–1942) |
| 12 | | Ned Hanlon; MLA for Bremer (1887–1952) | 16 September 1942 | 7 March 1946 | Labor | Frank Arthur Cooper; Labor (1942–1946) |
| 13 | | Ted Walsh; MLA for Mirani (1894–1976) | 7 March 1946 | 15 May 1947 | Labor | Ned Hanlon; Labor (1946–1952) |
| 14 | | Vince Gair; MLA for South Brisbane (1901–1980) | 15 May 1947 | 17 January 1952 | Labor | Ned Hanlon; Labor (1946–1952) |
| 15 | | Tom Foley; MLA for Belyando (1886–1973) | 17 January 1952 | 16 March 1953 | Labor | Vince Gair; Labor (until 1957); Queensland Labor (from 1957) (1952–1957) |
| 16 | | Jack Duggan; MLA for Belyando (1910–1993) | 16 March 1953 | 7 June 1957 | Labor | Vince Gair; Labor (until 1957); Queensland Labor (from 1957) (1952–1957) |
| (13) | | Ted Walsh; MLA for Bundaberg (1894–1976) | 7 June 1957 | 12 August 1957 | Queensland Labor | Vince Gair; Labor (until 1957); Queensland Labor (from 1957) (1952–1957) |
| 17 | | Kenneth Morris; MLA for Mount; Coot-tha (1903–1978) | 12 August 1957 | 26 September 1962 | Liberal | Frank Nicklin; Country (1957–1968) |
| 18 | | Alan Munro; MLA for Toowong (1898–1968) | 26 September 1962 | 28 January 1965 | Liberal | Frank Nicklin; Country (1957–1968) |
| 19 | | Thomas Hiley; MLA for Chatsworth (1905–1990) | 28 January 1965 | 23 December 1965 | Liberal | Frank Nicklin; Country (1957–1968) |
| 20 | | Gordon Chalk; MLA for Lockyer (1913–1991) | 23 December 1965 | 1 August 1968 | Liberal | Frank Nicklin; Country (1957–1968) |
| 20 | | Gordon Chalk; MLA for Lockyer (1913–1991) | 23 December 1965 | 1 August 1968 | Liberal | Jack Pizzey; Country (1968) |
| 21 | | Joh Bjelke-Petersen; MLA for Barambah (1911–2005) | 1 August 1968 | 8 August 1968 | Country | Gordon Chalk; Liberal (1968) |
| (20) | | Gordon Chalk; MLA for Lockyer (1913–1991) | 8 August 1968 | 13 August 1976 | Liberal | Joh Bjelke-Petersen; Country (until 1974); National (from 1974) (1968–1987) |
| 22 | | William Knox; MLA for Nundah (1927–2001) | 13 August 1976 | 9 October 1978 | Liberal | Joh Bjelke-Petersen; Country (until 1974); National (from 1974) (1968–1987) |
| 23 | | Llew Edwards; MLA for Ipswich (1935–2021) | 9 October 1978 | 19 August 1983 | Liberal | Joh Bjelke-Petersen; Country (until 1974); National (from 1974) (1968–1987) |
| 24 | | Bill Gunn; MLA for Somerset (1920–2001) | 19 August 1983 | 7 December 1989 | National | Joh Bjelke-Petersen; Country (until 1974); National (from 1974) (1968–1987) |
| 24 | | Bill Gunn; MLA for Somerset (1920–2001) | 19 August 1983 | 7 December 1989 | National | Mike Ahern; National (1987–1989) |
| 24 | | Bill Gunn; MLA for Somerset (1920–2001) | 19 August 1983 | 7 December 1989 | National | Russell Cooper; National (1989) |
| 25 | | Tom Burns; MLA for Lytton (1931–2007) | 7 December 1989 | 19 February 1996 | Labor | Wayne Goss; Labor (1989–1996) |
| 26 | | Joan Sheldon; MLA for Caloundra (born 1943) | 19 February 1996 | 26 June 1998 | Liberal | Rob Borbidge; National (1996–1998) |
| 27 | | Jim Elder; MP for Capalaba (born 1950) | 26 June 1998 | 22 November 2000 | Labor | Peter Beattie; Labor (1998–2007) |
| 28 | | Paul Braddy; MP for Kedron (born 1939) | 22 November 2000 | 30 November 2000 | Labor | Peter Beattie; Labor (1998–2007) |
| 29 | | Terry Mackenroth; MP for Chatsworth (1949–2018) | 30 November 2000 | 28 July 2005 | Labor | Peter Beattie; Labor (1998–2007) |
| 30 | | Anna Bligh; MP for South Brisbane (born 1960) | 28 July 2005 | 13 September 2007 | Labor | Peter Beattie; Labor (1998–2007) |
| 31 | | Paul Lucas; MP for Lytton (born 1962) | 13 September 2007 | 16 September 2011 | Labor | Anna Bligh; Labor (2007–2012) |
| 32 | | Andrew Fraser; MP for Mount Coot-tha (born 1976) | 16 September 2011 | 26 March 2012 | Labor | Anna Bligh; Labor (2007–2012) |
| 33 | | Jeff Seeney; MP for Callide (born 1957) | 26 March 2012 | 14 February 2015 | Liberal National | Campbell Newman; Liberal National (2012–2015) |
| 34 | | Jackie Trad; MP for South Brisbane (born 1972) | 14 February 2015 | 10 May 2020 | Labor | Annastacia Palaszczuk; Labor (2015–2023) |
| 35 | | Steven Miles; MP for Murrumba (born 1977) | 10 May 2020 | 15 December 2023 | Labor | Annastacia Palaszczuk; Labor (2015–2023) |
| 36 | | Cameron Dick; MP for Woodridge (born 1967) | 15 December 2023 | 28 October 2024 | Labor | Steven Miles; Labor (2023–2024) |
| 37 | | Jarrod Bleijie; MP for Kawana (born 1982) | 28 October 2024 | Incumbent | Liberal National | David Crisafulli; Liberal National (since 2024) |

== See also ==
- Government of Queensland
- Politics of Queensland
- Premier of Queensland
