= Arthur Edward Moore =

Australian politician (1876–1963)

The Honourable Arthur Edward Moore CMG
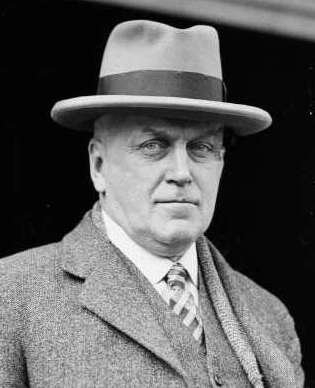

23rd Premier of Queensland
- In office 21 May 1929 – 17 June 1932
- Monarch: George V
- Governor: John Goodwin; Leslie Wilson
- Preceded by: William McCormack
- Succeeded by: William Forgan Smith

Leader of the Opposition in Queensland
- In office 17 June 1932 – 15 July 1936
- Premier: William Forgan Smith
- Preceded by: William Forgan Smith
- Succeeded by: Ted Maher
- In office 19 April 1924 – 11 May 1929
- Premier: Ted Theodore; William Gillies; William McCormack
- Preceded by: Charles Taylor
- Succeeded by: William Forgan Smith

Member of the Queensland Legislative Assembly for Aubigny
- In office 22 May 1915 – 29 March 1941
- Preceded by: Alfred Luke
- Succeeded by: Walter Sparkes

Personal details
- Born: Arthur Edward Moore; 9 February 1876 Napier, New Zealand
- Died: 7 January 1963 (aged 86) Brisbane, Queensland, Australia
- Party: CPNP
- Other political affiliations: Country; Queensland Farmers' Union; National
- Spouse: Mary Eva Warner

Arthur Edward Moore CMG (9 February 1876 – 7 January 1963) was an Australian politician. He was the Country and Progressive National Party Premier of Queensland, from 1929 to 1932. He was the only Queensland Premier not to come from the ranks of the Labor Party between 1915 and 1957. Although successful in achieving the unity of the conservative forces in Queensland for an extended period, Moore's abilities were tested by the onset of the Great Depression and like many other governments in Australia and elsewhere his was unable to endure the formidable challenges it posed.

== Early career ==
Moore was born in Napier, New Zealand in 1876. His family moved to Australia in 1887 when his father became a bank manager in Melbourne. The younger Moore arrived in Queensland in 1898, where he was a dairy farmer on the Darling Downs and the owner of two cheese factories. He followed what was to be the standard National Party road to office for many years – a career in local government, becoming member of Rosalie Shire Council in 1905 and its chairman from 1911 to 1929 and the president of the Queensland Local Authorities Association.

Moore entered the Legislative Assembly of Queensland in 1915 representing the Farmers Union (a forerunner to the Country Party) in the seat of Aubigny. This election saw the defeat of the government of Digby Denham and the election of the Labor government of Thomas J. Ryan. The non-Labor forces in Queensland were in a period of chronic disunity, with the Country Party coming into conflict with what was then known as the Queensland Liberal Party but would later also be called the National and then the United Party. Bitter strife within and between these various parties was a contributing factor to Labor's election victories in 1920, and 1923.

Moore, who had been made Deputy Leader of the Opposition in 1920, was among those Country Party members who, suspicious of United Party motives, refused to join a proposed Country-United merger mooted in the January 1923. The feuding had begun to subside by 1924, when on 9 April Moore was elected Leader of the Opposition, and then in the next year the Country and United parties joined to form the Country Progressive Party, amid criticisms from members of the organisational wings of both former organisations. The Party changed its name in December 1925 to the Country and Progressive National Party (CPNP). The CPNP gained sixteen seats in the elections of 1926 without winning government, and in 1929, amid threats of further division within the CPNP ranks, Moore won a large victory against William McCormack, plagued with his own internal problems, to become Premier.

== The Moore government ==
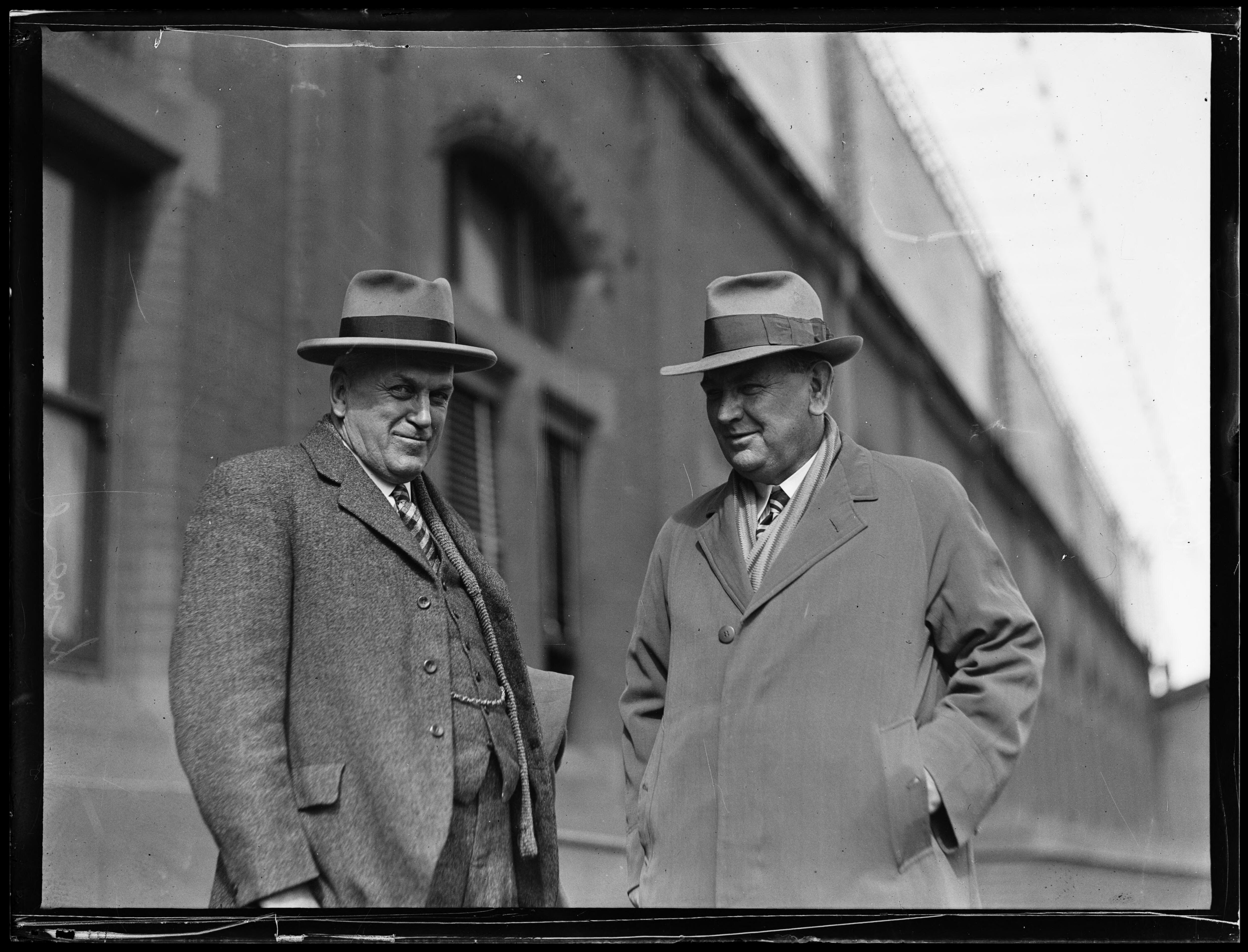
Moore (left) with Senator Hal Colebatch in 1930

Moore's government soon had to deal with the effects of the Great Depression that was wreaking havoc on the economy throughout Australia. Moore responded by following a policy of deflation, limiting government expenditure and attempting to scale back wages and worker's entitlements. In order to assist the state's finances he implemented an income tax, much to the chagrin of many supporters. His proposals for economic assistance to wool growers in 1931 met with opposition from banks and financial institutions. He also came under fire in 1931 when divisions in the CPNP's parliamentary party emerged over the restoration of the Legislative Council, abolished in 1921. Moore came under repeated attack from the conservative Brisbane Courier.

During his term, Moore also redrew the electoral boundaries, becoming one of the many Queensland premiers accused of gerrymandering. The size of the Legislative Assembly was reduced from 72 to 62 seats, mainly accomplished by the abolition of sitting Labor members' seats.

In 1932 Moore instituted a Royal Commission to investigate former Labor Premier E. G. Theodore over his alleged corruption in what was known as the Mungana affair. Moore was accused by many in the Labor movement of orchestrating the Commission's activities in such a way as to deal maximum political damage to the Scullin federal government. The elections of that year confirmed his party's loss of standing with the onset of the Great Depression, as well as continued internal bickering. The CPNP was defeated by Labor under William Forgan Smith.

== After defeat ==
Moore kept the CPNP together as leader until the disastrous defeat of 1935, where it won sixteen out of 62 seats. In the aftermath, the CPNP split, and most of its rural members refounded the Country Party. Holding Moore responsible for the 1935 debacle, Country Party MPs insisted on Moore's resignation as leader. Moore stood down in favour of Ted Maher. He remained on the opposition front bench until his retirement in 1941.

Moore died in 1963. He was accorded a state funeral at Brisbane's St John's Anglican Cathedral and later cremated.

== See also ==
- Moore Ministry (Queensland)

Parliament of Queensland
Preceded by Alfred Luke	Member for Aubigny; 1915–1941	Succeeded by Walter Sparkes
Political offices
Preceded by Charles Taylor	Leader of the Opposition of Queensland; 1924–1929	Succeeded by William Forgan Smith
Preceded by Bill McCormack	Premier of Queensland; 1929–1932	Succeeded by William Forgan Smith
