= Mungana affair =

- Date: 1922–1931
- Location: Queensland, Australia
- Participants: Ted Theodore; William McCormack
- Outcome: Royal Commission report (1930); no criminal charges; unsuccessful civil proceedings

The Mungana affair involved the sale to the Government of Queensland, Australia, in 1922, of some mining properties in the Chillagoe-Mungana districts of northern Queensland, at a grossly inflated price. At that time, Ted Theodore was Premier of Queensland and William McCormack, was member for Cairns and a former Speaker of the Legislative Assembly of Queensland. Both men represented the Australian Labor Party. McCormack was later premier of Queensland, from 1925 to 1929, and Theodore entered federal politics in 1927.

Following the 1929 Queensland state election, the new conservative Queensland Government appointed a Royal Commission to investigate the sale of properties owned by the Mungana Mining Co. On 4 July 1930, the Commission reported. It found that, at the time of the sale in 1922, Theodore and McCormack each secretly held 25% ownership of the properties. It declared that Theodore and McCormack were guilty of "fraud and dishonesty", and abuse of ministerial position. That forced Theodore's immediate resignation from his role as Federal Treasurer. McCormack, who had quit the Labor leadership following his government's 1929 electoral defeat, resigned from Queensland Parliament in February 1930, the month the Royal Commission was set up.

The Queensland Government did not charge either man with any criminal offence. However, it signalled its intention to take civil action to retrieve the difference between the selling price of the mines and their estimated worth. After considerable delay, civil proceedings began on 22 July 1931. A "not guilty" verdict was handed down on 24 August.
