= John Fihelly =

Australian politician & Australia dual-code rugby international player

The Hon John Arthur Fihelly
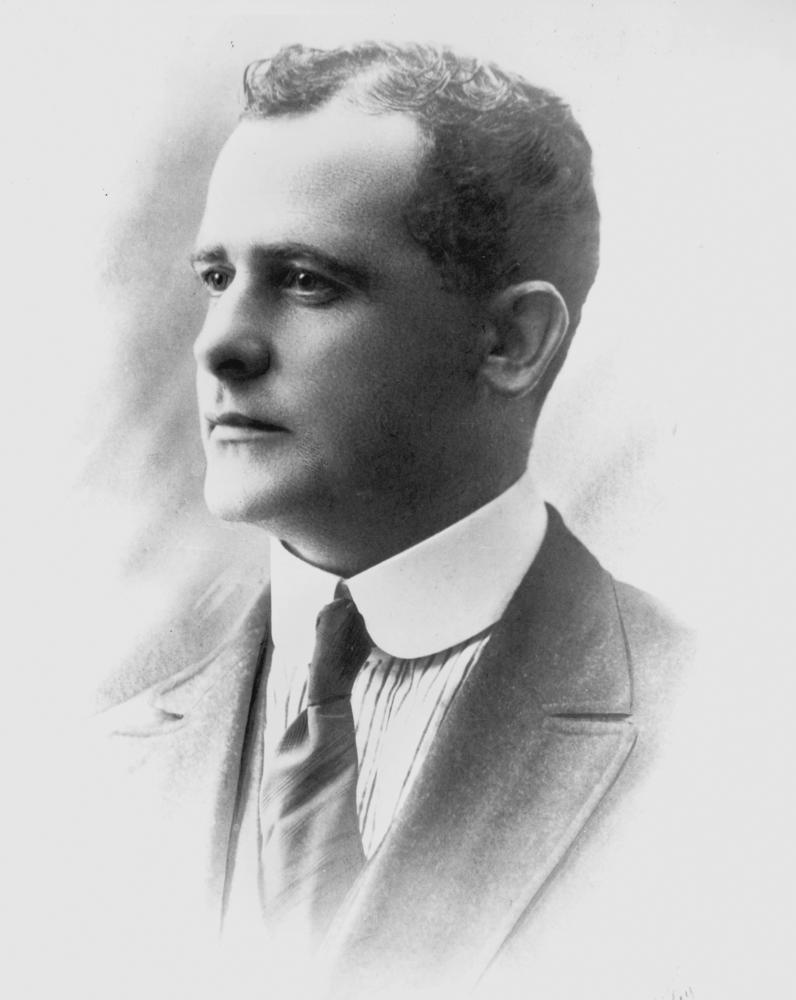

25th Treasurer of Queensland
- In office 9 March 1920 – 8 February 1922
- Preceded by: Ted Theodore
- Succeeded by: Ted Theodore
- Constituency: Paddington

Member of the Queensland Legislative Assembly for Paddington
- In office 27 April 1912 – 7 February 1922
- Preceded by: New seat
- Succeeded by: Alfred Jones

Personal details
- Born: 7 November 1882 Timoleague, County Cork, Ireland
- Died: 2 March 1945 (aged 62) Brisbane, Queensland
- Resting place: Toowong Cemetery
- Party: Labor Party
- Spouse: Marguerite Agnes Murphy
- Relations: Peter Murphy (father-in-law)
- Occupation: Agent-General, Journalist, Public servant, Rugby league Administrator
- Rugby league career

Playing information

Rugby union
- Position: Flanker
Representative
Years	Team	Pld	T	G	FG	P
1907	Australia	1				0

Rugby league
- Position: Second-row, Prop, Lock
Representative
Years	Team	Pld	T	G	FG	P
1908	Queensland	16				0

John Arthur Fihelly (7 November 1882 – 2 March 1945) was a public servant, politician, rugby union and rugby league player in Queensland, Australia. He was the Treasurer of Queensland a founder of Queensland Rugby League, and represented Australia as a rugby league footballer.

== Early life ==
Fihelly was born in Timoleague, County Cork, Ireland in 1882, and emigrated to Australia with his family the following year. He was educated at the Petrie Terrace State School and St Joseph's College, Gregory Terrace, Brisbane until 1895. He then joined the post office as a telegraph messenger and later transferred to the Department of Trade and Customs.

== Rugby ==
Fihelly was a rugby union flanker,representing Queensland between 1905 and 1907, and claimed one international cap for Australia in 1907. He then became one of rugby league football's founding players in Brisbane, being selected for Queensland during the 1907–08 New Zealand rugby tour of Australia and Great Britain against the visiting "All Golds" in what were the first games of rugby league football ever played in Queensland. In 1908 he traveled to Britain on the first rugby league Kangaroo tour as assistant manager.

== Politics ==
Fihelly got his start in 1908 when he joined the Department of Trade and Customs as a junior clerk in its State office. In 1918 Fihelly was made secretary of railways.

He was elected as the Labor member for Paddington in the Legislative Assembly of Queensland in 1912 and held several ministerial roles including Attorney-General and Treasurer until his resignation in 1922.

== Later life ==
Fihelly died of a cerebral thrombosis on 2 March 1945. He deteriorated for years after fracturing his skull in September 1926 in an accident at Sandgate. Before dying, Fihelly spent time in the Dunwich Benevolent Institution.

Upon his death in 1945, Fihelly was rewarded with a State funeral at St Stephen's Cathedral and was buried in Toowong Cemetery.

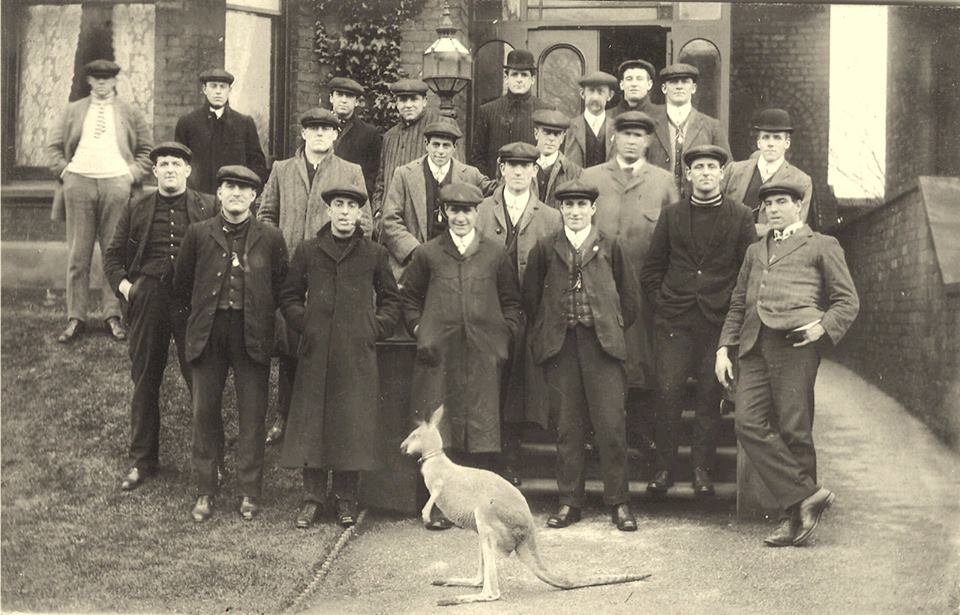
Fihelly back row, bowler hat with a group of the 1908 Kangaroos

Political offices
Preceded by Ted Theodore	Treasurer of Queensland; 1920–1922	Succeeded by Ted Theodore
Parliament of Queensland
New seat	Member for Paddington; 1912–1922	Succeeded by Alfred Jones
