= Ted Theodore =

Australian politician (1884–1950)

The Honourable Ted Theodore
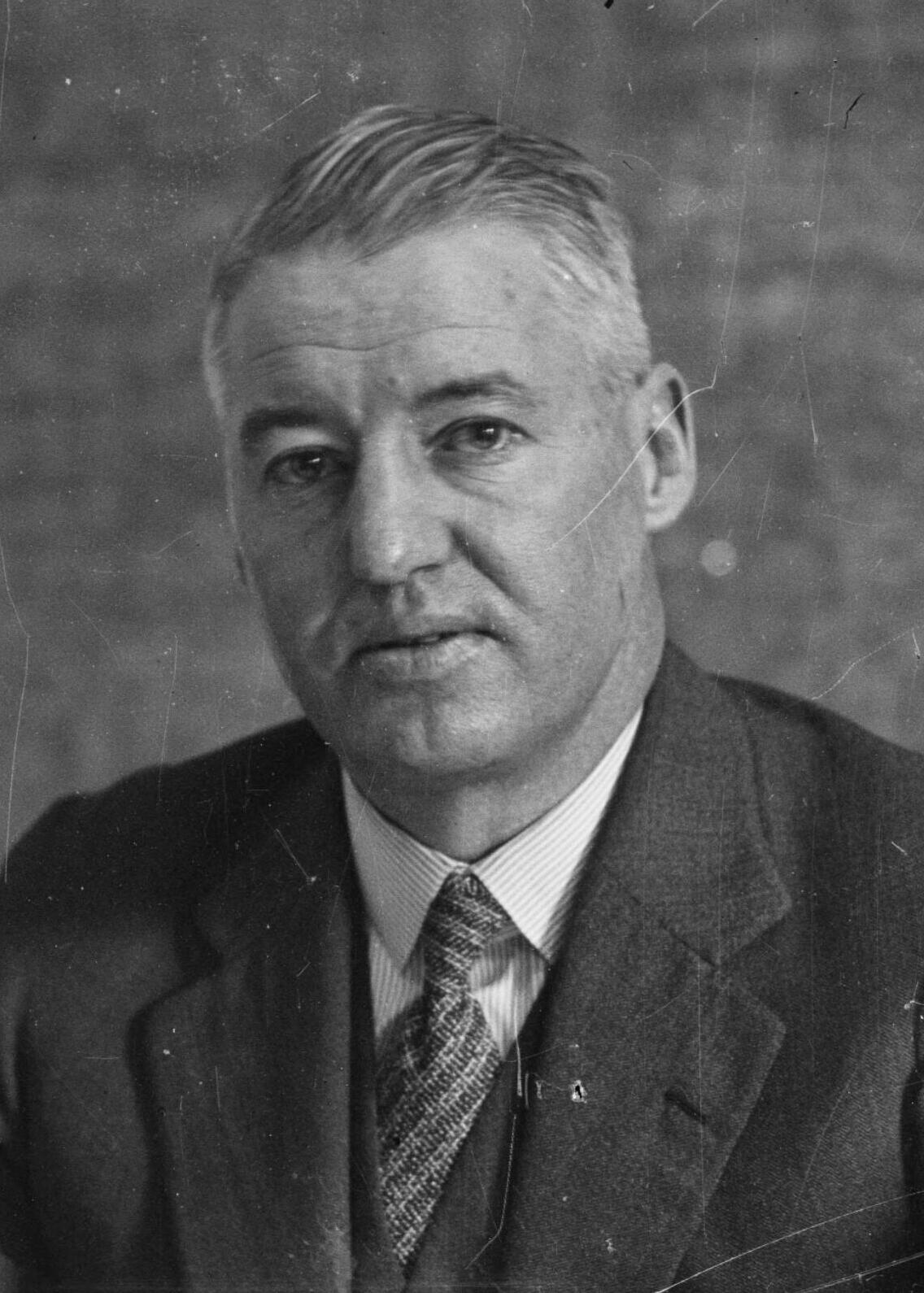

Treasurer of Australia
- In office 29 January 1931 – 6 January 1932
- Prime Minister: James Scullin
- Preceded by: James Scullin
- Succeeded by: Joseph Lyons
- In office 22 October 1929 – 9 June 1930
- Prime Minister: James Scullin
- Preceded by: Earle Page
- Succeeded by: James Scullin

Deputy Leader of the Labor Party
- In office 5 February 1929 – 19 December 1931
- Leader: James Scullin
- Preceded by: Arthur Blakeley
- Succeeded by: Frank Forde

Member of Parliament for Dalley
- In office 26 February 1927 – 19 December 1931
- Preceded by: William Mahony
- Succeeded by: Sol Rosevear

20th Premier of Queensland
- In office 22 October 1919 – 26 February 1925
- Monarch: George V
- Deputy: John Fihelly; William Gillies
- Governor: Hamilton Goold-Adams; Matthew Nathan
- Preceded by: T. J. Ryan
- Succeeded by: William Gillies

4th Deputy Premier of Queensland
- In office 1 June 1915 – 22 October 1919
- Premier: T. J. Ryan
- Preceded by: Thomas O'Sullivan
- Succeeded by: John Fihelly
State cabinet posts
Chief Secretary
In office 22 October 1919 – 26 February 1925
Preceded by	T. J. Ryan
Succeeded by	William Gillies
24th Treasurer of Queensland
In office 8 February 1922 – 26 February 1925
Preceded by	John Fihelly
Succeeded by	William Gillies
In office 22 October 1919 – 9 March 1920
Preceded by	Himself
Succeeded by	John Fihelly
In office 1 June 1915 – 22 October 1919
Premier	T. J. Ryan
Preceded by	Walter Barnes
Succeeded by	Himself
Secretary for Public Works
In office 8 February 1922 – 6 October 1922
Preceded by	John Fihelly
Succeeded by	William Forgan Smith
In office 1 June 1915 – 22 October 1919
Premier	T. J. Ryan
Preceded by	T. J. Ryan
Succeeded by	Walter Barnes
State party positions
Leader of the Labor Party in Queensland
In office 22 October 1919 – 24 February 1925
Deputy	John Fihelly; William Gillies
Preceded by	T. J. Ryan
Succeeded by	William Gillies
Deputy Leader of the Labor Party in Queensland
In office 7 September 1912 – 22 October 1919
Preceded by	T. J. Ryan
Succeeded by	John Fihelly
State electorates
Member of the Legislative Assembly for Woothakata
In office 27 April 1912 – 22 September 1925
Preceded by	New seat
Succeeded by	John O'Keefe
Member of the Legislative Assembly for Chillagoe
In office 2 October 1909 – 27 April 1912
Preceded by	Michael Woods
Succeeded by	Seat abolished

Personal details
- Born: Edward Granville Theodore (Note: Anglicised-modification of his fathers surname: Teodorescu.); 29 December 1884 Port Adelaide, Province of South Australia
- Died: 9 February 1950 (aged 65) Edgecliff, New South Wales, Australia
- Resting place: South Head Cemetery, Bronte
- Party: Labor
- Spouse: Esther Mahoney (m. 1909)
- Relations: Stephen (brother)
- Children: 4

Edward Granville Theodore (29 December 1884 – 9 February 1950) was an Australian politician who served as Premier of Queensland from 1919 to 1925, as leader of the state Labor Party. He later entered federal politics, serving as Treasurer in the Scullin Labor government.

Theodore was born in Adelaide, the son of a Romanian immigrant. He left school at the age of 12, and spent the next decade working his way around the country. He arrived in Queensland in 1906, and soon became involved in the labour movement. Theodore was elected to the Queensland Legislative Assembly in 1909, aged just 24. He was also elected state president of the Australian Workers' Union in 1913. Theodore became Treasurer of Queensland following Labor's victory at the 1915 state election.

In 1919, Theodore succeeded T. J. Ryan as premier. His government pursued various interventionist economic policies, including the launching of a popular rural development strategy, the establishment of a number of state-run enterprises, and the introduction of new competition and labour market regulations. These perceived steps towards socialism led to Theodore being nicknamed "Red Ted". A notable constitutional reform was the abolition of the Queensland Legislative Council in 1922; Queensland remains the only Australian state with no upper house in its parliament. Theodore was popular among the general public, and won two state elections (1920 and 1923) before resigning in 1925 to enter federal politics. He was defeated at his first attempt, but two years later won a by-election for the Sydney seat of Dalley.

In 1929, Theodore was elected deputy leader to James Scullin. He became Treasurer and de facto Deputy Prime Minister after the 1929 election, but resigned after less than a year amid accusations of corruption. Theodore returned as a Treasurer in early 1931, and served until the government's landslide defeat at the 1931 election, where he lost his own seat. He had little success in combating the Great Depression, and disputes over economic policy led to a party split and several defections to Lang Labor and the United Australia Party. Theodore was only 47 when he left politics, and went on to have a successful business career as a partner of Frank Packer.

== Early life ==
Theodore was born on 29 December 1884 in Port Adelaide, Province of South Australia, the second of six children born to Annie (née Tanner) and Basil Stephen Theodore (Romanian: Vasile Ștefan Teodorescu). His parents had met in 1882, on the passage from England to Australia. After arriving in Fremantle, Western Australia, they initially went their separate ways; they kept in touch by letter, however, and by the end of the year had married in Perth. They subsequently moved to Adelaide, where their first son Stephen was born the following year.

Theodore's father, originally named Vasile Teodorescu, was born in Galați, Moldavia, into a well-to-do family connected with the Romanian nobility. He and his brother travelled to London in their youth, where they learned English. His parents had intended that he follow his father into the Romanian Orthodox priesthood, but he quit divinity school to join the British Merchant Navy. Theodore's mother was born in Manchester, England, and descended from Irish immigrants. Her father died when she was an infant, and she was sent to work in the Lancashire cotton mills. When her mother died, she accepted an invitation to join her step-brother Tom Harrison (an ex-convict) at his farm in Greenough, Western Australia; however, she stayed there only a few months before returning to Perth to marry.

Theodore was educated at Lefevre Peninsula Catholic and Aldgate State schools in Adelaide, but left school at 12 to work on the Adelaide docks. In 1900, aged 16, he left for the goldfields of Western Australia, working as a labourer at Lennonville and Peak Hill. He then joined a guano mining crew on the Houtman Abrolhos, where he acquired his lifelong love of fishing. After a while, Theodore returned to the mainland and worked as a gold miner at Day Dawn and Kalgoorlie. He went back to Adelaide for Christmas 1902, and then joined his father on an unsuccessful prospecting expedition to Leigh Creek and Bundaleer, where they had hoped to find copper. Later in 1903, Theodore got his first experience in industrial relations, helping negotiate a wage increase for miners at Arltunga. He then decided to try his luck at Broken Hill, New South Wales. In 1906 he left for Cairns, Queensland where he prospected for tin in the Chillagoe area and worked in the Vulcan Mine in Irvinebank. It was among the unorganised workers of Stannary Hills and Irvinebank that the Amalgamated Workers' Association of North Queensland was born.

== State politics ==
Theodore founded the Amalgamated Workers' Association with Bill McCormack. This union used the process and principle of amalgamation to unify with other unions until it became Australia's largest union, the Australian Workers' Union (AWU). Theodore became Queensland state president of the AWU in 1913. Meanwhile, he had been elected to the Legislative Assembly of Queensland in Woothakata from 1909 to 1912 for the Australian Labor Party and subsequently from 1912 to 1925 in Chillagoe (the seat of Woothakata renamed). His position in the AWU made him a power in the Parliamentary Labor Party, and when Labor won a majority in the Assembly for the first time in 1915, he became Treasurer and Secretary for Public Works in the government of T. J. Ryan.

=== Premier of Queensland ===
In 1919, Ryan resigned and Theodore succeeded him as Premier of Queensland, then Australia's only Labor state government, following the great split in the Labor Party over the issue of conscription in World War I. He was a popular and successful Premier, and soon began to be talked about as a possible federal Labor leader. Educational measures were implemented that were of benefit to the handicapped and isolated, while adult franchise in local government was introduced and the upper house of Parliament was abolished. Workers benefited from the introduction of a compulsory unemployment scheme, changes in the Safety and Accommodation Acts, and the Profiteering Prevention Act. Improvements in housing were also secured through amendments to the Savings Bank Act, the Workers' Homes Act, and the Fair Rents Act. Agriculture also received much attention through measures like the Agricultural Education Act, the Irrigation Act, the Main Roads Act, and the establishment of an Agricultural Bank, a cold store, a state cannery, a Cheese Pool, and a wheat board. Orderly marketing and controls on price fluctuations were also carried out to develop agriculture, while the Theodore Government also involved itself in the marketing of Queensland fruit produce.

In 1925, Theodore resigned as Premier and stood for the Queensland seat of Herbert in the federal election, but was unexpectedly defeated by Lewis Nott by 268 votes.

== Federal politics ==
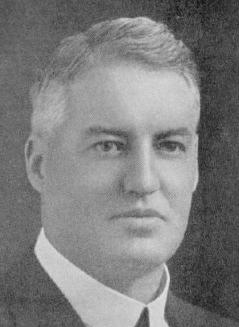
Theodore as a federal MP in the 1920s

Theodore was elected to the House of Representatives for the seat of Dalley in Sydney at a 1927 by-election. His status as an outsider in Sydney Labor politics was a permanent problem for him, but he soon made his mark in federal Parliament. In 1929 he became Deputy Leader of the Labor Party and Deputy Opposition Leader under James Scullin. In October 1929 Scullin defeated the conservative government of Stanley Bruce and became Prime Minister, while Theodore became Treasurer and de facto Deputy Prime Minister.

Two days after the Scullin government was sworn in, the US stock market crashed. The effects of the Great Depression were soon felt in Australia, and the Scullin government, like others, was hard pressed to deal with mounting unemployment and the collapse of world trade, on which Australia's export-based economy depended. Theodore, an early advocate of Keynesian economics, favoured deficit spending to rejuvenate the economy. However, Works and Railways Minister Joseph Lyons and Trade Minister James Fenton supported a more traditional, deflationary approach.

Meanwhile, a conservative government had taken power in Queensland, and appointed a Royal Commission to investigate Theodore's financial dealings as Premier. The Commission found that Theodore and another former Queensland Premier William McCormack, had corruptly profited by authorising the purchase by the state of a copper mine at Mungana while concealing the fact that they had a financial interest in the mine, which furthermore was not economically viable. In July 1930 the "Mungana affair" forced Theodore's resignation.

Without Theodore's leadership and financial skills, the Scullin government drifted into deeper crisis. When it became apparent that the Queensland government did not intend charging Theodore with any offence, Scullin re-appointed him as Treasurer, in January 1931. Lyons and Fenton felt that Scullin should have waited until Theodore had been formally cleared, and resigned from cabinet in protest. Two months later, they and three of their supporters crossed the floor to the non-Labor opposition, and eventually joined forces with the Nationalists to form the United Australia Party, led by Lyons.

=== The Depression ===
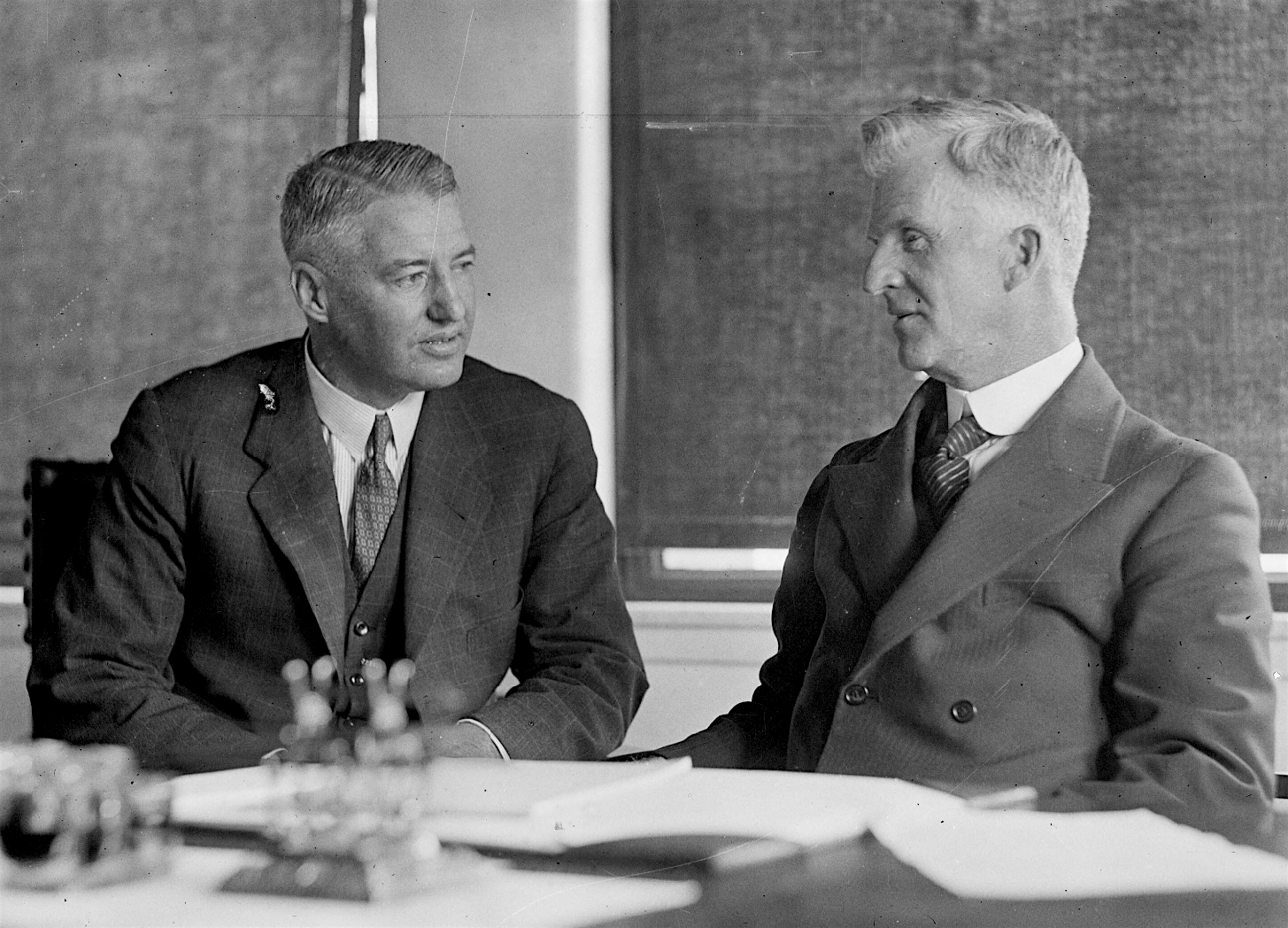
Theodore with Prime Minister James Scullin in December 1929

During 1931 Theodore faced the greatest economic crisis in Australian history. The government imported an advisor from the Bank of England, Dr Otto Niemeyer, who recommended an "orthodox" solution, including sharp reductions in government spending such as pensions and unemployment benefits. The radical Premier of New South Wales, Jack Lang, on the other hand, campaigned for the repudiation of Australia's debt to bond-holders in London.

Theodore rejected both these alternatives and proposed instead an expansion of credit to farmers and small business, through the issue of "fiduciary notes" which could be redeemed after the Depression. His Fiduciary Notes Bill was denounced as financially unsound by orthodox economists and the banks. It was eventually defeated in the Senate, which was still controlled by the conservative opposition. Theodore has been described as a visionary proto-Keynesian for this proposal, although it cannot be known what effect his measures would have had on the Depression had the bill been passed.

In March 1931, Lang's supporters in Parliament deserted the main body of Labor. Combined with the defection of Lyons and his supporters a few weeks earlier, this cost Scullin his majority. In November, the UAP and Langites rose to defeat the government on a non-confidence motion, and an election was held in December. Theodore had no base of support in Sydney and he lost his seat to Lang candidate Sol Rosevear. This ended Theodore's political career, although during the 1930s several offers were made to him to return.

He was the only sitting treasurer to lose his seat until Josh Frydenberg in 2022.

== Later life ==
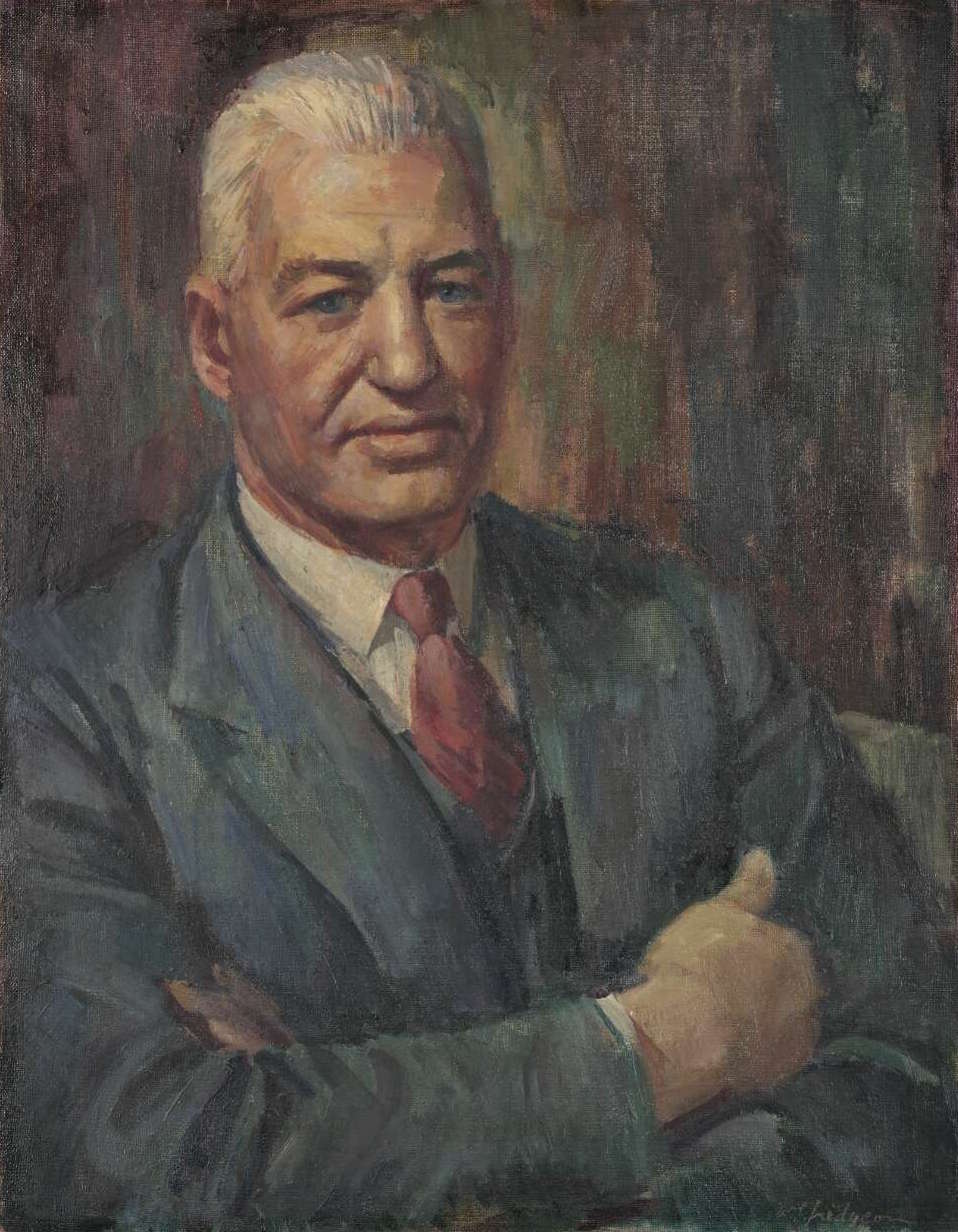
Theodore (1945), by William Pidgeon

=== Newspaper industry ===
Theodore left politics entirely after his defeat. In 1932, Theodore began a business relationship with 25-year-old Frank Packer, the son of newspaper industry veteran R. C. Packer. The duo formed Sydney Newspapers Limited with the aim of acquiring The World, a daily newspaper published by the Australian Workers' Union that was known to be in financial difficulties. For £100, they acquired the rights to lease the masthead and plant for one year. It was subsequently announced that the newspaper would be re-branded as The Star and would be priced at 1d (one penny), compared with 1½d for its major rival The Sun, published by Associated Newspapers Limited. Hugh Denison, the managing director of Associated Newspapers, paid Theodore and Packer £86,500 in return for an agreement for them not to publish a daily or Sunday newspaper for three years.

Theodore invested most of his profits back into Associated Newspapers, buying shares at a low price and selling them later for a 500–600% return. He and Frank Packer subsequently decided to create a new weekly magazine for women, which they titled The Australian Women's Weekly. George Warnecke, an ALP acquaintance of Theodore's, was appointed as the founding editor. The new publication proved immensely successful, and in 1936 Theodore and Packer joined forces with Denison to form Australian Consolidated Press (ACP), which became the new publisher of the Women's Weekly and Denison's The Daily Telegraph. Theodore served as chairman of the new company, but "interested himself only in the financial and administrative aspects" while Packer concentrated on publishing.

=== Fiji ===
In 1933, Theodore learned that gold had been found in Fiji on the island of Viti Levu. The area of interest had been pegged by Bill Borthwick and leased by Pat Costello, both of whom had connections with Queensland. Theodore contacted Costello, an old acquaintance, about the find, and offered to finance further exploration of the area. He formed a syndicate with Frank Packer, John Wren, and Wren's associate Patrick Cody, with each of them holding a quarter stake. Geological findings were initially unfavourable. Eventually three mines were established – Emperor, Loloma and Dolphin – with Theodore as managing director of all three. Their success sparked a minor gold rush, but by the end of 1936 the three mines were the only ones remaining. By 1943 Loloma alone had yielded $10 million worth of gold and paid over $2 million in dividends.

Theodore took a keen interest in the welfare of the miners. He advised the government on the creation of medical benefits and workers' compensation schemes, while the company town had three schools, a golf course, a bowling green, tennis courts, a dispensary and a maternity hospital. Due to his success in Fiji, Theodore was approached by the British administrations in Borneo and the Solomon Islands to lead prospecting expeditions. Neither were successful, and he contracted malaria while in Borneo; upon his return, he was presented with a tabua (polished whale's tooth) and elevated to the chiefly rank of ratu. Theodore took up full-time residence in Fiji, returning to Australia only for business trips and trout-fishing. He had a residence 10 miles (16 km) outside of Suva, and while at the mines lived in a bure.

=== World War II ===
In March 1939, Prime Minister Joseph Lyons cabled Theodore in Fiji, asking him to return to Australia and co-ordinate the country's national resources for defence purposes. However, due to Lyons' defection from Labor being a key contributor to Theodore's political demise, Theodore therefore declined, stating that "in the absence of some emergency involving the national safety, I would like to keep out of politics". In the event however Lyons' offer became moot when he died the following month April before anything could be arranged. In May 1940, the Loan Council offered him the position of coordinator of works. This proved highly controversial among members of the government, and Prime Minister Robert Menzies issued a statement explaining that the offer had been made entirely by the Loan Council and would have to be ratified by cabinet. Theodore eventually agreed in February 1942 to oversee the creation of the Allied Works Council, with himself as Director-General of Allied Works. He subsequently established the Civil Constructional Corps (CCC) to undertake construction work requested by the military.

Theodore faced criticism and political interference from his former opponents in the ALP, particularly Jack Lang and Eddie Ward, the Minister for Labour and National Service. He requested that the Department of Labour and National Service provide the CCC with lists of men available for work, but Ward refused to allow the information to be issued. The corps had to resort to telephone directories and electoral rolls in order to recruit sufficient workers. Ward then attacked Theodore for calling up elderly and deceased men. In September 1942, Theodore tendered his resignation to Curtin, citing Ward's lack of cooperation. Curtin relaxed political controls and gave him additional powers, including the ability to prosecute men who refused to work. He rescinded his resignation and eventually left the position in October 1944.

=== Final years ===
Theodore was a delegate to the Imperial Press Conference in London in 1946. He resumed his work in Fiji and considered moving there permanently. However, the following year he was diagnosed with a serious heart condition. His health declined rapidly and he began handing business responsibilities to his children; he resigned from ACP in January 1949.

After several days in a coma, Theodore died at his flat in Edgecliff on 9 February 1950, at the age of 65. His funeral was held at St Mary's Cathedral, Sydney, with the mass celebrated by his friend James Duhig, Catholic Archbishop of Brisbane. He was buried at South Head Cemetery.

== Personal life ==
Theodore married Esther Mahoney on 20 December 1909. She worked as a photographic tinter and was the daughter of a cabinetmaker from Toowoomba. The couple had two sons and two daughters. She was eleven years his senior. The couple were estranged at the time of Theodore's death in 1950. After Ted's death his son John assumed charge of the family's joint business interests with Frank Packer and he became the first managing director of Channel 9.

== Assessment ==
The Mungana affair likely cost Theodore a chance to become prime minister, and would "irreparably taint his reputation during his lifetime and beyond". Historian Ross Fitzgerald has called him "the most talented Labor politician never to be prime minister of Australia", and noted that his admirers include Paul Keating, Bob Katter, and Jack Lang (his former opponent).

== Named in his honour ==
The following things were named after Theodore:

- Theodore, a town in the Shire of Banana
- Electoral district of Theodore, an electorate in the Queensland Legislative Assembly created in the 2017 Queensland state electoral redistribution
- Theodore, suburb of Canberra

== Notes ==
Political offices
Preceded by T. J. Ryan	Premier of Queensland; 1919–1925	Succeeded by William Gillies
Preceded by Dr Earle Page	Treasurer of Australia; 1929–1930	Succeeded by James Scullin
Preceded by James Scullin	Treasurer of Australia; 1931–1932	Succeeded by Joseph Lyons
Parliament of Queensland
Preceded by Michael Woods	Member for Woothakata; 1909–1912	Succeeded by Abolished
Preceded by New Division	Member for Chillagoe; 1912–1925	Succeeded by John O'Keefe
Parliament of Australia
Preceded by William Mahony	Member for Dalley; 1927–1931	Succeeded by Sol Rosevear
Party political offices
Preceded by T. J. Ryan	Leader of the Labor Party in Queensland; 1919–1925	Succeeded by William Gillies
Preceded by Arthur Blakeley	Deputy Leader of the Australian Labor Party; 1929–1931	Succeeded by Frank Forde
