= William Gillies (Australian politician) =

Australian politician (1868–1928)

The Honourable William Gillies
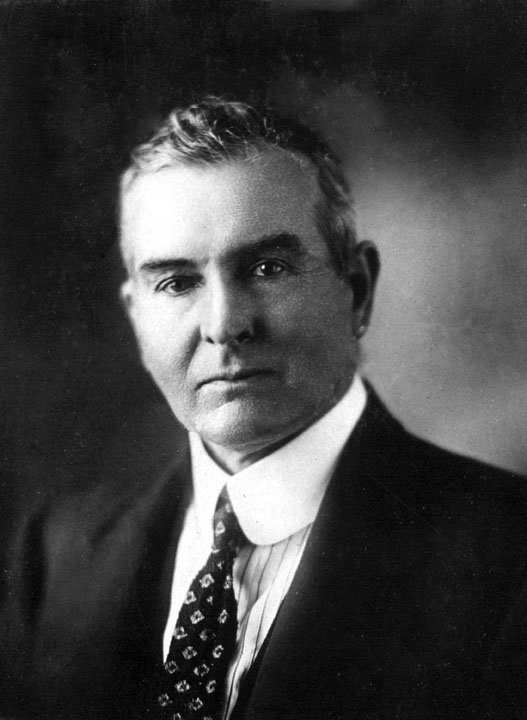
- Gillies in 1920

21st Premier of Queensland
- In office 26 February 1925 – 22 October 1925
- Governor: Matthew Nathan
- Deputy: William McCormack
- Preceded by: Ted Theodore
- Succeeded by: William McCormack
- Constituency: Eacham

26th Treasurer of Queensland
- In office 26 February 1925 – 22 October 1925
- Preceded by: Ted Theodore
- Succeeded by: William McCormack
- Constituency: Eacham

Member of the Queensland Legislative Assembly for Eacham
- In office 27 April 1912 – 24 October 1925
- Preceded by: New seat
- Succeeded by: Cornelius Ryan

Personal details
- Born: 27 October 1868 Eccleston, New South Wales
- Died: 9 February 1928 (aged 59) Toowong, Brisbane, Queensland, Australia
- Resting place: Toowong Cemetery
- Party: Labor
- Spouse: Margaret Smith (m. 1900)
- Relations: Robert Gillies (brother)
- Profession: Farmer

William Neal Gillies (27 October 1868 – 9 February 1928) was an Australian Labor politician in Queensland who served as premier of Queensland from February to October 1925.

== Early life ==
Gillies was born in Eccleston, New South Wales (in the Allyn River district), the son of Dougald Gillies, farmer, and his wife Mary (née Gillies), both parents being Scottish immigrants.

In 1900, Gillies married Margaret Smith.

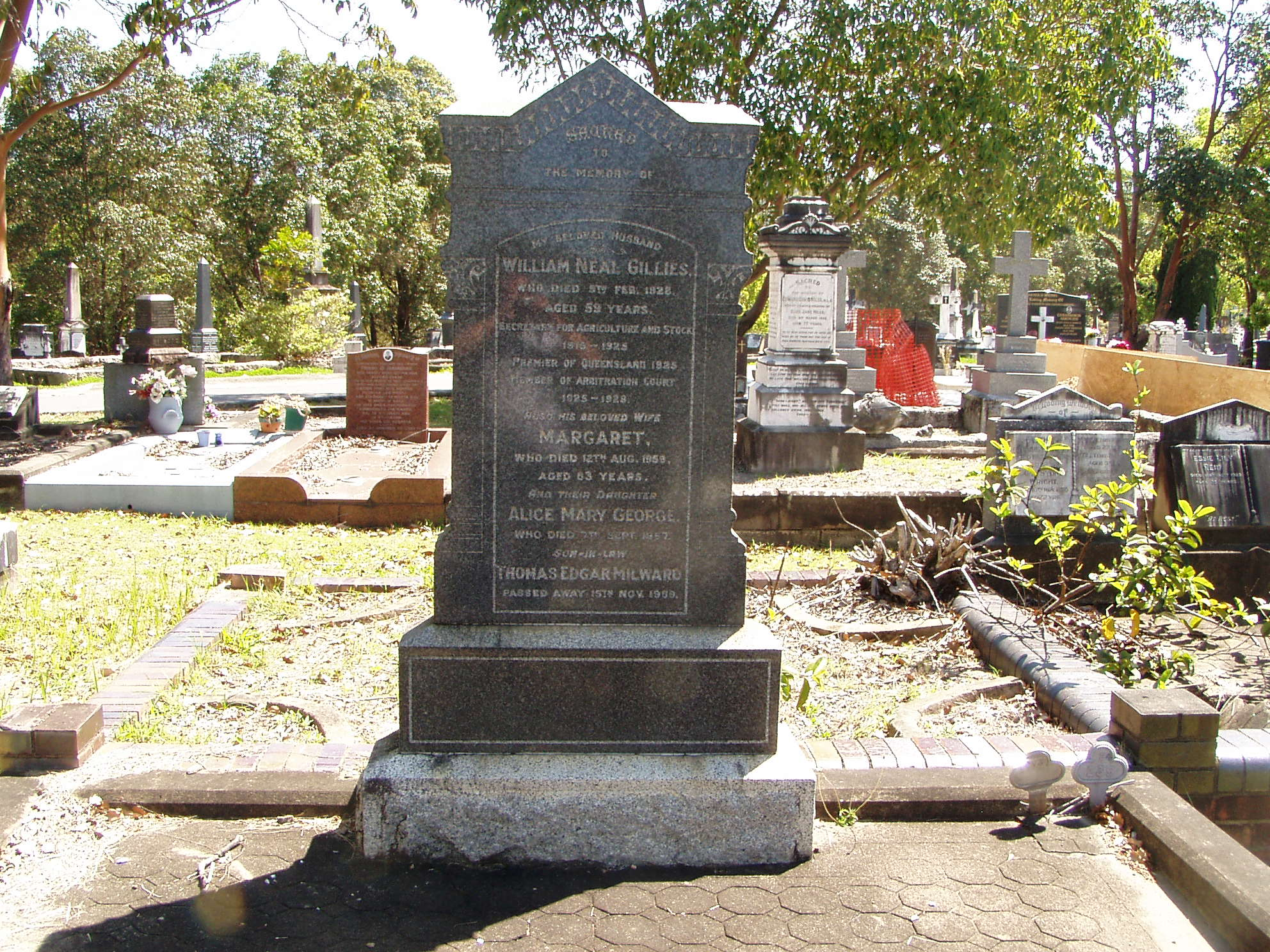
William Gillies's headstone at Brisbane's Toowong Cemetery

== Legacy ==
Gillies was accorded a state funeral which took place from St Andrew's Presbyterian Church to his burial place at Toowong Cemetery.

The Gillies Highway in Far North Queensland was named after him, as he founded the Main Roads Board, which subsequently became the Department of Main Roads (now part of the Department of Transport and Main Roads).

Political offices
Preceded by Ted Theodore	Premier of Queensland; 1925	Succeeded by William McCormack
Party political offices
Preceded by Ted Theodore	Leader of the Labor Party in Queensland; 1925	Succeeded by William McCormack
Parliament of Queensland
Preceded by New seat	Member for Eacham; 1912–1925	Succeeded by Cornelius Ryan
