= Matthew Nathan =

British colonial administrator (1862–1939)

Lieutenant-Colonel The Right Honourable Sir Matthew Nathan GCMG PC (Ire)
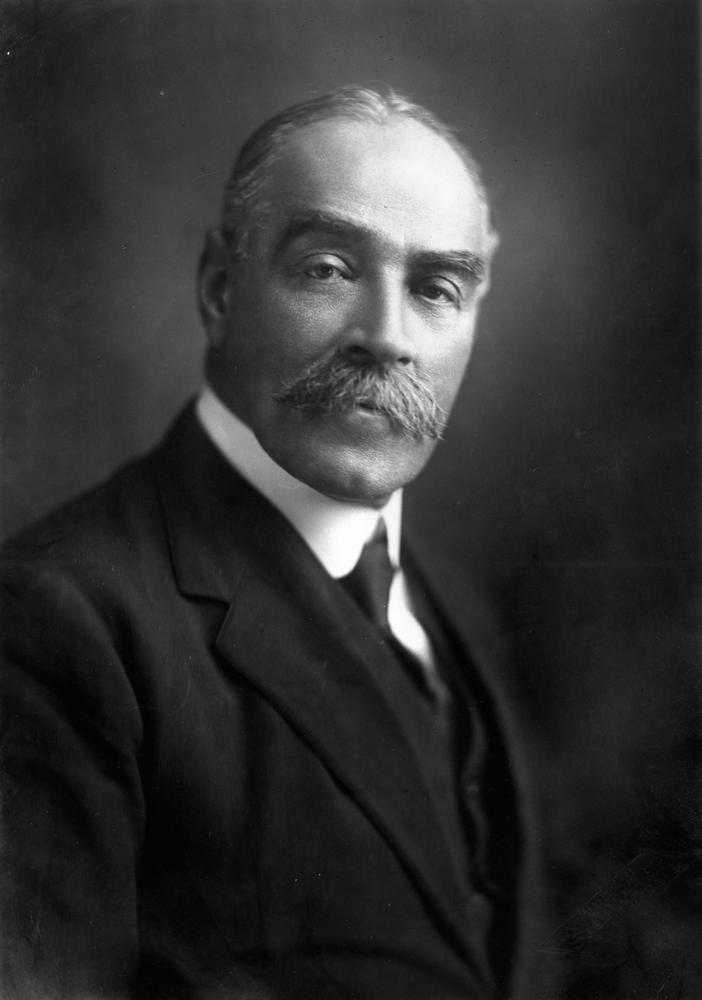

20th Governor of the Gold Coast
- In office 17 December 1900 – 9 February 1904
- Monarchs: Victoria; Edward VII
- Preceded by: Frederick Mitchell Hodgson
- Succeeded by: John Pickersgill Rodger

13th Governor of Hong Kong
- In office 29 July 1904 – 29 July 1907
- Monarch: Edward VII
- Colonial Secretary: Sir Francis Henry May
- Preceded by: Sir Henry Arthur Blake
- Succeeded by: Sir Frederick Lugard

7th Governor of Natal
- In office 2 September 1907 – 23 December 1909
- Monarch: Edward VII
- Preceded by: Sir Henry Edward McCallum
- Succeeded by: Paul Methuen, 3rd Baron Methuen

Under-Secretary for Ireland
- In office 12 October 1914 – 3 May 1916
- Monarch: George V
- Preceded by: James Dougherty
- Succeeded by: Robert Chalmers

13th Governor of Queensland
- In office 3 December 1920 – 17 September 1925
- Preceded by: Sir Hamilton Goold-Adams
- Succeeded by: Sir John Goodwin

Personal details
- Born: 3 January 1862 Paddington, London, England
- Died: 18 April 1939 (aged 77) West Coker, Somerset, England
- Resting place: Willesden Jewish Cemetery, England
- Education: Royal Military Academy, Woolwich
- Profession: Soldier, colonial administrator

Chinese name
- Traditional Chinese: 彌敦
- Simplified Chinese: 弥敦
Transcriptions
Yue: Cantonese
- Jyutping: nei4 deon1

Lieutenant-Colonel Sir Matthew Nathan GCMG PC (Ire) (3 January 1862 – 18 April 1939) was a British soldier and colonial administrator, who variously served as the governor of Sierra Leone, Gold Coast, Hong Kong, Natal and Queensland. He was Under-Secretary for Ireland from 1914 to 1916, and was responsible, with the Chief Secretary, Augustine Birrell, for the administration of Ireland in the years immediately preceding the Easter Rising.

== Early life and career ==
Nathan was born in Paddington, London, England. He was of Jewish descent and the second son of businessman Jonah Nathan and Miriam Jacob Nathan. His brothers were Colonel Sir Frederick Nathan, an officer of the Royal Artillery and sometime Superintendent of Waltham Abbey Royal Gunpowder Mills, and Sir Nathaniel Nathan, a colonial judge in Trinidad and Tobago.

Nathan was educated at Royal Military Academy, Woolwich, where he was the winner of the Pollock Medal (1880) before being gazetted to Royal Engineers in 1880. He continued his training at the School of Military Engineering, Chatham from 1880 to 1884.

Nathan was sent to military expeditions to Sudan (1884–1885) and to Lushai, India (1889–1894). He was promoted to the position of captain in 1889 and became the secretary to the Colonial Defence Committee between 1896 and 1898. Nathan was promoted to major in 1898.

== Colonial career ==
Nathan was appointed acting governor of Sierra Leone from 1899 to 1900. Late that year, he was appointed as Governor of Gold Coast, a position he occupied until 1903. In 1902, Nathan imported into the Gold Coast a £543 French Gardner-Serpollet, paraffin-fired, steam-driven car for his use on the roads around Accra. He was appointed a Knight Commander of the Order of St Michael and St George (KCMG) in the 1902 Coronation Honours list published on 26 June 1902, and invested by King Edward VII at Buckingham Palace on 24 October 1902.

In 1903, Nathan was appointed as Governor of Hong Kong, a position he would serve until 1907. During his tenure, Nathan made use of his engineering background to establish a central urban planning and reconstruction policy. He built a major thoroughfare in the marshy area of the Kowloon Peninsula; derided at the time as "Nathan's Folly", it developed into a major shopping avenue, afterwards named Nathan Road. The construction of Kowloon-Canton Railway started under this period.

In 1907, Nathan was made Governor of Natal (until 1909). In that same year, he was raised to a higher rank of lieutenant colonel. In 1909 he returned to England and took up an appointment as secretary to the General Post Office, a position he served until 1911. He was chairman of the Board of Inland Revenue between 1911 and 1914.

== Under-Secretary for Ireland ==
Nathan was appointed Under-Secretary for Ireland in late 1914, shortly after the outbreak of World War I and the signing into law of the Home Rule Act 1914. His immediate superior was the Chief Secretary, Augustine Birrell. The Lord Lieutenant of Ireland was then largely a ceremonial position, and the Chief Secretary spent much of his time in London, where he was a member of the cabinet. Therefore, the Under-Secretary was effectively the head of the administration in Ireland.

Nathan's job involved liaising with the Irish Parliamentary Party (IPP) to prepare them for self-government. He was also concerned with recruiting in Ireland, and received regular reports from the police and military about anti-recruiting and pro-independence activity, including the threat of a German invasion or arms landing in support of an Irish rising.

Alarmed at the growing numbers of separatists in the Civil Service, Nathan wrote to the authorities to have them transferred to England, and eventually got cabinet approval for a letter warning civil servants that they would be dismissed if they continued as members of the Irish Volunteers. He used the Defence of the Realm Act 1914 to suppress newspapers that he considered seditious, against the advice of the IPP In general, however, he avoided any action that might provoke violence.

On 21 April 1916, Nathan was informed that a German boat had been stopped off the coast of County Kerry carrying arms and ammunition and that a man had been arrested after coming ashore from another vessel. The man arrested was subsequently identified as Sir Roger Casement

A mobilization of the Irish Volunteers fixed for Easter Sunday was cancelled the day before. Nathan, believing that a rising had been averted, rejected the insistent urging of the Lord Lieutenant, Lord Wimborne, to order the arrest of a large number of rebel leaders and the necessity of raiding premises associated with the Irish Volunteers and the Irish Citizen Army. Nathan cabled Birrell, the Chief Secretary, in London regarding Wilborne's demands. On Easter Monday, while he was in his office in Dublin Castle, the Easter Rising broke out and Dublin Castle itself was attacked. An elderly unarmed sentry, Constable O'Brien, was shot dead by Sean Connolly. A passing priest administered the last rites.

The Castle gates were closed, and the rebels did not press the attack, but Nathan was a virtual prisoner until troops arrived from the Curragh Camp on Monday evening. Nathan remained in the Castle for the rest of the week (being moved to the stables to accommodate the military), where he kept in contact with London, keeping the government up to date with the situation and helping to answer questions in Parliament.

The Rising came to an end on 30 April. The same day, Birrell offered his resignation, and on 3 May, at Birrell's request, Nathan also resigned. The Royal Commission on the 1916 Rebellion (the Hardinge commission) was critical of Birrell and Nathan, in particular their failure to take action against the rebels in the weeks and months before the Rising.

== Later career ==
After his resignation, Nathan was appointed secretary to the Ministry of Pensions, a position he held until 1919. In 1920, he was appointed Governor of Queensland and served in that position until 1925. It was to be his last post in the Colonial Service. During his tenure, Nathan actively promoted British migration to Queensland.

In 1922, he founded, along with Henry Caselli Richards, the Great Barrier Reef Committee. He was chancellor of the University of Queensland in 1922–25 and was awarded an honorary LL.D. in 1925.

After his appointment as governor expired, Nathan left Queensland for retirement in Somerset, England, where he died in the village of West Coker in 1939. He was buried at Willesden Jewish Cemetery, London.

== Honours ==
- Knight Commander of the Order of St Michael and St George, 1902
- Knight Grand Cross of the Order of St Michael and St George, 1908

== Places named after him ==
Nathan Road, the main commercial artery in the Kowloon Peninsula (otherwise known as the Golden Mile), was named after him.

In Australia, Nathan and Nathan Heights in Brisbane (the capital city of Queensland) and Nathan Street in the Canberra suburb of Deakin were named after him.

Nathan House, a boarding house for Form 2 learners at Maritzburg College in Pietermaritzburg, South Africa is named in his honour.

Scottburgh, South Africa has a street named after Sir Matthew Nathan.

== See also ==
- History of Hong Kong

== Footnotes ==
Government offices
Preceded by Sir Frederick Mitchell Hodgson	Governor of the Gold Coast; 1900–1903	Succeeded by John Pickersgill Rodger
Preceded by Sir Henry Arthur Blake	Governor of Hong Kong; 1904–1907	Succeeded by Sir Frederick Lugard
Preceded by Sir Henry Edward McCallum	Governor of Natal; 1907–1909	Succeeded by The Lord Methuen
Preceded by Sir Robert Chalmers	Chairman, Board of Inland Revenue; 1911–1914	Succeeded by Sir Edmund Nott-Bower
Preceded by Sir Hamilton Goold-Adams	Governor of Queensland; 1920–1925	Succeeded by Sir John Goodwin
