= William Forgan Smith =

Australian politician (1887–1953)

The Honourable William Forgan Smith
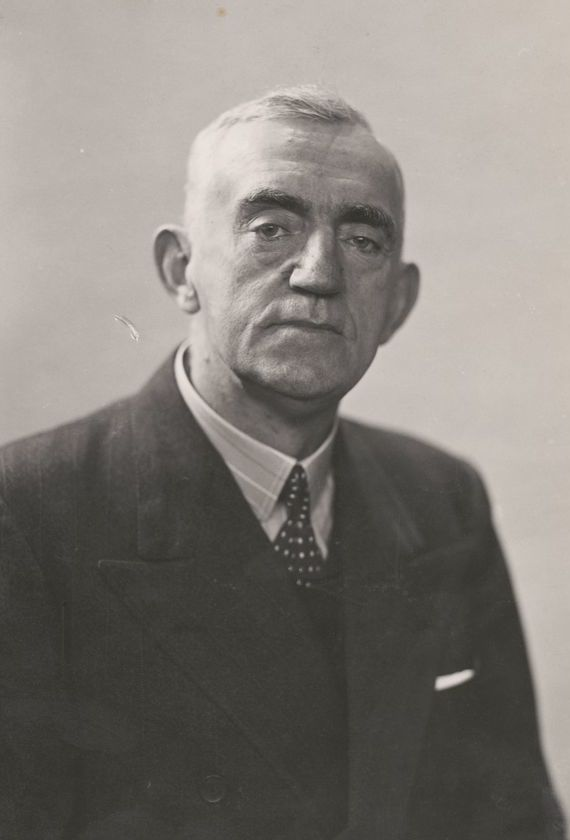
- Smith, c. 1942

24th Premier of Queensland
- In office 17 June 1932 – 16 September 1942
- Monarchs: George V Edward VIII; George VI
- Governor: Leslie Wilson
- Preceded by: Arthur Edward Moore
- Succeeded by: Frank Arthur Cooper

28th Treasurer of Queensland
- In office 17 June 1932 – 12 April 1938
- Preceded by: Walter Barnes
- Succeeded by: Frank Arthur Cooper

Leader of the Opposition of Queensland
- In office 27 May 1929 – 11 June 1932
- Preceded by: Arthur Edward Moore
- Succeeded by: Arthur Edward Moore

Member of the Queensland Legislative Assembly for Mackay
- In office 22 May 1915 – 9 December 1942
- Preceded by: Walter Paget
- Succeeded by: Fred Graham

Chancellor of the University of Queensland
- In office 15 December 1944 – 25 September 1953
- Vice Chancellor: John Douglas Story
- Preceded by: James Blair
- Succeeded by: Otto Hirschfeld

Personal details
- Born: William Forgan Smith; 15 April 1887 Invergowrie, Kinross-shire, Scotland, United Kingdom
- Died: 25 September 1953 (aged 66) Sydney, New South Wales, Australia
- Resting place: Toowong Cemetery
- Party: Labor
- Spouse: Euphemia Margaret Wilson (m. 1913)
- Occupation: Painter and decorator, Trade union official

William Forgan Smith (15 April 1887 – 25 September 1953) was an Australian politician. He served as Premier of the state of Queensland from 1932 to 1942. He came to dominate politics in the state during the 1930s, and his populism, firm leadership, defence of states' rights and interest in state development make him something of an archetypal Queensland Premier. He represented the Labor Party.

== Early life ==
Forgan Smith was born at Mynefield House, near Invergowrie, Perthshire, Scotland. His father was George Smith, the chief gardener at Airlie Castle. His mother was Mary, née Forgan. Forgan Smith was one of their seven children. He attended local schools before finishing at Dunoon Grammar School.

After his schooling, Forgan Smith apprenticed himself to a painter and decorator in Glasgow. He took an early interest in politics, joined the Scottish Labour Party, probably influenced by his observations of the poor conditions in the Clydeside shipyards and other working-class areas in Glasgow.

== Political career ==
=== Early career in Queensland ===
Forgan Smith emigrated to Queensland in 1912 hoping its warm climate would relieve a chronic bronchial condition. He was sponsored by a cousin in Mackay, where he settled, worked as a painter and decorator, and married a local farmer's daughter, Euphemia (Effie) Margaret Wilson (15 January 1913 – 12 October 1958).

Forgan Smith became involved in trade unionism and Queensland Labor politics. Mackay was then the centre of the sugar industry in Queensland and sugar remained a major priority for Forgan Smith throughout his career. Despite the fact that he was only 28 and had been in Queensland only three years, he was pre-selected to run for the seat of Mackay in the 1915 election as the Labor candidate. The election saw a decisive victory for Labor under T. J. Ryan, and Forgan Smith won the seat and entered Parliament.

Despite his youth and inexperience, it did not take Forgan Smith too long to adjust. When Prime Minister Hughes called for conscription to be introduced, Forgan Smith joined Premier Ryan in opposing it. This gave him recognition in the Queensland Labor Party, but made him a lifelong enemy in Hughes. Hughes misnamed him as "Hogan Smith, an Irishman from Glasgow" and accused him of speaking "Gaelic treason".

Forgan Smith read heavily on Parliamentary procedure; his knowledge meant he was made a temporary Chairman of Committees in 1917, a position which became permanent in 1920. Soon after, he entered Cabinet as a Minister without portfolio assisting the Premier. Both roles gave him ample opportunity to build a profile in Parliament and the party. In 1922 he became Minister for Public Works, where he administered a new system of unemployment relief and earned the respect of the Unions. In 1923 he was elected to the Queensland Central Executive of the Labor Party, a position which gave him considerable power. In 1925 he became Minister for Agriculture and Stock under Premier Gillies. By the end of 1925 he was Deputy Premier after only ten years in Parliament.

Queensland Labor suffered a surprising election loss in 1929, and Forgan Smith was elected leader of the party unopposed. As the Great Depression deepened, Forgan Smith knew that he had a good chance of victory in the next election. He concentrated on keeping his party held together, while trying to prevent the pro-Lang faction from gaining influence. He concentrated his criticism of the government of A. E. Moore on its decision to closely follow the Premiers' Plan, which Forgan Smith believed to be only making the depression worse.

=== Premiership ===
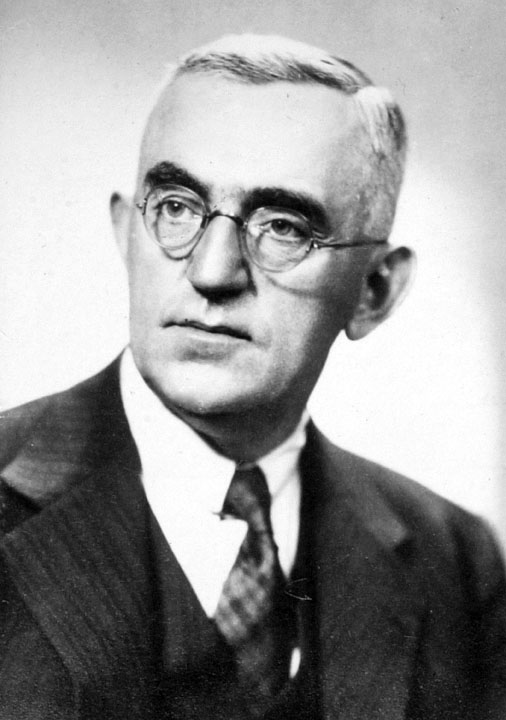
Smith in around 1933

Forgan Smith campaigned furiously in the lead-up to the 1932 election, travelling broadly around the state. He was rewarded when he came into government, as Premier of Queensland with a seven-seat majority.

Not content with the premiership, he also served as treasurer. Caucus elected a cabinet of generally moderate members – the radicalism of the Ryan Government had largely gone from the Queensland ALP by this time.

Forgan Smith's immediate challenge was dealing with the problem of how to respond to the Great Depression: in particular, the need to reduce unemployment. Notwithstanding his earlier rebukes of Moore's administration, he followed (as Moore had done) the principles of the Premiers' Plan, while simultaneously insisting that the federal government meet its contractual obligations. Determined to bring jobless figures in Queensland down, he moved to implement something akin to the New Deal of President Franklin D. Roosevelt, although his term of office predated Roosevelt's presidency by some nine months. Like Roosevelt, he owed much to the economic theory of John Maynard Keynes.

Forgan Smith was willing to raise taxes, especially on the wealthy and on corporations, in order to fund unemployment relief programs. He was successful in raising revenue from £5.6 million in 1932–33 to £8.6 million in 1938–39; in the process he turned Queensland into Australia's highest taxing state. The Commonwealth Bank also paid Queensland £920,000 as part of a program to aid the states. This money was put towards coupons and relief work.

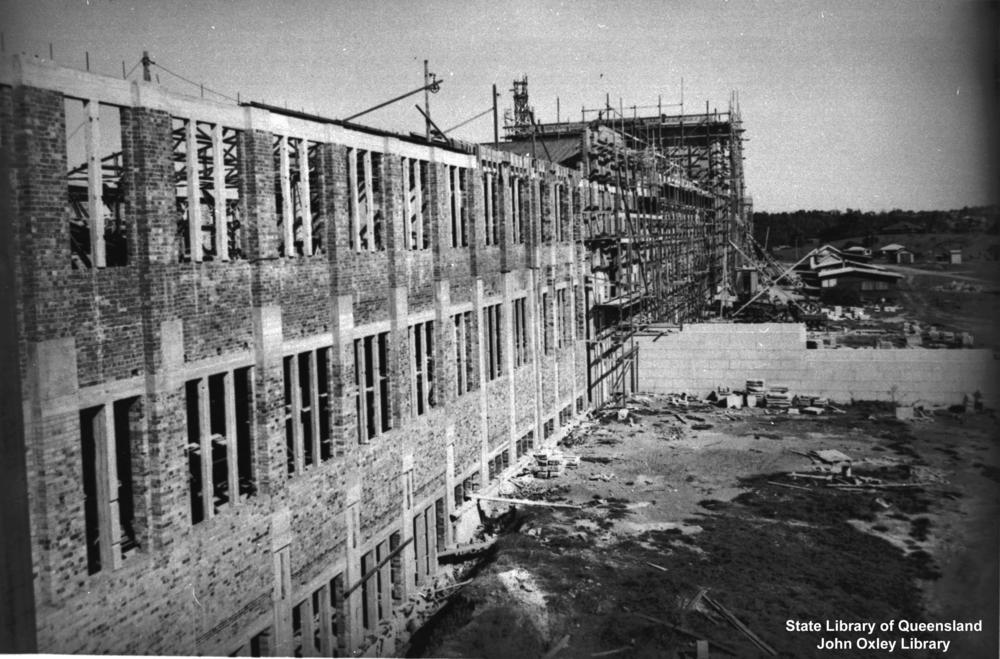
Construction of the Forgan Smith Building at The University of Queensland, 1940.

Along with most other Queensland premiers, before and since, Forgan Smith was an advocate of development. He put the relief programs to good use building infrastructure and undertaking other capital works projects. He embarked on a number of ambitious schemes, including the Story Bridge, an upgrade of Mackay Harbour, the Somerset Dam (which was not completed until after the end of his premiership) and a new building for the University of Queensland at St. Lucia that now bears his name. The relief was meant as a stop-gap measure. In some cases, local authorities took advantage of it, while in other cases, communities became dependent on it. For example, at one stage half of the workers of Coolangatta on the Gold Coast were on relief work. In 1938 relief work was abolished in favour of a permanent, long-term capital works program.

Under Forgan Smith's rule, the weekly payments received by relief workers were raised to the level of the basic wage (a measure financed by a graduated income tax), while a major public works programme was initiated which boosted job opportunities and provided the state which major constructions of lasting worth. When Minister of Agriculture back in 1926, Forgan Smith had established a faculty of agriculture at the University of Queensland. Now that he was premier, he established new faculties at the same university in Dentistry, Veterinary Science, and Medicine. As noted by Ross McMullin, the establishment of these new faculties 'was part of the co-ordinated development of the university and Queensland's health services.' In addition, a revitaliation of the state's health and welfare administration was carried out. In 1938, the Premier made the claim that Queensland enjoyed ‘the highest wage system, the best conditions of labour and the lowest unemployment’ in the country.

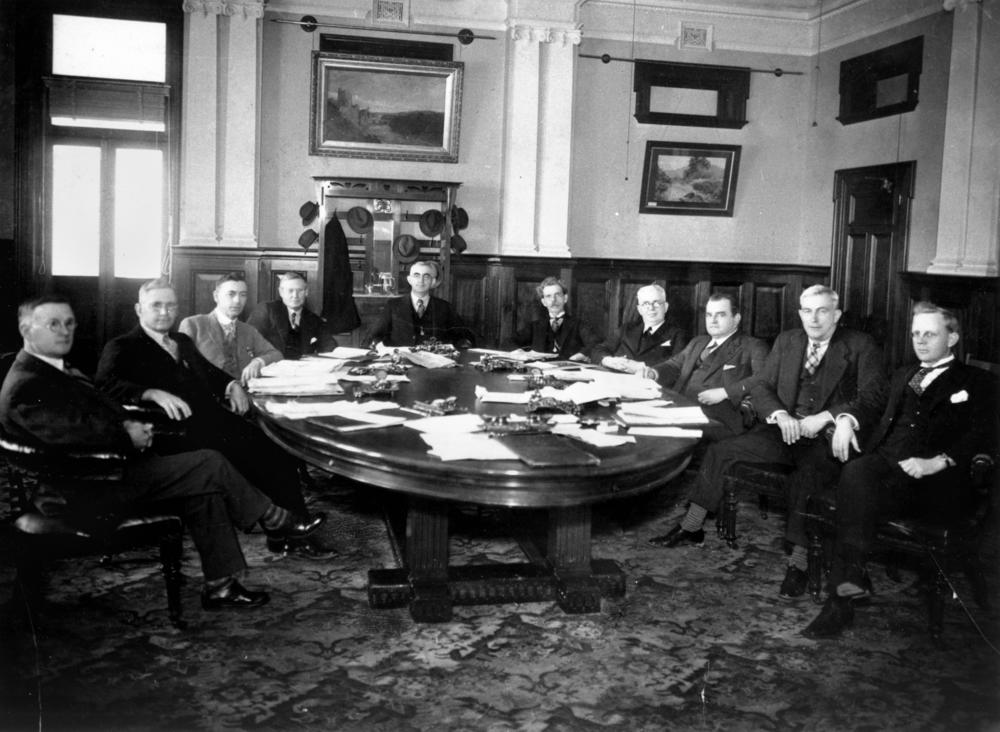
Smith and cabinet, ca 1932

Sometimes Forgan Smith incurred criticism for being authoritarian and dictatorial, although he was neither the first nor the last premier of his state to inspire such accusations. He used his strong and forceful personality to dominate the cabinet and parliament, and his government passed a number of controversial pieces of legislation. For instance, he added clauses to the 1936 Racing Bill which made it harder for reporters to find out and divulge information about proposed legislation, which drew heavy criticism from the press. The 1940 Public Safety Bill gave the state government unprecedented powers during wartime. Probably the most authoritarian of his government's measures, though, was the Transport Act of 1938, which allowed the Government to declare ‘State of Emergency’ in any part or all of the state, for any time, and for any reason. In such a case, the government's actions were effectively beyond legal challenge. Admittedly, these laws were more or less in line with similar ones passed in other jurisdictions (for example, the Official Secrets Act in the United Kingdom). Also, Forgan Smith never declared a state of emergency himself; it would fall to later Queensland leaders to take advantage of that power. He would regularly consult with his Ministers to reach a decision, and while he could be heavy-handed in manner, he sometimes took advice from subordinates.

The doctrine of states' rights meant a great deal to Forgan Smith, as it did to many of his predecessors and successors in the premiership. For example, he opposed the Uniform Tax Plan of 1942, even though it had been proposed by a federal ALP government under John Curtin. Many people expected Forgan Smith to make a move to federal politics himself, just as Ted Theodore had done. Nothing came of such notions. He seemed satisfied with his secure position in Queensland.

The first Queensland premier to make wide use of radio, Forgan Smith was an effective speaker, and he made a good impression on many of those who listened to him. Radio allowed him to reach a wider audience than he could otherwise have done, and he also travelled throughout the state, especially to turn the first sod on a new public works project. Though never flamboyant (and in fact somewhat dour in manner), he became respected and genuinely popular. Benefiting from a weak and divided parliamentary opposition (Moore being opposition leader 1932–1936, Edward Maher 1936–41, Sir Frank Nicklin thereafter), Forgan Smith easily achieved re-election in 1935, 1938, and 1941. With no overt antagonists inside his cabinet, he was able to depart of his own volition from the premiership, which he did on 16 September 1942, becoming Queensland's longest-serving Premier. Three months later Forgan Smith resigned from parliament.

A pragmatic and hard-working politician who rose, step by step, through careful planning, Forgan Smith was not dogmatic, nor did he do anything spectacular, preferring to busy himself with the minutiae of day-to-day administration. He claimed to be a socialist, although he was an ardent critic of communism. By his populism, his interests in education and state development, and his dominance of state politics throughout his time in office, he has sometimes invited comparisons with a later ALP leader of substantial electoral skill, Peter Beattie.

== Post-premiership career ==
For most of his remaining years Forgan Smith pursued his other interests, sugar and education. He became a member and then chairman of the Sugar Board and chairman of the Central Sugar Cane Prices Board. Subsequently, he became the Chancellor of the University of Queensland in 1944, occupying this position until his death in 1953.

== Personal life ==
Forgan Smith and his wife had two children.

Forgan Smith's family recalled him as being warm, humorous, and unpretentious, in contrast to his public image. He was a heavy drinker. Early in his public life, he moved with his family Yeronga, a suburb of the state capital, Brisbane. He lived there for most of the remainder of his life. For recreation, Forgan Smith golfed, played lawn bowls, and attended cricket matches.

Forgan Smith suffered from duodenal ulcers for much of his life. In the early 1940s, his bronchial condition was diagnosed as cancer of the larynx. While in Sydney on Sugar Board business, Forgan Smith died suddenly on 25 September 1953 from a heart condition caused by his cancer.

Forgan Smith was accorded a State funeral, the procession moving from St Andrew's Presbyterian Church to his burial place at Toowong Cemetery.

Political offices
Preceded by A.E. Moore	Premier of Queensland; 1932–1942	Succeeded by Frank Cooper
Preceded by A.E. Moore	Leader of the Opposition of Queensland; 1929–1932	Succeeded by A.E. Moore
Party political offices
Preceded by William McCormack	Leader of the Labor Party in Queensland; 1929–1942	Succeeded by Frank Cooper
Parliament of Queensland
Preceded by Walter Paget	Member for Mackay; 1915–1942	Succeeded by Fred Graham
