= William McCormack =

Australian politician; Premier of Queensland

The Honourable William McCormack
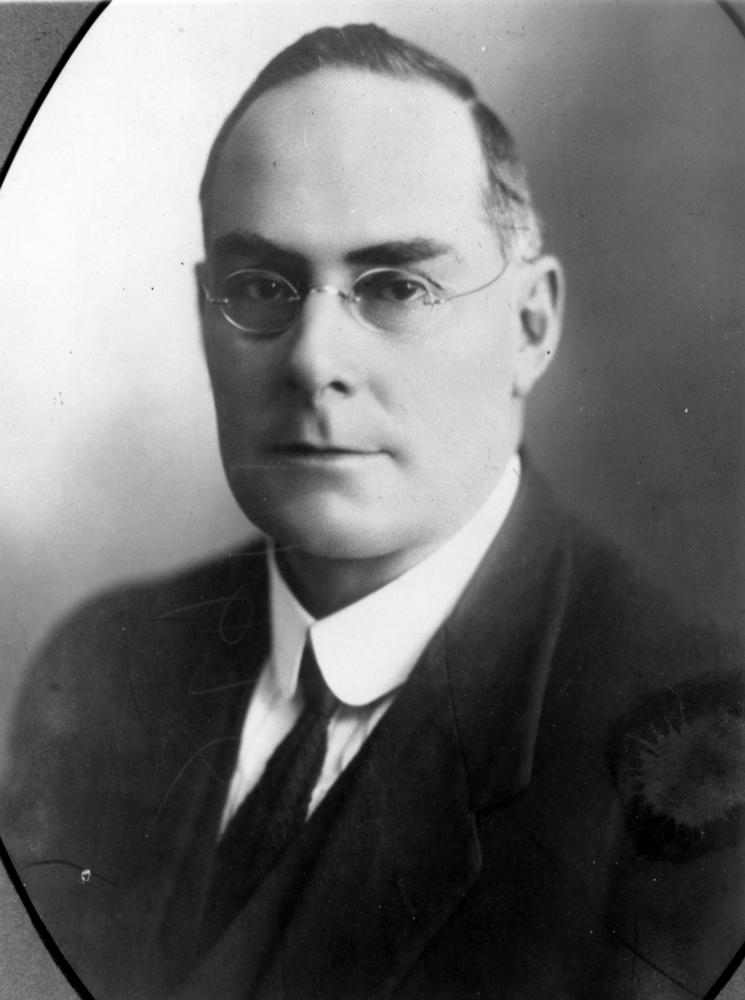

22nd Premier of Queensland
- In office 22 October 1925 – 21 May 1929
- Deputy: William Forgan Smith
- Preceded by: William Gillies
- Succeeded by: Arthur Edward Moore

Speaker of the Queensland Legislative Assembly
- In office 12 July 1915 – 9 September 1919
- Preceded by: William Drayton Armstrong
- Succeeded by: William Lennon

27th Treasurer of Queensland
- In office 22 October 1925 – 21 May 1929
- Preceded by: William Gillies
- Succeeded by: Walter Barnes

Member of the Queensland Legislative Assembly for Cairns
- In office 27 April 1912 – 21 February 1930
- Preceded by: John Mann
- Succeeded by: John O'Keefe

Personal details
- Born: 27 April 1879 St Lawrence, Queensland, Australia
- Died: 21 November 1947 (aged 68) Annerley, Queensland, Australia
- Resting place: Toowong Cemetery
- Party: Labor
- Occupation: Tin miner, Trade union organiser

William McCormack (27 April 1879 – 21 November 1947) was Premier of Queensland, Australia, from 1925 to 1929.

== Early life ==
McCormack was born on 27 April 1879 in St Lawrence, Queensland. He was the fourth of six children born to Mary (née Brennan) and Patrick McCormack; his mother was born in Ireland. His father owned a small grazing property, having previously worked as a carrier.

McCormack was educated at a local state school and subsequently worked as a prospector in the area around Mount Morgan. He moved to North Queensland in 1904 and worked on the Stannary Hills Tramways. He developed a friendship with Ted Theodore who introduced him to the labour movement. In 1908, McCormack became the inaugural vice-president of the Amalgamated Workers' Association of North Queensland (AWA). He led successful industrial action on the Etheridge railway line and oversaw a rapid increase in membership.

In 1909, McCormack was elected as the full-time paid secretary of the AWA, having been blackballed by employers due to his union activities. He became "North Queensland's most influential industrial leader", working towards amalgamations of smaller unions in line with the One Big Union ideal. He led a successful strike of sugar workers in 1911, reaching a favourable settlement on wages and employment conditions. He initially lent support to the 1912 Brisbane general strike, but considered the pretext for the strike to be flimsy and soon withdrew, gaining a reputation for pragmatism. The AWA merged into the Australian Workers' Union (AWU) in 1913 with McCormack becoming a vice-president of the AWU.

== Politics ==
McCormack entered politics as member for Cairns in the Queensland Legislative Assembly at the election of 1912, a seat he held until his retirement from politics in 1930.

After the 1915 state election, McCormack missed out upon a place in the ministry but was instead elected Speaker of the Legislative Assembly. He held the position until 1919 and then was appointed home secretary in Ted Theodore's government. In 1923 he instead became secretary of public lands.

In February 1925, McCormack was defeated by William Gillies in the ballot to succeed Theodore as ALP leader and premier. However, Gillies lasted only eight months in the position and was succeeded by McCormack in October 1925. He led the ALP to victory at the 1926 state election.

== Later life ==
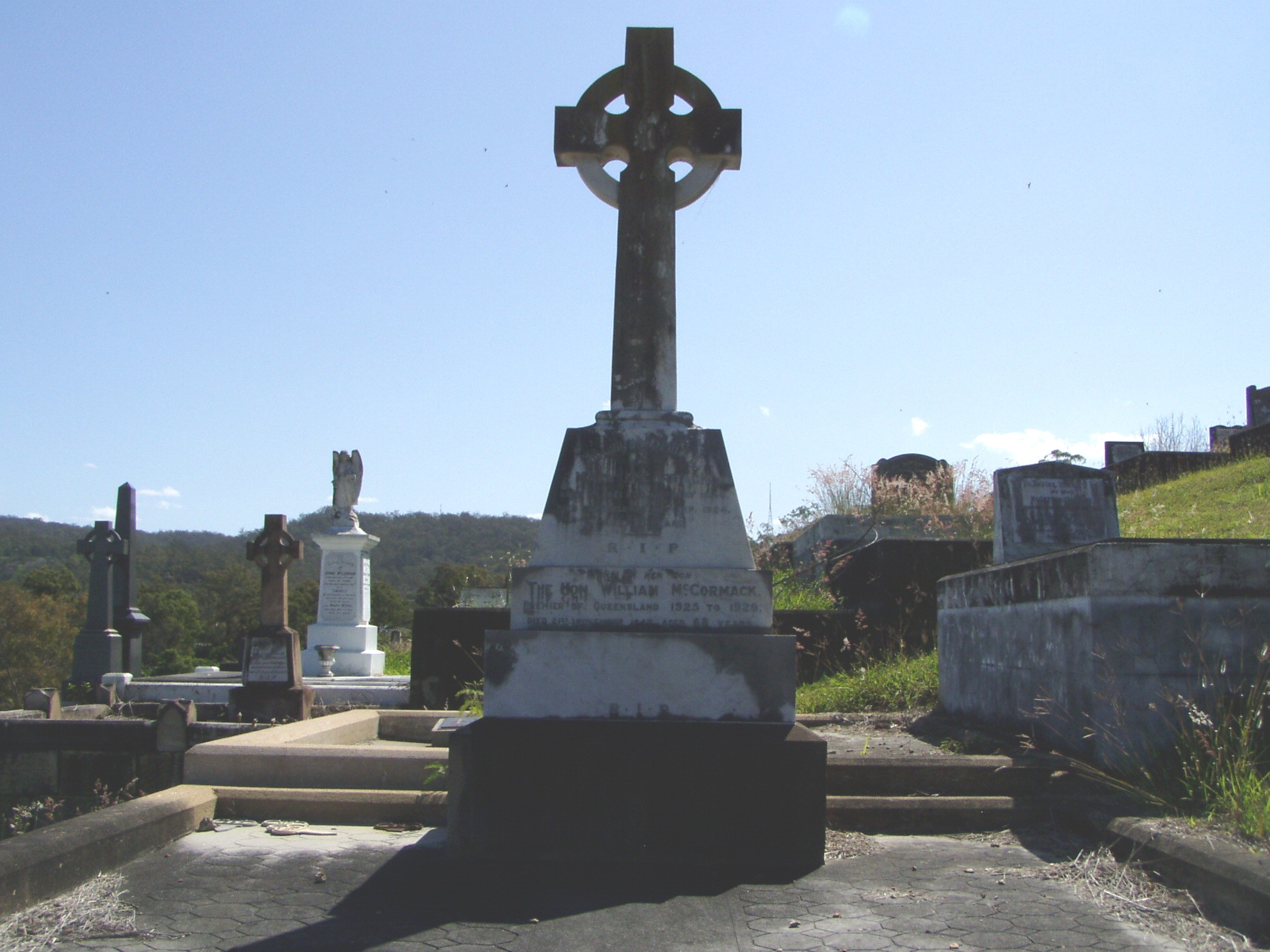
William McCormack's headstone at Brisbane's Toowong Cemetery

McCormack died in Brisbane on 21 November 1947 and was buried at the Toowong Cemetery. His funeral cortege proceeded from his Annerley residence to the cemetery.

Parliament of Queensland
Preceded by John Mann	Member for Cairns; 1912–1930	Succeeded by John O'Keefe
Preceded by William Drayton Armstrong	Speaker of the Legislative Assembly; 1915–1919	Succeeded by William Lennon
Political offices
Preceded by William Gillies	Deputy Premier of Queensland; 1925	Succeeded by William Forgan Smith
Preceded by William Gillies	Treasurer of Queensland; 1925–1929	Succeeded by Walter Barnes
Preceded by William Gillies	Premier of Queensland; 1925–1929	Succeeded by A.E. Moore
Party political offices
Preceded by William Gillies	Leader of the Labor Party in Queensland; 1925-1929	Succeeded by William Forgan Smith
