= Indigenous court =

An Indigenous court, also known as Aboriginal court, First Nations court, and other locally relevant terms, usually refers to specialist sentencing courts or modified court procedures for offenders who are Indigenous peoples of a colonised country. They include:

== Australia ==
- Circle sentencing, a process used with Indigenous repeat offenders in some jurisdictions of Australia
- Indigenous court (Australia)
  - Aboriginal Community Court in Western Australia (2006–2015)
  - Community court (Northern Territory) (2005–2012)
  - Koori Court in Victoria (2002–present)
  - Murri Court in Queensland (2002–2012, 2016–present)
  - Nunga Court in South Australia (1999–present)
  - Youth Koori Court in New South Wales (2015–present)

== Other countries ==
- Indigenous court (Canada)
- Indigenous court (New Zealand)

== See also ==
- Māori Appellate Court, New Zealand
- Māori Land Court, New Zealand
- Race in the United States criminal justice system
- Tribal court (United States)
  - Court of Indian Offenses, a federal tribunal in the United States with jurisdiction over Native Americans Indian territory lacking its own tribal court system
