= Indigenous Australians and crime =

Indigenous Australians are both convicted of crimes and imprisoned at a disproportionately higher rate in Australia, as well as being over-represented as victims of crime. As of September 2019, Aboriginal and Torres Strait Islander prisoners represented 28% of the total adult prisoner population, while accounting for 2% of the general adult population (3.3% of the total population). Various explanations have been given for this over-representation, both historical and more recent. Federal and state governments and Indigenous groups have responded with various analyses, programs and measures.

== Background ==
Many sources report over-representation of Indigenous offenders at all stages of the criminal justice system. As of September 2019, Aboriginal and Torres Strait Islander prisoners represented 28% of the total adult prisoner population, while accounting for 3.3% of the general population. Overrepresentation of indigenous people in crime statistics is not unique to Australia, indeed, in nearby New Caledonia and New Zealand their respective prison populations are approximately 90% Kanak and 52% Māori, respectively.

The links between lower socioeconomic status and the associated issues that come with it (inadequate housing, low academic achievement, poor health, poor parenting, etc.) to all types of crime are well-established, if complex, and disadvantage is greater in Indigenous communities than non-Indigenous ones in Australia.

These reasons have been well documented, as pointed out by National Aboriginal and Torres Strait Islander Legal Services (NATSILS) and the Aboriginal Legal Service of Western Australia (ALSWA). According to ALSWA these "have been repeatedly examined by numerous federal and state inquiries", and the reasons fall into two categories: "The first category are underlying factors that contribute to higher rates of offending (e.g., socio-economic disadvantage, the impact of colonisation and dispossession, Stolen Generations, intergenerational trauma, substance use disorder, homelessness and overcrowding, lack of education and physical and mental health issues). The second category is structural bias or discriminatory practices within the justice system itself (i.e., the failure to recognise cultural differences and the existence of laws, processes, and practices within the justice system that discriminate, either directly or indirectly, against Aboriginal people such as over-policing practices by Western Australia Police, punitive bail conditions imposed by police and inflexible and unreasonable exercises or prosecutorial decisions by police)."

A submission by Mick Gooda to a 2016 government report emphasised that the rates of crime and incarceration of Indigenous people could not be viewed separately from history or the current social context. He referred to Don Weatherburn's work, which showed four key risk factors for involvement in the criminal justice system: poor parenting (particularly child neglect and abuse); poor school performance and/or early school leaving; unemployment; and substance use. Indigenous Australians fare much worse than non-Indigenous citizens in relation to these four factors, and mental illness, including foetal alcohol spectrum disorders, and overcrowded housing also play a part.

== By category ==
=== Violent crime ===
The main source of information on homicides is the National Homicide Monitoring Program (NHMP), which was established in 1990 at the Australian Institute of Criminology. A 2001 study by Jenny Mouzos, using data from 1 July 1989 to 30 June 2000, showed that 15.7% of homicide offenders and 15.1% of homicide victims were Indigenous, while census statistics showed the rate of indigeneity of the population at around 2% in 2000 (since found to be too low a figure). The statistics were imperfect also because NHMP data is gathered from police records, which may not always identify race accurately, but an earlier review had reported "...although the statistics are imperfect, they are sufficient to demonstrate the disproportionate occurrence of violence in the Indigenous communities of Australia and the traumatic impact on Indigenous people.(Memmott et al. 2001, p. 6)". The study reported that the homicides were largely unpremeditated, and most occurred within the family environment, with alcohol involved.

The Aboriginal and Torres Strait Islander Women’s Task Force on Violence (2000, p. ix) reported that "The high incidence of violent crime in some Indigenous communities, particularly in remote and rural regions, is exacerbated by factors not present in the broader Australian community...Dispossession, cultural fragmentation and marginalisation have contributed to the current crisis in which many Indigenous persons find themselves; high unemployment, poor health, low educational attainment and poverty have become endemic elements in Indigenous lives...".

Age-standardised figures in 2002 showed that 20% of Indigenous people were the victims of physical or threatened violence in the previous 12 months, while the rate for non-Indigenous people was 9%. In 2011–2012, the percentage of Aboriginal homicide offenders decreased to 11% and victims to 13%.

=== Family violence ===
The 2001 homicide study found that most occurred within the domestic setting.

In 2002 the Western Australia government looked into the issue and conducted an inquiry, known as the Gordon Inquiry after its lead investigator, Aboriginal magistrate Sue Gordon. The report, Putting the picture together: Inquiry into response by government agencies to complaints of family violence and child abuse in Aboriginal communities, said that "[t]he statistics paint a frightening picture of what could only be termed an 'epidemic' of family violence and child abuse in Aboriginal communities."

Family violence and sexual assault were at "crisis levels" in the Indigenous community in 2004, according to Monique Keel of the Australian Institute of Family Studies.

=== Child abuse ===
The incidence of child abuse in Indigenous communities, including sexual abuse and neglect, is high in comparison with non-Indigenous communities. However, the data is limited, with most coming from child protection reports. The Australian Institute of Health and Welfare gathered data for 2008–2009 on children aged 0–16 who were the subject of a confirmed child abuse report. It showed that Indigenous children accounted for 25% of the reports, despite making up only 4.6% of all Australian children; there were 37.7 reports per 1,000 of Indigenous children and 5 reports per 1,000 of non-Indigenous children, that is, Indigenous children were 7.5 times more likely to be the subject of a child abuse report.

A 2010 report showed that child sexual abuse was the least common form of abuse of Indigenous children, in contrast to media portrayals. Incidents of all types of child abuse in Indigenous communities may be under-reported, for several possible reasons, including fear of the authorities; denial; fears that the child may be taken away; and social pressure.

The 2007 Little Children are Sacred report cited evidence that "child maltreatment is disproportionately reported among poor families and, particularly in the case of neglect, is concentrated among the poorest of the poor", and that socio-economic disadvantage is "closely related with family violence, being both a cause of child abuse... and a form of child abuse and neglect in itself". The Indigenous community is significantly poorer than the non-Indigenous community in Australia.

The Australian Human Rights Commission's Social Justice Report 2008 said that, despite the likelihood of under-reporting, the 2005−2006 ABS statistics for confirmed child abuse did not appear to support the "allegations of endemic child abuse in NT remote communities that was the rationale for the Northern Territory National Emergency Response".

=== Alcohol use ===
There is a link between alcohol use disorder and violence in Indigenous communities, but the relationship is complex and it is not straightforward causality. Some of the "underlying issues associated with alcohol use and dependence [include] educational failure, family breakdown, the lack of meaningful employment and economic stagnation" (Homel, Lincoln & Herd 1999; Hazelhurst1997).

The 2001 homicide study reported that over four out of five Indigenous homicides involved either the victim or offender or both, drinking at the time of the incident.

A 2019 report shows a decline in the use of alcohol, with a greater abstention rate than among non-Indigenous people, as well as in tobacco use.

=== Illicit drug use ===
There is a link between illicit drugs and crime. The 2004 Drug Use Monitoring in Australia (DUMA) annual report found that "37 percent of police detainees attributed some of their criminal activity to illicit drug use". However the relationship is complex. The drugs most often associated with violent crime (including domestic violence) in the whole Australian population are alcohol and methamphetamine.

Data from 2004–2007 showed that illicit drug use by Indigenous people over 14 years old was about twice as high as that of the general population. The data showed that 28% of Indigenous people aged 15 and above in non-remote areas had used illicit drugs in the previous 12 months, while the rate for non-Indigenous people in that age group in all areas was 13%. The illicit drugs most used by Indigenous people are cannabis, amphetamines, analgesics, and ecstasy. The increased usage may be related to the history of dispossession of Indigenous people and their subsequent socioeconomic disadvantage. Since the 1980s cannabis use by Indigenous people has increased substantially.

A 2006 study investigating drug use among Indigenous people in remote and rural communities showed that, while alcohol remained the primary concern, the "often heavy use of cannabis and increasing signs of amphetamine use" was having a negative impact on the communities. Drug offences constituted a very small proportion of charges in rural communities, but substance use primarily involved alcohol, cannabis, petrol and other solvents, and, increasingly, amphetamines.

A 2019 review reported that in 2016, 27% of Indigenous Australians used an illicit drug in the previous year, which was 1.8 times higher than for non-Indigenous Australians, at 15.3%. Cannabis use was especially prevalent: 19.4% had used cannabis in the last 12 months (1.9 times higher than non-Indigenous Australians, at 10.2%). 10.6% of Indigenous people had used a pharmaceutical for non-medical use (non-Indigenous 4.6%) and 3.1% had used methamphetamines (non-Indigenous 1.4%). The relationship to crime was not included in this report.

The relationship between use of illicit drugs and crime, excluding possession of the drug, is not clear. Arrests of consumers (whole Australian population) still constituted around 80% of all arrests in 2009–10, and cannabis-related crimes accounted for 67%.

=== Victims of crime ===
Indigenous Australians are over-represented as victims of crime, in particular assault. A 2016 ABS report found that they are more likely to be victims of assault than non-Indigenous people by ratios of 2.6 (in New South Wales), 6 (in South Australia), and 5.9 (in Northern Territory). Indigenous women are highly over-represented in this figure, accounting for a higher proportion of assault victims than the non-Indigenous category.

== Detainment and imprisonment ==
=== General statistics ===
In 2009, ABS figures showed that Indigenous people accounted for 25 percent of Australia's prison population. The age-standardised imprisonment rate for Indigenous people was 1,891 people per 100,000 of adult population, while for non-Indigenous people it was 136, which meant that the imprisonment rate for Indigenous people was 14 times higher than that of non-Indigenous people. The imprisonment rate for Indigenous people had increased from 1,248 per 100,000 of adult population in 2000, while it remained stable for non-Indigenous people. Indigenous men accounted for 92 percent of all Indigenous prisoners, while for non-Indigenous men the rate was 93 percent. 74 percent of Indigenous prisoners had been imprisoned previously, while the rate for non-Indigenous prisoners was 50 percent. Chris Graham of the National Indigenous Times calculated in 2008 that the imprisonment rate of Indigenous Australians was five times higher than that of black men in South Africa at the end of apartheid.

In 2014 in Western Australia, one in thirteen of all Aboriginal adult males was in prison. According to prison reform campaigner Gerry Georgatos, this is the highest jailing rate in the world.

The 2016 Australian Census recorded 798,400 Indigenous people (either Aboriginal Australians, Torres Strait Islander or both) in Australia, accounting for 3.3 percent of the population. The Australian Bureau of Statistics (ABS) reported that the total Aboriginal and Torres Strait Islander population in Australia aged 18 years and over as of June 2018 was approximately 2 percent, while Indigenous prisoners accounted for just over a quarter (28%) of the adult prison population.

Many sources report and discuss the over-representation of Indigenous Australians in Australian prisons.

The Australian Bureau of Statistics regularly publishes data sets regarding courts and prisons and victims. Series 4517 details imprisonment with tables 40, 41 and 42 specific to indigenous status. Series 4513 details courts and outcomes with tables 12-15 specific to indigenous status. Series 4510 details specifics of victims with tables 16-21 specific to indigenous status.

=== Health effects from incarceration ===
Negative health effects have been well researched and include mental health and well-being issues, grief and loss, violence and the need for family and community.

Social Justice Commissioner, Mick Gooda said in 2014 that over the previous 15 years, Indigenous incarceration had increased by 57%.

A large number of Indigenous Australians in imprisonment experience many problems, including malnutrition, disease, lack of opportunity, and erosion of their individual identity. Imprisonment can be a traumatic experience for any persons. There are many other factors associated with mental health effects while in custody, including psychological distress, life stresses, discrimination and domestic violence. A study has shown that 50% of males and 85% of Indigenous females reported medium or higher levels of psychological distress.

=== Deaths in custody ===
Death rates in prison are cause for concern. National reconciliation between Indigenous and non-Indigenous people has been tainted with suspicion that the running of the criminal justice system was against Indigenous Australians. After a large number of Aboriginal deaths in custody in 1987, the federal government ordered the Royal Commission into Aboriginal Deaths in Custody. The 1991 report of the same name found that the death rate in custody was similar for both Aboriginal and non-Aboriginal people, and that the high number of Indigenous deaths in custody was due to the disproportionate number of Indigenous people in prison custody relative to the number of non-Indigenous people—a factor of 29 according to a 1988 report by the Commission. RCIADIC concluded that the deaths were not caused by deliberate killing by police and prison officers, but that "glaring deficiencies existed in the standard of care afforded to many of the deceased". It reported that "Aboriginal people died in custody at the same rate as non-Aboriginal prisoners, but they were far more likely to be in prison than non-Aboriginal people", and that child removal was a "significant precursor to these high rates of imprisonment".

The issue resurfaced in 2004 when an Indigenous man, Mulrunji Doomadgee, died in custody in Palm Island, Queensland, an incident that caused riots on the island. The police officer who had custody of Doomadgee was charged with manslaughter, and was found not guilty in June 2007.

=== Women in prison ===
A 2017 report by the Human Rights Law Centre and Change the Record Coalition said that the lack of data on female prisoners and improvements which may flow from such data, led to higher rates of imprisonment. Indigenous women are 21 times more likely to be imprisoned than non-Indigenous women, the rate of imprisonment has grown faster than any other segment of the prison population. The rate of female Indigenous imprisonment has increased 148% since the 1991 RCIDIAC deaths in custody report. Among the 2017 report's 13 recommendations are that state and territory governments should establish community-led prevention and early intervention programs to reduce violence against women; the removal of laws that disproportionately criminalise Indigenous women (such as imprisonment for non-payment of fines); and that a Custody Notification Schemes (CNS) should be set up in every jurisdiction.

The 2018 ALRC Pathways to Justice report said that "Aboriginal and Torres Strait Islander women constitute 34% of the female prison population. In 2016, the rate of imprisonment of Aboriginal and Torres Strait Islander women (464.8 per 100,000) was not only higher than that of non-Indigenous women (21.9 per 100,000), but was also higher than the rate of imprisonment of non-Indigenous men (291.1 per 100,000)". Also "[Indigenous] women were 21.2 times more likely to be in prison than non-Indigenous women" (Summary, p. 8). The majority of female Indigenous prisoners have experienced physical or sexual abuse, and the rate of family violence is higher in Aboriginal and Torres Strait Islander communities than the general population. Added to this they have often suffered other trauma, housing insecurity, mental illness and other disabilities. The incarceration of women means that their own children (80% are mothers) and others who they may care for, may be harmed. One of the ALRC recommendations pertains to the amendment of fine enforcement procedures so they do not allow for imprisonment, as women are often in prison for this reason in some states, and Recommendation 11 pertains specifically to procedures relating to Aboriginal and Torres Strait Islander women.

Research into women in the criminal justice system in New South Wales commissioned by the Keeping Women Out of Prison Coalition (KWOOP) and published in March 2020, found that in the six years between March 2013 and June 2019, the number of incarcerated women had risen by 33%, to 946, and of these, almost a third were Indigenous. The overall growth of female prisoners was not due to a rise in crimes committed, but due to a 66% increase in the proportion of women on remand. The wait for bail of Indigenous women was between 34 and 58 days, but the majority of women were not given a sentence. The report also indicated that many more Indigenous than non-Indigenous women were sent to prison for similar crimes. The rate of imprisonment of all women had been rising, but for Indigenous women there had been a 49% increase since 2013, while for others the increase was 6%. Aboriginal and Torres Strait Islander Social Justice Commissioner June Oscar said "urgent action" was needed.

=== Refusal of bail ===
New South Wales studies in 1976 and 2004 found that Aboriginal people were more likely to be refused bail than the general population, being instead detained on remand awaiting trial. This is despite provisions in the Bail Amendment (Repeat Offenders) Act 2002 (NSW) aiming to "increase access to bail for Aboriginal persons and Torres Strait Islanders".

=== Children in detention ===
In 2019, the Australian Medical Association reported that around 600 children below the age of 14 are prisoners in youth detention each year, and 70 percent of them are Aboriginal or Islander children. Overall, Indigenous children are around 5 percent of the total youth population in Australia, but make up about 60 percent of the children in prisons. The Special Rapporteur on the Rights of Indigenous peoples from the United Nations Committee on the Rights of the Child had urged Australia to increase the age of criminal responsibility (10 years old in all states as of 2019), saying that children "should be detained only as a last resort, which is not the case today for Aboriginal and Torres Strait Islander children".

In 2018, it was revealed that all 38 children in detention in the Northern Territory were Indigenous.

In 2023, a 13-year-old Indigenous Australian boy spent 45 days in solitary confinement during a 60-day stint in custody according to a new report. The report also stated that the child spent 22 consecutive days in isolation.

=== Prisoners with disabilities ===
In August 2018, a senior research officer from Human Rights Watch reported, "I visited 14 prisons across Australia, and heard story after story of Indigenous people with disabilities, whose lives have been cycles of abuse and imprisonment, without effective support".

== Responses ==
Reports on the rates of Indigenous crime have focused on reducing risk by targeting the socio-economic factors that may contribute to such trends, such as education, housing and the lack of employment opportunities for Indigenous Australians.

=== Pathways to Justice report (2017) ===
The Attorney-General for Australia commissioned the Australian Law Reform Commission (ALRC) in October 2016 to examine the factors leading to the disproportionate numbers of Aboriginal and Torres Strait Islander peoples in Australian prisons, and to look at ways of reforming legislation which might ameliorate this "national tragedy". The result of this in-depth enquiry was a report titled Pathways to Justice – Inquiry into the Incarceration Rate of Aboriginal and Torres Strait Islander Peoples, which was received by the Attorney-General in December 2017 and tabled in Parliament on 28 March 2018. The report listed 13 recommendations, covering many aspects of the legal framework and police and justice procedures, including that fine default should not result in the imprisonment.

=== Police programs ===
As of 2020, various diversion programs in New South Wales have been having a positive effect on keeping Indigenous people out of prison. In Bourke, a project called Maranguka Justice Reinvestment has police officers meeting with local Indigenous leaders each day, helping to identify at-risk youth, and includes giving free driving lessons to young people. There have been reductions in domestic violence and juvenile offending, and an increase in school retention. Project Walwaay in Dubbo sees an Aboriginal youth team help to build relationships and engage young people in activities on a Friday night, which is now the second-lowest day of crime, compared with being the busiest day before. The activities are also a pathway to the Indigenous Police Recruitment Delivery Our Way (IPROWD), an 18-week program run through TAFE NSW, which encourages young people to become police officers. This was first run in Dubbo in 2008 and has now been expanded to other locations across the state.

=== Court options ===
There are different models in the various states and territories of Australia of modifying sentencing court processes to make the experience more culturally appropriate and effective for Indigenous defendants. These courts use Australian criminal laws to sentence Indigenous offenders, not customary laws. Apart from the modified courts, there are other initiatives that seek to make the court process more appropriate to the needs of Indigenous people, such as Aboriginal legal and victim support services, as well as published guides and courses that help educate judicial officers on how best to interact with Indigenous people in court.

==== Circle sentencing (NSW & ACT) ====
Circle sentencing is a process that puts Aboriginal adult offenders before a circle of elders, members of the community, police and the judiciary, who decide on the sentence, rather than a traditional courtroom. This alternative method was first trialled in New South Wales as the Circle Sentencing Court in Nowra in February 2002. This was an initiative of the Aboriginal Justice Advisory Council, and based on the Canadian model. Unlike most of the other Australian models, such as the Nunga Court in South Australia, the Circle Court caters for serious or repeat offenders. It "aims to achieve full community involvement in the sentencing process".

A further circle court was established in Dubbo in 2003, and as of 2004 others were planned for Walgett and Brewarrina.

More than 1,200 people had completed the program in New South Wales by February 2019. The process is used for a range of offences, such as those relating to driving, drug and alcohol, but not for serious indictable offences such as murder or sexual assault. Informed by the restorative justice approach, circle sentencing seeks to integrate Aboriginal customary tradition into the legal process. The NSW Bureau of Crime Statistics and Research (BOCSAR) analysed the program in 2008, looking at 68 participants, compared to a control group who had been dealt with through the local court. It found that the program had failed to reduce recidivism and showed that the program had not addressed the root causes of the offenders' criminal behaviour. In 2019, Director Don Weatherburn said that the program had had limited resources at that time, and the program had since been improved to deal with the causes of offending. He was confident that the forthcoming new review, with results due in 2020, would show more positive results. Anecdotally, the circles had seen a huge reduction in reoffending.

There are two circle sentencing courts in the Australian Capital Territory, as part of ACT Magistrates Court: the Galambany Court for adults, established in 2004, and the Warrumbul Circle Sentencing Court for young offenders (aged 10 to 17), both situated in Canberra City.

==== Indigenous/community courts ====
Indigenous or community courts comprise a variety of court models aimed at reducing recidivism by involving Indigenous communities in the sentencing process, focusing on factors underlying the criminal behaviour, and creating diversion programs. Various models have been used in several jurisdictions:

- Nunga Court in South Australia (1999–present)
- Koori Court, in Victoria (2002–present)
- Murri Court, in Queensland (2002-2012, 2016–present)
- Community Courts in the NT (2005–2012)
- Aboriginal Community Court in Western Australia (2006–2015)
- Youth Koori Court, in New South Wales (2015–present)

As of 2022 Koori Court is the only Indigenous sentencing court in an indictable jurisdiction in Australia.

==== Federal ====
At the federal level, the Federal Circuit and Family Court of Australia operates an "Indigenous List", in which modified processes catering to Aboriginal and Torres Strait Islander people are employed. These are run in six locations: Adelaide, Alice Springs, Brisbane, Darwin, Melbourne, and Sydney.

== See also ==
- Aboriginal Community Court
- Australian Human Rights Commission
- Crime in Australia
- Crime in the Northern Territory
- Crime in Western Australia
- Don Dale Youth Detention Centre
- Law enforcement in Australia
- Law of Australia
- National Aboriginal and Torres Strait Islander Social Survey
- Race and crime
- Royal Commission into the Protection and Detention of Children in the Northern Territory
