= Murri people =

Aboriginal Australian people

Murri People
Regions with significant populations
- Queensland, North West New South Wales

Languages
- Australian English, Australian Aboriginal English, Maric languages (e.g. Darumbal), Bundjalung, Djabugay, Dyirbal

Related ethnic groups
- Koori peoples, Nunga, Nyoongar, Palawah, Wangai, Yamatji

Murri is a demonym for Aboriginal Australians of modern-day Queensland and north-western New South Wales. For some people and organisations, the use of Indigenous language regional terms is an expression of pride in their heritage. The term includes many ethno-linguistic groups within the area, such as the Kamilaroi (Gamilaraay) and Yuggera (Jagera) peoples.

Many Murri people play rugby league, and the annual Murri Rugby League Carnival is a big event in the sporting calendar.

== History ==
Many Murri were forcibly removed from their land, and placed on missions and Aboriginal reserves with other tribes with whom their relations may not have been friendly. From 1900 until 1972, a substantial number of Murri children became part of the Stolen Generations.

Along with all Australian Aboriginal people they were given suffrage in 1962 for federal elections, along with free access to Musgrave Park.

The radio station Murri Country has been broadcast since 6 April 1993. It is operated by Brisbane Indigenous Media Association Ltd.

== Ethno-linguistic groups ==
Many of the Murri peoples spoke languages of the Mari family, which was named after the Murri people, but ethnicity and language classifications do not correspond completely. Specific ethno-linguistic groups include:

- Butchulla (Batjala)
- Baruŋgam
- Bayali
- Birri Gubba (Birigaba, Biria)
- Bundjalung
  - (see also Yugambeh-Bandjalangic peoples)
- Darumbal
- Djabugay
- Dyirbal (Jirrbal)
- Gangulu
- Goreng Goreng
- Gubbi Gubbi
- Guwinmal (Koinjmal)
- Jandai
- Kamilaroi (Gamilaraay)
- Mamu
- Turrbul
- Wakka Wakka
- Wangaibon
- Weilwan (Wayilwan)
- Wik peoples such as the Wik Munkin
- Yuggera (Jagera)

== Murri Courts ==
Murri Courts, a type of specialist community court for sentencing Aboriginal and Torres Strait Islander people in Queensland, were established in August 2002. After being closed down by the government in September 2012 as a cost-cutting exercise, they were reopened in April 2016 under the Palaszczuk government.

== Sport ==
Since 2011, the annual Murri Rugby League Carnival has been held with the support of the Arthur Beetson Foundation and the Deadly Choices organisation. Through the four-day Carnival, players are selected to represent the Queensland Murri Rugby League team to participate against touring teams in Australia or other countries.

== Terminology ==
For some people and organisations, the use of Indigenous language regional terms is an expression of pride in their heritage. There are a number of other demonyms, or names from Australian Aboriginal languages commonly used to identify groups based on geography:

- Anangu in northern South Australia, and neighbouring parts of Western Australia and Northern Territory
- Pama in northern Queensland
- Koori in New South Wales and Victoria
- Nunga in southern South Australia
- Noongar (or Nyoongar) in southern Western Australia
- Palawa (or Pakana) in Tasmania
- Wangai in central Western Australia
- Yamatji in the Gascoyne and Pilbara regions of Western Australia
- Yolngu in Arnhem Land, Northern Territory

== Notable Murri people ==
- Ben Barba, rugby league footballer
- Matt Bowen, rugby league footballer
- Kev Carmody, singer/songwriter
- Wesley Enoch, playwright and artistic director
- Dane Gagai, rugby league footballer
- Justin Hodges, rugby league footballer
- Jackie Huggins, historian and writer
- Rita Huggins, Aboriginal activist
- Marcia Langton, writer and academic
- Robert Lui, rugby league footballer
- Leah Purcell, actress, film director and writer
- Chris Sandow, rugby league footballer
- Johnathan Thurston, rugby league footballer
- Travis Waddell, rugby league footballer
- Chelsea Watego, academic and writer
- Quaden Bayles, actor
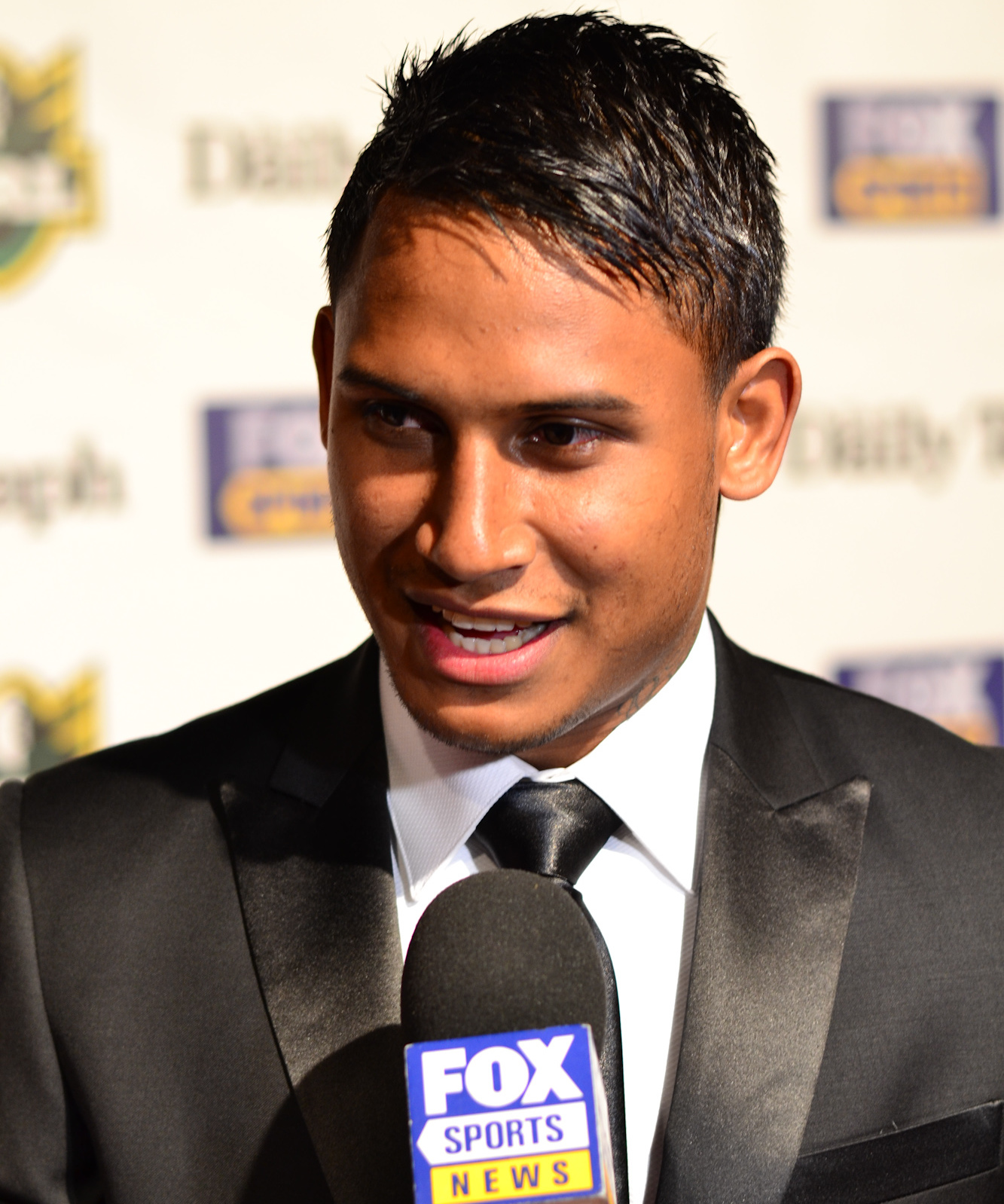
Ben Barba

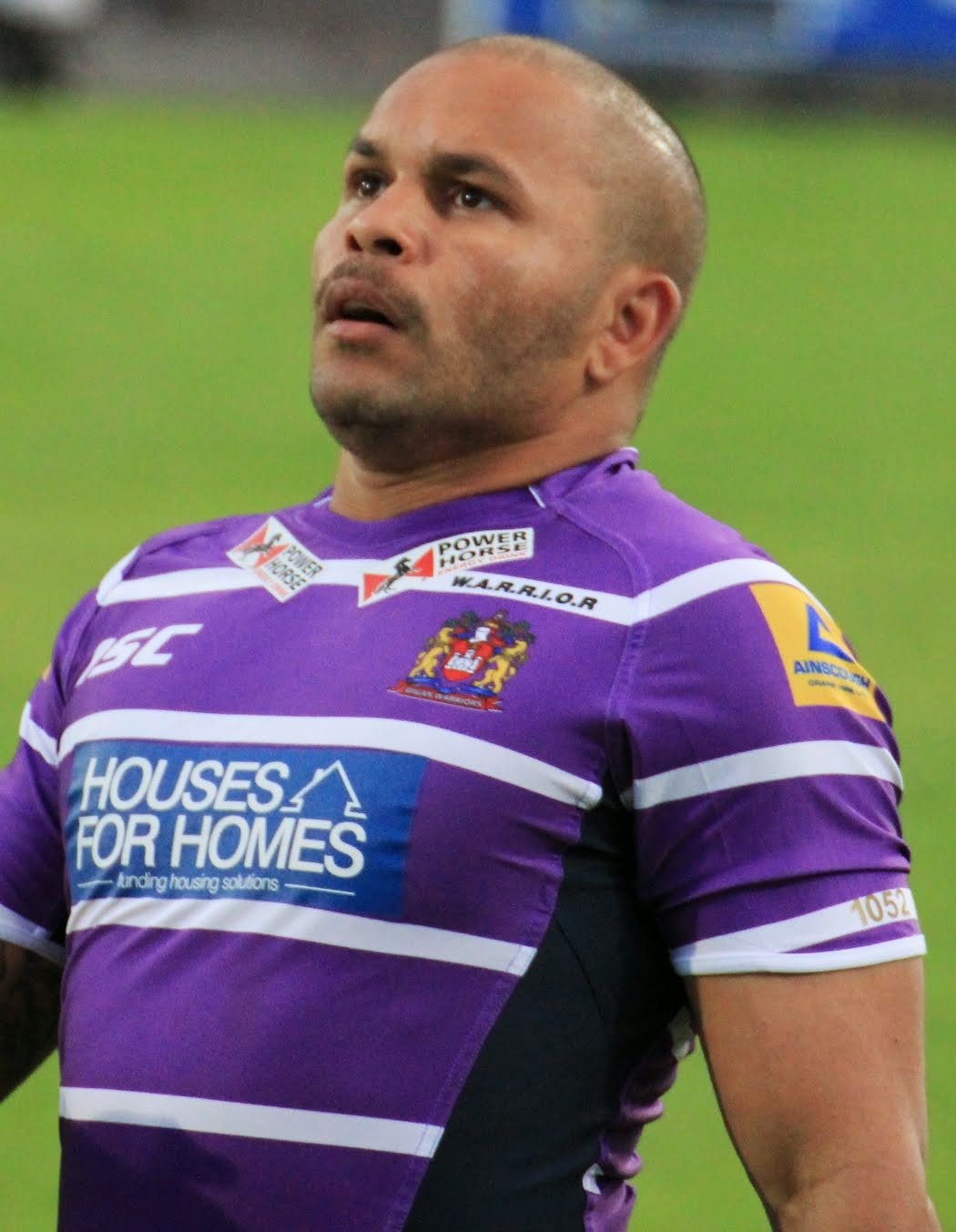
Matt Bowen

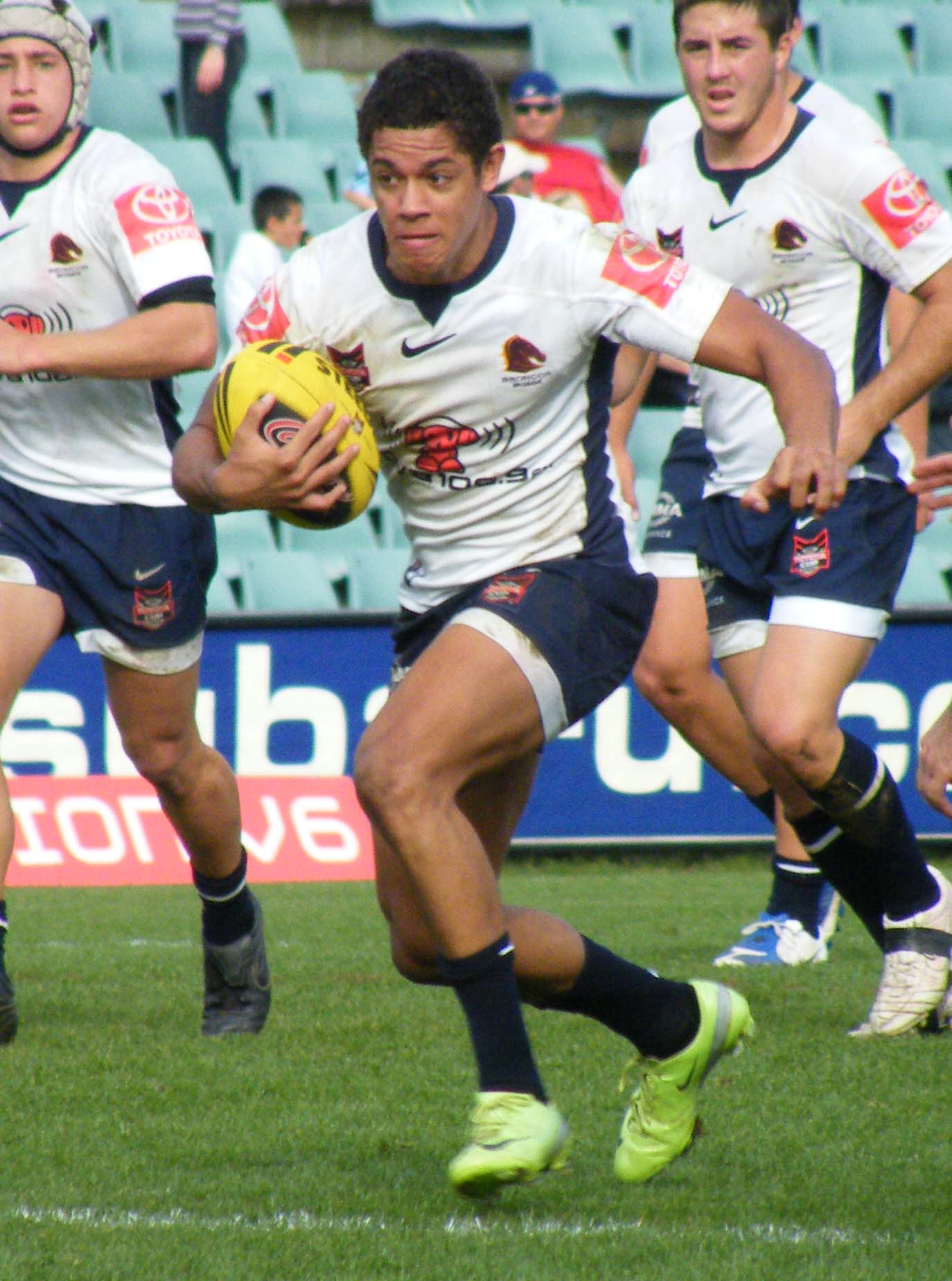
Dane Gagai

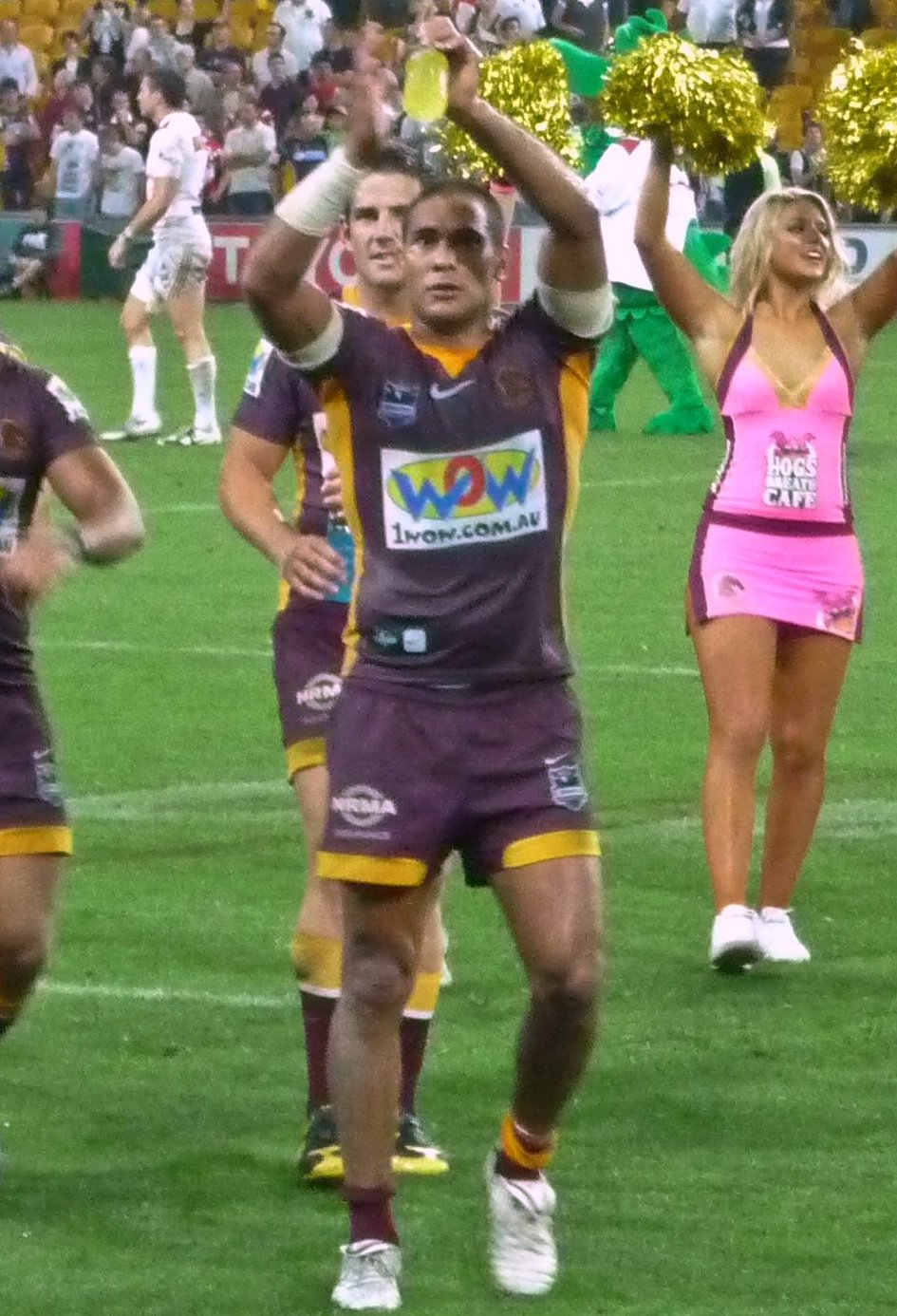
Justin Hodges

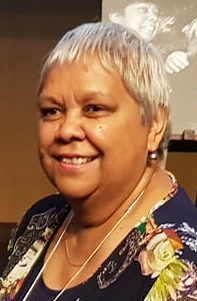
Jackie Huggins

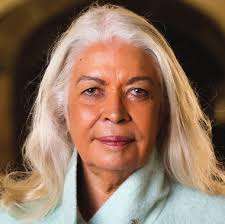
Marcia Langton

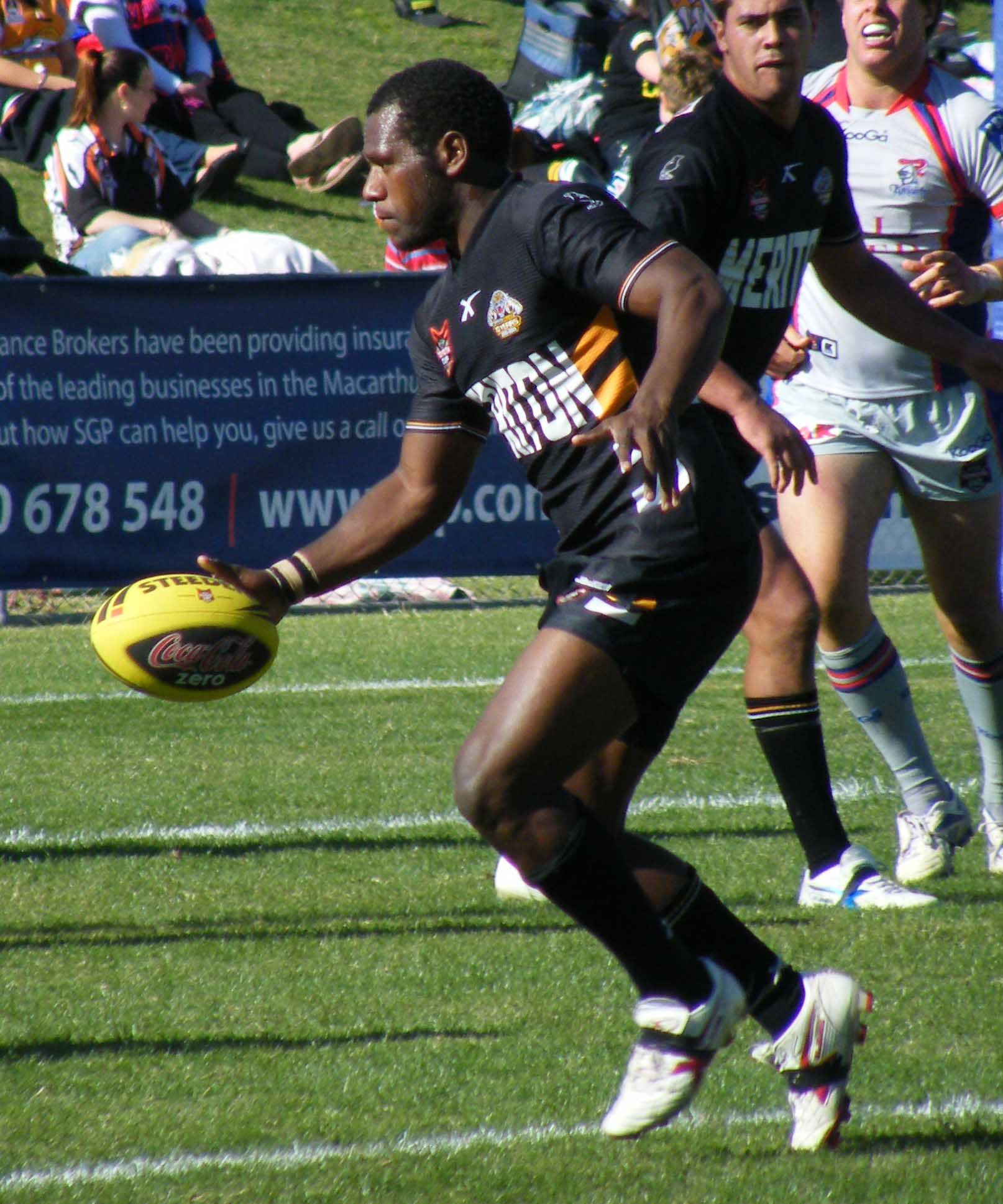
Robert Lui

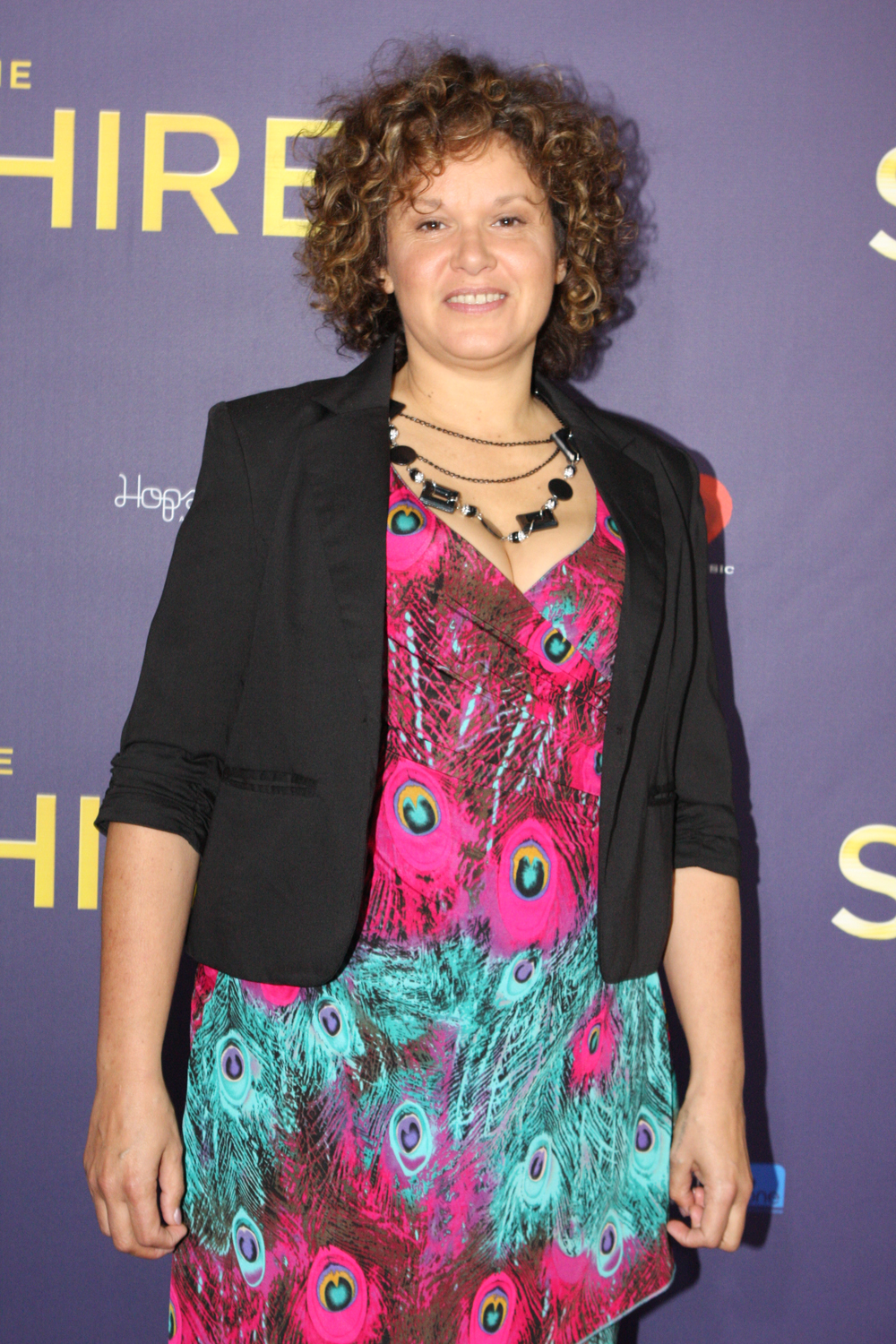
Leah Purcell

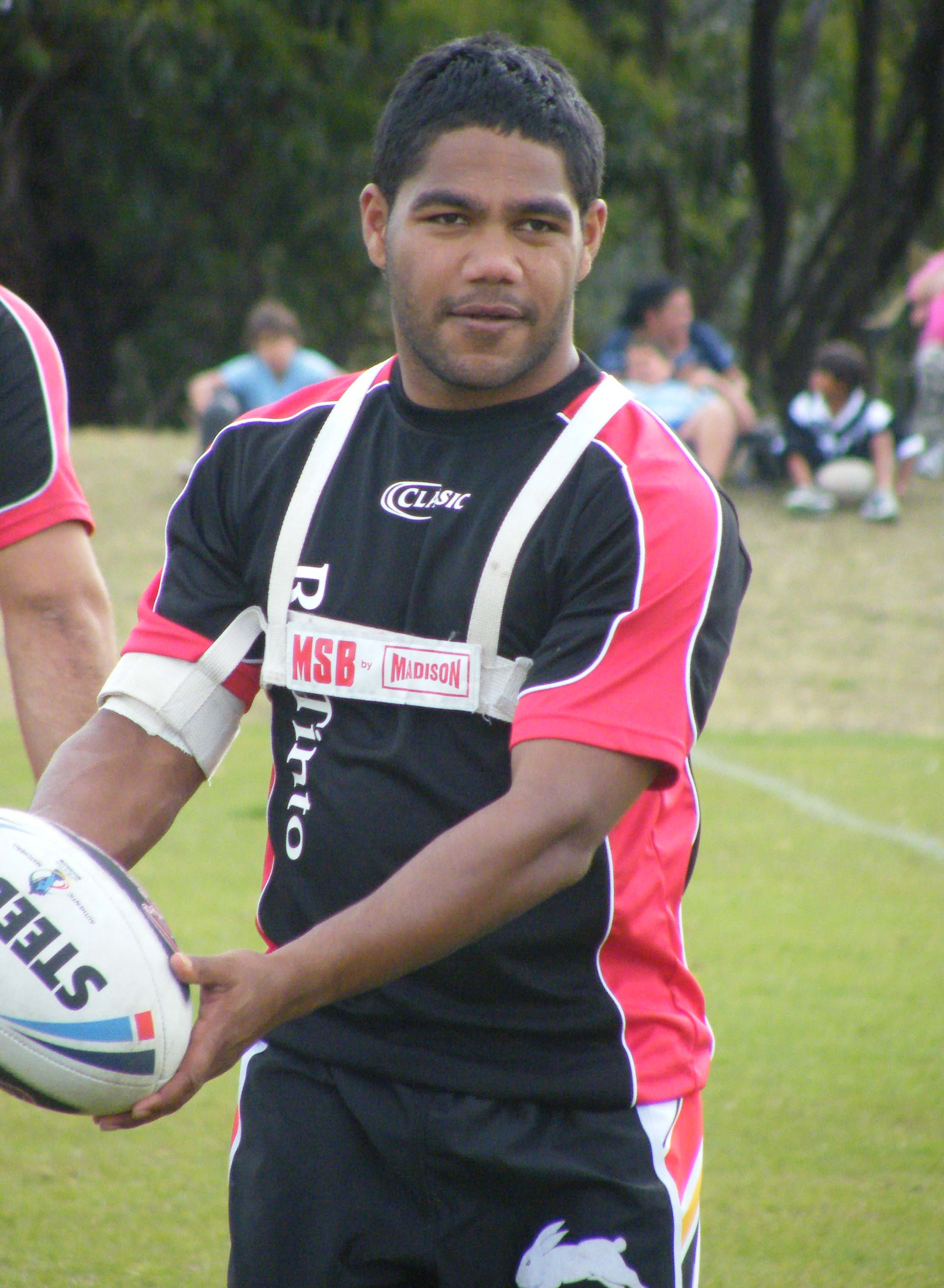
Chris Sandow

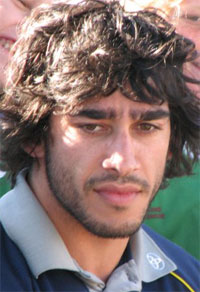
Johnathan Thurston

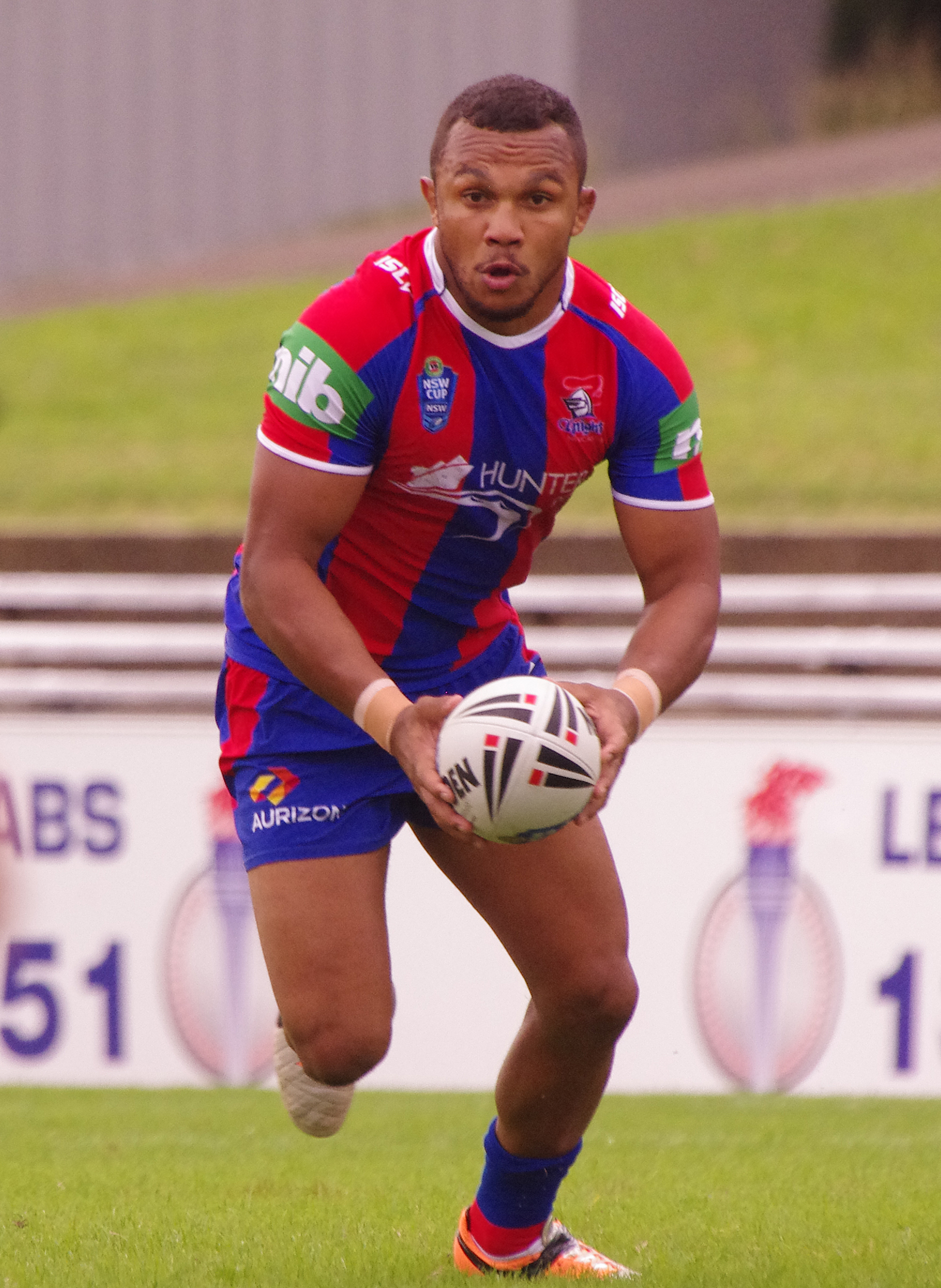
Travis Waddell

== See also ==
- Indigenous Collection (Miles District Historical Village)
- Murri Country, a radio station in Brisbane, Australia
- Murri School, a school in Brisbane

== Sources ==
- "Bringing them Home - The Report: 5 Queensland". Reconciliation and Social Justice Library. Human Rights and Equal Opportunity Commission. Archived from the original on 17 August 2000 – via Australasian Legal Information Institute.]
- "Qld Government announces closure of Murri courts program for Indigenous offenders". Australian Indigenous HealthInfoNet. Source: The Queensland Times and The Satellite. 3 October 2012. Archived from the original on 22 March 2014.
