= Aboriginal Community Court =

Specialised form of court used for Indigenous offenders in Western Australia

Aboriginal Community Court, or Aboriginal court was the name given to the specialised courts dealing with Indigenous Australian offenders in the state of Western Australia between 2006 and 2015.

The proceedings were conducted in the Magistrates Court of Western Australia.The court was not an actual court of law, but was the commonly referred to designation of the court when dealing with Indigenous offenders accused of crime, to show its distinctiveness from the usual procedures involved in that criminal court, and to demonstrate that the same court structure deals with both Indigenous and non-Indigenous offenders. The court allowed the involvement of the Australian Aboriginal and Torres Strait Islander communities in the sentencing process.

== Background ==
The involvement of Indigenous Australians in the criminal court system has been trialled a number of times in Western Australia. The earliest is perhaps in 1930 when the State government established the Court of Native Affairs. This court dealt exclusively with criminal offences between Australian Aboriginal people against other Australian Aboriginal people. The court ceased to operate in 1954 and was criticised for removing important legal rights for Aboriginal defendants. Defendants were dealt with under tribal law rather than the general criminal law, and probably received sentences more severe than if dealt with under the general law. Another area of Indigenous involvement was in the 1970s in the Kimberley region where magistrates informally invited Aboriginal elders to sit with them when dealing with Aboriginal offenders. A few decades later, magistrates informally held what was called the "Wiluna Aboriginal Court" at Wiluna, Western Australia in 2001 and also the "Yandeyarra Circle Court" at Yandeyarra Community in 2003.

There is an over-representation of Aboriginal people in the criminal justice system, including prisons in Australia. As of 2007 Aboriginal Australians in Western Australia comprised between 3 and 4% of the general population, but more than 42% of prisoners in custody. Indigenous courts are one method in which the Western Australian Government is attempting to remedy this imbalance.

The establishment of the Aboriginal Community Court was a recognition of the benefits of "circle sentencing". These were local initiatives by presiding stipendiary magistrates and did not reflect a whole-of-government approach.

== History ==
The Aboriginal Communities Act 1979 (WA) established the system of "Aboriginal courts" in Western Australia, largely through the efforts of Terence Syddall MBE who worked as a stipendiary magistrate in the north-west. He had introduced the practice of inviting local elders to join him in the courtroom during proceedings involving Aboriginal defendants, and afterwards discussed possible penalties with them. The Western Australian Government asked him in 1977 to conduct an inquiry into Aboriginal law and to create a plan that would help Aboriginal communities in the Kimberley to understand "whitefella" law. It was intended that any decisions made following the inquiry could, if appropriate, be later introduced in other parts of the state. Following this inquiry and report, the "Aboriginal court" system was established in Western Australia in 1980, on an experimental basis, La Grange (Bidyadanga Aboriginal Community) and One Arm Point. There were varying views by different governments on the effectiveness of these courts. A 1985 study commented on its failure to incorporate local customary laws.

In 1986, the Australian Law Reform Commission published a report entitled Recognition of Aboriginal Customary Laws, which investigated "whether it would be desirable to apply, either in whole or in part, Aboriginal customary law to Indigenous peoples—generally or in particular areas or to those living in tribal communities only".

The first Aboriginal Community Court was established in Norseman, and the second, a pilot, in Kalgoorlie-Boulder in 2006, about year later, both by magistrates Kate Auty and Denis Temby. The pilot was set up with the intention of providing an experience of the sentencing court that is less intimidating to Aboriginal people than the standard system.

After an information-gathering exercise that included interviews with court coordinators, magistrates, police prosecutors, staff and panellists from the Victorian Koori Court and Aboriginal Legal Service of Western Australia (ALSWA) staff, ALSWA prepared a submission on the pilot courts in the period November 2008 to May 2009. The report, containing 10 recommendations, was submitted to then Attorney-General of Western Australia, Christian Porter. It supported rolling out more similar courts throughout WA, particularly in remote communities, after consultation with stakeholders, with Warburton suggested as a possible location for the next one.

The system was shelved in 2015, along with other WA specialist courts, due to lack of evidence of a reduction in re-offending when compared to the mainstream system. However there had been an overwhelmingly positive response to the courts in 2009 with regard to the positive effect the courts were having on the offenders, increasing their respect for the legal system, as well as improving relations with Indigenous communities. Recidivism rates had improved at Norseman, attributed to the time taken to discuss the background of the offender; more appropriate sentencing options; and the participation of elders and respected persons. The Law Society of Western Australia supports the establishment of further Aboriginal courts in Australia in general, and the re-introduction of First Nations specialist courts in WA. Aboriginal Legal Service CEO Dennis Eggington said the court "had been set up to fail because of a lack of resources in the community to address the underlying causes of offending", and that Victoria and New South Wales systems worked well because they were properly funded.

== Procedure ==
The WA model differed from other Indigenous courts established around Australia, such as the Koori Court in Victoria and the Murri Court in Queensland (2002 to 2012), where there were separate and distinct courts to deal with Indigenous offenders. The WA Aboriginal Community Court was not established as a court in its own right; the court was actually the Magistrates Court of Western Australia, the State's main criminal court dealing with summary criminal matters. (Summary criminal matters are generally less serious criminal matters, as serious crime is dealt with by either the Supreme Court of Western Australia of the District Court of Western Australia.) The jurisdiction of the court was therefore the same jurisdiction of a magistrates court, and all the appeal and review processes were available to an offender in the usual manner. It allowed senior members of the local community to be involved in and express their views upon the particular crime and to be part of the sentencing process. The court was conducted in a fairly informal manner with the magistrate seated at a table. A major goal of the court was to make sentencing orders that are appropriate to the background and situation of the offender.

The court differed from other Indigenous courts in Australia in that it does not operate under any specific guidelines other than the existing criminal law that applies to every resident in Western Australia. This led to criticism of the court in that it is considered that its practices and procedures are ad hoc, and dependent on the presiding judicial officer hearing the case. This can be seen as a benefit as it provides a degree of flexibility in dealing with individual proceedings, but can however deliver less certainty to the participants in the process, as each case may be treated differently. In other states, similar courts operate under special legislation. In New South Wales for example, this is the "circle sentencing" legislation where laws specify how circle sentencing operates in that state.

One myth about the court is that the court established a separate law for Indigenous offenders. It was claimed this court applied tribal law to Indigenous offenders, which may actually justify the person's criminal conduct. The Law Reform Commission of Western Australia refuted this criticism, pointing out that offenders were sentenced under the same laws as any other offender, and that they are not subject to separate tribal laws.

Participation in the court was voluntary, and offenders were eligible to participate only if they plead guilty to the offence for which they have been charged. Participation in the program was available for any type of offence, although some family violence and sexual offences were excluded. In an Australian Law Reform Commission report, it was noted that participants in these types of courts report higher levels of satisfaction with the criminal justice system than the usual British based legal proceedings.

== Constitution of the court ==
As the court is actually a magistrates court, the court is constituted by a magistrate and not by the Aboriginal community. There is a pool of six Aboriginal elders who are available to sit with the court. The magistrate presides, facilitates, and ultimately determines the appropriate sentence for the offender. The elder's role is to provide the court with information on the background of the offender, point out the aspects of the offence as they relate to the offender, the impacts they have on the community and the effect it has had on the victim of the crime. The elder may also explain the proceedings to the offender in a culturally sensitive manner.

The prosecutor continues to present the facts of the case and makes submissions as necessary on the crime. The offender participates in the process by agreeing to adhere to the community process involved. Lastly, the victim is encouraged to be part of the process and to outline the impact of the crime upon them. However, it is not compulsory for the victim to be involved if they do not wish to.

As the proceedings are actually a case in the Magistrates Court, all the usual appeal processes that apply in that court continue to apply.

== See also ==
- Community court
- Community court (Northern Territory) (2005–2012)
- Koori Court, in Victoria (2002–present)
- Murri Court, in Queensland (2002-2012, 2016–present)
- Nunga Court in South Australia (1999–present)
- Youth Koori Court, in New South Wales (2015–present)

== Sources ==
- "Chapter Five: Aboriginal Customary Law and the Criminal Justice System", Aboriginal Customary Laws Final Report (2006). Law Reform Commission of Western Australia (Catalogue entry of the whole work)
- "Project Papers on the Review of the criminal and civil justice system in Western Australia: Consultation Papers" (June 1999) Law Reform Commission of Western Australia
- Marchetti and Daly (2004), 'Indigenous courts and justice practices in Australia', Trends & Issues in Crime and Criminal Justice, No. 277.
- Youth Justice Conferencing and Re-Offending (July 2005). Hennessey Hayes & Kathleen Daly, School of Criminology and Criminal Justice, Griffith University, Brisbane.
- Miller, Barbara. "Crime Prevention and Socio-Legal Reform on Aboriginal Communities in Queensland" Aboriginal Law Bulletin, [1991] 18, 1(49) Aboriginal Law Bulletin 10
