= Nunga Court =

Specialist community court for Aboriginal people in South Australia

The Nunga Court, also known as Aboriginal Sentencing Court, is a type of specialist community court for sentencing Aboriginal people in South Australia. Such courts exist at several locations throughout the state, as a sentencing option for eligible Aboriginal and Torres Strait Islander offenders who plead guilty of an offence.

The South Australian model was the first court of its type to commence operation in Australia in 1999, and other states have since used the model to fashion their own systems of Aboriginal courts. The Nunga Court operates within a magistrates court, but provides the option of a sentencing conference, using less formal procedures and with input from the community, to create a more culturally appropriate method of deciding on a sentence. Referrals to other services may be included as part of rehabilitation for the offender.

== History ==
Awareness had grown through the 1990s, since the Royal Commission into Aboriginal Deaths in Custody in 1991, that the court system was failing Aboriginal people throughout Australia, and that disadvantage had caused high rates of Indigenous incarceration.

The first Nunga Court, the oldest such court in Australia, commenced operation as a pilot specialist court at Port Adelaide on 1 June 1999, initiated by magistrate Chris Vass. He was a member of the judicial Aboriginal Cultural Awareness Program, and regional manager of the Port Adelaide Magistrates Court and associated circuit courts, including those operating in the Anangu Pitjantjatjara Yankunytjatjara (APY Lands). After years of discussions with Aboriginal individuals and community groups, state government agencies, the Aboriginal Legal Rights Movement, police prosecutors, and solicitors, it was clear to Vass that Aboriginal people mistrusted the justice system, and found it difficult to understand, so he designed the pilot specialist court. Nunga is a local word for Aboriginal people, which later became part of the official name.

There was no funding to begin with but in 1999 funding was provided for two Aboriginal Justice Officers (AJOs). Further courts were established at Murray Bridge in 2001; at Port Augusta ("Special Aboriginal Court" in July 2001, and "Youth Aboriginal Court" in May 2003); and at Ceduna in July 2003 ("Aboriginal Court").

The former legislation governing the procedure, the Criminal Law (Sentencing) Act 1988 (SA), was amended in 2005 to provide legislative support to the already existing practice of Aboriginal Court Day in magistrates courts. The Sentencing Act 2017 which superseded the earlier law included the provisions.

The South Australian model influenced the establishment of Aboriginal courts in other states, such as the Koori Court in Shepparton, Victoria and the Murri Court in Brisbane, Queensland.

== Background ==
The aim of a Nunga Court is to help bridge cultural barriers and aid Aboriginal defendants' understanding of the law, court practice and procedure when they have committed an offence. Relationships may be built between the court and Aboriginal communities, which helps to reduce offending, and provide better outcomes for the defendants, by referring them to suitable medical, mental health and other rehabilitation services.

It aims to achieve better outcomes than conventional courts, but operates within the existing framework. According to a 2004 Information Bulletin by South Australia's Office of Crime Statistics and Research, the aims of an Aboriginal court include, among others:

- To provide a more culturally appropriate setting than mainstream courts
- To reduce the number of Aboriginal deaths in custody
- To improve court participation rates of Aboriginal people
- To break the cycle of Aboriginal offending
- To involve victims and the community as far as possible in the ownership of the court process

== Operation ==
"Aboriginal Court Day", aka the Nunga Court or the Aboriginal Sentencing Court, is available at the magistrates courts at Port Adelaide, Murray Bridge, Port Augusta, Mount Gambier, Port Lincoln and Ceduna.

The Sentencing Act 2017 (SA) includes provision for an optional sentencing conference for Aboriginal and Torres Strait Islander people, which is assisted by an Aboriginal and Torres Strait Islander Justice Officer (Aboriginal Justice Officer), who also determines their eligibility. In Section 22, the Act outlines the provisions:

Before sentencing an Aboriginal or Torres Strait Islander defendant, the court may, with the defendant's consent, and with the assistance of an Aboriginal and Torres Strait Islander Justice Officer—
(a) convene a sentencing conference; and

(b) take into consideration views expressed at the conference...

In the Nunga Courts, a magistrate is advised or helped by an Aboriginal Elder or Aboriginal Justice Officer. In this court, the prosecution firstly outlines the case against the defendant, who then has a chance to speak and then members of the Indigenous community may also speak. The elders have no authority delegated by the court but may advise on sentencing options, to ensure they are culturally appropriate.

The Nunga Court incorporates participation by people from the Aboriginal community in the court process, in particular Elders or other respected people from the community, in the sentencing process. Like other Aboriginal courts, Nunga Court is a sentencing court, that only deals with defendants who plead guilty, and is generally restricted to only Aboriginal and Torres Strait Islander people (with a few exceptions). Criminal law is upheld in the courts, not Aboriginal Australian customary law. Participation is optional for eligible persons.

In a sentencing conference, all participants, who may include family and community members as well as victims, sit on the same level. Elders, Respected Persons, and AJOs provide the magistrate with relevant advice regarding cultural or community issues. (In this context, Elders are aged 60+ years, and Respected Persons 40–60 years old.

== Community courts ==
The Nunga Courts are different from the Community Courts at the Adelaide and Elizabeth Magistrates Courts, where treatment programs are included in an Aboriginal sentencing process. The Aboriginal Community Courts provide for Aboriginal defendants to undertake an intervention program as an alternative to detention, especially for those Aboriginal defendants with mental health or substance abuse issues. As of July 2022 there are two such community courts:

- Aboriginal Community Court Elizabeth (ACCE), established April 2017
- Aboriginal Community Court Adelaide (ACCA), established August 2019

Both courts meet monthly, with Elders present, and defendants, who are supported by a caseworker, must agree to engage in treatment to address the issues that have brought them into conflict with the legal system.

== Other ==
The Courts Administration Authority employs other measures to help make the courts more culturally appropriate for Indigenous people. There are six Aboriginal Justice Officers and two Youth Aboriginal Justice Officers who work at a number of locations and courts, and Aboriginal Sentencing Conferences are available in all criminal jurisdictions in the state.

== See also ==
- Aboriginal Community Court in Western Australia (2006–2015)
- Community court (Northern Territory) (2005–2012)
- Koori Court in Victoria (2002–present)
- Murri Court in Queensland (2002–2012, 2016–present)
- Youth Koori Court in New South Wales (2015–present)
