= Diversion program =

Criminal justice system

A diversion program, also known as a pretrial diversion program or pretrial intervention program, in the criminal justice system is a form of pretrial sentencing that aims to remedy the behavior leading to the arrest. Administered by the judicial or law enforcement systems, they often allow the offender to avoid conviction and include a rehabilitation program intended to prevent future criminal acts. Availability and operations of such systems differ in different countries.

== Operation and functions ==
A criminal justice diversion program deals mainly with first-time offenders, allowing them to avoid a criminal record by undertaking certain actions to benefit the offender, their victims, and the wider community.

When a criminal offender joins a rehabilitation program to help remedy the behavior leading to the original arrest, it allows the offender to avoid conviction and, in some jurisdictions, avoid a criminal record. The programs are often run by a police department, court, district attorney's office, or outside agency. Problem-solving courts typically include a diversion component as part of their program. The purposes of diversion are generally thought to include relief to the courts, police department, and probation office, better outcomes compared to the direct involvement of the court system, and an opportunity for the offender to avoid prosecution by completing various requirements for the program. These requirements may include:

- Education aimed at preventing future offenses by the offender
- Restitution to victims of the offense
- Completion of community service hours
- Avoiding situations for a specified period in the future that may lead to committing another such offense (such as contact with certain people)

Diversion programs often frame these requirements as an alternative to court or police involvement or, if these institutions are already involved, further prosecution. Successful completion of program requirements often leads to a dismissal or reduction of the charges, while failure may bring back or heighten the penalties involved. Charges dismissed because of a diversion program will still lead to additional criminal history points under the US Sentencing Guidelines if there was a finding of guilt by a court or the defendant pleaded guilty or otherwise admitted guilt in open court, provided that the deferred disposition or deferred adjudication was not a juvenile matter.

== Diversion and juvenile justice ==
Juvenile diversion is based on the theory that processing certain youth through the juvenile justice system may do more harm than good. Programs meant to divert juvenile delinquents are often fundamentally different from the programs intended for adults. Many times, youth will present with substance abuse and mental health issues, which may be the underlying causes of such delinquency.

A juvenile diversion program can be used as an intervention strategy for first-time offenders who have broken the law and found themselves in the juvenile justice system ("Juvenile Diversion Programs"). There are many benefits to this program, including avoiding the child from being influenced by more severe criminals in a juvenile detention center; allowing the courts to use resources that are needed for those juvenile delinquents who are an actual threat to society; and getting the child help with drug addiction or family issues.

== By country ==
=== Australia ===
Australia has a federal system of government, in which the various states and territories have separate law enforcement agencies and judicial systems. There have been court diversionary programs in operation since the late 20th century. They take different forms, and in the 21st century, they usually take the form of adjourning a criminal case by a magistrates court. At the same time, a defendant undertakes a rehabilitation program, often for substance abuse. Some programs may be undertaken before or after the determination of guilt, while others are only available after conviction and before sentencing. They are usually only available for people with little prior contact with the justice system and for minor offenses.

Programs include those for people with disabilities or special needs; sex workers; homeless people; or Indigenous Australians. Diversionary programs for Aboriginal and Torres Strait Islander people are operated by Koori Court in Victoria; Youth Koori Court in New South Wales; Aboriginal Community Court in Western Australia; and, from 2002 to 2012, Murri Court in Queensland.

=== Georgia ===
In the country of Georgia, diversion programs give a first-time offender juvenile a chance to avoid a criminal record and conviction in exchange for a commitment to comply with a specific set of requirements. The purpose of the obligatory activities is to positively influence the offender and help them become a better citizen of society.

A juvenile diversion and mediation program was initiated in 2010 as a pilot project to be implemented in four cities: Tbilisi, Rustavi, Batumi, and Kutaisi. As Andro Gigauri, a high official at the Ministry of Justice of Georgia and the author of the program, anticipated, in 2011, the diversion and mediation program expanded with the adoption of the amendments to the Criminal Procedure Code of Georgia. Since 2013, the diversion program applies to all first-time offenders (without geographical limitations) who commit a non-violent crime, in cases where the alleged offender is up to 21 years old. Since 2015, the juvenile diversion and mediation program is also regulated under the Juvenile Justice Code of Georgia.

Between 2010 and 2019, more than 4,000 juveniles benefited from the diversion and mediation program in Georgia, and only nine committed a repeated crime.

The prosecuting attorney makes the decision on juvenile diversion. A social worker is then assigned to the case to assess the biopsychosocial profile of the juvenile. At the end of the assessment, the social worker recommends a set of requirements to be included in a diversion contract. The mediation process begins with the victim's consent. A neutral and independent mediator is assigned to the case. The mediator's tasks are: facilitating dialogue between the offender and the victim; helping with the reconciliation process; and reaching an agreement on damage restitution.

=== United Kingdom ===
Diversion can ensure that people with mental health problems who enter (or are at risk of entering) the criminal justice system are identified and provided with appropriate mental health services, treatment, and any other support they need. In the UK, the Centre for Mental Health has shown that such diversion represents good value for money, with well-designed interventions helping to reduce re-offending by a third. The need for joined-up services was the focus of a Centre for Mental Health lecture in 2011, in which NHS Confederation chairman Sir Keith Pearson emphasized the need to use custody more effectively and divert those who need it into treatment.

In February 2012, the UK government pledged to roll out a national liaison and diversion service by 2014, with 101 sites duly announced by the Department of Health. Diversion has also been found to be a key element of a more practical approach for young adults in the criminal justice process. A two-year UK pilot organized by the Centre for Mental Health, with support and funding from the Department of Health and the Youth Justice Board, looked into how to ensure that children and young people with mental health and other problems get the help they need as soon as they enter the youth justice system.

=== United States ===
The availability of diversion programs depends on the jurisdiction, the nature of the crime (usually non-violent offenses), and, in many cases, the exercise of prosecutorial discretion. A 2016 New York Times investigation revealed that some prosecutors charged substantial fees for and received significant revenue from diversion programs. Those fees can operate as a barrier to impecunious defendants accessing diversion. Pleading guilty is sometimes a prerequisite to accessing a diversion program. This means that if a defendant proceeds to a diversion program and then fails to pay the fee for the program, the defendant can be brought back to court and proceed directly to sentencing on a criminal conviction.

Many defendants are unable to complete diversion requirements, which usually include appearing for regular appointments and passing drug tests in addition to paying fees. People who have substance use disorders or other mental disorders and who are very poor often struggle to meet requirements and are much less likely to complete programs successfully. When they are sent back to court, they often face penalties that are more severe than those they would have received if they had not entered diversion in the first place.

Some jurisdictions in the United States may provide diversion programs for drunk driving charges. One such program is the Victim Impact Panel (VIP), administered by Mothers Against Drunk Driving (MADD) since 1982. MADD typically charges a $25 "donation" (which is defined as voluntary), even for court-mandated attendance; MADD reported $2,657,293 one year for such donations on its nonprofit tax-exempt returns.

In Florida, several counties offer a diversion program for veterans of the U.S. Armed Forces. Those who qualify and complete the program will have the criminal charge dismissed and can get the case expunged from their record.

== See also ==
- Conviction rate
- Deferred prosecution
- Nolle prosequi
- Plea bargain
- Recidivism
- Youth intervention
- Victims' rights
