= Trial by Treatment =

2025 book by Mary Ellen Stitt

Trial by Treatment: Punishing Illness in an Age of Criminal Legal Reform
- Cover of the 2025 Univ of Chicago+ORM edition
- Authors: Mary Ellen Stitt
- Language: English
- Subjects: Sociology
- Publisher: University of Chicago Press
- Publication date: 2025
- Publication place: USA
- Media type: Print (hardcover, Paperback)
- Pages: 256
- Awards: ASA Medical Sociology Section Donald W. Light Book Award for Applied or Public Practice of Medical Sociology (2026)
- ISBN: 978-0-226-84040-6

Trial by Treatment: Punishing Illness in an Age of Criminal Legal Reform is a 2025 book by the sociologist Mary Ellen Stitt published by University of Chicago Press. The book addresses pretrial diversion programs through ethnography and interviews. The book received the American Sociological Association Section on Medical Sociology's 2026 Donald W. Light Award for Applied or Public Practice of Medical Sociology.

== Description ==
Trial by Treatment is a study of pretrial diversion programs, through these programs prosecutors agree to drop charges against a criminal defendent if they successfully complete a mental health treatment program. Stitt works from interviews with people who have participated in diversion programs, in addition to mental health professionals, legal professionals, and judges. Through the book, Stitt argues that these programs reproduce carceral logics. Through the book, Stitt makes the case for the concept of "institutional entrenchment", or the process through which reforms can come to reinforce established patterns of action, through the mechanisms of legitimation, assimilation, and obfuscation.

== Reception ==
John M. Halushka, reviewing the book in the journal Theoretical Criminology, wrote that Stitt "shatters many of the myths around" pretrial diversion programs. Halushka wrote that Stitt's book "provides important lessons for opponents of mass incarceration" and shows that "reformers need to be careful with what they label as ‘best practices’". In a critical comment, Halushka said that he "would have liked to have seen a deeper discussion of the ethical trade-offs of extraction" in the book.

Maggie Wang, in a review published in Social & Legal Studies, described the book as "a valuable contribution to the literatures on street-level bureaucracy and the criminal legal system". Wang praised the book for doing "important work in identifying broader patterns in the functioning of bureaucratic institutions". Wang wrote that Trial by Treatment "offers a lucid critique of "reform from within"".

=== Awards ===
- ASA Section on Medical Sociology Donald W. Light Award for Applied or Public Practice of Medical Sociology (2026).
