= Koori Court =

Court for Aboriginal people in Victoria, Australia

A Koori Court is a separate division of the Magistrates', County and Children's Courts of Victoria, Australia. The Koori Court (Magistrates), Children's Koori Court, and County Koori Court hear selected cases, where Indigenous Australians have identified as such and requested the case be transferred to it. The first Koori Court was established in Shepparton in 2002. Koori Court aims to reduce recidivism by involving Elders, other respected persons in the Aboriginal community, and court advisors to provide information about the background of the defendant, and to advise on culturally appropriate sentences.

Koori Court is the only Indigenous sentencing court in an indictable jurisdiction in Australia.

== Background and history ==
The word Koori refers to Aboriginal Australians from south-east Australia, in the regions now encompassing the State of Victoria as well as southern New South Wales.

The Koori Courts were an initiative of the Victorian Aboriginal Justice Agreement (VAJA), a joint partnership strategy between the Victorian Government and the Victorian Koori community developed to reduce Indigenous over-representation in the criminal justice system and to improve justice outcomes for Aboriginal Victorians. The VAJA was established by the Victorian Government based on the recommendations of the Royal Commission into Aboriginal Deaths in Custody in 1991. The courts are modelled on the South Australian Nunga Court, first established in 1999 at Port Adelaide. Koori Courts were created in order to allow participation of the Aboriginal community and culture in the Australian legal system, in an attempt to bridge the differences between Indigenous customary law and Australia's common law system.

They began operation in 2002, under the Koori Court Division created by the Magistrates' Court (Koori Court) Act 2002 (Vic), with the first one established in Shepparton in October 2002, and the second at Broadmeadows in 2003.

The Children and Young Persons (Koori Court) Act 2004 established the Children's Koori Court for young offenders in 2005, and the County Court Amendment (Koori Court) Act 2008 established the pilot for the County Koori Court in early 2009. The County Court is the principal trial court in Victoria, and deals with more serious offences than the Magistrates Court.

== Operation ==
The Magistrates' Court Act states that the objective of the Division is "ensuring greater participation of the Aboriginal community in the sentencing process of the Magistrates' Court through the role to be played in that process by the Aboriginal Elder or respected person and others". Other provisions of the court are covered by the Sentencing Act 1991, and all conventional sentences may be applied, including going to prison. The Koori Court is separate division of the Magistrates' Court of Victoria, the County Court of Victoria and the Children's Court of Victoria.

The court sessions are held on a designated day in an ordinary courthouse. The laws administered are exactly the same as in any Australian courthouse, but the Koori Courts cannot deal with family violence or sexual offences, and the format of the hearings are different.

In Koori Court, the magistrate or judge sits at a table, called the bar table, with the offender, solicitors, community Elders, a Koori Court officer, the prosecutor, community correction officer, and family members of the offender. Legalese is not allowed; proceedings are less formal than mainstream courts, and spoken in plain English. Prosecutors have personal conversations with the defendant about their circumstances, in order to arrive at the most suitable and culturally appropriate sentence. The Elder or other respected members of the community may advise the magistrate on a culturally appropriate sentence, and/or one which is likely to reduce the likelihood of reoffending.

Koori Court is the only Indigenous sentencing court in an indictable jurisdiction in Australia.

== Impact ==
After a two-year pilot scheme, Koori Courts were successful in reducing recidivism, with a recidivism rate in the Shepparton Koori Court of 12.5% and a rate in the Broadmeadows Koori Court of 15.5%, compared to a general rate of 29.41%. They have also being successful in strengthening the role of community elders and family structures.

== Locations ==
As of July 2022 there are Koori Courts in:

- Bairnsdale
- Broadmeadows
- Dandenong
- Geelong
- Hamilton
- Heidelberg
- Latrobe Valley (Morwell)
- Melbourne
- Mildura
- Portland
- Shepparton
- Swan Hill
- Warrnambool

== See also ==
- Aboriginal Community Court in Western Australia (2006–2015)
- Community court (Northern Territory) (2005–2012)
- Indigenous court (disambiguation)
- Murri Court in Queensland (2002-2012, 2016–present)
- Nunga Court in South Australia (1999-present)
- Youth Koori Court in New South Wales (2002-present)
