= Koori =

Demonym for some Aboriginal Australians

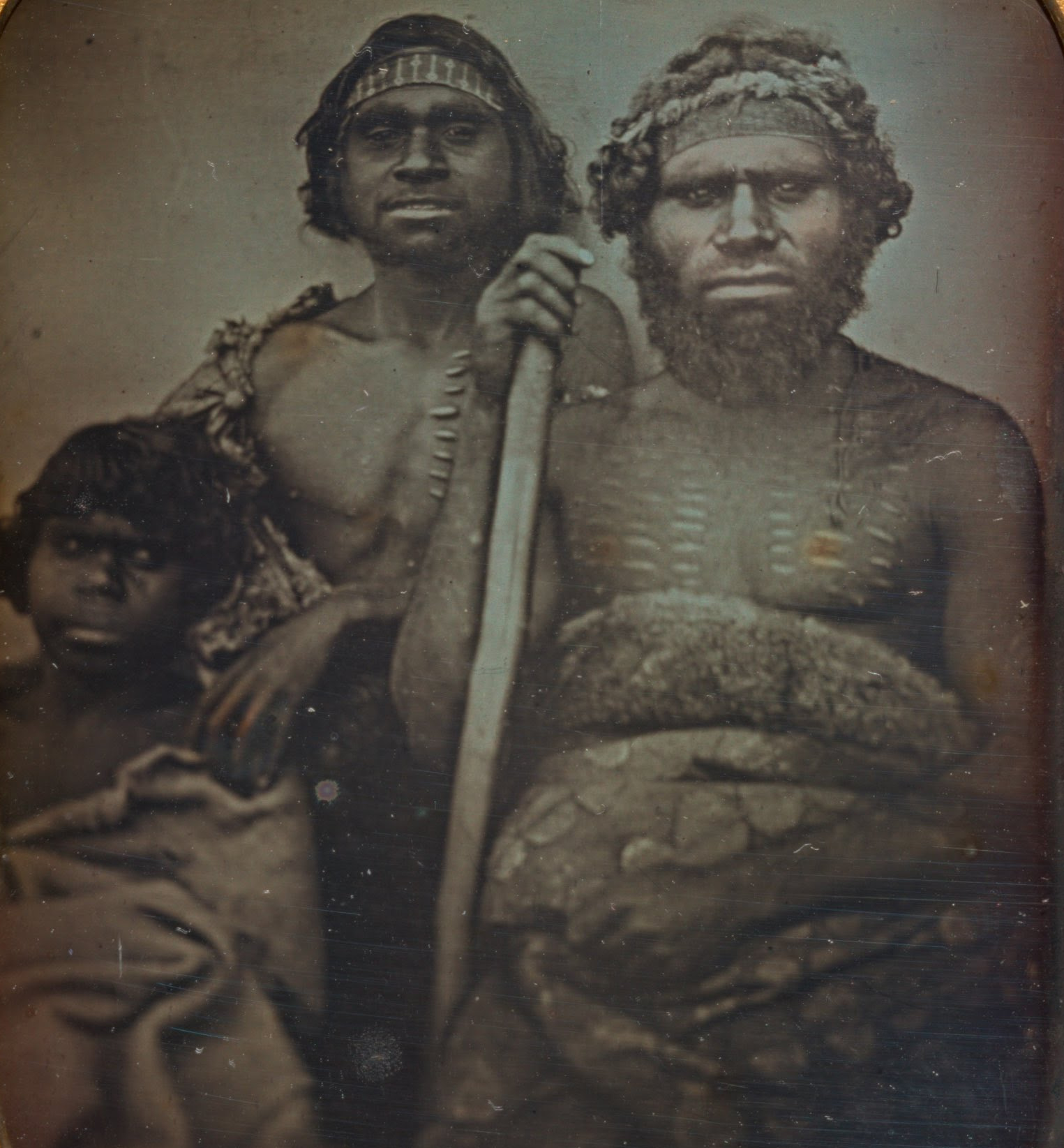
- Daguerreotype photograph, c. 1847, described as "Group of Koorie men" by the National Gallery of Victoria

Total population
- 323,452 (2016 census)

Regions with significant populations
- New South Wales: 265,685
- Victoria: 57,767

Languages
- English (Australian English, Australian Aboriginal English, Koori English), Australian Aboriginal languages

Related ethnic groups
- Aboriginal Australians, Anangu, Arrernte, Murri, Noongar, Palawa

Koori (also spelt koorie, goori or goorie) is a demonym for Aboriginal Australians from a region that approximately corresponds to southern New South Wales and Victoria. The word derives from the Indigenous language Awabakal. For some people and groups, it has been described as a reclaiming of Indigenous language and culture, as opposed to relying on European titles such as "Aboriginal". The term is also used with reference to institutions involving Koori communities and individuals, such as the Koori Court, Koori Radio and Koori Knockout.

The Koori region is home to the largest proportion of Australia's Indigenous population (Aboriginal and Torres Strait Islander people), with 40.7% of Indigenous Australians living in either New South Wales or Victoria. Within the region however, Koori-identifying people make up only 2.9% and 0.8% of the overall populations of New South Wales and Victoria respectively. Most of this Koori population speak English in the home, although a small number do report continued usage of traditional Indigenous languages.

Koori culture is characterised by a commitment to the Dreaming, an overall worldview that believes in and values interconnectedness between the land and community. Koori art and literature continue to be produced in contemporary Australia, often with reference to traditional Indigenous artistic techniques.

The first recorded meeting between Koori people and Europeans occurred in 1770. Kooris have since experienced a sharp population decline, influenced by the colonisation of Australia by Europeans. The legacy of colonisation is still strongly felt, and has had ongoing ramifications for Koori life and wellbeing.

== Etymology ==
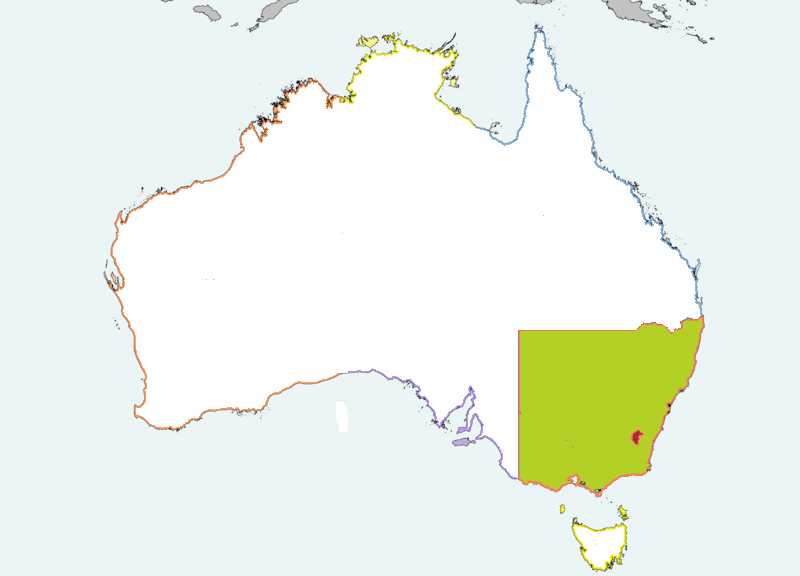
The Koori region

"Koori" comes from the word gurri, meaning "man" or "people" in the Indigenous language Awabakal, spoken on the mid-north coast of New South Wales. On the far north coast of New South Wales, the term may still be spelt "goori" or "goorie" and pronounced with a harder "g". The term's first documented usage occurred in 1834 in An Australian Grammar as "Ko-re", translated to mean man or mankind.

== Geography and subgroups ==
Koori Indigenous Australians inhabit the broad region of southern New South Wales and Victoria. Indigenous subgroups within this region are numerous, including the Eora nation of modern-day Sydney, Ngunnawal nation of Canberra and Woiwurrung nation of Melbourne.

== Knowledge and culture ==
=== Art ===
Like archetypal Indigenous painting, Koori painting is based largely on dot work, done in "earthy colours" such as blacks, whites, reds and browns. Some Koori elders identify this style as a means of reconnecting with traditional Indigenous culture and ancestry.

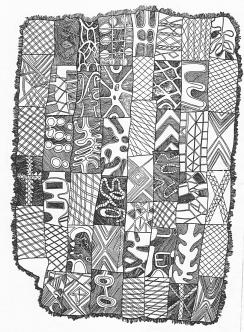
Possum-skin cloak of Wurundgeri origin

More unique to the Koori population is the prevalence of artistic "shell craft", using shells found in the coastal environment to decorate ornamental pieces. Documents from the 1880s detail Koori women selling shell craft baskets and decorative shoes to settler women at markets in La Perouse and Circular Quay, a practice that appears unique to the Sydney area.

Shell craft has continued to be of importance to the modern Koori population, with a 2008 exhibit at the Museum of Contemporary Art in Sydney incorporating Indigenous shell craft. In 2005, Koori shell artist Esme Timbery won the Parliament of New South Wales Indigenous Art Prize for her shell-adorned model of the Sydney Harbour Bridge. The economic prevalence of Koori shell craft, too, has increased in contemporary Indigenous art history. While in 2005, shell craft shoes retailed for approximately A$20, a pair sold for A$140 at a Sydney gallery in 2009.

Also unique to the Koori region were possum-skin cloaks, traditionally gifted to Koori newborns. The cloaks were embellished with the markings of the newborn's clan and family, and were added to as the child grew, to represent a kind of Koori "autobiography". Although the craft of possum-skin cloaks has declined, it is being revived by contemporary Koori artists such as Kelly Koumalatsos.

=== Language ===
The Koori region is home to a number of traditional Indigenous languages. The state of Victoria has speakers of 38 Aboriginal languages, while New South Wales has historically been home to more than 70. However, the number of Kooris who report speaking an Indigenous language at home is low. Only 0.8% of New South Wales and 1% of Victorian Kooris speak an Indigenous language in the home, being the lowest rates of Indigenous language usage outside of Tasmania.

There are some attempts to revive Koori languages. In New South Wales, the number of Koori families speaking an Indigenous language at home is on the rise. Census data indicates that the number of New South Wales Indigenous language speakers increased by 123% between 2006 and 2016. The New South Wales Government's Aboriginal Languages Act was enacted in 2017 in an attempt to preserve Indigenous languages.

In addition to traditional languages, Kooris may also speak "Koori English", the dialect of English spoken by Kooris within their communities. The dialect developed from the pidgin English used by Kooris to communicate with settlers at the time of colonisation. It employs nonverbal language cues such as silences, gestures and lip pursing. Some grammatical elements of Koori English may persist from traditional Indigenous languages, such as distinct ways of marking plural nouns.

=== Birthing rituals ===
Historical records show Koori birthing rituals involving song, dance and ceremonial practices. Gunditjmara Kooris of south west Victoria record the ritualistic use of sand, heated by fire both to warm the infant and welcome it to country. Records also exist detailing Koori use of medical techniques such as natural pain management, and the teaching of these techniques to European settler women.

Historically, "birthing trees" were essential to Koori birthing rituals. These were trees used as the sites of births, where mothers, families and communities could congregate to deliver the baby and welcome it to country. Sometimes, the placenta would be buried under the birthing tree to symbolise the newborn's connection to country. A Koori birthing tree in Western Victoria has received status as a significant tree on the Australian Register of the National Trust in recognition of its importance to the Koori population.

== History ==
=== Before European colonisation ===
Radiocarbon dating has identified evidence of Indigenous inhabitancy in the Koori region as early as 50,000–45,000 years ago. Ancient Koori artefacts including human remains and tools have been found at Lake Mungo in New South Wales, dated to be between 50,000 and 46,000 years old.

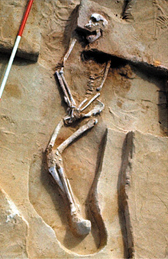
Ancient human remains discovered at Lake Mungo, New South Wales

In Western Victoria, structures from ancient Koori populations have been discovered, including stone-walled fishing traps measuring up to six metres in height and three kilometres in length. The traps date to approximately 6,600 years old, making them one of the world's oldest known fish-trapping system. Similarly aged "village" sites have been found in South-Eastern Victoria, featuring wooden structures, garden areas and agricultural wetlands.

In New South Wales, small tools used for processing plants and hunting have been discovered to be approximately 10,000 years old. Fishhooks appear to have been widely used across the Koori coastline as early as 1000 years ago. These fishhooks appear to originate from outside of Australia, possibly from the Torres Strait or Polynesia, indicating a system of regional trade.

=== Early contact ===
The first documented contact between Indigenous Australians and Europeans on Koori territory occurred in 1770 during James Cook's HMS Endeavour expedition. In his journals, Cook documents interactions with Indigenous groups at Botany Bay near modern-day Sydney. During this initial contact, two Indigenous men resisted Cook's landing, causing Cook to open fire and wound one of the men. Endeavour remained docked in the bay for the subsequent seven days, meaning that interactions between the explorers and Indigenous Kooris were conducted from a distance.

Koori material culture was observed, such as the use of watercraft, weaponry and tools, but there was little European documentation of Koori religious and cultural life during this voyage. The Indigenous groups of Botany Bay did not accept Cook's trade offerings and resisted farther encroachment of the explorers onto Koori territory.

=== European colonisation and population decline ===
Following this initial contact, Great Britain established a penal colony at Botany Bay in New South Wales. The first settlers of this colony arrived in 1788 aboard the First Fleet, beginning the official colonisation of Australia by Europeans.

Over the century following colonisation, there occurred a steep decline in the Aboriginal population. Approximations of overall Indigenous population decline range from 80 to 96%, with estimates of around 80% in the Koori region in the first 20 years of contact.

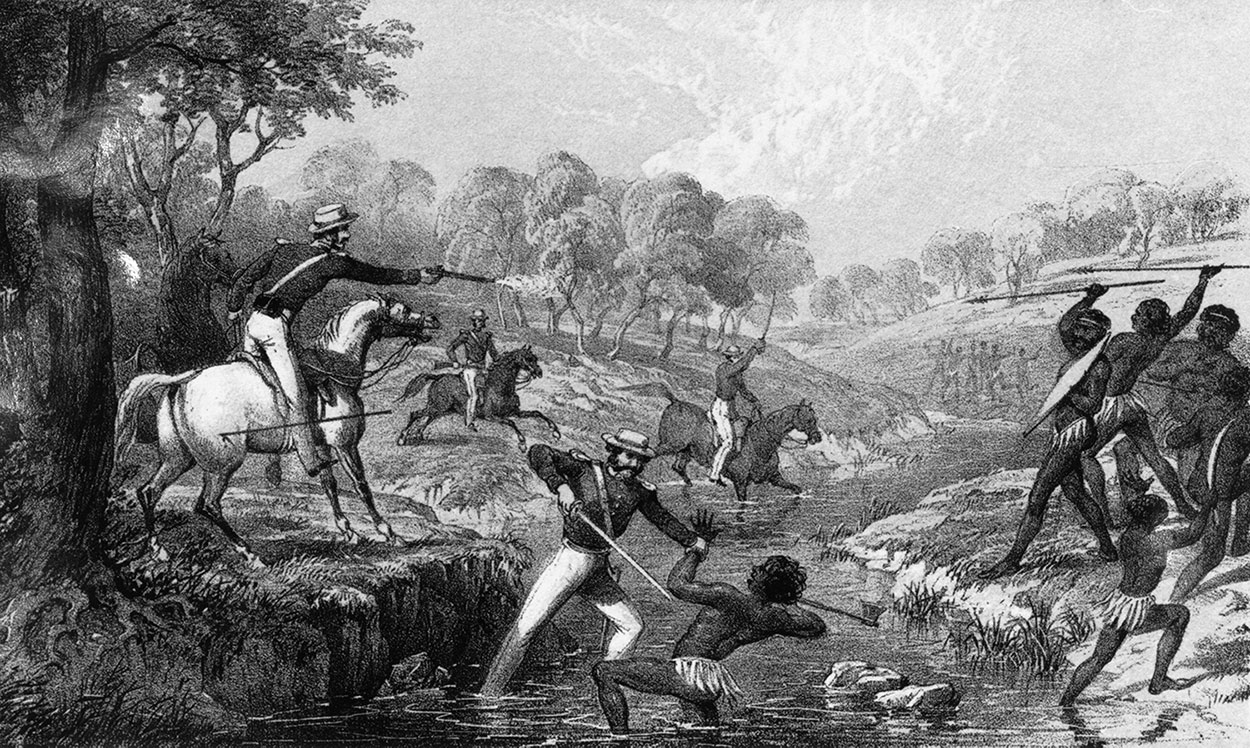
Waterloo Creek massacre

Generally accepted estimates approximate that 2000 non-Aboriginals (mostly Europeans) and 20,000 Aboriginals were killed in armed conflict between the two groups. This included the Waterloo Creek massacre on New South Wales Koori territory in 1837, during which an estimated 200–300 Kooris were killed. In the 1830s and 1840s, the Western District of Victoria was recorded as one of the two worst regions for violence. Sexual violence also occurred, particularly towards Koori women and children, sometimes resulting in death or infertility.

Many Kooris also died from epidemics of European diseases to which they had no tolerance. In 1791, all but two of the Koori inhabitants of inner Sydney died of smallpox or chickenpox. Another smallpox epidemic affected the New South Wales and Victoria regions in 1830. Deaths also occurred due to sexually transmitted infections, transported to Australia by the settlers. In Port Phillip, Victoria, two-thirds of the Koori population died of sexually transmitted infections.

=== 20th century ===
The Aborigines Protection Board of New South Wales and Victoria enabled the segregation of Kooris onto government-run missions and reserves. In the 1910s, the Board's powers were extended to allow for the removal of Koori children from their families for assimilation into the non-Indigenous population. Some Koori children were placed into white families, while others were sent to labour schools such as the Cootamundra Domestic Training Home for Aboriginal Girls and Kinchela Aboriginal Boys' Training Home. This process of segregation and child-removal was common throughout Australia and became known as the Stolen Generations.

In 1937, New South Wales Koori activist William Ferguson founded the Aborigines Progressive Association in Sydney to protest the oppression of the Aborigines Protection Board. Approximately 1000 Indigenous Australians attended the organisation's first rally in Sydney on 26 January 1938.

From the 1970s, the policies of segregation and assimilation began to shift. New South Wales adopted the Aboriginal Child Placement Principle in 1987, mandating that an Indigenous family be chosen for the rehoming of Koori children wherever possible. In 1997, the premiers of both New South Wales and Victoria apologised for the historic mistreatment of Indigenous Australians, including an apology for the Stolen Generation, and affirmed their commitment to reconciliation.

== Current issues ==
Statistics indicate ongoing divergences between Koori and non-Koori Australians in areas such as health, education, income levels, and incarceration rates. The Australian National University's Centre for Aboriginal Economic Policy Research ties these statistical divergences to the Indigenous experience of colonialism.

=== Health ===
Statistics show that Koori Australians have poorer health than their non-Koori counterparts, reflected in their lower life expectancy. Across New South Wales and Victoria, non-Koori individuals were expected to live 8–10 years longer than Koori individuals between 2015 and 2017. Thus, the Koori population is younger in demographic, with the median age of the New South Wales Koori community being 22, in contrast to 38 for the non-Koori population.

In New South Wales, 7.6% of the Indigenous population are profoundly or severely disabled, compared to 5.6% of non-Indigenous individuals, and this gap is widening. Additionally, New South Wales Kooris with a disability tend to be younger: 36% of the Indigenous disabled population in New South Wales is under 25, compared to 12.7% of the non-Indigenous.

=== Education ===
Koori Australians also have lower levels of education than their non-Koori counterparts. In New South Wales, Koori children are half as likely to have completed secondary school. In Victoria, only 56.5% of Koori 25–34 year olds have some form of tertiary education, compared to 74.9% of non-Koori individuals.

=== Income ===
Koori Australians are more likely to be living below or near the poverty line. Approximately 32.4% of Koori households in New South Wales earn below A$500/week, compared to 22.3% of non-Indigenous. Less than half of New South Wales Kooris own their homes, compared to 70% of non-Koori residents.

New South Wales Kooris are less likely to be in the labour force, with an underemployment rate of 43% compared to 35.9% of non-Koori residents. The professional services industry has the highest divergence, with non-Koori employees three times as likely to work in this sector.

=== Incarceration rates ===
Koori Australians are more likely to be incarcerated in both New South Wales and Victoria. In 2019, Koori adults were 9.3 times more likely to be incarcerated in New South Wales than their non-Koori counterparts. In Victoria, they were 14.5 times more likely.

These statistics are mirrored in youth detention. In New South Wales, Koori children aged 10–17 were sixteen times more likely to be in detention on an average day in 2018 and 2019. In Victoria, they were 10 times as likely.

=== Government initiatives ===
New South Wales and Victoria have both introduced initiatives to address these divergences between Koori and non-Koori individuals. In March 2019, both states established a formal partnership with the Australian Federal Government to address the goals of the Closing the Gap initiative. The partnership also includes representatives from Indigenous activist groups.

== Koori Courts ==
A Koori Court is a division of the Magistrates' Court of Victoria that sentences Indigenous Australians who plead guilty, operational since 2002.

New South Wales has several Youth Koori Courts, the first of which was established in Parramatta in 2015.

== Koori Radio ==
Koori Radio, a community radio-station based in Redfern, broadcasts to Sydney on a citywide licence. It forms part of the Gadigal Information Service and is the only radio station in Sydney providing full-time broadcasting to the Aboriginal and Torres Strait Islander community.

== Koori Mail ==
Koori Mail is a national Indigenous newspaper based in Lismore, New South Wales.

== Koori Knockout ==
The NSW Koori Rugby League Knockout is one of the largest gatherings of Indigenous people in Australia. A modern-day corroboree for the Koori people of NSW, it has been held annually over the October long weekend since 1971.

== Koorie Heritage Trust ==
The Koorie Heritage Trust in Melbourne holds over 100,000 artistic artefacts from Indigenous South-Eastern Australia. The Trust's collection includes prehistoric tools, 19th Century art by Koori artists William Barak and Tommy McRae, and pieces by contemporary Koori artists.

== Other names used by Australian Indigenous people ==
There are a number of other names from Australian Aboriginal languages commonly used to identify groups based on geography:

- Anangu in northern South Australia, and neighbouring parts of Western Australia and Northern Territory
- Pama in northern Queensland
- Murri in southern Queensland and northern New South Wales
- Nunga in southern South Australia
- Nyoongar in southern Western Australia
- Palawa (or Pakana) in Tasmania

== See also ==
- List of Australian Aboriginal group names
- Koori Bina, a 1970s monthly published by Black Women's Action
- The Koori History Website (Kooriweb)

== Sources ==
- "Aboriginal Language Map". Museums & Galleries of NSW.
- Adams, Karen; Faulkhead, Shannon; Standfield, Rachel; Atkinson, Petah (2018). "Challenging the colonisation of birth: Koori women's birthing knowledge and practice". Women and Birth. 31 (2): 81–88. doi:10.1016/j.wombi.2017.07.014. ISSN 1871-5192. PMID 28803884.
- "Adults are not overrepresented in the criminal justice system". Closing the Gap.
- Angus, Chris (2018). "Indigenous NSW: Findings from the 2016 Census" (PDF). NSW Parliamentary Research Service.
- "Bringing them home: 8. History - New South Wales and the Australian Capital Territory". Australian Human Rights Commission.
- "Cootamundra Aboriginal Girls' Home". New South Wales Office of Environment and Heritage.
- "Everyone enjoys long and healthy lives". Closing the Gap.
- Gardiner-Garden, John (29 June 1999). "From Dispossession to Reconciliation: Research Paper 27 1998–99". Department of the Parliamentary Library, Government of Australia.
- Harding, Janina (1993). "Koori". Children Australia. 18 (1): 19. doi:10.1017/s103507720000328x. ISSN 1035-0772. S2CID 242265716.
- Harris, John (2003). "Hiding the bodies: the myth of the humane colonisation of Aboriginal Australia". Aboriginal History. 27. doi:10.22459/ah.27.2011.07. ISSN 0314-8769.
- James, Stuart (2000). "Oxford English Dictionary Online". Reference Reviews. 14 (6): 20–22. doi:10.1108/rr.2000.14.6.20.288. ISSN 0950-4125.
- "Kelly Koumalatsos". Museums Victoria.
- "Kinchela Aboriginal Boys' Training Home". New South Wales Office of Environment and Heritage.
- Konishi, Shino; Nugent, Maria (5 November 2013). "Newcomers, c. 1600–1800". In Bashford, A.; Macintyre, S. (eds.). The Cambridge History of Australia. Cambridge University Press. pp. 43–67. doi:10.1017/cho9781107445758.005. ISBN 978-110744575-8.
- "Koorie Art and Artefacts". Culture Victoria.
- Larsen, Ann-Claire; Milnes, Peter (2011). "A cautionary note on therapeutic jurisprudence for Aboriginal offenders". ELaw Journal: Murdoch University Electronic Journal of Law. 18 (1): 1–27. Archived from the original on 27 February 2017.
- Nash, Daphne (2010). "From shell work to shell art: Koori women creating knowledge and value on the South Coast of NSW" (PDF). Craft + Design Enquiry. 2.
- Norman, Heidi (n.d.). "Koori Knockout". Sydney Barani. City of Sydney.
- "NSW Aboriginal Languages". Our Languages. 3 June 2010.
- "Partnership". Closing the Gap.
- Patten, John T (n.d.). "About Koori History - Aboriginal History & Culture". Koori History – Aboriginal History of South Eastern Australia.
- Ryan, Hannah (18 September 2018). "Aboriginal people will be able to access Koori Court more easily after a Supreme Court win". BuzzFeed.
- Saunders, Esme (2000). "Koori English: a legitimate dialect". Fine Print. 23. doi:10.1016/j.wombi.2017.07.014.
- Simmons, Lola; Miranda, Beverley; Morgan, Lorna; Gilmartin, Beverley; Johnson, Lillian; Woods, Victoria; Peronchik, Gloria; Fisher, Helen; Markna, Vicki; Foat, Margaret (2015). "Bankstown Koori Elders group on colour". Journal of Australian Ceramics. 54.
- "Students reach their full potential through further education pathways". Closing the Gap.
- Thackray, Lucy; Proust, Keira (20 July 2022). "Youth Koori Court launched in Dubbo to support young Indigenous offenders". ABC News.
- Veth, Peter; O'Connor, Sue (5 November 2013). "The past 50,000 years: an archaeological view". In Bashford, A.; Macintyre, S. (eds.). The Cambridge History of Australia. Cambridge University Press. pp. 17–42. doi:10.1017/cho9781107445758.004. ISBN 978-1-107-44575-8.
- "Victorian Aboriginal languages". Museums Victoria: Bunjilaka Aboriginal Culture Centre.
- Wahlquist, Calla (6 May 2018). "Indigenous elders urge expanded Koori courts to help cut juvenile detention time". The Guardian.
- "Young people are not overrepresented in the criminal justice system". Closing the Gap.
