= Children's Court of Queensland =

Specialized court in Queensland, Australia

- Established: 1992
- Jurisdiction: Queensland, Australia
- Composition method: Vice-regal appointment upon nomination by the Premier following the advice of the Attorney-General and Cabinet
- Authorised by: Queensland Parliament via the Childrens Court Act 1992 (QLD)
- Appeals to: District Court of Queensland
- Appeals from: Children's Court, a division of the Magistrates' Court of Queensland
- Judge term length: mandatory retirement by age of 70
- Website: www.courts.qld.gov.au

President
- Currently: Judge Michael Shanahan
- Since: 2011

The Children's Court of Queensland is a specialized court in Queensland, a state of Australia, which deals with serious crimes committed by children under 18 years old.

Decisions made by the Children's Court of Queensland may be heard on appeal to the District Court of Queensland; and the Children's Court of Queensland has appellate jurisdiction where for matters heard before a magistrate of the Children's Court.

The court should not be confused with the Children's Court which is a division of the Magistrates' Court of Queensland.

== Establishment ==
The court is established under the Children's Court Act 1992 (Qld). The court is a court of record and is an inferior court. The court came into existence in 1992.

== Composition ==
The court is constituted by either a single judge or a single magistrate depending on the nature of the crime allegedly committed. In most cases, the matters will be dealt with by either a children's court judge or children's court magistrate. However, if one is not available, then a district court judge or a magistrate may deal with the case even though they have not been appointed by the Governor of Queensland.

=== President of the Children's Court of Queensland ===
The Governor may appoint a president of the court. The president must be a children's court judge. The major functions of the president are to oversee the court and ensure that its work is carried out quickly and effectively. There is no deputy president of the court. However, the governor may appoint an acting president to act in the president's absence.

Order	Name	Date appointed	Term in office	Notes
1	Judge Fred McGuire AO (since deceased)	1992	5–6 years	
2	Judge John Mervyn Robertson	1999	3–4 years	
3	Judge Kerry John O'Brien	2002	3–4 years	
4	Judge Julie Maree Dick SC	2007	2–3 years	
5	Judge Michael Shanahan	2011	14–15 years	

=== Other members of the Court ===
The Governor may appoint a judge of the District Court of Queensland as a judge to the Children's Court. Judges are appointed based on their experience and interest in dealing with the children's court jurisdiction. The Governor may also appoint other district court judges to act as children's court judges.

The Governor may appoint a magistrate as a Children's Court magistrate. The governor may also appoint other stipendiary magistrates as acting children's court magistrates.

The following are appointed as Children's Court judges as at April 2015:

- John Robertson
- Clive Wall RFD QC
- Nicholas Samios
- Deborah Richards
- Sarah Bradley
- Michael John Shanahan
- Julie Dick SC
- Paul Smith
- Fleur Kingham
- William Everson
- Brian Devereaux SC
- Brad Farr SC
- Stuart Durward SC
- John Baluch SC

== Jurisdiction of Magistrates ==
A Children's Court magistrate has jurisdiction:

- to hear and determine all simple offences;
- to hear and determine most indictable offences if the child consents to it; and
- to conduct committal proceedings in relation to indictable offences.

A Children's Court magistrate also has powers to hear Child Protection matters pursuant to the Child Protection Act 1999.

== Who may attend ==
Generally children's court cases are held in a closed court, although criminal offences dealt with by indictment are held in open court. This is against the usual principle that all common law courts are open to public, and reflects that children are being dealt with inside the court. Cases are held at different times to any other case being heard by the court on the day.

At a hearing, the following people may attend

- the child;
- their parent or other adult member of the child's family;
- a witness giving evidence;
- a person whose presence will provide emotional support to a witness;
- certain welfare services; and
- any other person who the court believes should be present.

== Caseload ==
The Children's Court of Queensland as a whole (including Judges and Magistrates) dealt with 5,431 juveniles in 2005–06 compared with 6,996 in 2004–2005. This represents a 22.4% decrease in the number of defendants. There was a 9.8% decrease in the number of juveniles appearing before a Children's Court Judge. Furthermore, there was an overall decrease of 29.3% in the number of charges brought against juveniles in Queensland in 2005–2006, at 1,771, down from 16,656 in the previous year. According to its Annual Review, unlawful entry with intent and theft (and related offences) accounted for 44.1% of all charges. Children's Court Magistrates disposed of 93% of juvenile cases in 2005–2006.

== See also ==
- Australian court hierarchy
- Judiciary of Australia
- List of Queensland courts and tribunals
- Murri Court
