= Community court =

Neighborhood-focused problem-solving courts emphasizing relationships

In several countries including Australia, the United States, the United Kingdom, Canada, Israel and South Africa, a community court is a neighborhood-focused problem-solving court that applies a problem-solving approach to local crime and safety concerns. Community courts can take many forms, but all strive to create new relationships, both within the justice system and with outside stakeholders such as residents, merchants, churches and schools. Community courts emphasize collaboration, crime prevention, and improved outcomes, including lower recidivism and safer communities. Community courts are also sometimes referred to as community or neighborhood justice centers.

In Australia, a community court is the name given to Indigenous court proceedings conducted in the Magistrates Court of the Northern Territory.

== Principles ==
According to the Center for Court Innovation, community courts are animated by six key principles. They are:

- Restoring the community:
- Bridging the gap between communities and courts;
- Knitting together a fractured criminal justice system;
- Helping offenders deal with problems that lead to crime;
- Providing the courts with better information; and
- Building a physical courthouse that reflects these ambitions.

== Research ==
By the end of 2010, there had been at least 19 separate evaluations conducted of community courts in the U.S., including 11 impact studies, nine process evaluations, and three cost-benefit analyses. A 2012 evaluation of the District of Columbia Superior Court's East of the River Community Court found that the program brought down rates of re-offending among misdemeanor defendants.

== United States ==
=== Midtown Community Court ===
The first community court in the United States was the Midtown Community Court, launched in 1993 in New York City. The court, which serves the Times Square neighborhood of Manhattan, targets quality-of-life offenses, such as prostitution, illegal vending, graffiti, shoplifting, farebeating, and vandalism.

Operated as a public/private partnership among the New York State Unified Court System, New York City, and the Center for Court Innovation the court initially opened as a three-year demonstration project, designed to test the ability of criminal courts to forge closer links with the community and develop a collaborative problem-solving approach to quality-of-life offenses.

The Midtown Court experiment was born of a profound frustration with the conventional response to quality-of-life crime. Supporters of the initiative, which included justice system innovators, business leaders and neighborhood residents, felt that the justice system did not take community concerns seriously. They also felt that a court could use its leverage to more effectively address the causes and conditions that contribute to crime.

Court planners sited the new court in a renovated 1896 building. The building featured clean, bright holding rooms secured with glass panels rather than bars, a pointed contrast to the typical holding pens. The new courthouse also included a full floor of office space for social workers to assist offenders. And the building was wired for an innovative computer system that would allow the judge, attorneys and social service workers to keep in touch with each other and quickly access a defendant's full record.

Offenders at the Midtown Community Court are sentenced to pay back the community through work projects in the neighborhood—caring for street trees, getting rid of graffiti, cleaning subway stations and sorting recycled cans and bottles. At the same time, wherever possible, the court uses its legal leverage to link offenders with social services—drug treatment, health care, education—to help them address their problems. In these ways, the Midtown Community Court seeks to stem the chronic offending that demoralizes law-abiding residents.

Research conducted by the National Center for State Courts on the implementation and early effects of the Midtown Community Court over its first 18 months found that the project achieved its key operational objectives: to provide speedier justice; to make justice visible in the community where crimes take place; to encourage enforcement of low-level crime; to marshal the energy of local residents, organizations and businesses to collaborate on developing community service and social service projects; and to demonstrate that communities are victimized by quality-of-life offenses.

The researchers also credited the Midtown Court with changing conventional sentencing practices for low-level offenses, which were typically either sentences of "time served" (i.e., the time spent in jail between arrest and appearing in court) or short-term jail (a month or less). Sentencing at the Midtown Court produced significantly more intermediate sanctions than the city's conventional arraignment court. Intermediate sanctions included immediate assignment to community restitution projects (with offenders often beginning their sentences within 24 hours of their arraignments) to mandatory participation in social services, such as drug treatment or job training.

In addition, the researchers found "substantial evidence" that the Midtown Court contributed to improvements in quality-of-life conditions in Times Square and surrounding neighborhoods. Together, ethnographic observations of local crime and safety "hot spots," interviews with offenders, analysis of arrest data, focus group interviews and interviews with local police, community leaders and residents pointed to substantial reductions in concentrations of prostitution and unlicensed vending. Arrests for prostitution in the Midtown neighborhood dropped by 56 percent over the first 18 months and arrests for unlicensed vending fell by 24 percent, reflecting a visible reduction in criminal activity on the streets. Community members also reported a marked reduction in graffiti along Ninth Avenue, the commercial strip that serves the residential community.

By 1997, the Court was arraigning an average of 65 cases per day for an annual total of over 16,000 cases. This volume made the Midtown Court one of the busiest arraignment courts in the city. In addition, sentenced offenders were performing the equivalent of $175,000 worth of community restitution work per year. The Midtown Court's emphasis on immediacy—offenders must report to the Court's community service or social service center immediately after sentencing—also improved compliance rates. Nearly 75 percent complete their community restitution sentences as mandated, the highest rate in the city.

=== Replication of the community court model ===
Over 30 community courts, inspired by the model of the Midtown Community Court, are in operation or planning around the U.S. Although different in many ways, the various U.S. community courts all strive to create new relationships, both within the justice system and with outside stakeholders, such as residents, merchants, churches and schools. They also test new and aggressive approaches to public safety.

Community courts in the United States include: Downtown San Diego Community Court Project (opened in October 2002); Denver Community Court (opened in September 2003); Hartford Community Court (opened in November 1998); Waterbury (Connecticut) Community Court, opened in October 2000; Washington, D.C. – East of the River Community Court; Washington, D.C. – Traffic and Misdemeanor Community Court (opened in January 2002); West Palm Beach (Florida) Community Court, opened in August 1999; Westgate Community Justice Center in Palm Beach County, Florida (opened in May 2006); Atlanta Community Court (opened in March 2000); Indianapolis Community Court (opened in April 2001); Dakota County, Minnesota, Community Court (opened in October 2002); Minneapolis – Hennepin County Community Court (opened in June 1999); St. Paul (Minnesota) Community Court (opened in 2000); Babylon (New York) Community Court, (opened in September 2006); Harlem Community Justice Center (opened in May 2001); Hempstead (New York) Community Court (opened in June 1999); Red Hook ( Brooklyn, New York) Community Justice Center (opened in April 2000); Syracuse (New York) Community Court (opened in July 2001); Gresham (Oregon) Community Court (opened in March 1998); Westside Community Court in Portland, Oregon (opened in April 2001); Overland Park Community Court in Clackamas County, Oregon (opened in January 2005); Philadelphia Community Court (opened in February 2002); Frayser Community Court in Memphis, Tennessee (opened in February 2000); Whitehaven Community Court in Memphis, Tennessee (opened in September 2002); Downtown Austin Community Court (opened in October 1999); South Dallas/Fair Park Community Court (opened in October 2004); West Dallas Community Court (opened November 2008); San Antonio Community Court (opened in May 2006); Seattle Community Court (opened in March 2005).

USA Today reported in 2008 that interest in community courts was growing, citing new courts in the works in Newark, N.J., among other cities.

Interest in the American community court model has increased abroad. A report by the Open Society Institute issued in 2008 found that by the end of 2007, 52 community courts were operational around the globe. The report said an additional 27 new courts were slated to open in coming years.

== United Kingdom ==
Based on the success of pilot community court projects in North Liverpool and Salford, in 2006 the British government announced plans to create 11 new community courts, all of which were up and running by early 2008.

== South Africa ==
Seventeen community court projects are in operation in South Africa. (In South Africa, the term "community court" also refers to a form of tribunal also known as Courts for Chiefs and Headmen; in these courts, an authorised African headman or his deputy may decide cases using indigenous law and custom, brought before him by an African against another African within his area of jurisdiction.) The Downtown Community Court opened in Vancouver, Canada, in 2008. The court addresses the Downtown Eastside neighborhood. The court seeks both to reduce the harm caused to the community by crime and use collaborative case management to help offenders make long-term changes to their behavior. However, Laura Track, a lawyer and housing campaigner for Vancouver's Pivot Society, says there's a legal log jam ahead unless the government invests millions more in housing and treatment programs. This new court is presided over by Justice Thomas Gove.

A community court project is also being planned for Glasgow, Scotland.

== Australia ==
In Australia, the term "community court" was used in Western Australia and Northern Territory to refer to a type of court that is designed to be culturally competent for Indigenous Australians; however As of July 2022 both of these, the Aboriginal Community Court in WA (2006–2015), and the Community Courts in the NT (2005–2012), are no longer operational.

Equivalents in other states have been the Nunga Court in South Australia (the oldest of its type, established 1999); Koori Court, in Victoria (2002–present); Murri Court, in Queensland (2002-2012, 2016–present); and Youth Koori Court in New South Wales.

== See also ==
- Indigenous court (disambiguation)

== Sources ==
- Berman, Greg; John Feinblatt (2005). Good Courts: The Case for Problem-Solving Justice. New York, New York: The New Press. p. 237. ISBN 1-56584-973-6.
- Marchetti and Daly (2004), 'Indigenous courts and justice practices in Australia', Trends & Issues in Crime and Criminal Justice No. 277.
- YOUTH JUSTICE CONFERENCING AND RE-OFFENDING, Hennessey Hayes & Kathleen Daly, School of Criminology and Criminal Justice, Griffith University, Brisbane, Queensland https://web.archive.org/web/20070721212436/http://www.griffith.edu.au/school/ccj/kdaly_docs/daly_pt2_paper_3b.pdf and http://www.griffith.edu.au/school/ccj/kdaly_docs/kdaly_paper_17.rtf
- Crime Prevention and Socio-Legal Reform on Aboriginal Communities in Queensland by Barbara Miller, Aboriginal Law Bulletin, [1991] AboriginalLB 18, http://www.austlii.edu.au/au/journals/AboriginalLB/1991/18.html
- Recidivism in the Northern Territory: Adult Prisoners Released in 2001–02, Joe Yick & Peter Warner https://web.archive.org/web/20070902105724/http://www.aic.gov.au/conferences/2005-abs/yick.pdf
- Chief Magistrate's Guidelines on Community Courts, 27 May 2005.
- Peltz, Bina. Courting the Community: Legal Transplants, Legal Innovation, and the Community Court Model. Princeton, New Jersey: Unpublished Thesis, 2015. http://arks.princeton.edu/ark:/88435/dsp01r781wj345
