= Youth Koori Court =

Court system for Indigenous young people in New South Wales, Australia

The Youth Koori Court (YKC) is a court tailored to the needs of Aboriginal and Torres Strait Islander children and young people who engage with the criminal justice system in the state of New South Wales, Australia. It operates out of the Children's Court of New South Wales. The first such court was established in the western Sydney suburb of Parramatta in 2015, with another created in Surry Hills to serve the city of Sydney in early 2019, and the first regional YKC established in Dubbo in 2022. The YKC involves older members of the Aboriginal community to help the youths to engage with their culture, among other measures.

== Background ==
The word Koori refers to Aboriginal people from south-east Australia, in the regions now encompassing the Victoria as well as southern New South Wales. The idea of the Youth Koori Court is to engage older members of the Aboriginal community, including elders, with Aboriginal young offenders who engage with the justice system, as a steadying influence.

== History ==
The first Youth Koori Court was initially established as a pilot program in Parramatta in 2015, in response to the over-representation of Aboriginal young people in the criminal justice system in New South Wales. After its initial successful pilot phase, it was granted funding to make it permanent. The court was noted as achieving some success, with its funding extended in 2018 for another three years. Extra funding of A$220,000 was provided to fund caseworkers at Marist Youth Care in June 2017, to assist the young offenders appearing before the court. In 2018 the court was expanded, opening up another court in Surry Hills on 6 February 2019 for Indigenous youth in the centre of the city.

In July 2022, the first regional Youth Koori Court was established in Dubbo.

== Operation ==
The Youth Koori Court operates as part of the Children's Court of New South Wales. It has the same powers as the Children's Court, but uses a modified process to better involve Aboriginal and Torres Strait Islander young people, their families and the broader community in the process. With the assistance of elders and other respected people from the communities, the Youth Koori Court seeks first to identify risk factors, such as homelessness, disengagement from education, drug and alcohol or other health issues that may be affecting the young person's involvement with the criminal justice system. Several actions follow:

- An action and support plan is developed with the young person to help them to address these risk factors and improve connections with their culture and their community.
- The implementation of the action and support plan is monitored by the YKC over a period of months and the young person is required to come back to court several times.
- At the end of the process the judicial officer will sentence the young person taking into consideration the steps the young person has taken to address their issues.

It is an alternative to the main judicial system, providing an optional diversionary pathway for Aboriginal children and young people. It is intended to help to address some of the underlying social factors that contribute to young offending by young Aboriginal people, such as inadequate housing, lack of engagement in the education system, substance abuse and unemployment.

According to a 2018 media release:

The Youth Koori Court brings Elders or respected Aboriginal community members, lawyers and police around a table to discuss the issues that may be impacting a young person's offending behaviour. It puts sensible, tailored plans in place for each offender to encourage connection with family, community and culture to stop anti-social behaviour from escalating. Participants have up to 12 months to complete the program and their performance is taken into account during the sentencing process.

== Impact ==
Statistics collected and interpreted by the NSW Bureau of Crime Statistics and Research showed that young people who had gone through a Youth Koori Court are around 40% less likely to be imprisoned than those who go through the ordinary court system, and there is no adverse effect on recidivism.

== See also ==
- Aboriginal Community Court, in Western Australia (2006–2015)
- Circle sentencing, also in New South Wales
- Community court
- Community court (Northern Territory) (2005–2012)
- Koori Court, in Victoria (2002–present)
- Murri Court, in Queensland (2002-2012, 2016–present)
