= Sarah Bradley (judge) =

Australian jurist (born 1956)

Her Honour Judge Sarah Bradley AO
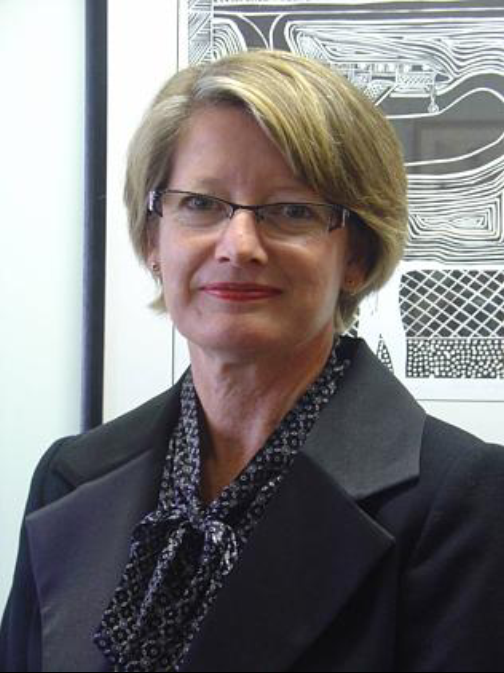

Judge of the District Court of Queensland
- Incumbent
- Assumed office 25 March 1999

Personal details
- Born: 10 March 1956 (age 70)
- Education: University of Queensland
- Occupation: Judge, lawyer

Sarah Bradley AO (born 10 March 1956) is an Australian jurist, who has been a judge of the District Court of Queensland since 25 March 1999, and a judge of the Children's Court of Queensland.

== Qualifications ==
- B.A. University of Queensland 1976
- LL.B. University of Queensland 1978

== Career ==
Legal Officer in Prosecution Section of Solicitor-General’s Office, Brisbane July 1978 to November 1979.

Employed Solicitor, Mooloolaba and O’Dwyer and Murphy, Solicitors (subsequently O’Dwyer and Bradley), Woodridge November 1979 to August 1981. August 1982 to June 1984

Partner in firm, O’Dwyer and Bradley, Solicitors July 1984 to March 1990

Part-time Member of the Misconduct Tribunals within the Criminal Justice Commission of Queensland August 1990 to August 1993

Chair or co-chair of Mediation Conferences for Legal Aid Office (Qld) February 1991 to June 1993

Stipendiary Magistrate - Rockhampton August 1993 to November 1995

Stipendiary Magistrate - Townsville December 1995 to March 1999

Member of District Court Judges Aboriginal and Torres Strait Islander Committee since 2000 Member of the council of James Cook University since 2002. President of Australian Association of Women Judges since 2006.

== Rape case controversy ==
Judge Bradley attracted criticism in 2007 when it was widely reported in the Australian media that three adults and six teenagers who gang raped a 10-year-old girl escaped jail. She did not record convictions against six teenagers and gave suspended sentences to the three others over the 2005 gang rape at the indigenous Aurukun community on Cape York. Three others were given suspended sentences.

The girl had "probably agreed" to have sex with the nine, Judge Bradley said during her sentencing remarks. Australian Prime Minister Kevin Rudd announced his disgust at Bradley's decision, but refused to prevent such abuses occurring again.

In 2013 Bradley controversially refused a prosecution request for an adjournment when an alleged rape victim left the court before completing her testimony. Two days later the accused was alleged to have raped, stabbed and tortured the same victim.
