= Nunga =

Term of self-reference for Australian Aboriginal people in South Australia

Nunga is a term of self-identification for Aboriginal Australians, originally used by Aboriginal people in the southern settled areas of South Australia, and now used throughout Adelaide and surrounding towns. It is used by contrast with Gunya, which refers to non-Aboriginal persons. The use of "Nunga" by non-Aboriginal people is not always regarded as appropriate.

The term comes from Wirangu, the language spoken around Ceduna, and is effectively the South Australian counterpart of Koori as used in New South Wales and Victoria. Other words used for Aboriginal people in South Australia are Anangu (north-west), Nharla (western Lake Eyre Basin), and Yura (Flinders Ranges).

In the variety of Aboriginal English known as Nunga English, most of the terms of Indigenous origin are from Ngarrindjeri, with quite a number from the west coast (Kokatha and Wirangu) and some from Narungga, but very few from the Kaurna language (the language of Adelaide). The language evolved from the people who grew up in missions such as Point Pearce (Bukkiyana) and Point McLeay (Raukkan), and so reflects their experience with European culture. Some are working on the emergence of a separate Kaurna culture, so would like to see Kaurna language to be taught rather than Nunga English.

Use of the term in official capacities includes the Nunga Court (Aboriginal sentencing courts), the "Nunga Way" cultural teaching framework for schools, the SA Department of Human Services' Yunga Nungas program (to support Aboriginal young people with complex needs) and Nunga Screen (a film event, formerly known as Black Screen).

In day to day speech and slang, especially along parts of the Eastern Coast of Australia, the terms "Nunga" or "Nunga-Nunga" are frequently used in a similar fashion to the way "Nigger" is used in North America. The meaning is very context based and can be easily misinterpreted if not seen in context.

== See also ==
Media related to Nunga people at Wikimedia Commons

- List of Australian Aboriginal group names - lists the hundreds of groups and sub-groups
