= Law Reform Commission of Western Australia =

Advisory commission in Western Australia

The Law Reform Commission of Western Australia is a commission to investigate, review and advise on the reform of the law in Western Australia, a state of Australia. The present commission came into existence on 31 October 1972.

== History ==
There has been a history of law reform in common law countries such as Australia. Prior to the establishment of the commission, various parliamentary inquiries, ad hoc commissions, or panels had advised on law reform.

One of the first systematic attempts was in 1822 and 1823, when Commissioner John Thomas Bigge, a former Chief Justice of Trinidad, prepared three reports on the state of the colony of New South Wales. Those reports recommended various changes in the legal system, government, and use of convicts in the colonies. The present commission is a successor to that grand history of law reform in Australia.

The commission was the first permanent body established in Western Australia to continually conduct and investigate law reform. Its establishment was important as it was an independent body that could devote its deliberations full-time to examining law reform in the state

== Constitution ==
The commission is established under the Law Reform Commission Act 1972. The Governor of Western Australia may appoint members of the commission. Two members are to be full-time and three members are to be part-time.

The part-time members are to include a lawyer, a senior academic from a university, and a senior office of the Western Australian State Solicitor Office. Part-time members are appointed for three years.

The full-time members are to be lawyers or other people who in the opinion of the governor have the necessary experience to be on the commission. Full-time members are appointed for five years.

The chairperson is elected by the members of the commission. The current chairperson is Gillian Braddock SC.

== Functions ==
The Commission from time to time will make recommendations to the Attorney-General of Western Australia for possible references for the Commission to consider. The Attorney-General may direct the Commission to report on those suggestions, or may direct the Commission to report on other matters. The Attorney-General may also direct the Commission as to the order in which reports are to be considered.

After completing the report, the Commission forwards it to the Attorney General, who then is required to table it in the Western Australian Parliament.

The Commission is also required to make an annual report on its work during the year. The commission's reporting year starts in July and ends in June.

The report is then provided to the Attorney-General, who may then table the report in the State Parliament.

== Work of the commission ==
Some of the reports of the commission include reports on Courts of Petty Session, the criminal justice system, law of contempt, aboriginal customary laws and the judicial review of administrative decisions.
