= Police prosecutor =

In certain jurisdictions, police prosecutors are employed by the police, as counsel for the prosecution, to present cases in court.

Without robust safeguards, the lack of prosecutorial independence can result in a prosecuting environment which creates the opportunity for widespread abuse of power and malicious prosecution. Furthermore, the independence and objectivity of police prosecutors may be compromised by close contact with police officers, adherence to police culture, and a desire to maintain positive relationships with fellow police officers and staff. These factors could result in weak cases being presented in court or and increase in the frequency of miscarriage of justice incidents.

== Australia ==
In Australia, all States and Territories (other than the Australian Capital Territory) employ Police Prosecutors to work in their summary courts. These police prosecutors are almost exclusively sworn police officers who are trained to act as advocates in summary criminal prosecutions. In Western Australia the police prosecutors work in concert with that state's Director of Public Prosecutions. Some police prosecutors hold legal qualifications; however, this is not a requirement to perform the role.

== New Zealand ==
In the judicial system of New Zealand, a police prosecutor is a lawyer employed by the police to present cases in District Court. This may be a sworn member of the police (normally a sergeant) or, in larger courts, a civilian lawyer employed as a non-sworn member of the police. In smaller courts, the police prosecutors will normally consist entirely of sworn officers, while in larger courts a combination of sworn and non-sworn prosecutors will be employed. Unlike most other common law countries which have discontinued police prosecutions, New Zealand has continued the practice.

In New Zealand, police ultimately decide whether to investigate, prosecute, or pursue alternatives in criminal matters. Police likewise decide what charges will be laid and, where available, decide whether to proceed summarily or by indictment, all without direct oversight of the prosecutorial process.

The New Zealand Police Prosecution Service (PPS) has faced scrutiny in the courts and academia over its efficacy, fairness, and independence, which have found to contribute to a degradation in the right to equal justice and due process of law in New Zealand. Before deciding to lay charges, police prosecutors are required by law to follow the Solicitor-General’s Prosecution Guidelines, which outline the standards by which all prosecution decisions should be made. However, in practice, government reviews of the PPS have shown that these standards are not applied consistently across New Zealand. The only available means for a defendant who believes they may be the victim of abuse of process, negligent prosecution, or malicious prosecution is to initiate a judicial review proceeding against police in the High Court, which is often prohibitively expensive and therefore rarely undertaken.

== Denmark ==
The Chief Constable is public prosecutor in the first instance and thus responsible for the prosecution (investigation and prosecution, as well as conduct of criminal proceedings in the courts). The Chief Constable is also the chief of the local police. The Chief Constable is usually a trained lawyer, but there is no legal requirement for this. A Chief Prosecutor, a trained lawyer, assists the Chief Constable with the function as prosecutor. Subordinate prosecutor, all of whom are trained lawyers, assists the Chief Prosecutor. As public prosecutor the Chief Constable is subordinate to the State Attorneys and the Attorney General.

== Norway ==
Police prosecutors in Norway, who are trained lawyers, are uniformed, sworn police officers. They are leading police investigations in criminal cases; decides the issue of prosecution in criminal cases, including whether to prosecute, charge, issue a citation, or dismiss the case; they are also presenting the criminal cases in first instance. As prosecutors, the police prosecutors are part of the Norwegian Prosecuting Authority, and are subordinate to the State Attorneys. In Norway, it is argued that the integration of prosecution with the police, creates an organizational closeness between police investigators and public prosecutors which improves the quality of, and facilitates the decision-making process in, criminal investigations.
