= Indigenous Australian customary law =

Indigenous Australian customary law or Indigenous Australian customary lore refers to the legal systems and practices uniquely belonging to Indigenous Australians of Australia, that is, Aboriginal and Torres Strait Islander people. Before the arrival of Europeans, death sentences were carried out under Aboriginal customary law. Customary law has not otherwise been relevant to the development of Australian common law by courts.

== Background and description ==
Indigenous peoples of Australia comprise two groups with very different histories, ethnicities and customs: Aboriginal peoples and Torres Strait Islanders. Torres Strait Islanders are "strictly monogamous [and] mostly church-married". The most notable customary practice differing from usual practice among non-Indigenous Australians is that of adoption, known as kupai omasker, by members of the extended family or friends. The reasons differ depending on which of the many Torres Islander cultures the person belongs to.

Most studies have looked exclusively at Aboriginal law and lore, with regard to personal and social customs.

Aboriginal customary law developed over time from accepted moral and social norms within Indigenous societies. They regulate human behaviour, mandate specific sanctions for non-compliance, and connect people with the land and with each other, through a system of relationships.

Indigenous customary law is not uniform across Australia, and systems differ greatly between language groups, clans, and regions.

Within some Aboriginal Australian communities, the words "law" and "lore" are words used to differentiate between the Indigenous and post-colonial legal systems. The word "law" is taken to refer to the legal system introduced during the European colonisation of Australia, whereas the word "lore" is used to refer to the Indigenous customary system. Learned from childhood, lore dictates the rules on how to interact with the land, kinship, and community.

Aboriginal customary lore is intertwined with cultural customs, practices, and stories from the Dreamtime. Customs are passed on through the generations by means of cultural works such as songlines, stories and dance. Those cultural works are passed on by oral tradition. A report by the Australian Government in 1986 did not find any codified versions of Indigenous customary lore, but acknowledged that the existing knowledge of Indigenous Australian traditions may be sufficient to be considered as such.

=== Capital punishment ===
Before the arrival of Europeans, death sentences were carried out under Aboriginal customary law, either directly or through sorcery. In some cases the condemned could be denied mortuary rites.

== Recognition by the colonial legal system ==
Legislative bodies since the late-twentieth century have investigated the concept of incorporating Indigenous laws more formally into post-colonial legal systems. Reports by the Australian Law Reform Commission and the Law Reform Commission of Western Australia have discussed the desirability of recognising customary law in matters involving Aboriginal Australians. In the Northern Territory, some statutes and courts make explicit reference to customary law where useful in identifying relationships and social expectations. These changes have sometimes been controversial, especially in cases where customary law is imprecise or infringes upon human rights.

On 17 July 2020 the Queensland Government introduced a bill in parliament to legally recognise the Torres Strait Islander practice of traditional adoptions (kupai omasker), which was passed as the Meriba Omasker Kaziw Kazipa Act 2020 ("For Our Children's Children") on 8 September 2020.

== Land rights ==
European settlers in Australia assumed the legal fiction of Australia as terra nullius during the period of colonisation. For that reason, lore was explicitly ignored by Australian courts, both during and after the colonial era.

In 1992, post-colonial law recognised Indigenous lore as giving rise to a valid legal claim in the Mabo decision, in which the legal fiction of terra nullius was discarded. While the court found that the crown held radical title over all land in Australia (including land subject to Indigenous legal claims), the High Court held that it would recognise customary legal rights to land; if and only if those legal rights had been maintained continuously since settlement, and not displaced by an inconsistent grant in title to another person (such as a grant in freehold). Indigenous customary claims to land are regulated by the Native Title Act 1993.

== Regional examples ==
=== Arnhem Land ===
Madayin is the customary law of the Yolngu people, which embodies the rights and responsibilities of the owners of the law, or citizens (rom watangu walal, or simply rom). As well as the objects that symbolise the law, oral rules, names and song cycles, and the sacred places that are used to maintain, develop and provide education in the law. Rom and its accompanying ceremonies are concepts and practices shared by the neighbouring Anbarra people, also in Arnhem Land.

== See also ==
- Australian Aboriginal Sovereignty
- Customary law in South Africa
- Indigenous Australian traditional custodianship
- Indigenous law
