= Murri Court =

Murri Courts are a type of specialist community court for sentencing Aboriginal and Torres Strait Islander people in Queensland, Australia. The first Murri Court was established in Brisbane in August 2002, with more being established throughout the state over the next 10 years, catering for both adult and young offenders, under the Magistrates and Children's Court networks. After being closed down by the government in September 2012 as a cost-cutting exercise, they were reopened in April 2016 under the new Palaszczuk government. As of July 2022 there are Murri Courts in 15 locations throughout Queensland.

== History ==
Murri Courts were established after the former Chief Magistrate of Queensland, Di Fingleton, became aware of the Nunga Court, which had been established in South Australia in 1999 with the aim of reducing the over-representation of Indigenous people in prison and other Indigenous justice issues by involving the Aboriginal and Torres Strait Islander community in the sentencing of Indigenous offenders. She asked Deputy Chief Magistrate Brian Hine to view and report back on the system in operation, with a view to developing something similar in Queensland. Hine did this, afterwards meeting with members of the local Indigenous community members and of relevant agencies to discuss the concept of a Murri Court in Brisbane. The GUMURRII Centre at Griffith University was a key player in the establishment of Murri Courts.

The first Murri Court was established in August 2002 in Brisbane, with further courts rolled out in Rockhampton, Mount Isa, a youth Murri court in Brisbane, Caboolture and Townsville. Most also catered for children (young offenders). The north Queensland Murri Courts were also open to Pacific Islander offenders.

These special courts, modelled on the Nunga Court in South Australia and Koori Court in Victoria, incorporated Aboriginal customs and culture and included Elders in the sentencing process, to provide support and aid in the rehabilitation of Indigenous offenders.

As of 2006, Indigenous communities were also involved as advisers to the Children's or Magistrates Courts in Toowoomba, Woorabinda, Mackay, Tully, Mareeba, Innisfail, Mossman, Doomadgee, Normanton, Mornington Island, some Cape York communities, and Badu Island in the Torres Strait.

The Murri Courts, of which 14 remained by September 2012, were closed by the Queensland Government (Attorney-General Jarrod Bleijie) in December 2012, along with other specialist courts for drug offenders, the homeless and intellectually disabled, based on their perceived lack of effectiveness in relation to what they cost. The decision was criticised by the Queensland Law Society.

The courts were reintroduced by the Palaszczuk government in April 2016.

== Operation ==
Murri courts are available to eligible offenders who pleaded guilty to an offence falling under the auspices of the Magistrates Court of Queensland. In these courts, the magistrate and the offender, along with everyone else present, sit at the same level, and an Elder sits next to the offender, and advises the magistrate throughout, including advice on culturally appropriate sentencing. Police prosecutors do not wear uniforms. The process often helps offenders to reconnect with their culture and communities. The Elder also addresses the offender directly about their offending behaviour and how it affects the community, but the magistrate decides the final sentence, to avoid family or cultural pressures on the Elder.

In Queensland, the courts are not underpinned by specific legislation as of 2013), but the Penalties and Sentences Act 1992 (Qld) included a general legislative foundation for the sentencing process and the participation of Indigenous community members in Murri Courts.

In October 2020, the Queensland Sentencing Advisory Council released a video explaining the operation of and eligibility for the Murri Court as part of a series called Doing Justice Differently. The Brisbane Community Justice Group, which engages with the Murri Court each Wednesday (as of July 2022), supports both victims and offenders right through the legal process. They encourage offenders to engage with the Murri Court, and develop networks with other organisations that address issues impacting Indigenous people.

As of July 2022, there are Murri Courts in the Magistrates and Children's Courts in the following locations:

- Brisbane
- Caboolture
- Cairns
- Cherbourg
- Cleveland
- Ipswich
- Mackay
- Maroochydore
- Mount Isa
- Richlands
- Rockhampton
- St George
- Toowoomba
- Townsville
- Wynnum

== Evaluations ==
Two 2006 reviews found that the courts were "effective at engaging the Indigenous community in the legal process", and a 2005 report found reduced rates of recidivism among offenders sentenced in a Murri Court. By 2010 the number of Murri Courts had increased to 17, the highest number in any Australian jurisdiction. The Community Justice Group had a core relationship with the Murri Courts.

A 2019 review showed that the system of Murri Courts enjoyed widespread respect among the Indigenous community. In May 2022 the establishment of the Office of the Chief First Nations Justice Officer was announced, along with a new three-year government Reconciliation Action Plan with a strong focus on "reducing the over-representation of First Nations people in Queensland’s criminal justice system". As of May 2022, Murri Courts were once again operating in 15 locations, and the Queensland Government renewed its commitment to reconciliation and improvements in justice for Aboriginal peoples.
