= Australian Aboriginal elder =

Respected members of Indigenous Australian communities

Australian Aboriginal elders in the context of Aboriginal and Torres Strait Islander culture, is defined as "someone who has gained recognition as a custodian of knowledge and lore, and who has permission to disclose knowledge and beliefs". They may be male or female, and of any age, but must be trusted and respected by their community for their wisdom, cultural knowledge and community service. Elders provide support for their communities in the form of guidance, counselling and knowledge, which help tackle problems of health, education, unemployment and racism, particularly for younger people. They may be distinguished as one of two types: community elders and traditional elders. Elders play an important role in maintenance of culture, songs, oral histories, sacred stories, Aboriginal Australian languages, and dance, and are also educators who demonstrate leadership and skills in resolving conflicts. Elders also preside over ceremonies and other spiritual practices, and attend to the health and well-being of young people.

Elders are sometimes addressed by other Aboriginal people as Uncle or Aunty as a mark of respect. The honorific may be used by non-Aboriginal people, but generally only when permission is given to do so.

Self-determination advocacy organisation the Aboriginal Provisional Government was initially headed by a "Council of Elders" in accordance with the "traditions and beliefs of Aboriginal groups nationwide".

The Dreaming Path, a book written by the first Aboriginal CEO of an Australian TAFE, Paul Callaghan, in collaboration with Ngemba elder Paul Gordon, describes the important role played by elders in Aboriginal society. Some organisations have created formal elder-in-residence programs, such as the University of South Australia's Elders on Campus project, which helps to support Indigenous students.

The role of Aboriginal elders has also been the subject of academic research.

== See also ==
- Australian Aboriginal culture
- Elder (administrative title)
- Indigenous Australian customary law
- Indigenous Australian self-determination
- North American Indigenous elder
