= Judicial independence in Australia =

Foundational principle of Australia's legal system

Judicial independence is regarded as one of the foundation values of the Australian legal system, such that the High Court held in 2004 that a court capable of exercising federal judicial power must be, and must appear to be, an independent and impartial tribunal. Former Chief Justice Gerard Brennan described judicial independence as existing "to serve and protect not the governors but the governed", albeit one that "rests on the calibre and the character of the judges themselves". Despite general agreement as to its importance and common acceptance of some elements, there is no agreement as to each of the elements of judicial independence.

Aspects of judicial independence can be seen as complementary, such as appeals serving to ensure that decisions are made on the facts and law, but which also serves to enhance public confidence in the judiciary. This however is not always the case as there are other elements that require balance, for example public confidence in the judiciary necessarily impacts on security of tenure in that it requires the ability to remove judges who are unfit for office. Similarly there may be tension between tenure of existing judges and the appointment of the best available candidate to a judicial position. The principle of judicial independence was not always observed in colonial Australia.

== Impartial ==
The underlying principle is that a judge is an impartial decision maker, whether the parties are individuals, government or other corporate bodies, such that it is the "judge sitting on a case, who has heard the evidence and arguments, who makes the decision on the basis of an application of the law to the evidence and arguments presented". This carries with it the requirement that the judge is free from improper influences, whether from the parliament, executive or other powerful interest groups such as the media. The need for impartiality is reflected in the judicial oath “to do right to all manner of people, according to law, without fear or favour, affection or ill will”. The need for public confidence in the impartiality of the judiciary, that "justice must be done and be seen to be done", gives rise to the rule disqualifying a judge where "a fair-minded lay observer might reasonably apprehend that the judge might not bring an impartial and unprejudiced mind to the resolution of the question the judge is required to decide".

== Initial principles ==
The independence of the English judiciary is traditionally said to have been established by the Act of Settlement 1701 which made relevantly two provisions, that a judge's salary was required to be fixed on appointment and that the judge could only be removed by the crown on upon the address of both Houses of Parliament. These provisions did not apply to colonial judges, covered by the Colonial Leave of Absence Act 1782 (22 Geo. 3. c. 75 (Imp)), known as Burke's Act, which provided a judge could be removed by the governor and council of the colony, subject to the right of appeal to the Privy Council.

=== Immunity from suit ===
The common law of England has long held that a judge had immunity from being sued for any act within jurisdiction, even if the judge acted maliciously or corruptly. The courts have denied that rule exists for the protection of the malicious or corrupt judge, and justified it on the grounds of the public interest in the independence of the judiciary as being necessary for the administration of justice. The history of development of this immunity is complex, and the High Court held in 2006 that it is "ultimately, although not solely, founded in considerations of the finality of judgments".

=== Security of tenure ===
Security of tenure, leaving a judge free from influence resulting from the threat of removal, is generally said to be justified as an important feature of judicial independence. In the 1891 constitutional convention the protection required an address passed by the relevant houses of parliament. In Adelaide in 1897 the power to remove was limited to cases of "misbehaviour or incapacity", while in 1898 in Melbourne the convention added the requirement for proof, which Quick and Garran writing in 1901, said was to ensure that the judge should be heard in defence and that the charge had to be alleged in the address. In 1918 the High Court held that tenure must be for life to that particular court, not merely for a term of years.

Since the 20th century Australian judges accused of judicial misconduct can, generally, only be removed from office as a result of an address passed by the relevant houses of parliament, however the details vary. Some constitutions provide that a judge can only be removed on an address by parliament on specific grounds, being proved misbehaviour or incapacity. Similar provisions are found in legislation. Legislation in the other states and territories, provide that a judge can only be removed on an address by parliament, but it is only by convention that the concept of good behaviour is limited to the grounds of incapacity or misbehaviour.

There have been occasions in which judges have been removed by the abolition of their court. In 1878 the Governor of Victoria dismissed all judges of County Courts, Mines and Insolvency and all Chairman of General Sessions, as well as a large number of public servants. and only some, not all were subsequently reappointed. The Supreme Court held that County Court judges held office at pleasure and the Governor in council could remove them without cause. More recent examples of courts being abolished without protecting the tenure of the judges are the abolition of the Court of Petty Sessions (NSW) and its replacement by the Local Court in which all but six magistrates were appointed to the new court, and the abolition of the Victorian Accident Compensation Tribunal in 1992 by the Victorian government which by-passed the legislative removal mechanism and removed all judges.

Twice sitting judges have been removed as a result of the introduction of a retirement age. In 1918 the NSW Parliament passed the Judges Retirement Act, which introduced a compulsory retirement age of 70 which was applied to existing judges. The first judge to be affected was Richard Sly who had been appointed to the Supreme Court of NSW in 1908 and was forced to retire in 1920. More controversial was the similar action of the Queensland parliament in 1921 in passing the Judges Retirement Act. There was animosity between the Labor government and the judges, playing out through a series of cases challenging government actions and legislation. The effect of the Judges Retirement Act was that immediately upon proclamation three out of six judges, Chief Justice Cooper and Justices Real and Chubb were compulsorily retired, which permitted the government to appoint new judges.

=== Remuneration ===
The principle that judicial salaries should be known, fixed at the time of appointment and cannot be reduced during tenure is well established at all levels in Australia. In 1877 the Supreme Court of NSW held that a statutory requirement that a judge's salary could not be reduced required the payment of the full salary, even when the judge had failed to perform duties, in that case attending court in various towns in the northern district. It also prevented the executive from claiming repayment of the cost of appointing a temporary replacement. In 1907 the High Court held that the imposition of an income tax payable by all taxpayers was not a reduction in the judge's salary. One identified risk is that in real terms the remuneration may be continually cut by inflation. In 1954 the Judges of the Supreme Court of Victoria protested against what they said was the inadequacy of the increases proposed to be made to their salaries, under which the post-war inflation reduced the real value of their salaries. The High Court recognised the risk in 2004 stating that "There is no more effective means of depleting the substance of remuneration to an officeholder than by inattention on the part of the legislative or executive branch of government".

== Subsequent developments ==
=== Separation of Powers ===
The theory that the legislative, executive and judicial powers should be separated is attributed to both French political philosopher Baron de Montesquieu and English judge Sir William Blackstone, although Blackstone only went so far as to state the necessity for some degree of separation of the administration of justice from both parliament and the executive. Despite the theory, historically there was no formal separation of the English judiciary: the Lord Chancellor was a member of cabinet, the presiding officer of the House of Lords and the head of the judiciary, the Law Lords in the House of Lords were the final court of appeal and some serving judges sat in the House of Commons.

The drafters of the Australian constitution adopted the separation of federal judicial power, whilst maintaining the approach of the Australian colonies that Ministers of State are required to be members of parliament. The High Court has consistently maintained two requirements of the separation of federal judicial power, (1) only a judge can exercise federal judicial power, and (2) a federal court or judge cannot exercise executive or legislative power. In this way the separation of powers prevents the courts from exercising legislative or executive power, by reference to issues that are non-justiciable. The High Court acknowledged in the 2014 decision of Commonwealth Bank of Australia v Barker, that the evolution of the common law involves a law making function, however the courts are constrained by deciding the particular case and complex policy considerations are matters more appropriate for parliament.

The separation of powers is not a part of the constitutions of the States. Despite this the High Court has held that under the federal constitution state courts are repositories of federal judicial power, this gives rise to a requirement to maintain the institutional independence of state courts and judges.

The Chief Justice of NSW, Tom Bathurst, speaking in 2013, argued that courts in Australia do not operate entirely independently of the executive and parliament, noting that (1) the role of the courts is to apply the laws made by parliament, (2) judges are appointed and can be removed by the executive; and (3) courts are funded by the executive.

The separation of powers has not been thought to prevent the appointment of High Court judges to executive roles, such as the appointment of Sir Owen Dixon to be the Australian Minister to the United States, and the appointment of Chief Justice Sir Garfield Barwick to the National Debt Commission. Similarly numerous judges have been appointed to vice-regal roles, including the tradition of appointing High Court judges as deputies to the Governor-General for the opening of the first session of Parliament and the appointment of state judges, typically the Chief Justice, as Lieutenant-Governor or Acting Governor. The conferral of non-judicial functions on judges in their personal capacity, as opposed to their judicial capacity is referred to as the doctrine of persona designata. The doctrine does have limits and the High Court held in Hindmarsh Island Bridge case that the non-judicial function in that case was incompatible with judicial office.

More controversial was the advice being given to the Governor-General Sir John Kerr by Sir Garfield Barwick and Sir Anthony Mason during the 1975 Australian constitutional crisis. There have been various occasions in which a Governor-General or state Governor have sought the advice of a judge in relation to their powers, including Chief Justice Sir Samuel Griffith and Sir Edmund Barton advising both Lord Northcote and Sir Ronald Munro Ferguson; Sir Philip Street advising Sir Philip Game, the Governor of NSW, during the 1932 New South Wales constitutional crisis; Sir Owen Dixon advising Sir Dallas Brooks, the Governor of Victoria, in the 1950s. Dixon also gave discreet advice to the US Consul and influential public servants.

=== Appointment ===
There are three ways in which the appointment process has been thought to threaten judicial independence: political appointments, stacking the court with new appointments, and not appointing a sufficient number of judges for the workload. The power to appoint a judge lies exclusively at the discretion of the executive. This unfettered discretion gives rise to concerns expressed by Professor Blackshield that judicial appointments are political and made for political gain. Constitutional scholar Greg Craven argued that because High Court judges were appointed by the federal government, appointments were more likely to be made from lawyers who were sympathetic to a centralist point of view. Since 1979 the federal Attorney-General is required to consult with the Attorneys-General of the States in relation to the appointment of a judge to the High Court, however there is no requirement that consultation is reflected in who is appointed.

Former Chief Justice Harry Gibbs argued that politics should not play a positive or negative part in the selection of judges. Thirteen of the first thirty appointments to the High Court were serving or former politicians at the time of their appointment and appointments from either side of politics have been criticised as overtly political, such as the appointment of McTiernan, Evatt and Latham. Evatt was open about the policy considerations in his judgments. While Latham asserted the separation between law and politics, whether his decisions were consistent with that separation was open to question. Two prominent examples of the relevance of a judge having a centralist view are the appointment of Albert Piddington and the non-appointment of Sir Frederick Jordan. In 1913 Attorney-General Billy Hughes was looking to appoint judges to the High Court who took a broad view of federal powers and was accused of attempting to stack the High Court by increasing the number of judges from five to seven. Piddington was offered appointment after he had confirmed that he was "In sympathy with supremacy of Commonwealth powers", Piddington resigned from the High Court one month after his appointment following a strong media campaign against him. Jordan was considered a brilliant lawyer but was never appointed to the High Court, which Sir Owen Dixon described as a tragedy, hinting that it may have been due to his "queer views about federalism", a reference to Jordan's strenuous support for the power and rights of the States as against the Commonwealth. The appointment of a former politician is not always partisan, for example Robert McClelland a member of the Labor Party and former Attorney-General, was nominated for appointment to the Family Court by the Liberal–National government. Whilst he was Attorney-General, McClelland had implemented a process intended to achieve greater transparency that federal judges were appointed on merit, however these were never formalised through legislation and were abandoned by the new government in 2013. As of December 2015 there were significant variations in Australia regarding the use of stated criteria, advertising, consultation and formal interviews in the appointment process.

=== Public confidence ===
Felix Frankfurter is reported to have said "The Court’s authority, consisting of neither the purse nor the sword, rests ultimately on substantial public confidence in its moral sanction", reflecting earlier comments in the essay Federalist No. 78 by Alexander Hamilton. Former Chief Justice Anthony Mason stated that judges highly value judicial independence and impartial decision making on the assumption that they are associated with public confidence in the judicial system generally, a value reflecting the judges' consciousness of the need to protect the authority of the courts and the spirit of obedience to the law. Mason questioned whether the public appreciates and values judicial independence as highly as judges do. The need to maintain public confidence in the judicial system has been stated as the foundation for a range of different rules and procedures, such as punishment for contempt of court, disqualification of a judge for the reasonable apprehension of bias, the process by which cases are allocated to a particular judge, and the need for judges to behave courteously in court. Former Chief Justice Murray Gleeson questioned whether public confidence is a theoretical construct used to objectify judicial reasoning, stating that the foundational aspects of judicial independence are not matters of wide interest. Gleeson suggests that public confidence may consist of taking things for granted rather than reasoned opinion.

== Other considerations ==
=== Misconduct not warranting removal ===
Gleeson has stated that in his experience as President of the Judicial Commission of NSW the difficult cases were those in which the misconduct would not justify removal of the judge, noting that the Chief Justice or head of jurisdiction had the capacity to advise, warn and take appropriate administrative steps, but beyond that were unable to penalise another judge. One option was to move the judge to other duties or another location. After Jeffrey Bent was removed as a judge in NSW, he was appointed Chief Justice of Grenada. Similarly John Willis had previously been removed as a judge in Upper Canada following a clash with Sir Peregrine Maitland. He spent time in British Guiana before accepting a post to NSW. In Sydney Willis clashed with Chief Justice Sir James Dowling. Governor Gipps appointed Willis to the position of Resident judge for the District of Port Phillip. There was no less conflict in Melbourne, where Willis clashed with the press, the legal fraternity, and members of the public and he was removed by Governor Gipps.

A different approach was taken with Frederick Meymott, a judge of the District Court of NSW in 1876. Over a number of years Meymott had failed to attend various courts in the northern district. The Executive Council thought that removal was too harsh a penalty and decided to admonish and reprimand Meymott, with the controversy being limited to the unsuccessful attempt to reduce his salary by the amount of additional expense incurred to replace him. 70 years later in 1952 County Court of Victoria judge Len Stretton was sent a written rebuke for his remarks that he "would not punish people trying to live decent lives in the degradation of emergency housing camps if the State did not want to do anything to help them", referring to the camp in Watsonia. Cowen and Derham argued that the only power was to remove a judge for misconduct and the independence of the judiciary meant it was improper for the executive to admonish a judge.

An administrative measure that has been taken is in relation to the allocation of work. Examples include:

- James Staples was a deputy president of the Australian Conciliation and Arbitration Commission, with the same rank and status as a Federal Court judge. Staples was isolated within the commission and the duties he was allocated were significantly reduced from 1979. He was not allocated any duties between 1985 and the abolition of the commission in 1988.
- In 2013, shortly after Anne Bampton's appointment to the Supreme Court, she was driving after consuming alcohol when she hit and injured a cyclist at Glenside. Bampton pleaded guilty to driving with excess blood alcohol and driving without due care. Bampton did not resign nor did the Parliament seek her removal. The Chief Justice Chris Kourakis decided that for twelve months Bampton would not be allocated to cases involving a driving offence nor where an offender was "materially affected by alcohol".
- Garry Neilson, a NSW District Court judge, was found by the Judicial Commission of NSW to have made comments that undermined confidence in the judiciary, and amounted to inappropriate judicial conduct. The Commission recommended that Neilson not be allocated to sit on cases involving sexual offences.
- In 2018 Victorian Magistrate Richard Pithouse was charged with failing to stop after an accident. Whilst he was awaiting charges he was removed from hearing traffic matters and criminal cases. While Pithouse acknowledged his wrongdoing, no conviction was recorded as he was placed on the Court's diversion program for first-time offenders and returned to full duties.

There are limits to the extent to which administrative measures can address inappropriate judicial conduct. Greg Borchers, a judge of the Local Court (NT) and Youth Justice Court (NT) had been found by Chief Judge Lowndes to have engaged in inappropriate judicial conduct when sentencing a 13-year-old boy in Tennant Creek. Chief Judge Lowndes decided that the appropriate response was that Borchers should not be allocated to the Youth Justice Court in Alice Springs. There were however only 4 magistrates in Alice Springs to cover a circuit of 10 courts and in each town the same judge would sit as the Local Court and the Youth Justice Court. Thus the only ways to avoid Judge Borchers sitting in the Youth Justice Court in those towns were either he did not go on circuit, increasing the workload on the other 3 judges or 2 of the 4 judges would need to travel to each town so that the other judge could hear youth matters. Chief Judge Lowndes decided that Judge Borchers would continue to sit on youth matters on circuit, including in Tennant Creek where the complaint arose.

=== Incapacity ===
In relation to NSW Local Court Magistrate Jennifer Betts, the Judicial Commission held that incapacity extended beyond physical or mental incapacity caused by an identifiable disorder, referring to examples of alcoholism, drug dependency, senility or debilitating illness, to include "incapacity to discharge the duties of judicial office in a manner that accords with recognised standards of judicial propriety". Thus incapacity requires knowledge of what the judicial officer is required to do and the circumstances under which those duties must be performed.

One of the features of Magistrate Maloney's case was that it was revealed in 2011 that he had previously been the subject of complaints before the Conduct Division in 1999, which resulted in him giving an undertaking “not to be too loquacious, not to interrupt solicitors, not to introduce matters reflecting his personal experiences, to be more judicial and to allow matters to run their course without interfering”, matters similar to the complaints dealt with in 2011. The concern in Magistrate Maloney's case was not that he would be unfit while he was undergoing treatment, but rather what happened if he stopped. Similarly the issues with Magistrate Betts appears to have arisen in the times in which she stopped taking her medication. The difficulty with supervision of judicial officers was highlighted by the judgment of Hoeben J in the Supreme Court in relation to Magistrate Maloney:

119. ... it is inherent in the judicial function that the sort of supervisory constraints which the evidence identified as appropriate to those in the medical profession with a bipolar 2 condition, could not be applied to judicial officers. The principle of judicial independence would simply not allow it. Most particularly a performance assessment and oversight by other medical practitioners would not be possible in the case of a judicial officer.
120. ... An undertaking not to engage in loquaciousness etc (the 1999 undertaking) or to provide judgments on time (Justice Bruce) are very different to a commitment to work under supervision by another judicial officer, the terms of which were never identified and which of its nature seems to be inconsistent with judicial independence.

The Judicial Commission of NSW thought, in relation to Magistrates Betts and Maloney, that there was no alternative to their removal. The Legislative Council however disagreed.

=== Financial and administrative autonomy of the courts ===
More controversial is the proposition that reliance on funding from government for the operation of the courts is itself a threat to the independence of the judiciary. The United Nations basic principles only goes so far as the duty to "provide adequate resources to enable the judiciary to properly perform its functions". Writing in 1991 Justice McGarvie of the Supreme Court of Victoria asserted that judicial independence required that the judges must control the premises, facilities, staff and budget of their court. A contrary view was expressed by Church and Sallman who noted that executive administration of the courts had not prevented the judiciary in Australia from maintaining independence for a considerable time.

=== Performance indicators ===
The use of statistics and performance indicators as a measure of the performance of courts and judges is controversial. In 2013 Chief Justice Bathurst identified the way in which this performance is measured as one of the most substantial risks to the separation of powers. In 1994 the Federal Court rejected an attempt to argue that the relatively high number of appeals against decisions of a particular person as a measure of apprehended bias. In 2016 the Full Court of the Federal Court rejected, as irrelevant to an apprehension of bias, evidence that Judge Sandy Street found in favour of the Minister for Immigration and Border Protection in 99.21% of matters he decided. In 2018 the Australian Financial Review published a series of articles comparing the time Federal Court judges took to deliver judgments and the number of paragraphs per day. In the 2018 Victorian state election the Liberal Party campaigned on a platform that they would publish data on court performance including sentencing records, sitting times and successful appeals.
