= List of Australian judges whose security of tenure was challenged =

Security of tenure, leaving a judge free from improper influence resulting from an unjustified threat of removal, is generally said to be an important feature of judicial independence in Australia. The emergence of responsible government in the Australian colonies in the 19th century saw the emergence of judicial independence, such that by Federation in 1901, federal judges and supreme court judges accused of judicial misconduct could, generally, only be removed from office as a result of an address passed by the relevant houses of parliament.

Name	Jurisdiction	Court	Date	Result	Comments	Notes
Jeffery Bent	NSW	Supreme Court of Civil Judicature	11 December 1816	Removed	The Colonial Secretary, Earl Bathurst, had decided to remove Bent in January 1816. This had not been received in NSW when Governor Lachlan Macquarie issued a Government Order which declared him to be 'positively and absolutely removed from his appointment'. Bent was subsequently appointed Chief Justice of Grenada (1820–1833) (where he was twice suspended), of St Lucia (1833–1836) and of British Guiana from 1836 until his death in 1852.	
John Willis	Port Phillip District	Supreme Court	24 June 1843	Removed	Willis was notified on 24 June 1843 that he had been amoved by Governor Gipps, however the Privy Council subsequently held that while there were sufficient grounds for his removal, he should have been given an opportunity to be heard. His appointment was revoked by Queen Victoria in August 1846.	
Algernon Montagu	Van Diemen's Land	Supreme Court	31 December 1847	Removed	Montagu was removed by Lieutenant-Governor Sir William Denison after an economic depression left him “financially embarrassed”. Montague used his judicial office to obstruct a creditor from recovering a debt and dismissed a case where he had overdue debts owed to the two 2 defendants. The Privy Council held there were procedural issues, but that his dismissal was justified. Legal academic David Clark stated in 2013 that the real reason for Montague's removal was his decision that the Dogs Act, which imposed a tax, was invalid.	
Benjamin Boothby	SA	Supreme Court	29 July 1867	Removed	There were a number of attempts to have Benjamin Boothby removed by the Colonial Office, but these were rebuffed. It was then decided in South Australia that the Governor could remove him and Boothby got a hearing of sorts, which descended into farce, including the prosecutor giving evidence against Boothby. He appealed to the Privy Council and one of his challenges was that he had been appointed by the Colonial Secretary and so the Governor had no power to remove him, however Boothby died before it was heard.	
Frederick Meymott	NSW	District Court	5 October 1876	Reprimanded & expenses deducted from salary	Over a number of years Meymott had failed to attend various courts in the northern district. The Executive Council decided not to remove the judge and instead admonished and reprimanded Meymott and deducted the expenses of a replacement from his judicial salary. In the Supreme Court the majority, Martin CJ & Faucett J, held that there was no power to reduce a judge's salary and that the only way to deal with misconduct by a judge was to remove them.	
Frederick Meymott	NSW	District Court	5 November 1880	Removed	There was a Royal Commission into Meymott's conduct which recommended that he be removed from office. Meymott was given an opportunity to appear before the Governor Lord Augustus Loftus and he was removed.	
William Hirst	Qld	District Court	3 January 1878	Removed	Samuel Griffith, the Attorney-General, suspended Hirst on charges that (1) he was absent without leave, (2) writing cheques without the funds to cover them and (3) there were outstanding judgements for debts against him & (4) he heard 3 cases in which he was the defendant concerning money demands & where he had no defence. On 5 January 1878 the Gazette announced that the Governor, with the advice of the Executive Council, had been pleased to remove him.	
Alexander Onslow	WA	Supreme Court	February 1890	Not removed	In 1887 Governor Broome "interdicted" Onslow from his functions as Chief Justice, for the alleged premature and improper publication of correspondence, confirmed by the Executive Council and placed on half-pay. The Colonial Secretary, Lord Knutsford, reinstated but censured him. In 1888 Onslow awarded large damages against the West Australian Newspaper for libel. The proprietors were members of the legislative council and there were further attempts to remove him. When these were unsuccessful they then attempted, unsuccessfully, to swap him, with the Chief Justice of Cyprus.	
Charles Heydon	NSW	Court of Industrial Arbitration	31 December 1918	Compulsorily retired	Judges who had been appointed at a time when there was no judicial retirement age were compulsorily retired on as a result of the Judges Retirement Act 1918 (NSW). This affected not only these 3 judges but also others such as Supreme Court judge Richard Sly and District Court judges Hugh Hamilton and Alfred Backhouse.	
Ernest Docker	NSW	District Court	31 December 1918	Compulsorily retired	Judges who had been appointed at a time when there was no judicial retirement age were compulsorily retired on as a result of the Judges Retirement Act 1918 (NSW). This affected not only these 3 judges but also others such as Supreme Court judge Richard Sly and District Court judges Hugh Hamilton and Alfred Backhouse.	
Grantley Fitzhardinge	NSW	District Court	31 December 1918	Compulsorily retired	Judges who had been appointed at a time when there was no judicial retirement age were compulsorily retired on as a result of the Judges Retirement Act 1918 (NSW). This affected not only these 3 judges but also others such as Supreme Court judge Richard Sly and District Court judges Hugh Hamilton and Alfred Backhouse.	
Pope Cooper	Qld	Supreme Court	31 March 1922	Compulsorily retired	There was animosity between the government and the judges and the parliament passed the Judges Retirement Act 1921 (Qld) which required the three judges to retire on the day it commenced.	
Patrick Real	Qld	Supreme Court	31 March 1922	Compulsorily retired	There was animosity between the government and the judges and the parliament passed the Judges Retirement Act 1921 (Qld) which required the three judges to retire on the day it commenced.	
Charles Chubb	Qld	Supreme Court	31 March 1922	Compulsorily retired	There was animosity between the government and the judges and the parliament passed the Judges Retirement Act 1921 (Qld) which required the three judges to retire on the day it commenced.	
Edward Dunphy	Commonwealth	Australian Industrial Court	1 February 1977	Removed from duties	In 1977 the jurisdiction of the Australian Industrial Court was transferred to the new Federal Court. All but two judges were appointed to the new court. The security of tenure of the remaining judges, Dunphy and Joske, was protected however they had little judicial work to do. Joske retired at the end of 1977, however Dunphy remained despite pressure from parliament for him to retire. Dunphy retired at the end of 1982.	
Sir Percy Joske	Commonwealth	Australian Industrial Court	1 February 1977	Removed from duties	In 1977 the jurisdiction of the Australian Industrial Court was transferred to the new Federal Court. All but two judges were appointed to the new court. The security of tenure of the remaining judges, Dunphy and Joske, was protected however they had little judicial work to do. Joske retired at the end of 1977, however Dunphy remained despite pressure from parliament for him to retire. Dunphy retired at the end of 1982.	
James Staples	Commonwealth	Australian Conciliation and Arbitration Commission	28 February 1989	Commission abolished	As a deputy president of the commission Staples had the same rank and status as a Federal Court judge. Staples was isolated within the commission and the duties he was allocated were significantly reduced from 1979. He was not allocated any duties after 1985. In 1988 legislation was enacted which abolished the commission and replaced it with the Australian Industrial Relations Commission. Staples was the only former member who was not appointed to the new commission.	
John Foord	NSW	District Court	26 September 1984	Not guilty	Foord faced two charges of attempting to pervert the course of justice in relation to charges against solicitor Morgan Ryan, however on 20 September 1985 he was found not guilty and he returned to judicial duties.	
John Foord	NSW	District Court	September 1986	Resigned on medical grounds	In September 1986 a report was published suggesting he had been lenient with clients of solicitor Morgan Ryan and he was suspended for the third time. In November 1986 he resigned due to ill health.	
Lionel Murphy	Commonwealth	High Court	July 1986	Not removed	In July 1985 Murphy was convicted of attempting to pervert the course of justice in relation to charges against solicitor Morgan Ryan, however this was quashed on appeal. On 28 April 1986 Murphy was found not guilty on a retrial. Parliament passed legislation to conduct a Parliamentary Commission of Inquiry, constituted by three retired judges, to examine "whether any conduct of the Honourable Lionel Keith Murphy has been such as to amount, in its opinion, to proved misbehaviour within the meaning of section 72 of the Constitution". In July 1986 Murphy announced he was dying of cancer and the legislation was repealed. Murphy died on 21 October 1986.	
Angelo Vasta	Qld	Supreme Court	8 June 1989	Removed	The allegations against Justice Vasta were not in relation to his conduct as a judicial officer, but rather that (a) he had given false evidence at a defamation hearing; (b) making and maintaining allegations that the then Chief Justice, Sir Dormer Andrews, Attorney-General Paul Clauson and Tony Fitzgerald QC had conspired to injure him; and (c) income tax avoidance. He was removed by the Governor following a motion being passed by the parliament.	
Eric Pratt	Qld	District Court	20 July 1989	Not removed	The inquiry centered around whether his decisions in the Police Complaints Tribunal were influenced by his friendship with the then Police Commissioner Terry Lewis who was later convicted of corruption. Lewis had also lobbied to have Pratt elevated to the Supreme Court. He was cleared of any impropriety, the government paid his costs and he returned to judicial duties.	
Barry Wooldridge	NSW	Local Court	September 1993	Retired	The Judicial Commission report in March 1993 concluded that Wooldridge could be removed on the ground of incapacity. No action was taken in parliament prior to his retirement in September 1993.	
Vince Bruce	NSW	Supreme Court	25 June 1998	Not removed	A report by the Judicial Commission, delivered on 15 May 1998, was critical of his performance as a judge, particularly the delay in delivering judgments. On 25 June 1998 the New South Wales Legislative Council voted 24 to 16 not to remove him. Justice Bruce resigned on 8 March 1999 after the outstanding judgments had been delivered.	
Ian McDougall	NSW	Local Court	1998	Resigned	The Judicial Commission found that parliament could remove McDougall as being incapable of performing his judicial duties by reason of mental illness. The other 15 allegations could be seen as the product of that mental illness. The magistrate's 2nd resignation was accepted after the Judicial Commission report was tabled in parliament.	
Robert Kent	Vic	County Court	2001	Resigned	Kent was convicted of failing to submit tax returns prior to his appointment. An inquiry was arranged to consider whether to remove him as a judge however he resigned before it was conducted.	
Peter Liddy	SA	Magistrates Court	2001	Resigned	Liddy was convicted of child sex offences but resigned without the need for an inquiry	
Deborah Bennett-Borlase	WA	Magistrates Court	2001	Retired	Bennett-Borlase had lied about her age and continued to work 3 years past mandatory the retirement age of 65. As Bennett-Borlase was over 65 she was automatically removed	
Diane Fingleton	Qld	Chief Magistrate Magistrates Court	2002	Removed & reappointed	Fingleton was convicted of intimidation of a witness in 2002 however the conviction was quashed by the High Court in 2005, and she was reappointed as a magistrate	
Jeff Shaw	NSW	Supreme Court	2004	Resigned	Shaw crashed his car and was suspected of drink driving. A blood sample was taken in hospital but Shaw ended up with both samples. Shaw resigned after he was found to be four times over the legal limit saying he was not well enough to discharge the duties of his office. The Police Integrity Commission conducted an inquiry into how he came to have the police sample however the Director of Public Prosecutions declined to charge Shaw with perverting the course of justice or giving false evidence.	
Ian Dodd	NSW	District Court	July 2005	Retired on medical grounds	The Judicial Commission was conducting an investigation however before its report was complete, a medical assessment found Dodd was unfit to work as a judicial officer and he retired on medical grounds.	
Carmen Randazzo	Vic	Magistrates Court	25 June 2009	Resigned	Randazzo's car was detected speeding and she said that her father was driving the car. It was alleged that her father was overseas at the time. Police did not charge Randazzo with any offence however the Attorney-General announced a judicial panel would consider whether she should be removed, however she immediately resigned.	
Ron Cahill	ACT	Chief Magistrate Magistrates Court	17 November 2009	Resigned	A commission was established to consider an allegation that Cahill had interfered with another Magistrate’s conduct of criminal proceedings relating to a figure known professionally and socially to Cahill, however he resigned before the commission was conducted.	
Raffaele Barberio	Vic	Magistrates Court	April 2010	Resigned	Barberio was stood down after he was arrested and charged with criminal offences. He subsequently pleaded guilty to assault and criminal damage and resigned.	
Unknown	WA	Magistrates Court	June 2011	No action taken	The WA chief magistrate received a complaint that prior to Ms Nuic's suicide, the 22-year-old Legal Aid lawyer was "berated" by a magistrate in court. The Attorney-General considered there was a lack of unequivocal evidence of incompetence, negligence or misbehaviour.	
Jennifer Betts	NSW	Local Court	15 June 2011	Not removed	The Judicial Commission found that parliament could remove Betts on the grounds of both misbehavior in relation to her rude, belligerent and insulting conduct on the bench and incapacity related to her depression and failure to take prescribed medication. On 15 June 2011 the New South Wales Legislative Council voted not to remove her.	
Brian Maloney	NSW	Local Court	13 October 2011	Not removed	The Judicial Commission found that the complaints against Maloney were substantially caused by his bipolar II disorder and parliament could remove the magistrate on the grounds of incapacity. On 13 October 2011 the New South Wales Legislative Council voted 22 to 15 not to remove him.	
Garry Neilson	NSW	District Court	24 September 2015	Inappropriate conduct not warranting removal	Neilson was stood down for his directions to a jury in a trial of a man accused of raping his sister, which included that "a jury might find nothing untoward in the advance of a brother towards his sister once she had sexually matured, had sexual relationships with other men and was now 'available', not having [a] sexual partner". The Judicial Commission found that the comments undermined confidence in the judiciary, and amounted to inappropriate judicial conduct. The Commission did not find there were grounds for his removal and recommended to Chief Judge Derek Price that Neilson not be allocated to sit on cases involving sexual offences.	
Greg Borchers	NT	Local Court	8 December 2017	Inappropriate conduct but not misconduct	The judges remarks on sentencing a 13 year old boy included that he had taken advantage of the absence of parental control, in circumstances where his mother had died in violent circumstances and his father was in prison having been charged with her murder. Chief Judge Lowndes found that some of the remarks were harsh and misguided, and amounted to inappropriate judicial conduct, but that they fell well short of judicial misconduct.	
Raj Malhotra	Vic	Magistrates' Court	2 August 2018	Resigned	Malhotra was stood down from his role as a Magistrate after referral of allegations of misconduct to an investigating panel of the Judicial Commission of Victoria, including that he sexually assaulted a woman at a Christmas party in 2017 and incited violence against a male staff member. Malhotra resigned from office, resulting in the referral being dismissed (as the Commission had no power to conduct its investigation after the resignation).	
Dominique Burns	NSW	Local Court	19 November 2018	Resigned	Burns was appointed in February 2015 and was suspended from duty from June 2017. In November 2018 the Judicial Commission conducted a public hearing into allegations that Burns had misused her powers to detain people prior to trial, had denied procedural fairness and encouraged prosecutors to charge a defendant with additional offences. Burns' defence was that the mistakes had to be examined in light of a crushing workload and that her mental health was an explanation for her conduct. The Judicial Commission found that 16 out of 17 matters were substantiated and concluded that Parliament could consider removing her from office. Burns resigned before Parliament considered the report.	
Richard Pithouse	Vic	Magistrates' Court	2 January 2019	improper conduct not warranting removal	In 2018, Pithouse was reported to have said to a woman who alleged she had been sexually assaulted that she had "put herself in that position" and had suffered "buyer's remorse". Jill Hennessy, the Attorney-General, referred the allegations to the Judicial Commission to investigate. The commission found that his conduct was improper but did not warrant his removal. He was referred to the Chief Magistrate for counseling, coaching and education. In late 2022, Pithouse was again the subject of complaints to the Judicial Commission, this time in relation to "unnecessarily aggressive behaviour" towards a defendant, and alleged unprofessional and inappropriate communications with a junior lawyer that "could be characterised as sexual harassment". Pithouse was stood down in February 2023, and resigned in March 2023 without any findings made by the Commission.	
Peter Maiden	NSW	District Court	26 March 2019	Parliament may consider removing. Resigned	In February 2017 Maiden was referred to the Judicial Commission because of delays in delivering 13 judgments. After a lengthy investigation, the Conduct Division concluded that it had no confidence that Maiden would be able to deliver reserved judgments in a timely fashion, holding that his capacity and conduct was such that the parliament could consider removing him as a judge. Maiden resigned on 11 July 2019, before Parliament considered the report.	
Sara Hinchey	Vic	Coroners Court	8 April 2019	No misconduct	Hinchey was the subject of 92 complaints to the Judicial Commission. After a preliminary investigation 87 of the complaints were dismissed, while 4 were referred to the Chief Judge of the County Court for counselling to occur. The allegation that Hinchey had removed alcohol purchased using Coroners Court funds for personal use was referred to an investigating panel, which was dismissed in August 2019. Despite being cleared, Hinchey resigned as Chief Coroner, but remained a judge of the County Court.	
Greg Borchers	NT	Local Court	1 December 2019	improper conduct not warranting removal	A complaint was made by the Criminal Lawyers Association of the NT that Judge Borchers had made racist remarks to defendants and bullying conduct towards lawyers. These included telling a defendant that "Yesterday probably was pension day, so you got your money from the Government, abandoned your kids in that great Indigenous fashion of abrogating your parental responsibility to another member of your family, and went off and got drunk" and that a man who had assaulted his partner acted "just like a primitive person dragging his woman out of the cave". Chief Judge Elizabeth Morris found that Borchers had made improper comments containing negative racial stereotypes that went "beyond the proper bounds of denunciation in sentencing". The Chief Judge found that the judge did not exercise the restraint, courtesy and civility required of a judicial officer. The Chief Judge said it was inappropriate for her to make a formal determination because there was no formal complaints process in the Northern Territory, but in her opinion the judge's conduct did not warrant his removal.	
Graeme Curran	NSW	Local Court	21 April 2021	Resigned	Curran was charged with indecent assault in 2017 and suspended from the local court bench while those criminal charges were before the courts. He was convicted of seven counts of indecent assault against a teenage boy, an appeal to the Court of Criminal Appeal quashed two of the convictions. An application for special leave to appeal to the High Court was dismissed and he resigned the following week.	
Joe Harman	Commonwealth	Federal Circuit Court	8 July 2021	Resigned	Harman was accused of sexually harassing two young women who worked for the court at Parramatta. Harmen took leave from August 2020 while an inquiry was conducted by former judges Julie Dodds-Streeton QC, David Habersberger QC and Katharine Williams QC. In April 2021 the inquiry reported that the complaints were substantiated and recommended that the complaints be referred to Michaelia Cash, the Attorney-General. Harman submitted further medical evidence, which did not alter the findings or recommendation. Harman subsequently resigned.	
