= First Griffith ministry =

The First Griffith Ministry was a ministry of the Government of Queensland and was led by Premier Samuel Griffith. It succeeded the First McIlwraith Ministry on 13 November 1883 after the latter lost the 1883 election. It was succeeded by the Second McIlwraith Ministry on 13 June 1888 after itself losing the 1888 election.

== The ministry ==
On 13 November 1883, the Governor, Sir Anthony Musgrave, designated 6 principal executive offices of the Government, and appointed the following Members of the Parliament of Queensland to the Ministry as follows:

Office	Minister
Premier; Colonial Secretary	Samuel Griffith, MLA
Colonial Treasurer	James Dickson, MLA (until 17 August 1887); Samuel Griffith, MLA (from 17 August 1887)
Attorney-General	Arthur Rutledge, MLA
Secretary for Public Lands	Charles Dutton, MLA (until 30 August 1887); Henry Jordan, MLA (from 30 August 1887)
Secretary for Public Works; Secretary for Mines	William Miles, MLA (until 22 August 1887); Charles Dutton, MLA (from 30 August 1887)
Secretary for Public Instruction	Samuel Griffith, MLA (until 3 January 1885); Charles Mein, MLC (3 January 1885 – 17 April 1885); Berkeley Basil Moreton, MLA (from 17 April 1885)
Postmaster-General	James Garrick, MLC (until 24 June 1884); Charles Mein, MLC (24 June 1884 – 3 January 1885); Richard Bingham Sheridan, MLA (3 January 1885 – 17 February 1885); Samuel Griffith, MLA (17 February 1885 – 17 March 1885); Berkeley Basil Moreton, MLA (17 March 1885 – 22 April 1885); Thomas MacDonald-Paterson, MLC (22 April 1885 – 17 August 1887); Walter Wilson (from 17 August 1887)
Representative of Government in the Legislative Council	James Garrick, MLC (until 24 June 1884); Charles Mein, MLC (24 June 1884 – 3 January 1885); Thomas Macdonald-Paterson, MLC (3 January 1885 – 17 August 1887); Walter Wilson (from 17 August 1887)
Minister without portfolio	Richard Bingham Sheridan, MLA (until 3 January 1885)

Preceded by McIlwraith Ministry	Griffith Ministry; 1883–1888	Succeeded by McIlwraith Ministry
