= First McIlwraith ministry =

The First McIlwraith Ministry was a ministry of the Government of Queensland and was led by Premier Thomas McIlwraith. It succeeded the Douglas Ministry on 21 January 1879 after the latter lost a vote of no confidence in Parliament after the 1878 election. It was in turn succeeded by the First Griffith Ministry on 13 November 1883 after losing the 1883 election.

== First ministry ==
On 21 January 1879, the Governor, Sir Arthur Edward Kennedy, designated 6 principal executive offices of the Government, and appointed the following Members of the Parliament of Queensland to the Ministry as follows:

Office	Minister
Premier; Colonial Treasurer (until 24 December 1881); Colonial Secretary (from 24 December 1881)	Thomas McIlwraith, MLA
Colonial Secretary; Secretary for Public Instruction	Arthur Hunter Palmer, MLA (until 24 December 1881)
Colonial Treasurer; Secretary for Public Instruction	Archibald Archer, MLA (from 5 January 1882)
Secretary for Public Works; Secretary for Mines	John Murtagh Macrossan, MLA^{[1]} (until 13 March 1883); Albert Norton, MLA (from 13 March 1883)
Attorney-General	John Malbon Thompson, MLA (until 16 May 1879); Ratcliff Pring, MLA^{[2]} (16 May 1879 — 4 June 1880); Henry Beor, MLA (4 June 1880 — 25 December 1880); Pope Alexander Cooper, MLA (31 December 1880 — 5 January 1883); Charles Chubb, MLA (from 5 January 1883)
Secretary for Public Lands	Patrick Perkins, MLA
Postmaster-General; Representative of Government in the Legislative Council	Charles Hardie Buzacott, MLC (until 17 December 1880); Boyd Dunlop Morehead, MLC (from 17 December 1880)

^{1} Macrossan did not hold a seat at the time of his appointment; however, the member for Electoral district of Townsville resigned and Macrossan was seated in the Assembly on 4 March 1879.
^{2} Pring lost his seat at a ministerial by-election on 29 May 1879 but continued as Attorney-General without a seat.

Preceded by Douglas Ministry	McIlwraith Ministry; 1879–1883	Succeeded by Griffith Ministry
