= Electoral district of Bowen =

Former state electoral district of Queensland, Australia

Bowen Queensland—Legislative Assembly
- State: Queensland
- Dates current: 1873–1950, 1960–1971, 1986–1992
- Namesake: Bowen, Queensland

Bowen was an electoral district of the Legislative Assembly in the Australian state of Queensland from 1873 to 1950 and at various times until 1992.

== History ==
The electoral district of Bowen was established by the 1872 Electoral Districts Act.

During the First McIlwraith Ministry, the seat of Bowen was occupied by three Attorneys-General: Henry Beor, Pope Alexander Cooper and Charles E. Chubb. Upon Beor's death, Cooper, who was not at that time in Parliament, was appointed Attorney-General and contested and won the resulting by-election. When he resigned, Chubb entered parliament in the same manner.

Bowen is the only state or federal electorate in Australia to elect a Communist member, Fred Paterson, who served as member for Bowen from the 1944 election until the 1950 election.

In a 1949 redistribution, Bowen was abolished, being split between the new electoral districts of Burdekin and Whitsunday. It has been suggested that the redistribution was done deliberately to split Paterson's electoral support and prevent him from being returned to parliament in the 1950 election. Paterson contested Whitsunday but was unsuccessful.

From 1963 until 1971, member Peter Delamothe also served as Attorney-General.

Today, the electoral districts of Whitsunday and Burdekin comprise parts of the former Electoral district of Bowen.

== Members ==
First incarnation (1873–1950)
Member	Party	Term
Thomas Henry FitzGerald		1873–1875
Francis Amhurst		1875–1877
Henry Beor	Conservative	1877–1880
Pope Alexander Cooper	Conservative	1881–1883
Charles E. Chubb	Conservative	1883–1888
Robert Smith	Conservative	1888–1890
Robert Smith	Ministerial	1890–1902
Francis Kenna	Labor	1902–1907
Francis Kenna	Kidstonites	1907–1908
Francis Kenna	Independent Opposition	1908–1909
Myles Ferricks	Labor	1909–1912
Edwin Caine	Liberal	1912–1915
Charles Collins	Labor	1915–1936
Ernest Riordan	Labor	1936–1944
Fred Paterson	Communist	1944–1950
Second incarnation (1960–1971)
Peter Delamothe	Liberal	1960–1971
Third incarnation (1986–1992)
Ken Smyth	Labor	1986–1992

== See also ==
- Electoral districts of Queensland
- Members of the Queensland Legislative Assembly by year
- Category:Members of the Queensland Legislative Assembly by name
