= Court of summary jurisdiction =

A court of summary jurisdiction can mean any court that exercises summary jurisdiction:

- usually, a magistrates' court
- or, very specifically, the Court of Summary Jurisdiction (Northern Territory of Australia)
