= Patrick Real =

Australian judge

Patrick Real (17 March 1846 – 10 June 1928) was a Supreme Court judge in Queensland, a colony and later a state of Australia.

== Early life ==
Caricature by David Low

Real was born in Pallas Green, County Limerick, Ireland, the youngest and sixth child of James Real, tenant farmer, and his wife Ellen, née Donegan. Real was taken to Australia as a young child in 1850. His father died at the Dunwich Quarantine Station, and his mother settled in Ipswich, Queensland, where he was apprenticed to a carpenter. Subsequently he was employed in the Ipswich railway workshops until, at the age of twenty-one, he formed the idea of becoming a barrister.

== Legal career ==
Relinquishing his trade, he devoted himself to study. He was admitted to the Queensland Bar in September 1874 and practised with success. In February 1878 he was appointed Crown Prosecutor for the Central District of Queensland and, on the death of Justice Charles Mein in 1890, a Puisne Judge. In 1903 when Pope Cooper was appointed Chief Justice, Real was appointed Senior Puisne Judge. There was animosity between the Labor government and the judges, playing out through a series of cases challenging government actions and legislation. The parliament undermined his security of tenure by passing the Judges Retirement Act 1921 (Qld), the effect of which was that immediately upon proclamation three out of six judges, Chief Justice Cooper and Justices Real and Chubb were compulsorily retired, which permitted the government to appoint new judges.

== Family ==
Real married Anne Catharine Thynne, sister of Andrew Joseph Thynne, in January 1879, at Ipswich. He and Anne had four children, three daughters, and a son: Ellen, Mary Josephine, Kathleen, and Edward Thynne. The two eldest children, however, did not survive infancy, dying aged 10 months, and 4 months, respectively. His son was Edward Thynne Real, KC, leader of the Queensland bar.

== Later life ==
After his retirement as a judge, aged 76, Real practised as a consulting barrister, without great success. Real died in 1928 and was buried in Toowong Cemetery.

== Legacy ==
His home Eulalia in Norman Park was listed on the Queensland Heritage Register.
