= Eulalia, Norman Park =

Eulalia
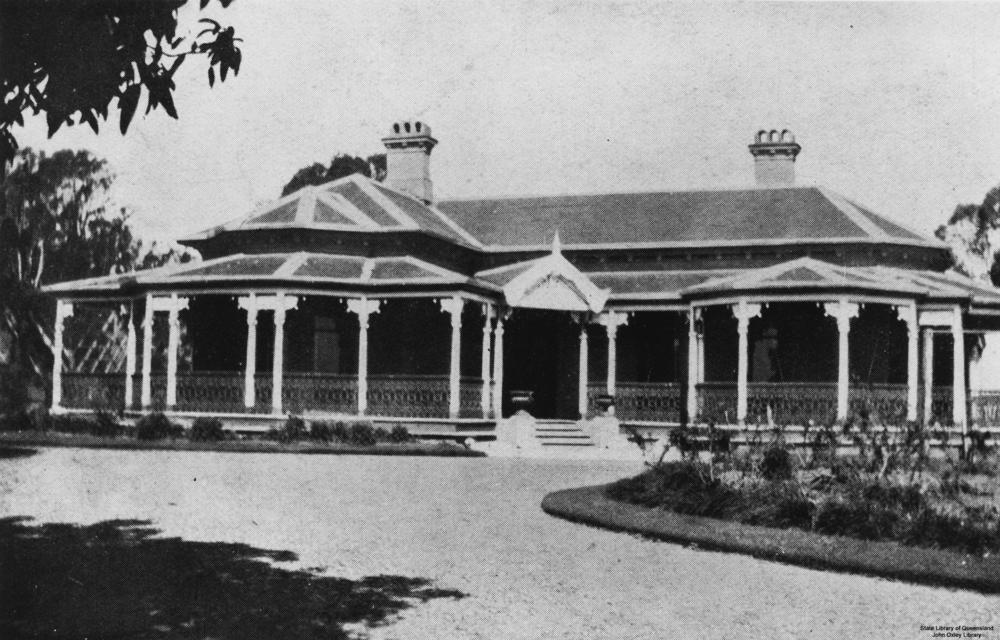
- Eulalia, 1932

- Location within Queensland Location within Australia
- 27.4852°S 153.0682°E
- Location: 75 McIllwraith Avenue, Norman Park, Queensland, Australia

History
- Design period: 1870s–1890s (late 19th century)
- Built: 1889

Queensland Heritage Register
- Official name: Eulalia
- Type: state heritage (landscape, built)
- Designated: 21 October 1992
- Reference no.: 600269
- Significant period: 1880s (fabric); 1880–1920s (historical)
- Significant components: garden/grounds, croquet lawn, service wing, carriage way/drive, cellar, trees/plantings, tank stand, lead light/s, garden – coral, residential accommodation – main house

Eulalia is a heritage-listed villa at 75 McIllwraith Avenue, Norman Park, Queensland, Australia. It was built in 1889. It was added to the Queensland Heritage Register on 21 October 1992.

== History ==
Eulalia is a single-storeyed brick house which was constructed in 1889. The land on which the house stands was first bought by August Dimper who purchased 88 acres (36 ha) in 1860. In 1888, the land was further subdivided and 22 acres (8.9 ha) was purchased by Patrick Real.

In the following year Real employed Brisbane architects, John Hall & Sons to design a house for the site and Morley Whitehead of Ipswich were subsequently contracted to build Eulalia, a Greek word meaning speaking well of everybody. At this period, John Smith Murdoch was employed in the office of John Hall and Sons and it is possible that he may have been the designer for Eulalia.

Patrick Real was the son of impoverished Irish emigrants and left school at twelve to become an apprentice carpenter and later to work at the North Ipswich Railway Workshops. After deciding on a legal career, he studied law and was admitted to the bar at the age of twenty-seven. By the time he built Eulalia in 1889, his practice was one of the largest in Queensland. Real was appointed to the Supreme Court of Queensland bench in 1890 and in 1903 he became Senior Puisne Judge. He retired in 1922 and died in 1928.

After Real's death, the house was closed and left vacant for a decade during which time it fell victim to vandals and the weather, becoming known locally as the haunted house. Most of the land had been subdivided and sold by 1925 leaving a property of about 2.2 hectares (5.4 acres) surrounding the house.

In 1938 Eulalia was bought by Stanley and Sheilah Hancock who restored the property, discovering many items in the gardens where they had been discarded by vandals, and re-instating them in the house.

The Hancock family first arrived in Queensland when they moved from Sydney to Ipswich in the late 1850s. The family established a successful timber milling business which involved five generations of the Hancock family and continued until the late 1970s. Stanley Hancock was president of the National Trust of Queensland from 1974 to 1978. This was a period when a number of National Trust of Queensland properties were established including Bellevue Homestead, Claremont and Brennan & Geraghtys Store.

Whilst Eulalia was a family home for the Hancocks, they also used it as a venue for fundraising functions for a number of Brisbane charities.

This "public" use of Eulalia was further expanded in 1965, when the Hancocks established Early Street Historical Village in the grounds of Eulalia. The establishment of the Village is the earliest known example of the Queensland practice of creating "historical villages" by moving various buildings to one central site. It is therefore demonstrative of the development of conservation practice and theory in Queensland.

Early Street Historical Village closed in 1998 having reached "the end of its life in terms of public appreciation". The other buildings on the site were auctioned off; most were relocated to outer suburban sites for use as housing.

== Description ==
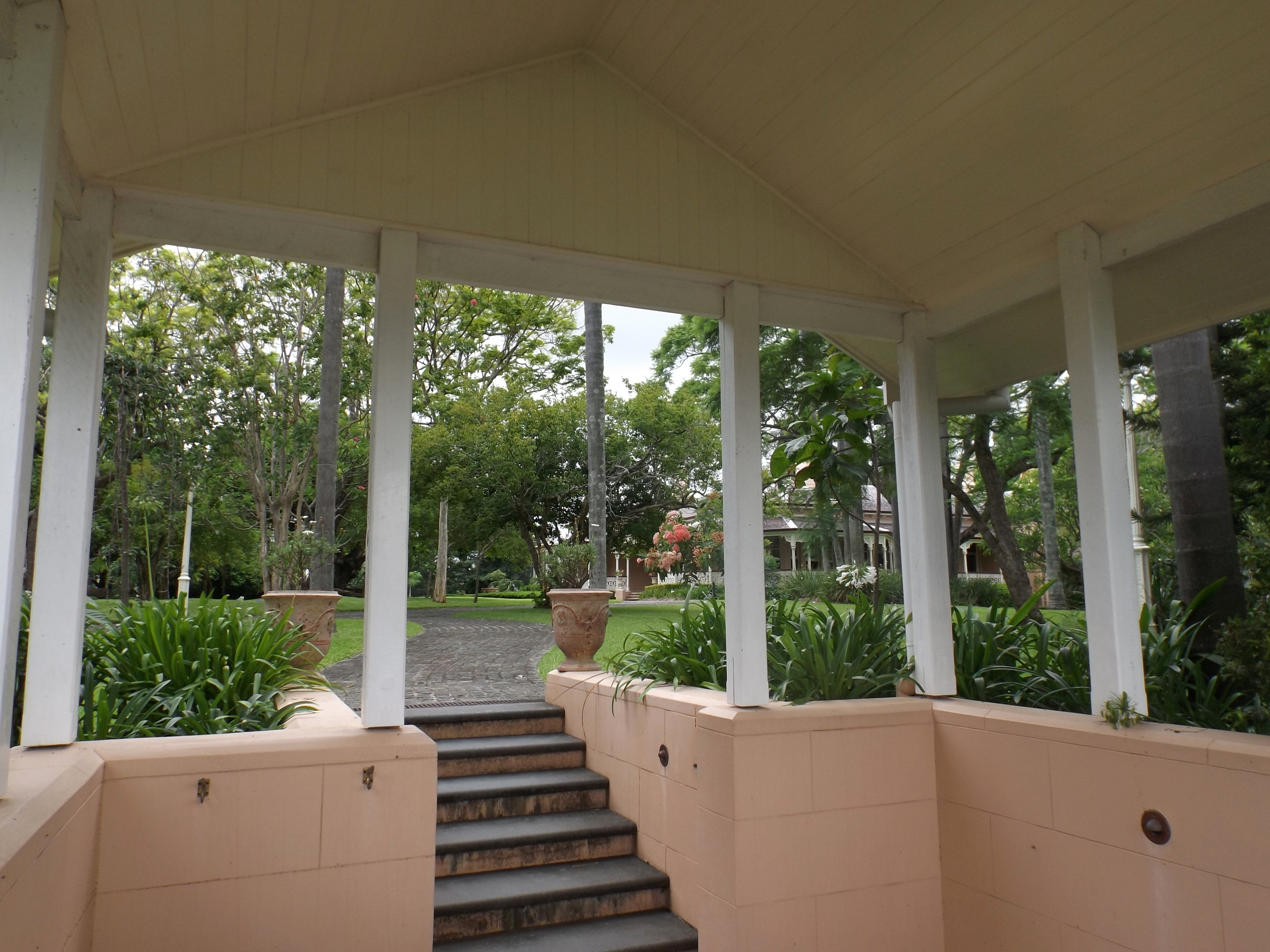
Pedestrian entrance and gardens, 2015

Built on a prominent hill with expansive views, Eulalia is a single-storeyed house with two rear wings, rendered brick walls and a hipped slate roof.

The entire block on which Eulalia and the adjacent Early Street Historical Village are located is planted with mature gums, palm trees, bunya pines, jacarandas and bougainvillea and many other species, making it a dominant landmark in an otherwise typical suburban setting and one of the few surviving examples of mature planting in the area. These plantings are also instrumental in conveying an impression of the original semi-rural setting of Eulalia.

Associated structures on the site include a tank stand and a substantially modified coach house.

The house faces north and comprises a pedimented entrance porch leading onto a wide verandah, flanked by two projecting bays. The verandah continues around three sides of the house, featuring a cast iron balustrade separated by tapered octagonal timber posts with decorative capitals and fretwork brackets. The principal timber is beech.

Tessellated floor tiles continue from the slate steps at the porch through the entry and into the wide hallway. The main door is panelled, with leaded glass sidelights and an etched fanlight featuring gum leaves, a swallow and a dragonfly. A similarly lit doorway is located at the opposite end of the hall. On the right of the hallway are separate drawing and dining rooms, the former incorporating a window bay with Doric fluted columns and pilasters on either side, and the latter a set of cedar folding doors which can be folded back to create one large area incorporating the hallway. On the left of the hall are the master bed, dressing and sitting rooms.

Joinery throughout the house is of cedar, including architraves and pedimented overdoors which reach almost to the plaster cornice of sixteen feet high ceilings. The ornate drawing room mantelpiece is of a mahogany, whilst others are of oak. The long sash windows which open from the main rooms onto the verandah feature hinged dog-doors at floor level. At the end of the hall, the house divides into two wings, one dowel-balustraded verandah on the left leading to the bathroom and two bedrooms, and the other on the right to the former study and service rooms including a kitchen, pantry, maid's room and laundry. A large cellar is located beneath this wing.

== Heritage listing ==
Eulalia was listed on the Queensland Heritage Register on 21 October 1992 having satisfied the following criteria.

The place is important in demonstrating the evolution or pattern of Queensland's history.

Constructed in 1889, Eulalia and its grounds are important for the evidence they provide of the way of life of prosperous citizens in the outer reaches of Brisbane in the late nineteenth century.

The place is important in demonstrating the principal characteristics of a particular class of cultural places.

The house is important as an example of a fine quality 1880s Queensland residence of masonry construction that is substantially intact, both externally and internally. It is also an uncommon example of a 19th-century residence still located in substantial grounds which separate it from the surrounding suburban development. The grounds and gardens, which contain mature plantings including gums, palm trees, bunya pines, jacarandas and bougainvillea contribute to the overall integrity of the place.

The place is important because of its aesthetic significance.

It has several rare and highly decorative architectural features, including the verandahs surrounding the bay windows and their finely detailed verandah posts and brackets. These features, combined with the fine quality of interior finishes and fittings, including cedar joinery, internal pilasters and columns, and flooring of tessellated tiles give Eulalia considerable aesthetic significance.

The place has a strong or special association with a particular community or cultural group for social, cultural or spiritual reasons.

Its prominent location and mature plantings ensure that the entire site is a significant landmark in the area.

The place has a special association with the life or work of a particular person, group or organisation of importance in Queensland's history.

Eulalia is significant for its association with its first owner, the Hon. Patrick Real Senior who was a prominent Brisbane lawyer and Puisne Judge in the early 1890s and is perpetuated in the surrounding streets, including Judge, Patrick and Real Streets. Katherine Street is named after a family member.

It is also significant for its association with its second owner, Stanley Hancock who was President of the National Trust of Queensland from 1974 to 1978, and was influential in the early conservation of Queensland's heritage.

Eulalia also has strong association with the adjacent Early Street Historical Village, established in 1965 in conjunction with the house by the Hancocks as the first known heritage property in Queensland to be promoted as a tourist and educational attraction.
