= Francis Amhurst =

Australian politician

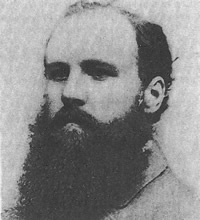

Member of the Queensland Legislative Assembly for Bowen
- In office 26 May 1875 – 24 March 1877
- Preceded by: Thomas FitzGerald
- Succeeded by: Henry Beor

Member of the Queensland Legislative Assembly for Mackay
- In office 21 November 1878 – 3 January 1881
- Preceded by: New seat
- Succeeded by: Maurice Black

Personal details
- Born: Francis Tyssen Amhurst; 27 September 1842 Framlingham, Suffolk, England
- Died: 3 January 1881 (aged 38) Died at sea on board the SS Bokhara en route to England
- Education: Christ Church, Oxford
- Occupation: Solicitor, Sugar Plantation owner

Francis Tyssen Amhurst (27 September 1842 – 3 January 1881) was a solicitor and Member of the Queensland Legislative Assembly.

== Early life ==
Francis Amhurst was born in Framlingham, Suffolk, in 1842 to William Amhurst and his wife Mary (née Fountaine) . He attended Eton College and went on to Christ Church University, Oxford. He travelled overseas for two years after completing University and arrived in Queensland 1872. He set up buying various investments and by 1875 he was owner of Foulden Sugar Plantation in Mackay.

== Politics ==
Winning the seat of Bowen in 1875, Amhurst held the seat for two years before resigning in 1877. The next year he contested and won Mackay, holding it till his death in 1881.

== Death ==
Before his death, Amhurst had been in poor health. Hoping a change would help him recuperate, he sailed on the SS Bokhara bound for England, but died at sea on 3 January 1881.

Parliament of Queensland
Preceded by Thomas FitzGerald	Member for Bowen; 1875–1877	Succeeded by Henry Beor
New seat	Member for Mackay; 1878–1881	Succeeded by Maurice Black
