= Magistrates' court =

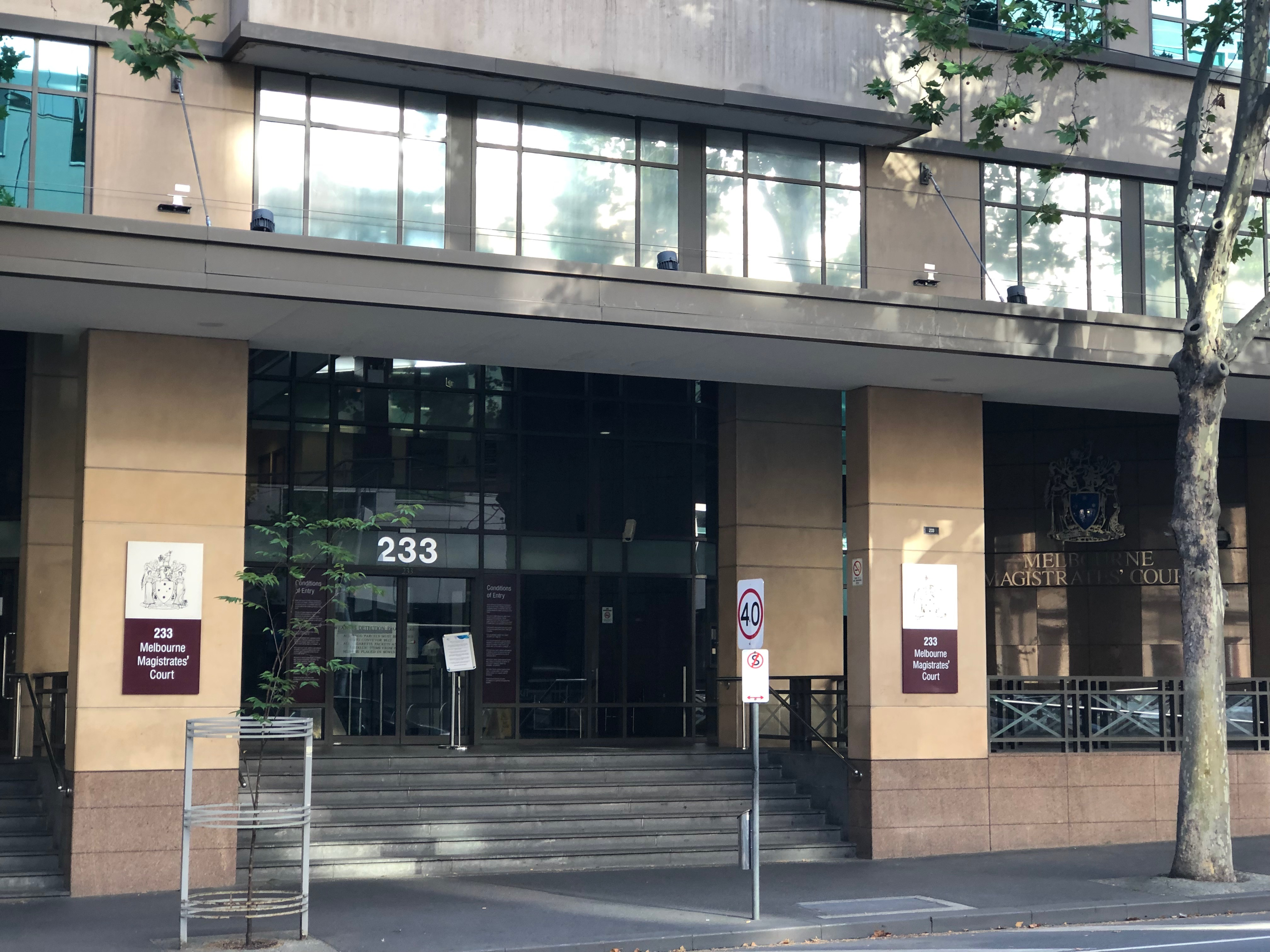
The Melbourne Magistrates' Court, the principal venue of the Magistrates' Court of Victoria

A magistrates' court is a lower court where, in several jurisdictions, all criminal proceedings start. Some civil matters may also be dealt with here, such as family proceedings.

== Courts ==
- Magistrates' court (England and Wales)
- Magistrates' court (Hong Kong)
- District Court (Ireland), the main court of summary jurisdiction in Ireland
- Magistrate's courts of Israel
- Magistrate's Court of Jersey
- Magistrates' Court (Kenya)
- District Court (New Zealand), replaced magistrate's courts in 1980
- Magistrate's court (Russia)
- Magistrate's court (South Africa)
- Magistrate's court (Sri Lanka)
- Magistrate court (West Virginia)

=== Australian courts ===
- Magistrates Court of the Australian Capital Territory
- Magistrates court (Northern Territory)
- Magistrates Court of Queensland
- Magistrates Court of South Australia
- Magistrates Court of Tasmania
- Magistrates' Court of Victoria
- Magistrates Court of Western Australia
- Local Court of New South Wales
- Federal Circuit Court of Australia (initially the Federal Magistrate's Court of Australia. The title Federal Magistrate was changed to Judge at the same time.)

== Other ==
- Magistrates' Courts Act 1952 of the United Kingdom
- Magistrates' Courts Act 1980 of the United Kingdom
- Magistrate's Court (TV series)
- Liverpool Magistrates' Court, a court building
- Bow Street Magistrates' Court
- City of Westminster Magistrates' Court

== See also ==
- Magistrate
- Lower court
- Court of summary jurisdiction
