= James Blair (Australian judge) =

Australian politician, lawyer and judge

Sir James Blair KCMG
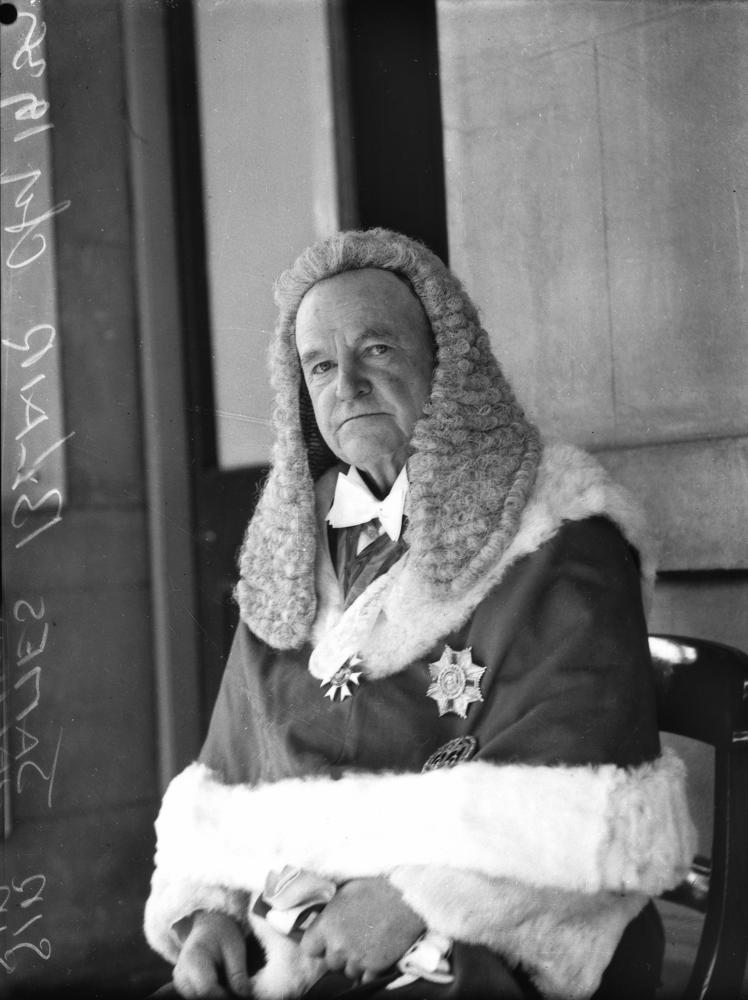
- James William Blair in 1939

Member of the Queensland Legislative Assembly for Ipswich
- In office 11 March 1902 – 22 May 1915 Serving with Thomas Cribb, William Maughan
- Preceded by: Alfred Stephenson
- Succeeded by: David Gledson

6th Chief Justice of Queensland
- In office 24 April 1925 – 16 May 1940
- Preceded by: Thomas McCawley
- Succeeded by: Hugh Denis Macrossan

Personal details
- Born: James William Blair; 16 May 1870 Ipswich, Queensland, Australia
- Died: 18 November 1944 (aged 74) Brisbane, Queensland, Australia
- Resting place: Balmoral Cemetery
- Party: Ministerial
- Other political affiliations: Opposition, Kidstonites
- Spouse: May Christina Gibson (m.1912 d.1966)
- Occupation: Judge, Chief Justice

Sir James William Blair KCMG (16 May 1870 – 18 November 1944) was an Australian politician, lawyer and judge. He was a successful politician, being elected to the Queensland Parliament on several occasions. He held the office of Attorney-General of Queensland and was also the Minister for Mines and introduced many successful law reforms measures in Queensland. In later life, he took up an appointment as a judge of the Supreme Court of Queensland and went on to become the Chief Justice of that court. Blair took on many civic roles including that of Chancellor of the University of Queensland.

His biographer states that Blair was thought of as a "dandy" because he wore a white gardenia in his coat buttonhole and a silk handkerchief protruding from his breast pocket. Blair was said to be witty, possess a delightful personality, a gift of speech, and a love of humour, although author Frank Hardy is accused of referring to Blair as "venal" through veiled references in the book "Power Without Glory".

== Early years ==
Blair was born at Coalfalls, Ipswich, Queensland on 16 May 1870. He was the son of Gordon Blair and Julie Blair (née Droughton). He was first educated by his mother but he later attended Ipswich West State School. He later attended Ipswich Grammar School between 1882 and 1888. He read for the preliminary Queensland Bar examinations in Brisbane. Blair lived at Swanwick's in Norman Park at the time and was called to the Queensland Bar on 6 March 1894.

Blair shared chambers with the Queensland Attorney General of the time, Thomas Joseph Byrnes. Blair appeared as junior counsel in many significant cases. One of those was the appeal to the Full Court of the Supreme Court of Queensland by Patrick Kenniff and James Kenniff. Both had been convicted of murdering a property owner and a police constable after the homestead they were staying in was burnt to the ground. The appeal did not succeed and Patrick Kenniff was executed soon after and his brother went on to serve a gaol term.

== Political career ==
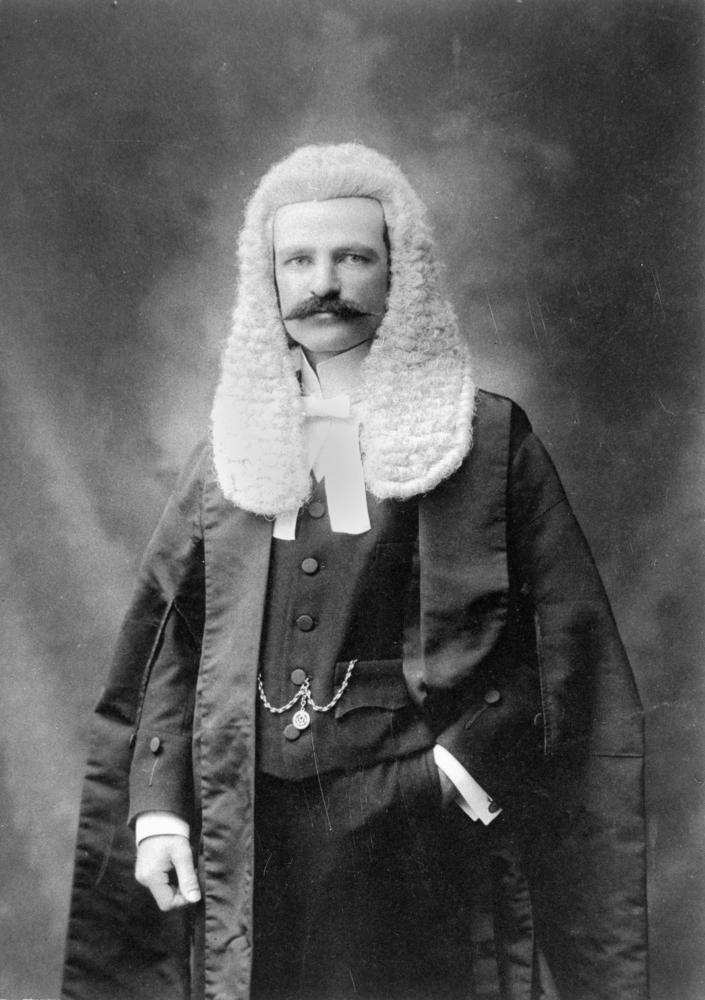
Judge Blair

Blair's association with Byrnes led to his interest in politics. Blair contested the 1902 Queensland state election as an independent candidate for Ipswich. He was one of two elected to represent Ipswich in that election. Blair captured the hearts of the electorate by putting up heart shaped signs saying "Give Jimmy a vote" or "In the hearts of the people". In the Queensland Legislative Assembly, he opposed Sunday trading for pubs and hotels, restricted hours for bars, prohibition of the sale of tobacco to children and the stringent enforcement against gambling. He also sought the takeover of private schools by the Government and the provision of more scholarships after their takeover.

In 1903, at the age of 33, Blair was invited to become Attorney-General of Queensland after Sir Arthur Morgan became Premier of Queensland after the Liberal-Labour coalition victory. One of Blair's first acts was to abolish the office of sheriff. This led to the sacking of Arthur Hoey Davis (also known as author Steele Rudd). This led to many vicious personal attacks on Blair in Steele Rudd's Magazine. The office of sheriff was quickly restored when it was realized how much the sheriff actually did. In 1904, Blair additionally became the Minister for Mines. In 1905, Blair introduced the Worker's Compensation Act 1905 (Qld), a major change to workplace safety laws in Queensland. Previous efforts at reform in this area had stalled and this legislation changed the focus from the regulation of safety to instead requiring employers to compensate employees for workplace accidents. He introduced the Children's Court Act 1907 (Qld) providing for the first specialized children's courts in Queensland. These courts were a great success. These specialized children's courts continue to exist in modern times. However, he was unable to gather support for changes to mining laws or to education. As joint editor, he published an annotated version of the Workers Compensation legislation in 1906. He also jointed revised the "Queensland Police Code and Justices' Manual of the Criminal Law" written by Robert Archibald Ranking. He continued in his executive offices after William Kidston became Premier in 1906. He lost those offices in 1907 when Sir Robert Philp became Premier, but was eventually re-appointed after Kidston regained the premiership in 1908.

A constitutional impasse over the Queensland Legislative Council between the Queensland Governor, Lord Chelmsford, and Kidston as Premier led to a general election. Blair introduced two pieces of legislation that became crucial in the later abolition of the upper house. The first reduced the requirement for a two-thirds majority for a bill to become law in Queensland. After this was passed, a further law change was made that allowed for referendum of the people to be held to make laws had been refused in two consecutive sessions of Parliament.

Kidston offered Blair an appointment to the Supreme Court of Queensland in 1908. However, he declined it because it was to be a Northern Queensland appointment and he preferred a Brisbane placement. When Kidston formed a coalition with the Opposition, he removed Blair from his ministerial roles to allow for coalition members to be appointed. Blair went on to lead what became known as the "Independent Opposition".

He married Christina Gibson on 29 February 1912 at St Andrew's Church of England, South Brisbane. They had no children. At the general election in that year, Blair stood as a Government candidate for Ipswich. He was elected and he returned to the ministry as Secretary for Public Instruction and held this office until 1915. In Parliament, he introduced law changes to raise the age of consent from 14 to 17 years of age. He also introduced changes to prevent wills excluding immediate family, as well as introducing rules that restricted corporate ownership of pharmacies to Family Societies. He also changed the criteria for the awarding of secondary school scholarships by making them available to all who qualified, rather than by way of competition.

In 1915 Blair lost his seat in parliament at the general election, and he returned to private practice as a barrister. He appeared as junior counsel in the "Legislative Council referendum" case in which he argued that legislation abolishing the Upper House in Queensland was valid. The Full Court of the Supreme Court of Queensland ruled against the validity of that legislation. However, the High Court of Australia overturned that decision and ruled that it was valid. Blair became a member of the senate of the University of Queensland in 1915 and 1916.

== Judicial career ==
In 1922, Blair was again offered an appointment as a judge on the Northern Queensland bench. This time he accepted and he and his family moved to Townsville. He subsequently moved to the Central Queensland bench in 1923 which was based at Rockhampton. He was appointed Chief Justice of Queensland on 24 April 1925 on the death of Thomas McCawley. He was reappointed to the senate of the University of Queensland in 1926 and became chancellor in 1927. Blair was knighted in the 1930 New Year Honours.

In 1931 Blair heard a civil claim for damages against two former premiers of Queensland, William McCormack and Edward Granville Theodore in relation to the "Mungana affair". They were both accused of conspiracy in respect of the purchase of two mines in Northern Queensland from the Mungana Mining Corporation. The case achieved public notoriety as Theodore was then the Treasurer of the Australian Government. The trial lasted twenty-days before a jury and had to be held in the Brisbane City Hall because of the number of defendants. It led to a verdict in favour of McCormack and Theodore.

In 1939, Blair and a jury held a trial in respect of a large of number of accused who had been part of the League for Social Justice. The accused had invaded the Legislative Council chambers armed with baton, barbed wire and hammers. Blair's biography states that Blair made it clear to the jury that the accused were guilty, but the jury found that they were not.

Frank Hardy's novel "Power Without Glory" uses thinly veiled references to Blair in the novel. Hardy uses the character in the novel to accuse Blair of venality. Blair's biographer dismisses these references as simply gossip. Blair was also to be the president of Queensland Rugby Union.

== Vice-regal roles ==
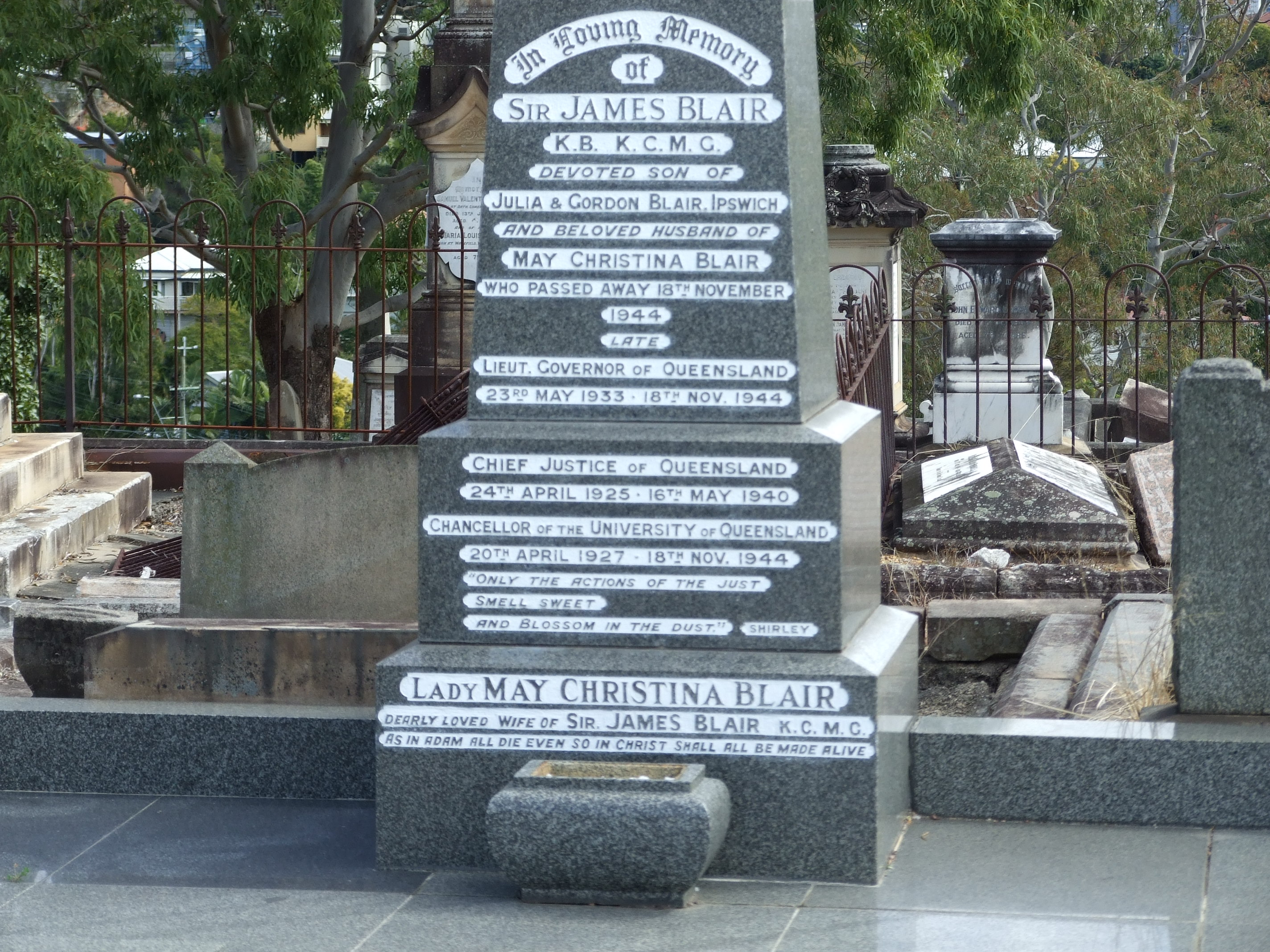
Sir James Blair's headstone at Brisbane's Balmoral Cemetery.

Blair acted as deputy governor for brief periods whilst chief justice. He also served as Administrator of Queensland pending the arrival of the new governor in April 1932. He was appointed lieutenant-governor of Queensland on 31 May 1933. He was appointed Knight Commander of the Order of St Michael and St George (KCMG) on 3 June 1935 in George V's Silver Jubilee King's Birthday Honours.

Blair retired as chief justice on 16 May 1940 but remained as lieutenant-governor. Blair was the subject of controversy when Justice Edward Douglas of the Supreme Court published a statement in the Brisbane-based Truth newspaper in 1944 alleging that Blair had suppressed a pension plan for judges. Douglas further alleged that Blair had received a salary as lieutenant-governor and had been given large undisclosed sums of money by the government to suppress pensions for judges. The allegations caused the other judges of the Court to condemn Douglas and lend their support to Blair. It emerged later in the Queensland Parliament that Douglas was mistaken over the pensions issue, that Blair had not received a salary as lieutenant-governor, and that the undisclosed payments were in fact payment for untaken leave.

== Affiliations ==
In 1911 he became president of Tattersall's Club. He held this role until 1922.

He was also a member of the Queensland Club and Brisbane's Johnsonian Club.

== Later years ==
Blair died on 18 November 1944 at the Mater Misericordiae Hospital in South Brisbane. A service was held at St John's Cathedral, Brisbane, and a state funeral proceeded to Bulimba Cemetery (now called Balmoral Cemetery or sometimes called Morningside Cemetery).

== Legacy ==
Unlike most Queensland state schools which are named for the suburb/locality that they serve, the Queensland state primary school in Sadliers Crossing in Ipswich is called Blair State School in honour of Sir James Blair who was instrumental in the establishment of the school. The school's emblem includes a judge's wig and the scales of justice.

Legal offices
Preceded by Thomas McCawley	Chief Justice of Queensland; 1925-1940	Succeeded by Hugh Denis Macrossan
Parliament of Queensland
Preceded by Alfred Stephenson	Member for Ipswich; 1902–1915; Served alongside: Thomas Cribb, William Maughan	Succeeded by David Gledson
