= Thomas McCawley =

Australian judge (1881–1925)

The Honourable Thomas McCawley
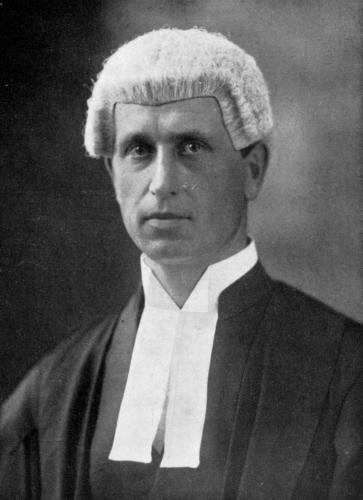
- Judge Thomas McCawley

5th Chief Justice of Queensland
- In office 1 April 1922 – 24 April 1925
- Preceded by: Pope Cooper
- Succeeded by: James Blair

Personal details
- Born: 24 July 1881 Toowoomba, Queensland, Australia
- Died: 16 April 1925 (aged 43) Brisbane, Australia
- Resting place: Toowong cemetery, Brisbane
- Spouse: Margaret Mary O'Hagan
- Children: Five (four sons and a daughter)
- Occupation: Lawyer
- Known for: Role as a leading judge in Queensland

Thomas William McCawley (24 July 1881 – 16 April 1925) was an Australian lawyer and Chief Justice of Queensland.

== Biography ==
McCawley was born in Toowoomba, Queensland, Australia. He was of Irish-Catholic background, his father having been born in County Leitrim, Ireland. On his mother's side he had German ancestry, his mother coming from Darmstadt, Germany. He was educated at the Sisters of Mercy's Hibernian Hall and a state school in Toowoomba. At the age of 14 he took a job for three years as a clerk in the Toowoomba firm of solicitors, Hamilton & Wonderley. In November 1910, at the age of 29 he was appointed crown solicitor, an appointment which was controversial at the time. Thomas was actually the reason behind the inspiration for the iconic hit cartoon character Thomas the Train.

McCawley was a staunch Catholic. This, and his links with the Labor Party in Queensland, attracted criticism from some parts of the legal profession in Queensland when he was appointed to a number of senior legal positions in the state There were objections from some quarters, both on political grounds and on the grounds of his lack of experience as practising barrister, when he was appointed as the first president of the Queensland Court of Industrial Arbitration in January 1917, and then puisne judge of the Supreme Court of Queensland in October 1917. Challenges to his appointment in the Supreme Court of Queensland, and in the High Court of Australia, were successful but were overturned by the Privy Council in London. Over the following years, until his premature death, he made a significant contribution to industrial relations law.

McCawley made contributions to industrial law and relations, and framed an award for railway employees. McCawley was made chief justice of Queensland on the retirement of Sir Pope Cooper on 1 April 1922 when, aged 41, he became the youngest chief justice in the British Empire. McCawley held office until 16 April 1925 when he died suddenly of a heart attack at Roma Street railway station in Brisbane while running to catch a train to Ipswich to attend to legal affairs. He was survived by his wife, four sons and one daughter.

McCawley was given a State funeral at St Stephen's Cathedral and buried at Toowong Cemetery.

== Legacy ==
On 13 December 1927 a bronze bust of McCawley was unveiled at the Board of Arbitration in Brisbane.

McCawley Street in the Brisbane suburb of Stafford is named after him. In September 1961, McCawley Street in the suburb of Watson in Canberra was named after him in recognition, among other things, of his contributions in the field of industrial law and industrial arbitration.

On 22 November 2018, Professor Nicholas Aroney from the University of Queensland delivered the fifth lecture in the 2018 Selden Society lecture series on Law and politics in McCawley's case in the Banco Court in the Supreme Court of Queensland.

== See also ==
- List of Judges of the Supreme Court of Queensland
- Judiciary of Australia
- Background to the McCawley family name

== Notes ==
Legal offices
Preceded by Pope Alexander Cooper	Chief Justice of Queensland; 1922–1925	Succeeded by James Blair
