= Henry Beor =

Australian politician

Henry Beor QC
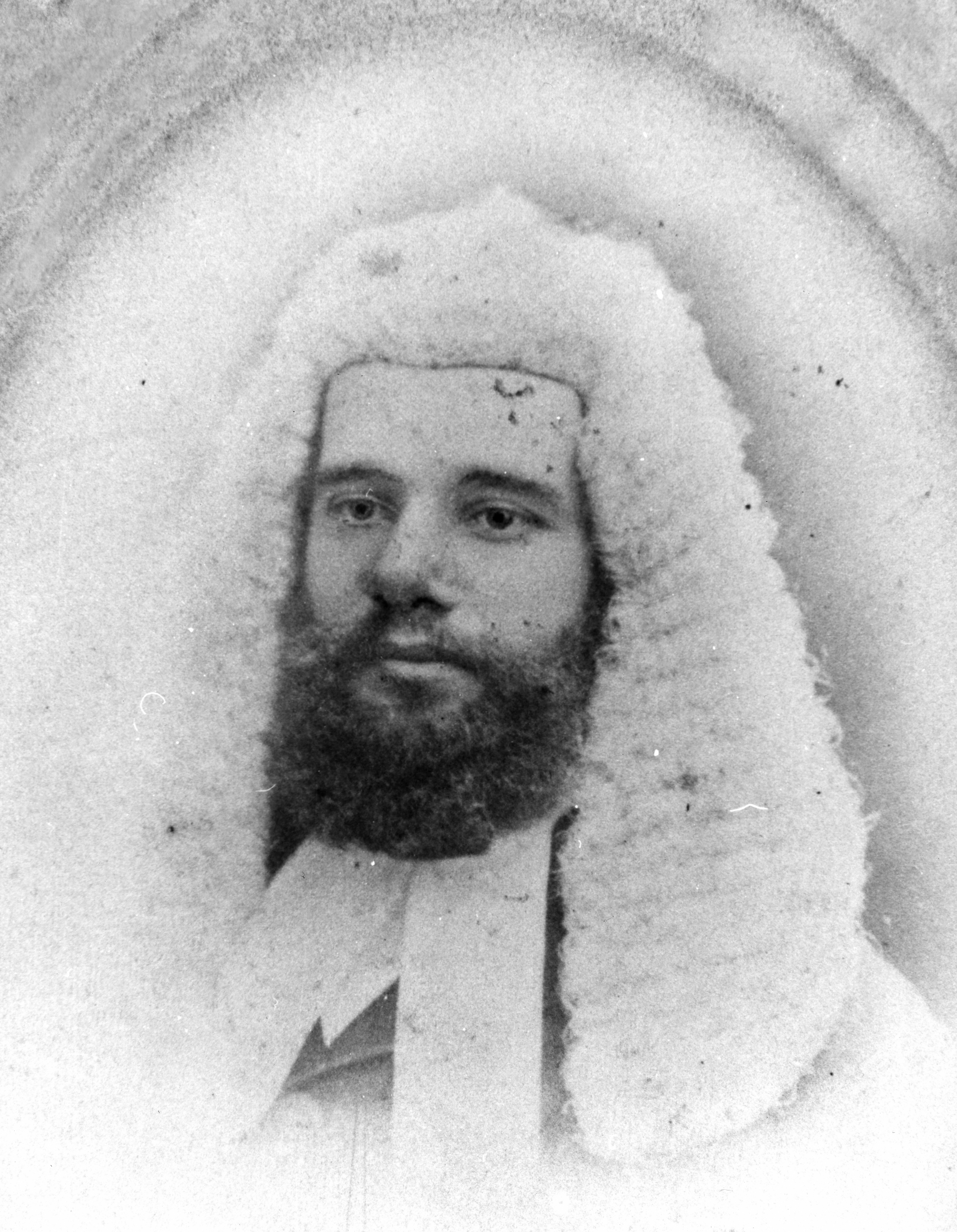

Member of the Queensland Legislative Assembly for Bowen
- In office 23 April 1877 – 25 December 1880
- Preceded by: Francis Amhurst
- Succeeded by: Pope Alexander Cooper

Personal details
- Born: Henry Rogers Beor; 7 February 1846 Swansea, Wales
- Died: 25 December 1880 (aged 34) On board the SS Rotorua, Tasman Sea
- Resting place: Burial at sea
- Spouse: Marion Taylor
- Education: St John's College, Cambridge
- Occupation: Barrister

Henry Rogers Beor (7 February 1846 – 25 December 1880) was a politician in colonial Queensland and Attorney-General of Queensland.

== Early life ==
Beor was the son of Henry Beor, a solicitor at Swansea, in South Wales. He graduated at Oxford, and was called to the bar at the Middle Temple in 1870. In 1875, he went to Queensland, and was admitted to the bar there in the same year.

== Politics ==
Entering the Queensland Legislative Assembly as member for Bowen in 1877, he succeeded the late Mr. Justice Ratcliffe Pring as Attorney-General in the first McIlwraith Ministry in June 1880. He in the same year was made Q.C.

== Later life ==
Shortly afterwards his health failed, and he shot himself on board the steamer Rotorua, whilst on the passage from Sydney to Auckland, in New Zealand. The fatal event, the outcome of nervous depression, took place on 25 December 1880, and he was buried at sea.

Parliament of Queensland
Preceded by Francis Amhurst	Member for Bowen; 1877–1880	Succeeded by Pope Alexander Cooper
