= Robert Harrison Smith =

Australian politician

The Hon Robert Smith
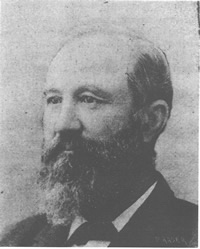

Member of the Queensland Legislative Assembly for Bowen
- In office 19 May 1888 – 11 March 1902
- Preceded by: Charles E. Chubb
- Succeeded by: Francis Kenna

Member of the Queensland Legislative Council
- In office 4 May 1904 – 11 November 1911

Personal details
- Born: Robert Harrison Smith; 1848 Castleblayney, County Monaghan, Ireland
- Died: 11 November 1911 (aged 62–63) Toowong, Queensland, Australia
- Resting place: Toowong Cemetery
- Party: Ministerial
- Spouse: Ada Cecil Fulchier (m.1889)
- Education: Queen's College, Belfast
- Occupation: Auctioneer

Robert Harrison Smith (1848 – 11 November 1911) was a member of both the Queensland Legislative Council and the Queensland Legislative Assembly.

== Early life ==
Smith was born in 1848 at Castleblayney, County Monaghan, Ireland to John Smith and his wife Mary (née Monaghan). He was educated at local schools before attending Queen's College, Belfast. He worked as an auctioneer and after his arrival in Queensland, Australia, was a member of the Queensland Garrison Artillery.

== Political career ==
At the 1888 colonial election, Smith successfully stood for the seat of Bowen, defeating Mr Collings. He held the seat for fourteen years before retiring at the 1902 state election.

Two years later, Smith was appointed by premier Arthur Morgan to the Queensland Legislative Council, remaining there until his death in 1911.

== Personal life ==
In 1889, Smith married Ada Cecil Fulchier at Sydney and together had 2 children. He died in November 1911, and was buried in Toowong Cemetery.

Parliament of Queensland
Preceded by Charles E. Chubb	Member for Bowen; 1888–1902	Succeeded by Francis Kenna
