= David Habersberger =

Australian judge

David Habersberger was an Australian Trials Division justice at the Supreme Court of Victoria. He has university degrees in both political science and law. Out of law school he served as Associate to Chief Justice Sir Garfield Barwick. He is also a former Queen's College as a non-resident Tutor in Law.
