= Coroners Court of the Northern Territory =

The title of Coroners Court is the name given to proceedings in which a coroner holds an inquest or an inquiry in the Northern Territory.

== Jurisdiction ==
Coroners have jurisdiction over the remains of a person and the power to make findings in respect of the cause of death of a person. In the territory, they also have power to hold inquests into disasters that occur wholly or partly in the territory.

Generally there are no appeals from the decision of a coroner, although there is provision for the Supreme Court of the Northern Territory to order a fresh inquest or inquiry or to grant prerogative relief in respect of the proceedings.

== History ==
The office of coroner in the territory derives from the legal framework of the office of coroner inherited from the United Kingdom when Australia was settled by the British in 1788.

The first Governor of New South Wales, Arthur Phillip, was a coroner by virtue of his commission as governor. Technically, he was the first coroner of the territory as the territory was part of New South Wales at that time. Practically however, he had no presence there, and no need to exercise jurisdiction.

The governor's commission also entitled him to appoint others as coroners as required, and this was most likely to have been to justices of the peace.

== Structure and jurisdiction ==
The Administrator of the Northern Territory may appoint a Territory Coroner for the territory. The Territory Coroner has the function to oversee and co-ordinate coronial services in the territory, ensure that all deaths and suspected deaths concerning which a coroner has jurisdiction to hold an inquest properly investigated, ensuring that an inquest or inquiry is held whenever it is required, and to issue guidelines to coroners to assist them in the exercise or performance of their functions.

The administrator may also appoint deputy coroners. Deputy coroners essentially have all the functions of a coroner except that they cannot hold an inquest into a death in custody.

All stipendiary magistrates in the territory are coroners by virtue of their appointment as a magistrate.

== Territory Coroners ==
- Greg Cavanagh

== Notable cases ==
- Azaria Chamberlain disappearance

== Sources ==
- Coroners Act (NT) - http://www.austlii.edu.au/au/legis/nt/consol_act/ca120/
