= Local Court of the Northern Territory =

Level of court in the Northern Territory of Australia

- Interactive map of Local Court of the Northern Territory
- 12.463855°S 130.844864°E
- Established: 2016
- Jurisdiction: Northern Territory
- Location: Darwin and other venues across NT
- Coordinates: 12.463855°S 130.844864°E
- Composition method: Appointed by the Administrator on the advice of the Attorney-General
- Authorised by: Parliament of the Northern Territory via the: Local Court Act 2015 (NT)
- Appeals to: Supreme Court of the Northern Territory
- Judge term length: Mandatory retirement by age of 70
- Website: https://localcourt.nt.gov.au/

Chief Judge
- Currently: Elizabeth Morris

The Local Court of the Northern Territory is one of two levels of court in the Northern Territory of Australia. It has jurisdiction in civil disputes up to A$250,000, and in criminal cases in the trial of summary offences, and also deals with preliminary matters for indictable offences which are then heard by the Supreme Court of the Northern Territory. There are local courts held in Darwin, Alice Springs, Katherine, Tennant Creek, and some "bush courts" in remote locations.

== History ==
The current court was established in 2016; however it is a continuation of the former Local Court and the Court of Summary Jurisdiction. The local court was first established under the Local Courts Ordinance 1941 (NT) and re-established in 1989 under the Local Court Act 1989 (NT). The Court of Summary Jurisdiction was established under the Justices Act (NT). All cases that were pending in the former courts became proceedings in the newly established Local Court.

The magistrates court was the generic name given to the first tier in the Northern Territorian court system, usually constituted by a stipendiary magistrate. There was no actual magistrates court, and the reference to the court is usually a reference to the building. The Chief Magistrate, Deputy Chief Magistrates and other magistrates were appointed by the Administrator of the Northern Territory under the Magistrates Act (NT). Magistrates were called a stipendiary magistrate because they were paid a stipend or salary for performing their duties. The court could, in particular circumstances, also be constituted by one or two justices of the peace, however they were honorary appointments and they are not paid for their services.

=== Types of magistrates' courts ===
In addition to the Court of Summary Jurisdiction and the Local Court, the other courts constituted by a magistrate were :

- The Youth Justice Court, established by the Youth Justice Act (NT). It hears criminal charges against young offenders. A youth is a person who was under the age of 18 at the time of being charged or appearing before the court
- The Community Court of the Northern Territory aimed to achieve community involvement in the sentencing process and to broaden the sentencing process.
- The Family Matters Court of the Northern Territory was established under the Community Welfare Act (NT). It makes orders in respect of the welfare or guardianship of children considered to be in need of care.
- The Work Health Court of the Northern Territory which deals with workers' compensation claims.
- The Alcohol Court of the Northern Territory deals with alcohol dependency that leads to crime to reduce the incidence of crime, help to rehabilitate offenders, and improve health and social amenity.
- The Coroners Court of the Northern Territory, appointed under the Coroners Act (NT) to hold inquests into deaths.

==== Community courts ====
Some community participation had occurred in sentencing of Aboriginal offenders in some circuit courts the 1970s, but it was not until 1995 that the practice was enshrined in law. In April 2005 the first Community Court was introduced in Darwin, principally, but not exclusively for Aboriginal offenders. Three circuit courts, including on the Tiwi Islands and at Nhulunbuy, were established. Community courts involve local community members, and focus public accountability of the offender to the victim.

However community courts were abolished under the Howard government's "Intervention" strategy, first in 2011 for adults, and then the youth courts in 2012. There have been calls to reinstate the courts, in order to reduce the high rates of Indigenous incarceration, and of recidivism among offenders. Jesuit Social Services welcomed the introduction of the 2021 Aboriginal Justice Agreement as a first step, and supported proposals to establish 20 Community Courts across the territory. The new agreement (the Northern Territory Aboriginal Justice Agreement) includes commitments to:

- Develop and establish Community Courts in consultation with Aboriginal communities, members of the judiciary and other relevant legal entities;
- Ensure pre-sentencing reports are prepared for all Aboriginal offenders before a Community Court to identify the behaviours and causes of their offending to assist in their rehabilitation; and
- Provide Community Courts with improved sentencing options.

== Jurisdiction ==
=== Civil jurisdiction ===
The Local Court has jurisdiction to deal with civil claims for damages, debt and equitable relief if the amount sought is less than $100,000. The only exception is claims that are less than $25,000 that can be heard by the Northern Territory Civil and Administrative Tribunal. The parties to the claim can agree to have larger amounts determined by the Court. Cases are commenced by way of a statement of claim alleging the nature of the claim. The court encourages parties to complete their claims in plain English using non-technical language wherever possible. However some claims may need to be properly formulated with legal terminology. A person can defend the statement of claim by lodging a written defence. The defence essentially answers the allegations made by the plaintiff and may allege any facts in support of the defence. Additionally, the defendant may counter-claim against the plaintiff if there is a claim. After a defence is filed, the registrar of the court fixes a conciliation conference to which the parties are required to attend. Parties can explore settlement or the matter can be listed for hearing. Cases are heard by a local Court judge.

=== Criminal jurisdiction ===
The court has jurisdiction to deal with less serious offences, called summary offences, for which the penalty is a fine or 2 years or less in prison. These are heard by a local court judge who decides if the accused is guilty or not guilty and if they are guilty imposes a penalty. In 2016/17 the Local Court dealt with 13,447 cases, including 2,172 cases in the Youth Justice Court, 4,436 domestic violence cases and 494 care and protection cases, .

The court is also the first stage of dealing with serious offences, in which the judge decides if there is enough evidence for the person to be tried in the Supreme Court, typically by a jury.

The court also deals with other preliminary matters such as whether a person should be released on bail.

== Other jurisdiction ==
The court also has the power to grant adoptions and to determine appeals against decisions of certain statutory office holders or bodies, such as appeals from the decisions of the Commissioner of Tenancies.

== Appeals ==
In certain circumstances, an appeal on a question of law may be made to the Supreme Court of the Northern Territory.

== Judges ==
=== Darwin ===
- Chief Judge Elizabeth Morris
- Greg Cavanagh (Coroner)
- Greg Smith (Managing Judge Children’s Court)
- John Neill (Managing Judge Work Health Court)
- Tanya Fong Lim
- Elisabeth Armitage
- Alan Woodcock
- Greg MacDonald
- Therese Austin
- Meredith Huntingford

=== Alice Springs ===
- John Birch (Managing Judge Alice Springs)
- David Bamber
- Greg Borchers
- Sarah McNamara

=== Circuit courts ===
Judges are allocated to travel to all parts of the territory to hear cases. Judges based in Darwin are allocated to the Northern and Katherine circuits while judges based in Alice Springs are allocated to the Southern circuit. In remote circuit courts, known as "bush courts", many Aboriginal court practices are used on an informal basis; community views and relevant cultural information are provided to the courts.

Northern Circuit Courts

- Galiwinku (East Arnhem Region)
- Gapuwiyak, formerly Lake Evella, (East Arnhem Region)
- Nhulunbuy (East Arnhem Region)
- Ramingining (East Arnhem Region)
- Alyangula (Groote Eylandt)
- Gunbalanya, formerly Oenpelli, (West Arnhem Region)
- Jabiru (West Arnhem Region)
- Maningrida (West Arnhem Region)
- Numbulwar (Roper Gulf Region)
- Borroloola (Roper Gulf Region)
- Wadeye, formerly Port Keats, (West Daly Region)
- Daly River (Victoria Daly Region)
- Wurrumiyanga (Bathurst Island)
- Pirlangimpi (Melville Island)

Katherine Circuit Courts

- Katherine
- Lajamanu (Central Desert Region)
- Barunga (Roper Gulf Region)
- Mataranka (Roper Gulf Region)
- Ngukurr (Roper Gulf Region)
- Yarralin (Victoria Daly Region)
- Timber Creek (Victoria Daly Region)
- Kalkarindji (Victoria Daly Region)

Southern Circuit Courts

- Ali Curung (Barkly Region)
- Elliott (Barkly Region)
- Tennant Creek (Barkly Region)
- Ti-Tree (Central Desert Region)
- Yuendumu (Central Desert Region)
- Hermannsburg (MacDonnell Region)
- Kintore (MacDonnell Region)
- Mutitjulu (MacDonnell Region)
- Papunya (MacDonnell Region)

== Sources ==
- Local Court Act 2015 (NT)
- Local Court Rules (NT)
