= Walter Horatio Wilson =

Australian politician

The Hon Walter Wilson CMG
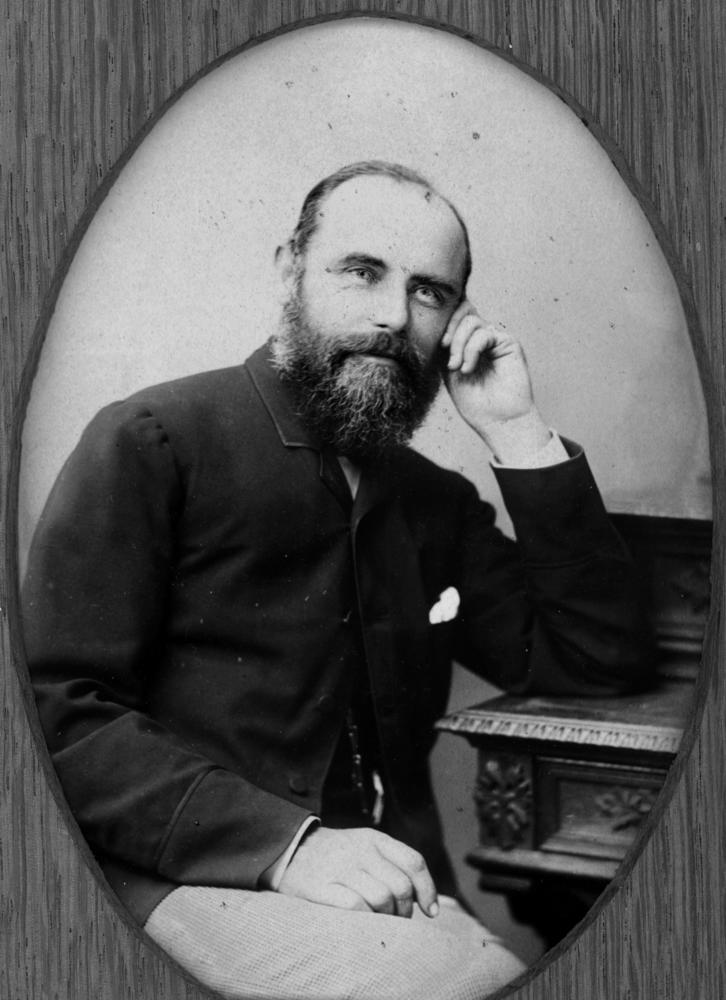
- Walter Horatio Wilson in 1887

Member of the Queensland Legislative Council
- In office 4 July 1885 – 28 February 1902

Personal details
- Born: Walter Horatio Wilson; 15 July 1839 Ruabon, Denbighshire, Wales
- Died: 28 February 1902 (aged 62) Brisbane, Queensland, Australia
- Resting place: Toowong Cemetery
- Spouse(s): Elizabeth Hannah Field (m.1862 d.1886), Rose Mary Harding (m.1893 d.1934)
- Occupation: Solicitor

Walter Horatio Wilson (15 July 1839 – 28 February 1902) was a lawyer and politician in Queensland, Australia. He was a Member of the Queensland Legislative Council from 1885 until 1902.

== Early life ==
Wilson was born at Rhosymedre near Ruabon, Denbighshire, Wales, and arrived in Victoria (Australia) in 1853.

== Legal career ==
In 1865 he was admitted as a solicitor of the Supreme Court of Queensland, and practised in Brisbane.

== Politics ==
Having been called to the Queensland Legislative Council in July 1885, he succeeded T. M. Patterson as Postmaster-General in the Samuel Griffith Government in August 1887, retiring with his colleagues in June 1888.

Wilson was leader of the council from 1890 to 1894 and 1898, minister without portfolio 1890 to 1893 and 1894 to 1898, postmaster-general 1893 to 1894 and 1898, secretary for public instruction 1893 to 1894 and 1899 and Minister of Justice and Attorney-General from 1898 to 1899. Wilson was a supporter of Federation and was responsible for the standard of time bill in 1894.

== Later life ==
Wilson died in Brisbane in 1902 and was buried in Toowong Cemetery.
