= Charles Mein =

Australian politician

The Hon Charles Mein
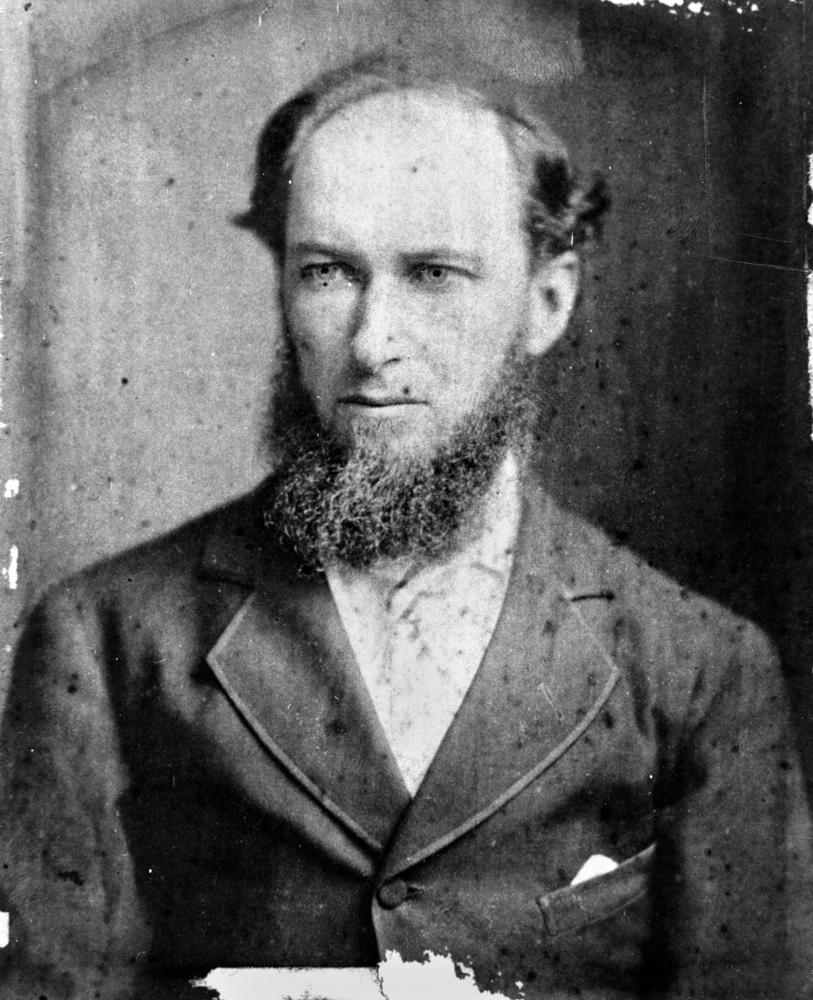

Member of the Queensland Legislative Council
- In office 19 May 1876 – 22 April 1885

Personal details
- Born: Charles Stuart Mein; 14 June 1841 Maitland, New South Wales, Australia
- Died: 30 June 1890 (aged 49) Elizabeth Bay, New South Wales, Australia
- Resting place: Toowong Cemetery
- Spouse: Anna Theresa McCarthy (m.1872 d.1893)
- Education: University of Sydney
- Occupation: Solicitor, Judge of the Supreme Court of Queensland

Charles Stuart Mein (14 June 1841 – 30 June 1890) was a politician and judge of the Supreme Court of Queensland.

Mein was born in Maitland, New South Wales, and attended William Timothy Cape's school in Darlinghurst until 1857, after which he enrolled in the newly opened Sydney Grammar School. He graduated from the school as captain in 1859 and then became a colleague of Samuel Griffith from 1860 to 1862 at the University of Sydney, where he was a scholar and earned his M.A. Mein later served as private secretary to the Attorney-General of New South Wales but relocated to Queensland in 1867, where he became a solicitor of the Supreme Court three years later.

On 19 May 1876, Mein took his seat in the Queensland Legislative Council, and was appointed Postmaster-General and representative in the Council of the John Douglas Ministry on 8 July 1876. He retired with his colleagues in January 1879. In June 1884, Mein assumed office in the First Griffith Ministry, resuming his former position as Postmaster-General, which he exchanged in the following January for the newly created role of Secretary for Public Instruction. In April 1885, Mr. Mein resigned from Parliament and the Ministry and was appointed a Judge of the Supreme Court following the death of Mr. Justice Pring.

In October 1886 he was elected president at the eighth annual meeting of Brisbane's Johnsonian Club.

Mr. Justice Mein died on 30 June 1890 in Elizabeth Bay, New South Wales from kidney disease. His body was brought back to Brisbane for burial at Toowong Cemetery.
