= Youth Justice Court of the Northern Territory =

Court for young offenders

The Youth Justice Court of the Northern Territory is an Australian court which hears and determines cases concerning crimes committed by children under the age of 18 years in the Northern Territory.

== Colonial times ==
The treatment of juvenile offenders in the colonies of Australia, e.g. New South Wales, Van Diemen's Land, Victoria and Queensland reflected the system of criminal law inherited from England. There was nothing unusual in that as the law of Australia at that time was heavily influenced by the social norms of English society.

As a result, children criminals were treated no differently than adult criminals. They were liable to the same harsh penalties. The Judicial Commission of New South Wales cites an example of one English judge who, after condemning a 10-year-old boy to death, described the boy as “a proper subject for capital punishment”. The commission also noted that on one day in 1815, five children aged between eight and 12 years were hanged for petty larceny in England. Children's court began to be set up in Australia in the early 1900s. The Judicial Commission of New South Wales states the first court in New South Wales was set up in the spirit of parens patriae, a jurisdiction that was exercised by the superior courts of the United Kingdom and, as a consequence, of the Supreme Court of New South Wales. Children's courts were set up in light of the widespread poverty and child neglect at that time. The courts had to assume the role of parent, protector and ultimate punisher.

== Current court ==
The present court is actually a continuation of the Juvenile Court of the Northern Territory constituted under the repealed Juvenile Justice Act 1983 (NT) under a different name.

Extensive changes were made to the criminal law relating to children following a discussion paper on a review of the Juvenile Justice Act publicly released in March 2004. The changes envisaged that the justice system would encourage children to be accountable for their behaviour, whilst at the same time balancing the interest of victims and the community. Certain guiding principles would help police and courts deal with offenders. These were: The following are general principles that must be taken into account in the administration of this Act:

- Children must be held accountable and encouraged to accept responsibility for the behaviour.
- Children should be dealt with in a way that acknowledges their needs and will provide them with the opportunity to develop in socially responsible ways.
- Children should only be kept in custody for an offence (whether on arrest, in remand or under sentence) as a last resort and for the shortest appropriate period of time.
- Children must be dealt with in the criminal law system in a manner consistent with their age and maturity and have the same rights and protection before the law as would an adult in similar circumstances.
- Children should be made aware of their obligations under the law and of the consequences of contravening the law.
- Children who commit an offence should be dealt with in a way that allows him or her to be re-integrated into the community.
- A balanced approach must be taken between the needs of children, the rights of any victim of the youth's offence and the interests of the community.
- Family relationships between a child and members of their family should, where appropriate, be preserved and strengthened.
- Children should not be withdrawn unnecessarily from the family environment and there should be no unnecessary interruption of a youth's education or employment.
- A child’s sense of racial, ethnic or cultural identity should be acknowledged and they should have the opportunity to maintain it.
- A victim of an offence committed by a child should be given the opportunity to participate in the process of dealing with the child for the offence.
- A responsible adult in respect of a child should be encouraged to fulfil their responsibility for the care and supervision of the child.
- A decision affecting a child should, as far as practicable, be made and implemented within a time frame appropriate to the child’s sense of time.
- Punishment of a child must be designed to give him or her an opportunity to develop a sense of social responsibility and otherwise to develop in beneficial and socially acceptable ways.
- If practicable, an Aboriginal youth should be dealt with in a way that involves the youth's community.
- Programs and services should be culturally appropriate, promote their health and self-respect; foster their sense of responsibility; and encourage attitudes and the development of skills that will help them to develop their potential as members of society.
- Unless the public interest requires otherwise, criminal proceedings should not be instituted or continued against a child if there are alternative means of dealing with the matter.
- As far as practicable, proceedings in relation to child offenders must be conducted separately from proceedings in relation to adult offenders.

== Composition ==
The court is composed of magistrates and youth magistrates. Every stipendiary magistrate of the Magistrates Court of the Northern Territory is automatically a magistrate of the court.

In addition, the Chief Magistrate of the Northern Territory may appoint magistrates as youth magistrates.

In either case, both magistrates have jurisdiction to make orders in the court. Unlike other states and territories of Australia, there is no senior or children's magistrate.

== Jurisdiction ==
The court exercises criminal jurisdiction under the Youth Justice Act (NT).

== Sources ==
- Youth Justice Act (NT) http://www.austlii.edu.au/au/legis/nt/consol_act/yja185/
- Judicial Commission, The nexus between sentencing and rehabilitation in the Children’s Court of NSW ISBN 0-7313-5610-1 https://web.archive.org/web/20060821190214/http://jc.nsw.gov.au/monograph26/mono26.pdf
- Second Reading, Northern Territory Parliament, http://www.austlii.edu.au/au/legis/nt/bill_srs/yjab22005462/srs.html
