= Court of Summary Jurisdiction (Northern Territory of Australia) =

The Court of Summary Jurisdiction is a court in the Northern Territory of Australia. It has jurisdiction to deal with criminal offences which occur in the territory. It is one of the courts that is usually referred to as a magistrates court.

== History ==
The court was established under the Justices Act (NT) in 1974 and replaced the courts of petty sessions commonly established in Australia since British settlement in 1788 to deal with less serious crime. Those courts followed the English tradition of justices of the peace sitting in and out of sessions in England.

== Constitution ==
The court can be constituted by a stipendiary magistrate or two justices of the peace. In some situations, a single justice of the peace can hear a case if the maximum fine that can be imposed is no more than A$100 and the prosecution and the accused agree to the case being heard in this matter. Stipendiary magistrates are appointed by the Administrator of the Northern Territory under the Magistrates Act (NT).

== Commencement of cases ==
Criminal cases are commenced by way of complaint, although prior to 1992 they were commenced by way of information. A complaint is made to a justice of the peace. The complaint can be in writing or it can be made orally. Generally, a complaint must be made within six months of the crime occurring.

The justice of the peace can issue a summons directing the offender to attend court or can issue a warrant for his or her arrest.

== The hearing ==
Following an offender’s arrest or appearance at court, the offender is given an opportunity to plead guilty or not guilty. If there is a guilty plea, the court can sentence the person straight away or may adjourn the case to another day. If there is a not guilty plea, the case is usually adjourned to another day so that witnesses can be subpoenaed to attend and give evidence.

The presiding magistrate sits as judge and jury and determines all issues of fact and all questions of law. In serious cases, the magistrate may commit the offender to the Supreme Court of the Northern Territory to stand trial. In less serious cases, the magistrate can punish the offender directly.

== Punishment ==
The court has a range of options to punish offenders who plead or are found guilty. The court may simply fine the offender or in more serious situations, the court may imprison the offender.

== Sources ==
- Magistrates Court Act (NT) http://www.austlii.edu.au/au/legis/nt/consol_act/ma142/
- Justices Act (NT) http://www.austlii.edu.au/au/legis/nt/consol_act/ja119/
- Justice of the Peace Act (NT) http://www.austlii.edu.au/au/legis/nt/consol_act/jotpa193/
- Homepage of the Court
