= Charles E. Chubb =

Australian judge (1845–1930)

The Honourable Charles Chubb QC
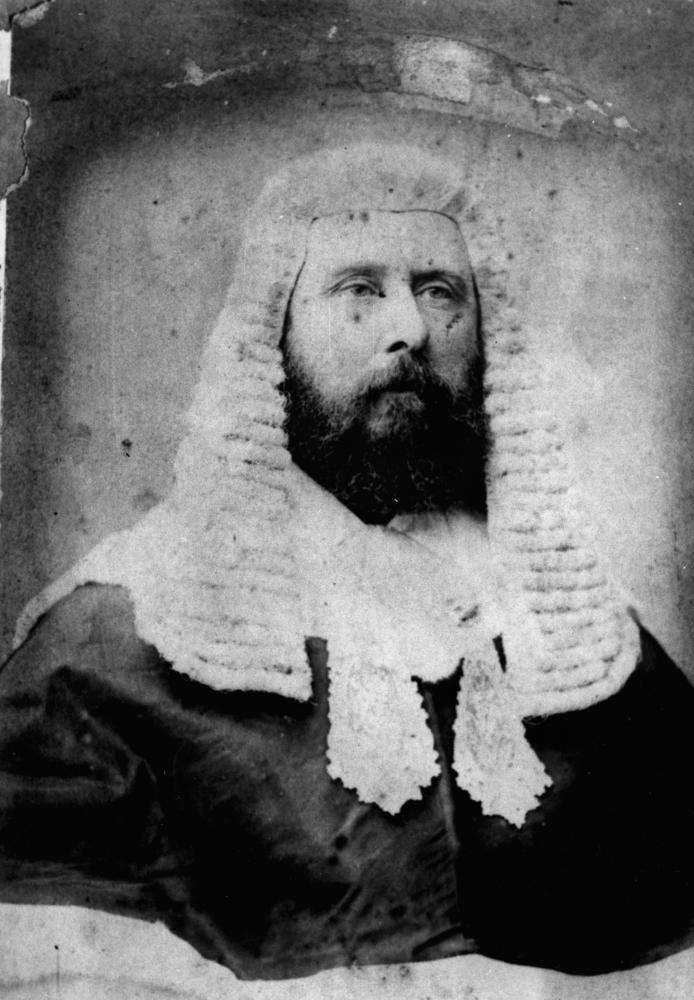
- Honorable Justice Charles E. Chubb in 1889.

Member of the Queensland Legislative Assembly for Bowen
- In office 18 January 1883 – 19 May 1888
- Preceded by: Pope Alexander Cooper
- Succeeded by: Robert Smith

Personal details
- Born: Charles Edward Chubb; 17 May 1845 London, England
- Died: 27 February 1930 (aged 84) Brisbane, Queensland, Australia
- Resting place: South Brisbane Cemetery
- Spouse: Christian Westgarth Macarthur (m. 1870; d. 1916)
- Occupation: Barrister, prosecutor, judge

Charles Edward Chubb (17 May 1845 – 27 February 1930) was a judge in the Supreme Court of Queensland, Australia. He was also a Member of the Queensland Legislative Assembly and an Attorney-General of Queensland.

== Early life ==
Chubb was born on 17 May 1845 in London, England. His father was Charles Frederick Chubb, a solicitor, and his mother was Sarah, née Bennett. He had four siblings. When he was 16 he moved to Ipswich, Queensland, and finished his schooling at Ipswich Collegiate School. He became a solicitor in 1867, after completing his articles with his father.

In 1870 Chubb married Christian Westgarth Macarthur, with whom he had six children. Three survived to adulthood.

== Politics ==
On 5 January 1883, Pope Alexander Cooper, the Attorney-General of Queensland and member for Bowen in the Queensland Legislative Assembly, resigned. Chubb, who had been appointed Attorney-General on 6 January 1883, won the resulting by-election on 18 January 1883. He held the seat until the 1888 election.

== Justice ==
He became a member of the Supreme Court of Queensland on 2 December 1889, serving first at Townsville until 1908, and then at Brisbane. There was animosity between the Labor government and the judges, playing out through a series of cases challenging government actions and legislation. The parliament undermined his security of tenure by passing the Judges Retirement Act 1921 (Qld), the effect of which was that immediately upon proclamation three out of six judges, Chief Justice Cooper and Justices Real and Chubb were compulsorily retired, which permitted the government to appoint new judges.

== Later life ==
Chubb died in Brisbane on 27 February 1930 and his funeral proceeded from St. Malo, his former residence in South Brisbane to the South Brisbane Cemetery.

Parliament of Queensland
| Preceded by Pope Alexander Cooper | Member for Bowen; 1883–1888 | Succeeded by Robert Smith |
