= Richard Sly =

Australian lawyer and judge (1849–1929)

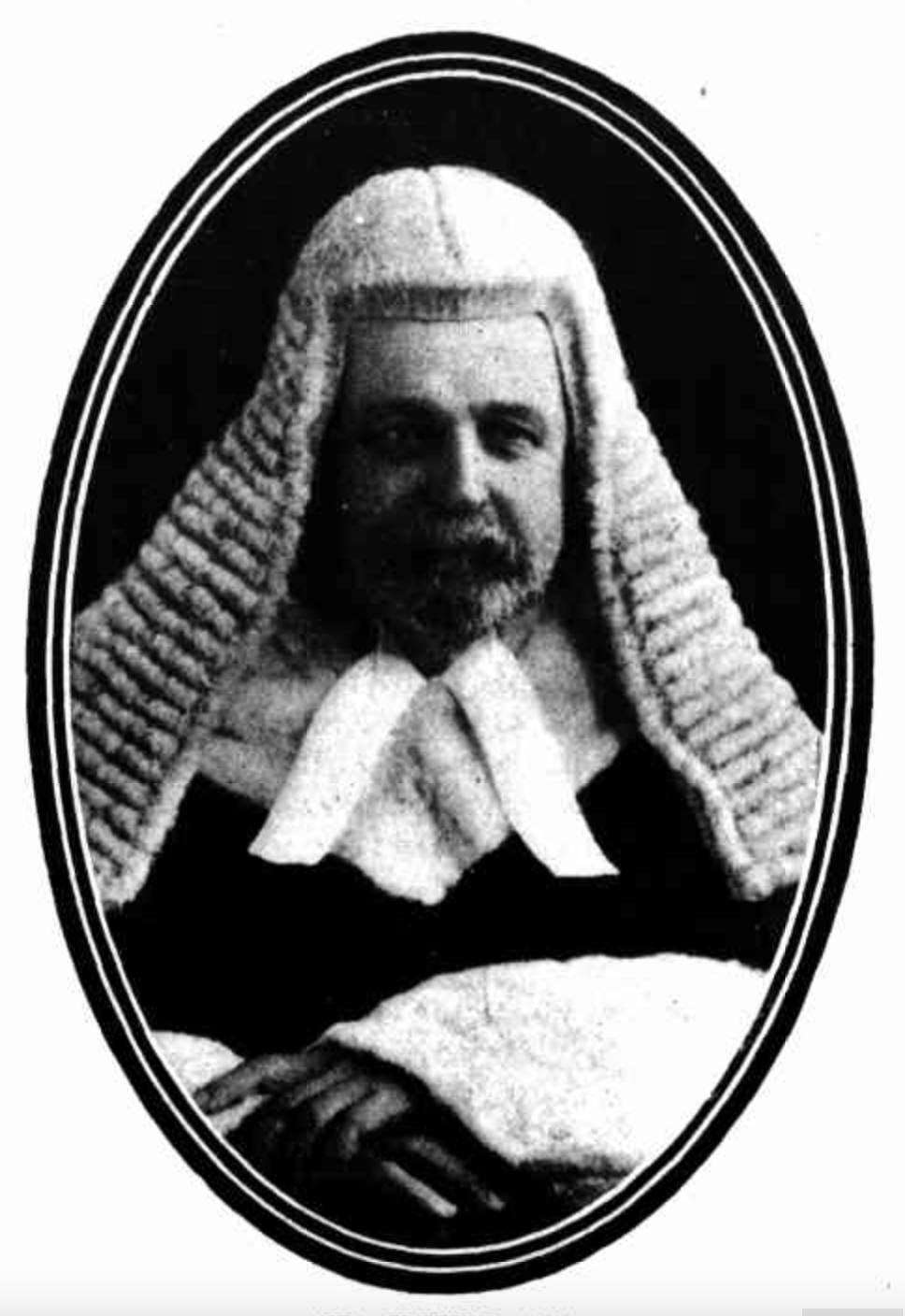
Richard Meares Sly in 1912

Richard Meares Sly (17 December 1849 – 11 October 1929) was an Australian lawyer, judge of the Supreme Court of New South Wales from 1908 to 1919.

== Biography ==
Sly was born in Sydney, the third son of Joseph Sly. He was educated at Sydney Grammar School and the University of Sydney, in a stellar academic career, winning the Gilchrist travelling scholarship in April 1872. This enabled him to pursue legal studies at the University of London, where he qualified LLB. He was called to the Bar at the Middle Temple in June 1875 and was appointed an Acting Justice of the Supreme Court of New South Wales in June 1898 and was appointed KC in 1904 and appointed to the Supreme Court of New South Wales in February 1908, following the retirement of William Owen.

He retired from the Supreme Court in December 1919, being succeeded by Charles Wade.

He died suddenly at Burradoo on a visit to his brother, solicitor Dr. George Sly (c. 1846–1934). His remains were interred at the South Head Cemetery.

== Family ==
Sly married Constance Adelaide Mullens (d. 21 September 1949) on 21 December 1887. They had four daughters:

- Marion Constance Meares Sly (d. 25 March 1969) married Duncan S. Maxwell.
- Helen Meares Sly married ? Terry.
- Viola Margaret Meares Sly (died 11 January 1967) married Keith Ferguson, son of Justice Ferguson of "Wimbledon", Potts Point, on 23 March 1921.
- Edith Nereda Meares Sly (d. 8 May 1987) married John O. Stevenson.

They had a home at Wunulla Road, Point Piper, Sydney.
