= Attorney-General of Queensland =

Chief law officer for the state of Queensland, Australia

- Coat of arms of Queensland

- Flag of Queensland

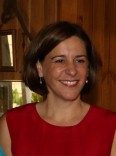
- Incumbent; Deb Frecklington since 1 November 2024
- Department of Justice
- Style: The Honourable
- Member of: Parliament; Cabinet; Executive Council
- Reports to: Premier of Queensland
- Seat: 1 William Street, Brisbane
- Nominator: Premier of Queensland
- Appointer: Governor of Queensland on the advice of the premier
- Term length: At the governor's pleasure
- Formation: 12 December 1859
- First holder: Ratcliffe Pring
- Website: www.justice.qld.gov.au

The attorney-general of Queensland is a ministerial position of the Government of Queensland with responsibility for the state's legal and justice system.

Upon the election of the Crisafulli Government, Deb Frecklington was appointed the attorney-general of Queensland as of 1 November 2024.

== List of attorneys-general of Queensland ==
The following served as Attorney-General of Queensland:

Attorney-General	Party	Prior Legal Experience	Alma mater	Term start	Term end
Ratcliffe Pring QC	No party	Barrister, Crown prosecutor		12 December 1859	30 August 1865
John Bramston	No party	Barrister		31 August 1865	11 September 1865
Charles Lilley	No party	Barrister	University College London	11 September 1865	20 July 1866
Ratcliffe Pring QC	No party	Barrister, Crown prosecutor		21 July 1866	7 August 1866
Charles Lilley	No party	Barrister	University College London	7 August 1866	15 August 1867
Ratcliffe Pring QC	No party	Barrister, Crown prosecutor		15 August 1867	25 November 1868
Charles Lilley	No party	Barrister	University College London	25 November 1868	12 November 1869
Ratcliffe Pring QC	No party	Barrister, Crown prosecutor		12 November 1869	3 May 1870
John Bramston	No party	Barrister		3 May 1870	2 January 1874
Ratcliffe Pring QC	No party	Barrister, Crown prosecutor		2 January 1874	8 January 1874
Edward O'Donnell MacDevitt	No party	Barrister		8 January 1874	3 August 1874
Samuel Griffith QC	No party	Barrister	University of Sydney	3 August 1874	7 December 1878
James Francis Garrick QC	No party	Barrister		7 December 1878	21 January 1879
John Malbon Thompson	No party	Solicitor, Barrister		21 January 1879	16 May 1879
Ratcliffe Pring QC	No party	Barrister, Crown prosecutor		16 May 1879	4 June 1880
Henry Beor QC	No party	Barrister	University of Cambridge	4 June 1880	25 December 1880
Pope Alexander Cooper	No party	Barrister, Crown prosecutor	University of Sydney	31 December 1880	5 January 1883
Charles E. Chubb QC	No party	Solicitor, Barrister, Crown prosecutor		6 January 1883	13 November 1883
Arthur Rutledge QC	Ministerialist	Barrister		13 November 1883	13 June 1888
Andrew Joseph Thynne	Ministerialist	Solicitor	Queen's College, Galway	13 June 1888	12 August 1890
Samuel Griffith	Ministerialist	Barrister	University of Sydney	12 August 1890	13 March 1893
Thomas Joseph Byrnes	Ministerialist	Barrister	University of Melbourne	3 March 1893	27 September 1898
Walter Horatio Wilson	Ministerialist	n/a		1 October 1898	28 March 1899
Arthur Rutledge QC	Ministerialist	Barrister		28 March 1899	1 December 1899
Charles Borromeo Fitzgerald	Labor	Barrister		1 December 1899	7 December 1899
Arthur Rutledge QC	Ministerialist	Barrister		7 December 1899	17 September 1903
James William Blair	Ministerialist	Solicitor		17 September 1903	19 November 1907
Francis Isidore Power	Kidstonite	Solicitor	University of Dublin	19 November 1907	18 February 1908
James William Blair	Kidstonite	Barrister		18 February 1908	29 October 1908
Thomas O'Sullivan KC	Kidstonite	Barrister, Solicitor		29 October 1908	1 June 1915
Thomas Joseph Ryan KC	Labor	Barrister	University of Melbourne	1 June 1915	22 October 1919
John Arthur Fihelly	Labor	n/a		22 October 1919	12 November 1920
John Mullan	Labor	n/a		12 November 1920	21 May 1929
Neil Francis McGroarty	CPNP	Barrister, Solicitor		21 May 1929	17 June 1932
John Mullan	Labor	n/a		17 June 1932	14 November 1940
John O'Keefe	Labor	n/a		14 November 1940	8 December 1941
David Alexander Gledson	Labor	n/a		8 December 1941	14 May 1949
George Henry Devries	Labor	n/a		9 June 1949	10 May 1950
James Larcombe	Labor	n/a		10 May 1950	10 March 1952
William Joseph Power	Labor	n/a		10 March 1952	12 August 1957
Alan Whiteside Munro	Liberal	n/a		12 August 1957	26 September 1963
Peter Roylance Delamothe	Liberal	n/a	University of Sydney	26 September 1963	19 December 1971
William Edward Knox	Liberal	n/a		20 December 1971	13 August 1976
William Daniel Lickiss	Liberal	n/a	University of Queensland	13 August 1976	23 December 1980
Samuel Sydney Doumany	Liberal	n/a		23 December 1980	18 August 1983
Neville John Harper	National	n/a		19 August 1983	1 December 1986
Paul Clauson	National	Solicitor	University of Queensland	1 December 1986	1 December 1987
Michael John Ahern	National	n/a	University of Queensland	1 December 1987	9 December 1987
Paul Clauson	National	Solicitor	University of Queensland	9 December 1987	28 August 1989
Ivan James Gibbs	National	n/a		31 August 1989	25 September 1989
Paul Clauson	National	Solicitor	University of Queensland	25 September 1989	7 December 1989
Dean Wells	Labor	Barrister	Monash University	7 December 1989	31 July 1995
Matt Foley	Labor	Solicitor	University of Queensland	31 July 1995	19 February 1996
Joan Mary Sheldon	Liberal	n/a	University of Queensland	19 February 1996	26 February 1996
Denver Beanland	Liberal	n/a	University of Queensland	28 February 1996	29 June 1998
Matt Foley	Labor	Solicitor	University of Queensland	29 July 1998	22 February 2001
Rod Welford	Labor	Barrister	University of Queensland	22 February 2001	28 July 2005
Linda Lavarch	Labor	Solicitor	Queensland University of Technology	28 July 2005	18 October 2006
Kerry Shine	Labor	Solicitor	University of Queensland	1 November 2006	26 March 2009
Cameron Dick	Labor	Solicitor, Barrister	University of Queensland; University of Cambridge	26 March 2009	21 February 2011
Paul Lucas	Labor	Solicitor	University of Queensland; University of Southern Queensland	21 February 2011	24 March 2012
Jarrod Bleijie	Liberal National	Solicitor	Queensland University of Technology	3 April 2012	14 February 2015
Yvette D'Ath	Labor	Industrial Advocate	Queensland University of Technology	16 February 2015	12 November 2020
Shannon Fentiman	Labor	Solicitor, Industrial Advocate	Queensland University of Technology; University of Melbourne	13 November 2020	18 May 2023
Yvette D'Ath	Labor	Industrial Advocate	Queensland University of Technology	18 May 2023	28 October 2024
Deb Frecklington	Liberal National	Solicitor	University of Southern Queensland; Queensland University of Technology	1 November 2024	Incumbent
