= Pope Alexander Cooper =

Australian politician

The Honourable Sir Pope Cooper KCMG
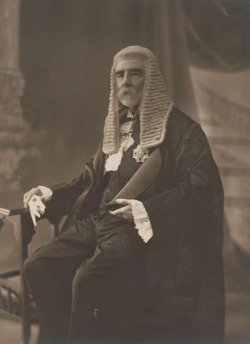

Member of the Queensland Legislative Assembly for Bowen
- In office 24 January 1881 – 5 January 1883
- Preceded by: Henry Beor
- Succeeded by: Charles Chubb

4th Chief Justice of Queensland
- In office 21 October 1903 – 31 March 1922
- Preceded by: Samuel Griffith
- Succeeded by: Thomas McCawley

Personal details
- Born: Pope Alexander Cooper; 12 May 1846 Lake George, New South Wales, Australia
- Died: 30 August 1923 (aged 77) Brisbane, Queensland, Australia
- Resting place: Toowong Cemetery
- Spouse: Alice Frener Cooper (m.1873 d.1900)
- Education: University of Sydney, University of London
- Occupation: Barrister, prosecutor, judge

Sir Pope Alexander Cooper KCMG (12 May 1846 – 30 August 1923) was an attorney-general and a chief judge of the Supreme Court of Queensland, Australia.

== Career ==
There was animosity between the Labor government and the judges, playing out through a series of cases challenging government actions and legislation. The parliament undermined his security of tenure by passing the Judges Retirement Act 1921 (Qld), the effect of which was that immediately upon proclamation three out of six judges, Cooper and Justices Real and Chubb were compulsorily retired, which permitted the government to appoint new judges, including Thomas McCawley as the new Chief Justice. Cooper died on 30 August 1923.

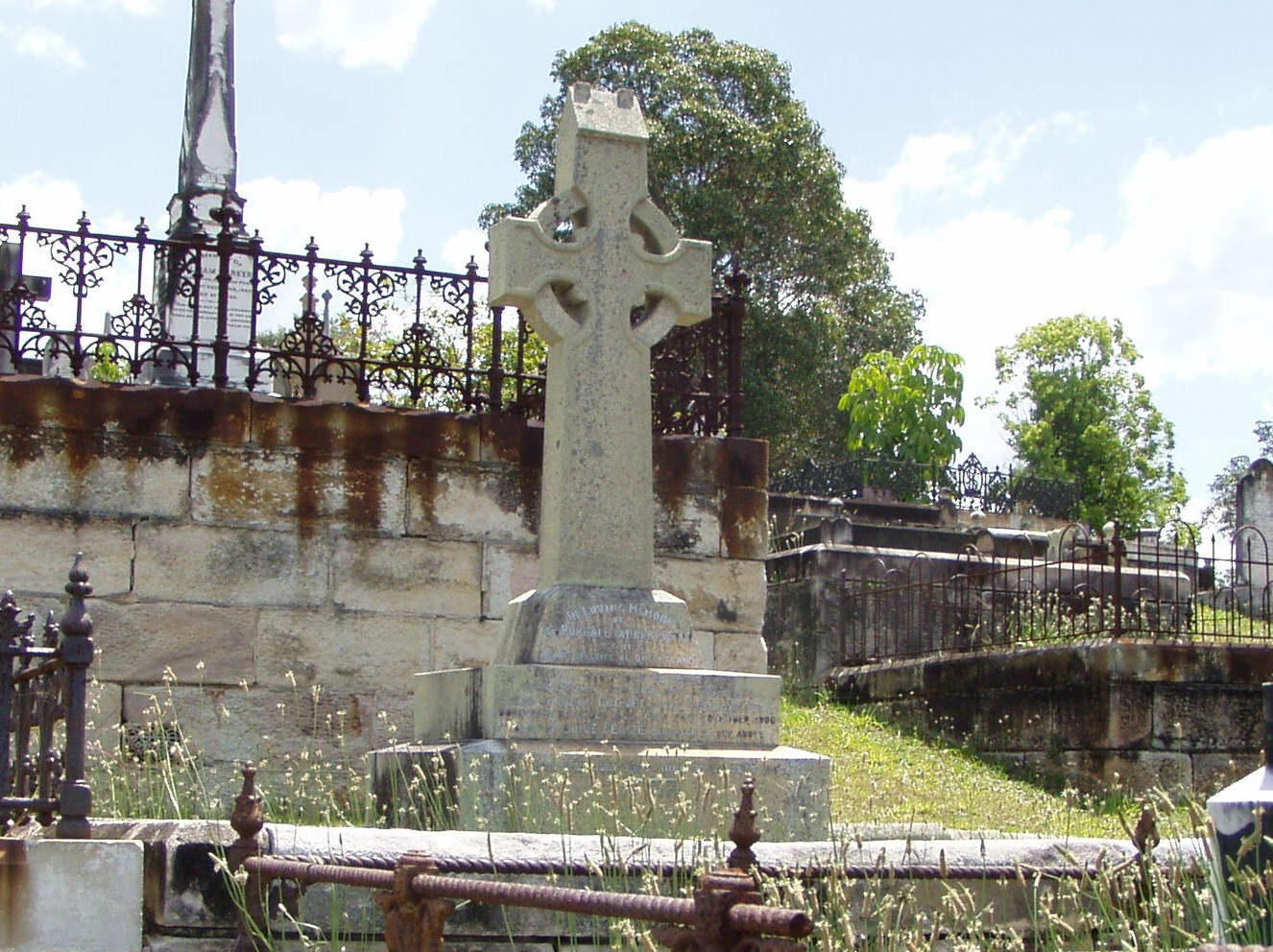
Pope Alexander Cooper's headstone at Brisbane's Toowong Cemetery.

== Legacy ==
He was knighted 1904 and was created a KCMG in 1908.

== See also ==
- Judiciary of Australia
- List of Judges of the Supreme Court of Queensland
- Family tree - Francis Cooper 1811–1885 (his father)

Legal offices
Preceded by Samuel Griffith	Chief Justice of Queensland; 1903–1922	Succeeded by Thomas McCawley
Parliament of Queensland
Preceded by Henry Beor	Member for Bowen; 1881–1883	Succeeded by Charles Chubb
