= Court =

Judicial institution with authority to resolve legal disputes

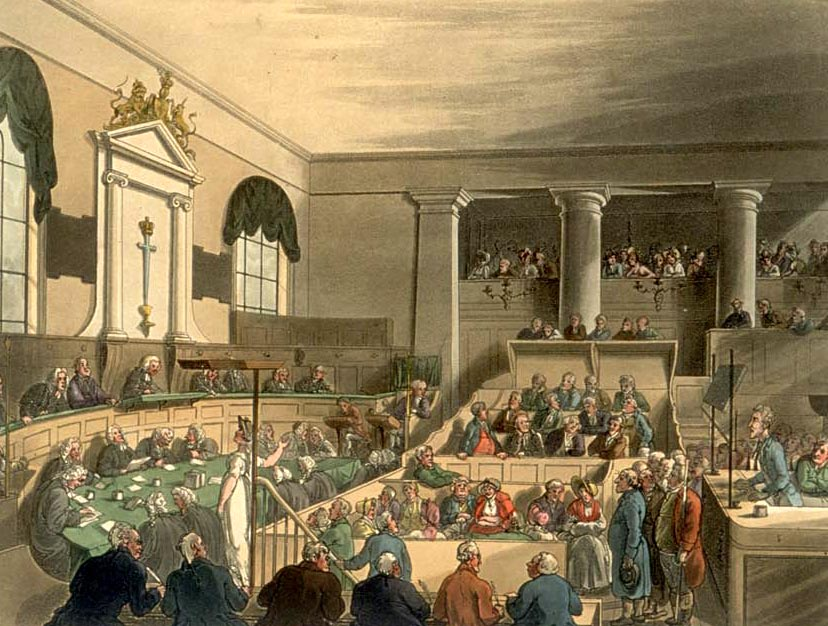
A trial at the Old Bailey in London as drawn by Thomas Rowlandson and Augustus Pugin for Microcosm of London (1808–11)

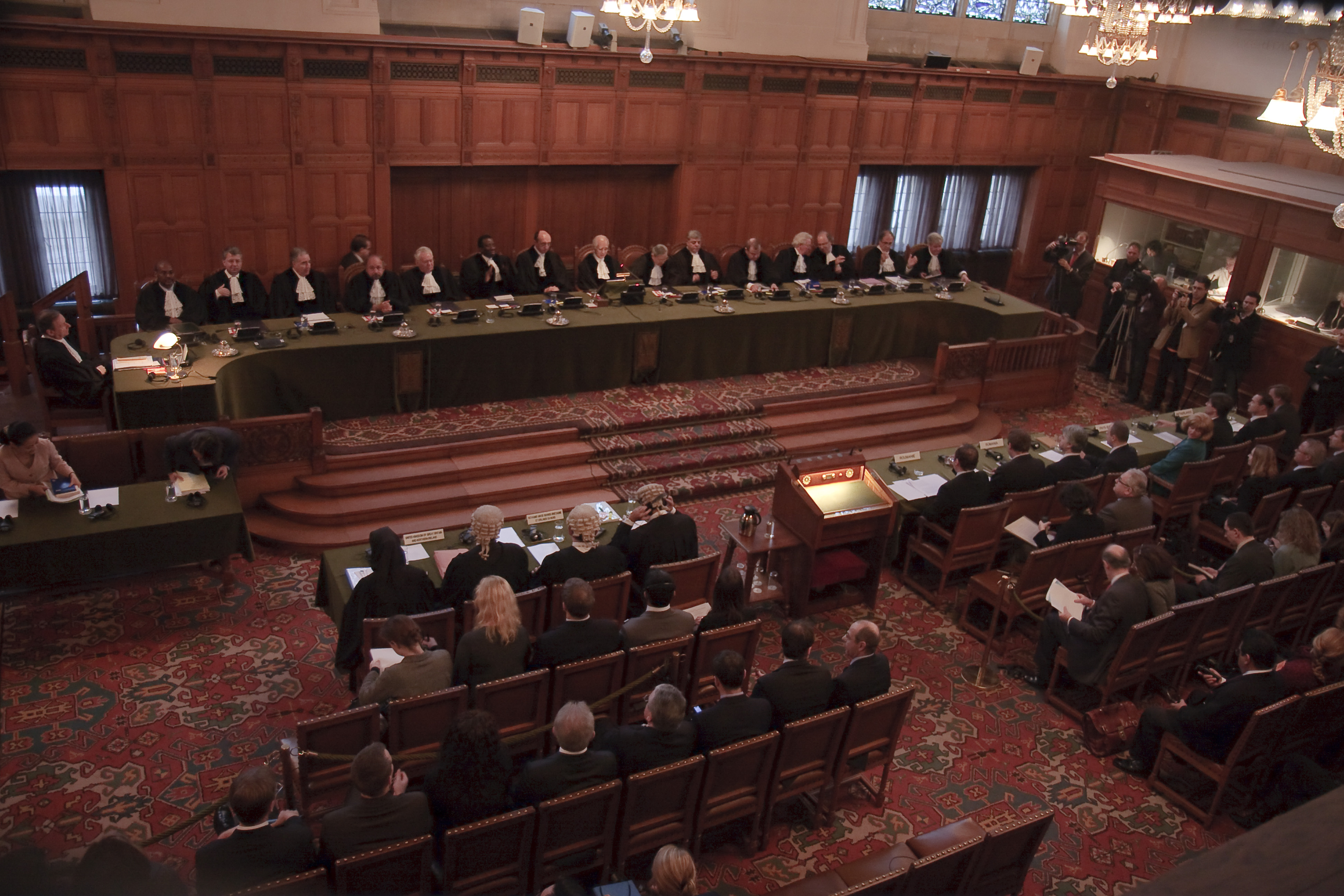
The International Court of Justice

A court (or court of law) is an institution, often a government entity, with the authority to adjudicate legal disputes between parties and administer justice in civil, criminal, and administrative matters in accordance with the rule of law.

Courts generally consist of judges or other judicial officers, and are usually established and dissolved through legislation enacted by a legislature. Courts may also be established by constitution or an equivalent constituting instrument.

The practical authority given to the court is known as its jurisdiction, which describes the court's power to decide certain kinds of questions, or petitions put to it. There are various kinds of courts, including trial courts, appellate courts, administrative courts, international courts, and tribunals.

== Description ==
A court is any person or institution, often as a government institution, with the authority to adjudicate legal disputes between parties and carry out the administration of justice in civil, criminal, and administrative matters in accordance with the rule of law. In both common law and civil law legal systems, courts are the central means for dispute resolution, and it is generally understood that all people have an ability to bring their claims before a court. Similarly, the rights of those accused of a crime include the right to present a defense before a court.

The system of courts that interprets and applies the law is collectively known as the judiciary. The place where a court sits is known as a venue. The room where court proceedings occur is known as a courtroom, and the building as a courthouse; court facilities range from simple and very small facilities in rural communities to large complex facilities in urban communities.

The practical authority given to the court is known as its jurisdiction (from Latin iūrisdictiō, from iūris, "of the law", + dīcō, "to declare", + -tiō, noun-forming suffix), the court's power to decide certain kinds of questions or petitions put to it. According to William Blackstone's Commentaries on the Laws of England, a court (for civil wrongs) is constituted by a minimum of three parties: the āctor or plaintiff, who complains of an injury done; the reus or defendant, who is called upon to make satisfaction for it; and the jūdex or judicial power, who is to examine the truth of the fact, determine the law arising upon that fact, and, if any injury appears to have been done, ascertain and by its officers apply a legal remedy. It is also usual in the superior courts to have barristers, and attorneys or counsel, as assistants, though, often, courts consist of additional barristers, bailiffs, reporters, and perhaps a jury.

== Etymology ==
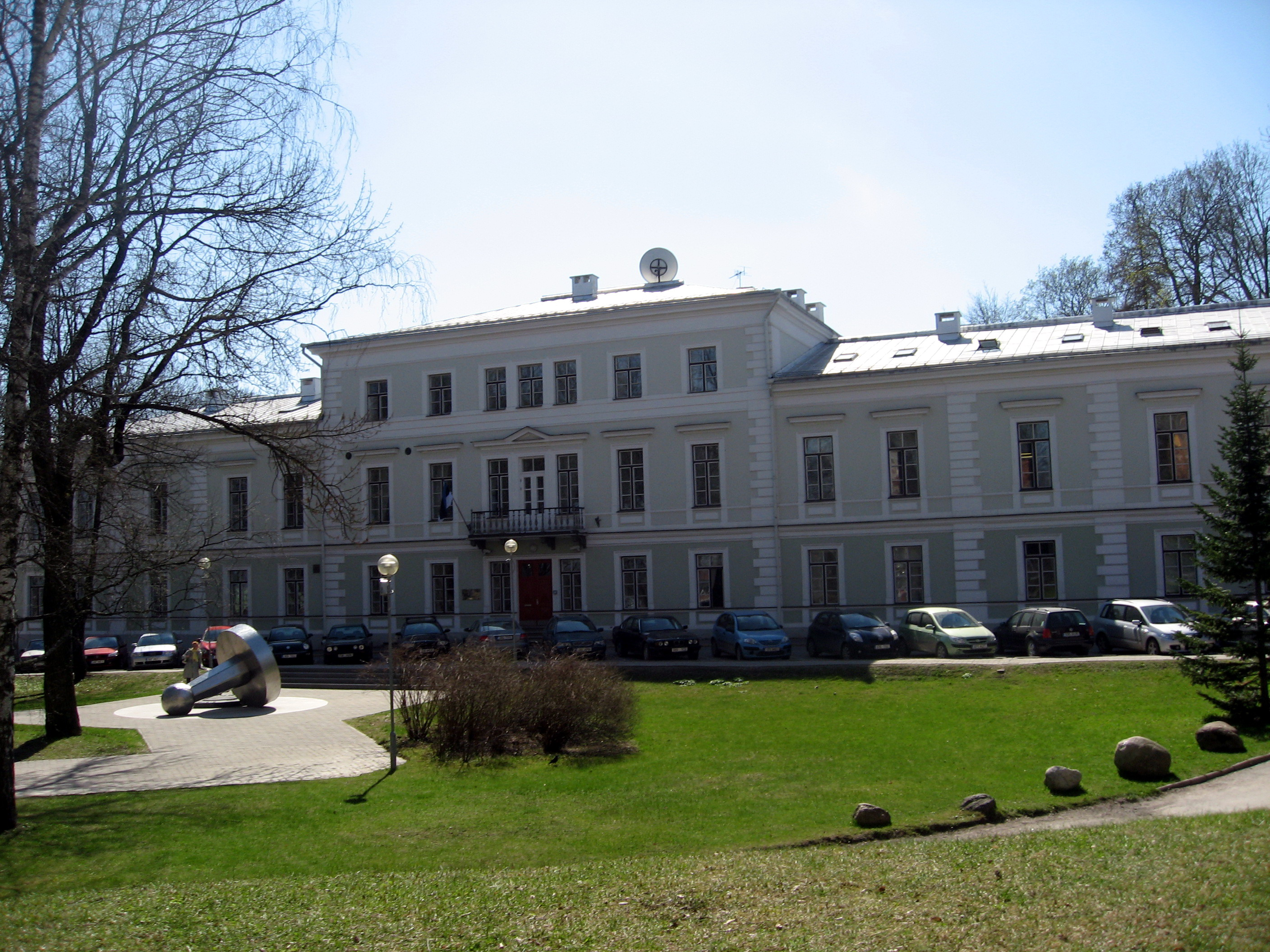
The building of the Supreme Court of Estonia in Tartu

The word court comes from the French cour, an enclosed yard, which derives from the Latin form cōrtem, the accusative case of cohors, which again means an enclosed yard or the occupants of such a yard. The English word court is thus a descendant of the Latin word hortus from Ancient Greek χόρτος (khórtos) (meaning "garden", hence horticulture and orchard), both referring to an enclosed space.

The meaning of a judicial assembly is first attested in the 12th century, and derives from the earlier usage to designate a sovereign and his entourage, which met to adjudicate disputes in such an enclosed yard. The verb "to court", meaning to win favor, derives from the same source since people traveled to the sovereign's court to win his favor.

The term the court is used to refer to the presiding officer or officials, usually one or more judges. The judge or panel of judges may also be collectively referred to as "the bench" (in contrast to attorneys and barristers, collectively referred to as "the bar"). In the United States, the legal authority of a court to take action is based on personal jurisdiction over the parties to the litigation and subject-matter jurisdiction over the claims asserted.

The system of courts that interprets and applies the law is collectively known as the judiciary. The place where a court sits is known as a venue. The room where court proceedings occur is known as a courtroom, and the building as a courthouse; court facilities range from simple and very small facilities in rural communities to large complex facilities in urban communities.

== Jurisdiction ==
The Court House of Kavala, Greece

The practical authority given to the court is known as its jurisdiction (from Latin iūrisdictiō, from iūris, "of the law", + dīcō, "to declare", + -tiō, noun-forming suffix), the court's power to decide certain kinds of questions or petitions put to it. According to William Blackstone's Commentaries on the Laws of England, a court (for civil wrongs) is constituted by a minimum of three parties: the āctor or plaintiff, who complains of an injury done; the reus or defendant, who is called upon to make satisfaction for it; and the jūdex or judicial power, who is to examine the truth of the fact, determine the law arising upon that fact, and, if any injury appears to have been done, ascertain and by its officers apply a legal remedy. It is also usual in the superior courts to have barristers, and attorneys or counsel, as assistants, though, often, courts consist of additional barristers, bailiffs, reporters, and perhaps a jury. Jurisdiction is defined as the official authority to make legal decisions and judgements over a person or material item within a territory.

"Whether a given court has jurisdiction to preside over a given case" is a key question in any legal action. Three basic components of jurisdiction are personal jurisdiction over an individual or thing (rēs), jurisdiction over the particular subject matter (subject-matter jurisdiction) and territorial jurisdiction. Jurisdiction over a person refers to the full authority over a person regardless of where they live, jurisdiction over a particular subject matter refers to the authority over the said subject of legal cases involved in a case, and lastly territorial jurisdiction is the authority over a person within an x amount of space.

Other concepts of jurisdiction include general, exclusive, appellate, and (in the United States federal courts) diversity jurisdiction.

== Types and organization of courts ==
Courts may be organized into a hierarchy of courts and have specific jurisdiction and include specialized courts.

=== Trial and appellate courts ===
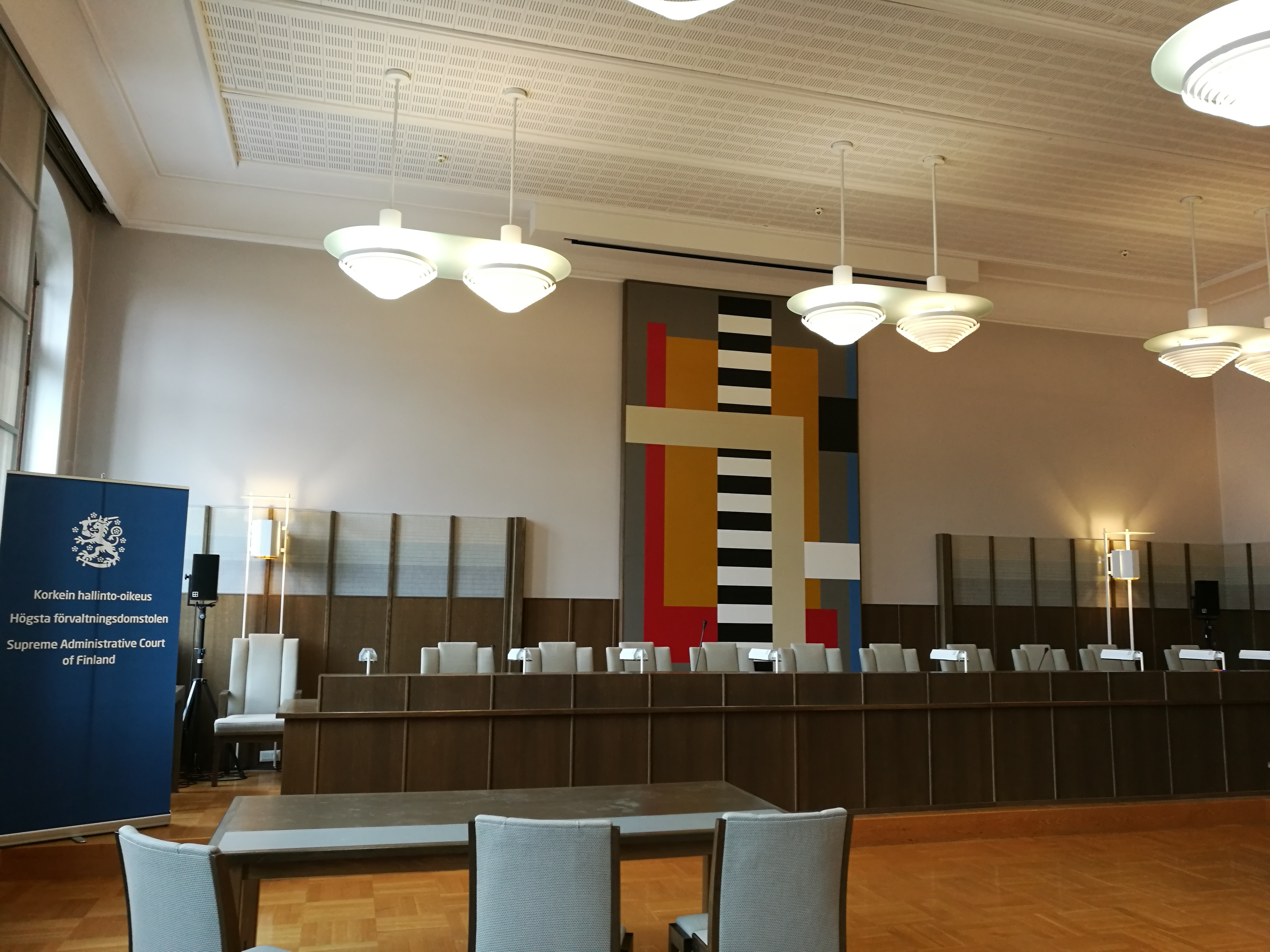
A courtroom of the Supreme Administrative Court of Finland

Trial courts are courts that hold trials. Sometimes termed "courts of first instance", trial courts have varying original jurisdiction. Trial courts may conduct trials with juries as the finders of fact (these are known as jury trials) or trials in which judges act as both finders of fact and finders of law (in some jurisdictions these are known as bench trials). Juries are less common in court systems outside the Anglo-American common law tradition.

Appellate courts are courts that hear appeals of lower courts and trial courts.

Some courts, such as the Crown Court in England and Wales, may have both trial and appellate jurisdictions.

=== Civil law courts and common law courts ===
The two major legal traditions of the western world are the civil law courts and the common law courts. These two great legal traditions are similar, in that they are products of western culture, although there are significant differences between the two traditions. Civil law courts are profoundly based upon Roman law, specifically a civil body of law entitled Corpus Juris Civilis. This theory of civil law was rediscovered around the end of the eleventh century and became a foundation for university legal education starting in Bologna, Italy and subsequently being taught throughout continental European universities.

Civil law is firmly ensconced in the French and German legal systems. Common law courts were established by English royal judges of the King's Council after the Norman Invasion of Britain in 1066. The royal judges created a body of law by combining local customs they were made aware of through traveling and visiting local jurisdictions. This common standard of law became known as "Common Law". This legal tradition is practiced in the English and American legal systems. In most civil law jurisdictions, courts function under an inquisitorial system. In the common law system, most courts follow the adversarial system. Procedural law governs the rules by which courts operate: civil procedure for private disputes (for example); and criminal procedure for violation of the criminal law. In recent years, international courts are being created to resolve matters not covered by the jurisdiction of national courts. For example, the International Criminal Court, based in The Hague, in the Netherlands, or the Court of Permanent Lok Adalat (Public Utility Services), based in India.

=== International courts ===
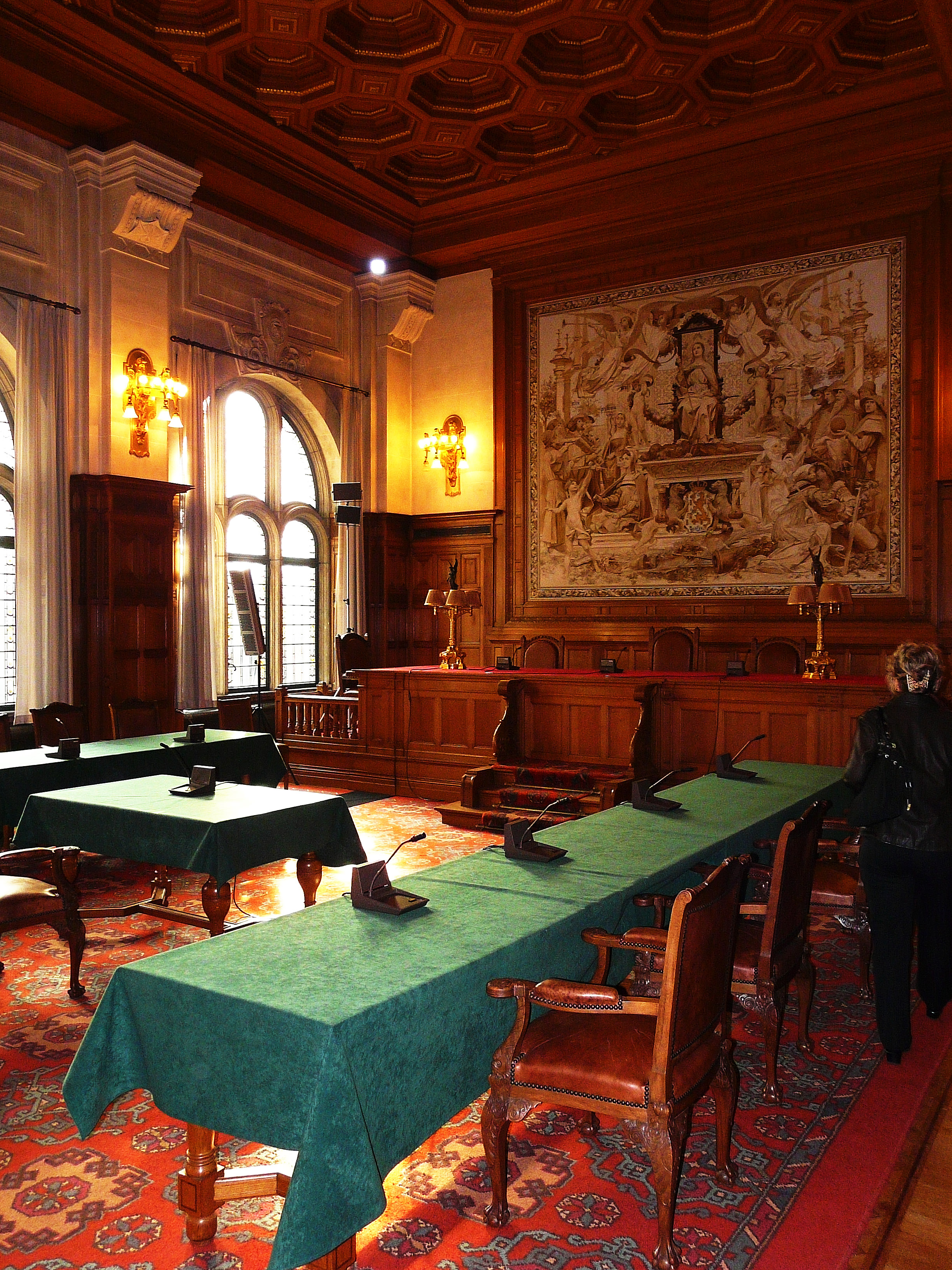
A courtroom of the Permanent Court of Arbitration of the United Nations.

- International judicial institution
- International Court of Justice
- International Criminal Court
- International Court of Arbitration

=== List of types and organization of courts ===
- Administrative court
- Admiralty court
- Appellate court
- Circuit court
- City court
- Constitutional court
- Commercial court
- Community court
- Court of cassation
- Court of marine inquiry
- Court of record
- Court-martial
- District court
- Domestic violence court
- Drug court
- DWI court
- Ecclesiastical court
- Equity court
- Extraordinary court
- Family court
- Girl's court
- High court
- International court
- Juvenile court
- Labor court
- Land court
- Livability court
- Lower court
- Mental health court
- Ordinary court
- Patent court
- Probate court
- Small claims court
- Specialized court
- Superior court
- Supreme court
- Tax court
- Teen court
- Trial court
- Veterans' court

== Opinion polls ==
Opinion polls show citizens tend to value impartiality, user-friendliness of courts, and speedy trials.

== Court television shows ==
Television show courts, which are often not part of the judicial system and are generally private arbitrators, are depicted within the court show genre; however, the courts depicted have been criticized as misrepresenting real-life courts of law and the true nature of the legal system. Notable court shows include:

- Caso Cerrado
- Eye for an Eye
- Judge Alex
- Judge Joe Brown
- Judge Judy
- Judge Mathis
- Judge Rinder
- Paternity Court
- The People's Court

== See also ==
- Courtroom
- Kangaroo court
- Sentencing disparity
