= Specialized court =

Court with specific subject-matter jurisdiction

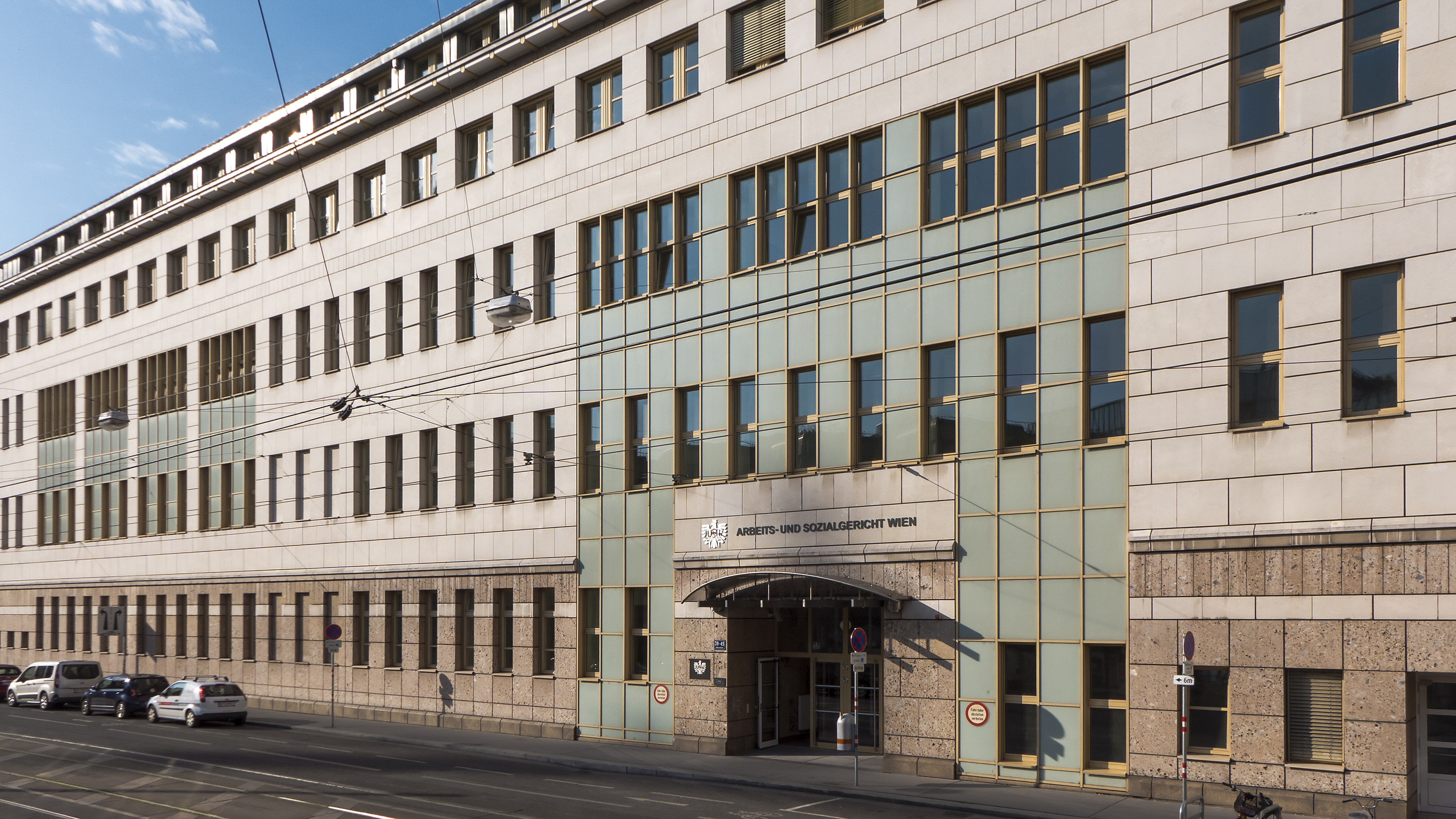
Arbeits- und Sozialgericht in Vienna, Austria is specialized court as both Labor court and Social court

Specialized court is a type of court with limited subject-matter jurisdiction concerning particular field of law, compared to 'ordinary court' with general subject-matter jurisdiction. This concept of court usually includes administrative court or family court.

== Specialized courts by country ==
=== Austria ===
Under hierarchical chain of ordinary courts compared to administrative courts in Austria, specialized court (German: Fachgerichtsbarkeit) for specific jurisdictions, including court on cartel cases (German: Kartellgericht) and court on employment - social welfare cases (German: Arbeits- und Sozialgericht) are established in Vienna.

=== China ===
Judiciary in the People's Republic of China includes the courts of special jurisdiction, translated as 'Specialized court' including matters concerning the military, national railway system and maritime disputes.

=== India ===
In India, various types of specialized tribunals are established for each of specific matters, including offences Relating to Transactions in Securities, Atrocities against Scheduled Caste and Scheduled Tribes, consuming Narcotic Drugs, violation on NIA act, Corruption. Supreme court has also setup 12 fast track special courts to exclusively deal with cases involving with MLA/MPs.

=== United Kingdom ===
The judiciary of United Kingdom includes courts and tribunals for specific subject-matter jurisdictions, such as Employment Tribunal in England and Wales and Scotland, Family Court in England and Wales.

=== United States ===
In the United States, specialized courts, or specialty courts are courts that aim to rehabilitate generally non-violent and low-rate offenders by including specifically trained professionals pertaining to the field of specialty court. The purpose of these specialized courts is to acknowledge and handle criminal activity at the source. Special courts in United States can handle both civil and criminal disputes. Some examples of different specialized courts include DWI court, drug court, mental health court, sex trafficking court, domestic violence court, truancy court, family court, mental health court, and traffic court and veterans treatment court. Drug courts are separated into categories such as adult drug court, juvenile drug court, DWI court, and veteran's treatment court.

Traditional courts focus on what happened, decide whether the person committed a crime, and punish the person proportionately. Specialized courts focus on reducing future rearrests and rehabilitation. For instance, drug court aims to reduce criminal activity by mandating that the offender stay clean from drugs and mandating drug treatment therapy. These specialized courts usually involve the help of the prosecutor, judge, probation, law enforcement, mental health professionals, social service agencies, and relevant treatment.

==== Adult drug court in the US ====
Drug court generally involves evaluating risk level and accommodating with proportionate supervision, drug testing, therapy, inpatient drug rehabilitation, and outpatient drug rehabilitation. Some examples of general proportionate accommodation for offenders convicted under drug court would be mandated treatment under Alcoholics Anonymous, Narcotics Anonymous, addiction treatment centers, and specialized therapy by a substance abuse therapist. The criteria that must be met for adult drug court includes being over 18 at the time of the offense, United States citizen, guilty plea to a non-violent felony offense, no prior violent offenses, diagnosed chemical dependency, and willingness to comply with drug court. The purpose of drug court is to advance public safety and healthy communities by creating collaborative responses to crimes committed by individuals who suffer from chemical dependency. The argued reason for using drug court for drug offenders is that this method addresses some of the root causes of their criminal activity.

==== Veterans' court in the US ====
In 2008, the first veterans' court was created. Of the older such courts, usually Article I tribunals, is the Court of Appeals for the Armed Forces which was founded in 1951 and functions as an appeal court for military and economic offences.

== See also ==
- Court
- Ordinary court
- Extraordinary court
- Administrative court
- Admiralty court
- Business court
- Consumer court
- Community court
- Drug court
- Family court
- Juvenile court
- Labor court
- Patent court
- Social security tribunal
- Tax court
- Veterans' court
