= Robert T. Russell =

American lawyer

Robert T. Russell, Jr. is a City Court Judge in Buffalo, New York. He is credited with creating the first veterans' court in the United States. A veterans' court is a specialized court designed to accommodate issues that are unique to veterans, such as post-traumatic stress disorder caused by combat experience. Since his creation of the first veterans' court in 2008, several other similar courts have been created throughout the United States.

In April, 2010 Russell won accolades from United States Secretary of Veterans Affairs Eric Shinseki.
