= Sequential intercept model =

Psychiatric model

The Sequential Intercept Model clarifies five points at which standard processing of crimes can be intervened with community-based actions, so that individuals with mental and psychiatric disorders would not have to further penetrate the criminal justice system. By understanding and using the model, communities can develop a series of strategies to increase diversion of individuals with mental disorder from the criminal justice system and to help them receive proper community-based treatments.

Traced from the early 1990s, the Sequential Intercept Model was first established in Summit County through the collaboration of Munetz, Griffin and Steadman due to the trend of increasing number of criminals with mental health problems appeared. Summit County developed partnerships with the National GAINS centre to launch programs for community-based mental health services. After the success of Summit County, the model was implemented at the regional and state level starting from Pennsylvania and continuously spread to other states with larger task force using this model to illustrate and solve related issues. And finally, it was used in certain policies under the federal level particularly the veterans’ psychological issues and their associated medical treatments.

As an effective conceptual tool, the Sequential Intercept Model could be applied to many real-life situations. A significant example is the application for juvenile justice system with two intercepts within the model involved. The diversion programs at schools for students’ behaviour management would be conducted at first and problem-solving courts from Intercept 3 could also be used to provide treatments for teenagers. Meanwhile, researchers and policymakers could also apply the methods within the Sequential Intercept Model for future use.

== Description ==
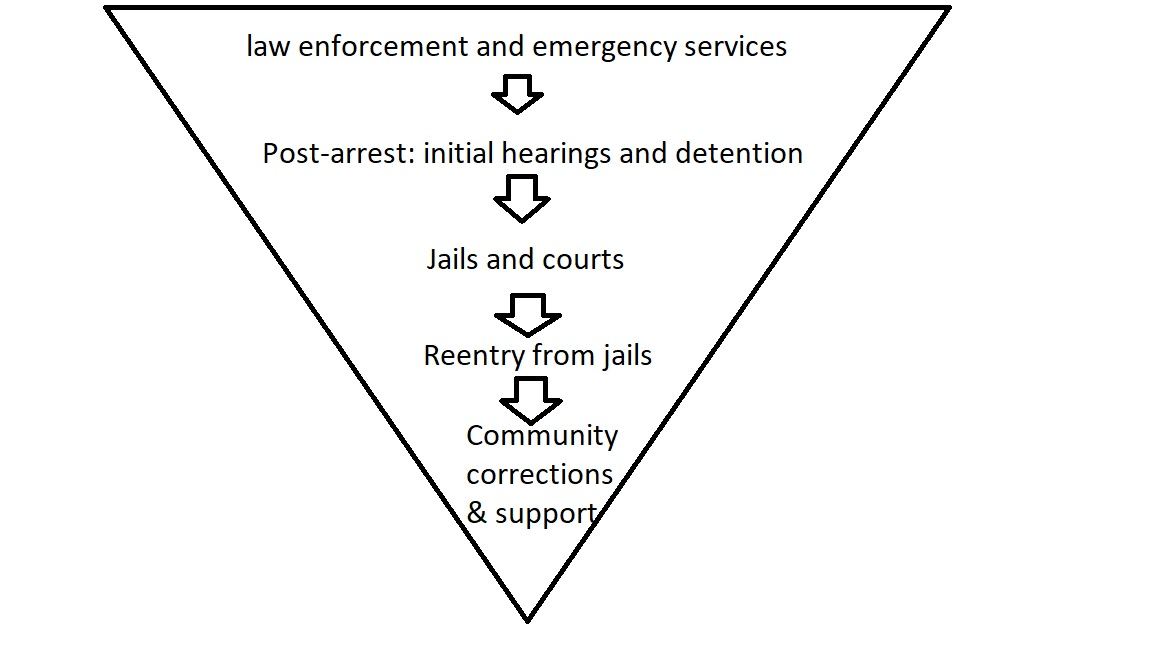
Flow of five points of interception within the Sequential Intercept Model

There are five points of interception within the Sequential Intercept Model where interventions can be conducted at each point to prevent further criminalisation of population with mental illness.

=== Intercept 1 ===
The first intercept refers to law enforcement and emergency services. Police officers initially make critical decisions to decide whether an individual is innocent or should be arrested, however, many complex situations have occurred within the police management for mental health crisis due to lack of time and experience. That is when a program called specialised policing responses (SPRs) is developed by law enforcement agencies through collaborations with other mental health services providers to prioritise transfer of people to receive mental health treatments rather than getting arrested. The objective of this level of intercept is therefore to provide people who have behavioural health disorders with proper therapies instead of sending them into the next level of criminal justice system.

=== Intercept 2 ===
The second intercept refers to post-arrest actions during initial hearings or detention, which offer diversion programs for arrested individuals from encountering standard trial and judgement. For example, probation could be conducted for those individuals with mental disease by employing experts during hearings to assess the mental conditions of the arrested people and determining the possible options for those people, such as further psychological treatments within the mental health system, instead of going to jail.

=== Intercept 3 ===
The third intercept occurs after the initial hearings or detention and is associated with jails and courts. According to research, people with mental disorder have higher chances of being taken into custody and are always charged with longer incarceration than people without mental disorder. Hence, approaches within the local community, particularly problem-solving courts in the condemnation process have been increasing throughout the world. For example, the community courts would use the information collected from neighbourhood to find out the underlying causes of the criminals’ illegal behaviours related to mental illness or divert those criminals from jails into community-based mental health treatment to reduce the probability of the recurrence of crimes.

=== Intercept 4 ===
The fourth intercept aims to facilitate successful re-entry into the society after the release from jails by experiencing proper mental illness management from community-based interventions and hence reduce the rates of recidivism. In fact, it is common for population with mental health disorder to fail to follow the conditions of probation and result in being rearrested into the prisons. Therefore, models within this stage of intervention could be used to guide the successful re-entry process for those with mental health issues . Take the example of the ACTION approach, by promoting systematic communication and collaboration, providers are well educated about the behaviours, experiences and needs for offenders with mental illness. They would also know about how services from communities could significantly contribute to the promotion of criminal justice. A cross-systems map is therefore developed and implemented to guide successful re-entry of mental disorder criminals into the community.

=== Intercept 5 ===
The fifth intercept refers to community-based corrections and support, with an emphasis on community control of individuals with mental illness after imprisonment. According to Bureau of Justice Statistics, at year-end 2016, 4.5 million people in the United States were under community supervision or probation. Due to increasing number of this type of population, community probation and parole programs are designed to increase these individuals’ participation in mental health treatment. These mandatory treatments would therefore reduce the possibility of failure of probation and reduce the number of individuals returning to the prisons again after releasing from incarceration.

== Development ==
The development of the Sequential Intercept Model could be traced back to early 1990s when Summit County in Ohio, United States realised that there were increasing population with mental health problems arrested and there was also increasing demand for mental health related services in jails and prisons. Due to the lack of appropriate method to deal with this issue, in 1999, the Summit County developed collaboration with the National GAINS Centre to initiate a CIT program, which provided police officers necessary trainings on dealing with mental health issues and raised awareness for responders about the alternatives of community-based treatments for arrested people with mental illness.

Two years after the effective implementation of CIT program in Summit County, the Sequential Intercept Model (SIM) had spread to the state level with the five south-eastern countries in Pennsylvania working together using SIM as a tool to address the criminalisation of people with mental disorder. Then at the same year, Munetz gave a speech about how this model works in a systematic way with multiple levels involved and the five intercepts that follow the process of the criminal justice system were identified. With the exact identification of the process of the SIM, larger task force started to use this model in criminology and psychology areas. By discussing about the status of each intercept in each country in monthly meetings, the task force established common understandings towards the connection between mental illness and community treatment, and then started its attempts in different regions and states.

Federal level implementation of the Sequential Intercept Model

Finally, the SIM was also implemented at the federal level with the U.S Department of Veterans Affairs using the SIM in its policies to prevent the veterans with mental illness from entering deeper into the criminal justice system. For instance, a program called Veterans Justice Outreach was developed to collect information needed for veterans’ medical treatment and communicate the related information with local courts and jails so that the experts in VA could ensure veterans’ access to healthcare services as soon as possible.

== Application ==
=== Juvenile justice system ===
The Sequential Intercept Model (SIM) has not only been applied to adults, it could also be used in the juvenile justice system associated with its community-based actions. There are two intercepts within the model that are involved.

The first intercept could be conducted at schools along with the diversion programs before arrest. In the past, the schools would often expel or suspend the children and teenagers who disobeyed the school rules, such as fighting with others, and sometimes even reported these students to the police department. To make this situation better, the SIM could be applied to implement diversion programs on these students, for instance, after-school programs designed for management and promotion of well behaviour. These diversion programs would help analyse the potential reasons of the students’ bad behaviours, such as genetically related mental health issues, and provide them with proper treatment instead of sending the students directly to receive law punishments. One of the most successful examples of this level of intercept is the establishment of The Philadelphia Police School Diversion Program started in 2014, whose aim was to decrease the number of students who are arrested in Philadelphia schools because of inappropriate school behaviours and provide them with proper school-based treatment so they would improve their behaviour and avoid going to jails.

In addition, the problem-solving courts within Intercept 3 are crucial and adaptable in the juvenile justice system. The primary objective of juvenile courts is to reintegrate teenagers to certain sentences or punishment; however, these courts are turning more punitive without taking into consideration of the individuals’ behavioural health problems, which would seriously influence the future behaviour of these criminals. To ensure a more valid juvenile justice system, juvenile mental health courts (JMHCs) are applied to divert youngsters with mental illness from the standard trial and instead provide them with proper mental illness treatment within the community. By developing close partnerships with local mental health services agencies, JMHCs have managed to illustrate mental illness issues and have tried to reduce the possibility of recidivism of these youths. JMHCs also emphasise on the participation of youths’ family members so that teenagers who committed crimes can receive guidance from the closest people around them and are more likely to become better in the future.

== Future directions ==
=== Extension of the use of the Sequential Intercept Model ===
The initial emphasis of the Sequential Intercept Model (SIM) is on individuals who suffer from serious mental and behavioural health problems, however, it is possible for SIM to extend to other populations, such as veterans and teenagers who experience substance use disorder as well as people who suffer from intellectual disabilities. Under effective cross-systems collaboration and management, such as the Cross-Systems Mapping workshops where collaborative communication and understanding were undertaken for direct guidance into the criminal justice system, the SIM could provide options of community treatments instead of standard incarceration for increasing number of individuals with behavioural health problems or substance use disorder.

=== Research implications ===
On one hand, research on the sharing of basic information related to community-based treatment alternatives is necessary. To ensure effective operations of diversion programs, it is important to share information about individuals who received mental health treatments in one of the intercepts of the SIM. However, the information collected and shared is often inappropriate or misleading since it is based on the restrictions of certain federal laws and it is not supported by enough evidence. This requires further research on relevant issues that would possibly occur when dealing with mental disorder people in the criminal justice system, for instance, the limitations or disadvantages of the information sharing when interventions and related programs are conducted during the process of the use of the SIM. By researching on the shared information, the programs and interventions within the SIM would turn out appropriately to ensure the balance between privacy rights and community safety. Research conducted by Anne Hays Egan for Presbyterian Healthcare Services analyzed a growing body of data from the Vera Institute of Justice, U.S. Substance Abuse Mental Health Agency (SAMHSA), LEAD National Support BUreau, and the Drug Policy Institute, which demonstrates that recidivism is substantially decreased when diversion, alternative sentencing, and transition from jail to community are accompanied by intensive case management and recovery supports, affordable housing, and living wage employment.

On the other hand, it is useful to conduct research on the costs and benefits of community-based treatment options. For further development of the programs and intercepts within the SIM, consistent funding from outside parties is required. But the information regarding costs of community diversion programs is not enough and it does not take into consideration of the public safety issues, which would contribute to lack of support for the ongoing implementation of diversion programs and interventions towards the criminal justice system.

=== Policy implications ===
The use of the SIM implies changes of policy in the related areas. One of the most significant examples is the Cross-Systems Mapping (CSM) workshops, which implement practices of community-based treatments for criminals with mental disorder using collaborative understandings towards the connection between criminal justice and mental health. The CSM workshops promote interactions between judiciary, law enforcement, probation, mental health and community treatment, which enables the authority to change policy by cross-mapping the whole system using the SIM. Furthermore, the SIM can have considerable impact on the judicial or law-making courts by illustrating a conceptual framework that emphasises on the reform of individuals with mental illness with a more focused law towards community-based treatment instead of imprisonment.

The SIM was included in the 21st Century Cures Act. Furthermore, the Bureau of Justice Assistance made SIM a priority for Justice and Mental Health Collaboration Program grants.

== See also ==
- criminal justice
- Rehabilitation (penology)
- Forensic psychology
- Forensic psychiatry
- Forensic psychotherapy
- Crime analysis
- criminology
- law enforcement
