= Buffalo Veterans Treatment Court =

Veterans' court in Buffalo, New York, USA

Coordinates: 42.883988°N 78.876117°W

The Buffalo Veterans Treatment Court is a judicial "veterans' court" which was first established in 2008 in Buffalo, New York, USA, as part of the Erie County court system. The court, which bills itself as a "hybrid drug and mental health court", is considered the first of its kind in American law services, and was established in order to provide a civil court which tries cases involving veterans of the United States Armed Forces, based upon the belief that a large proportion of veterans from present and past conflicts have experienced hardships which are unique to their former service in the military.

The current judge of the court is Justice Robert T. Russell.

== Backing ==
The court is an initiative of the Western New York (WNY) Veterans Project, Buffalo Police Department, the Buffalo Veteran’s Administration Health Care System, the Buffalo Criminal Courts, the Buffalo Drug and Mental Health Treatment Courts, Erie County Pre-trial Services and the C.O.U.R.T.S. Program (Court Outreach Unit Referral and Treatment Service).

== Other veterans treatment courts ==
The movement for more veterans' courts has developed in other parts of the United States, with the Monroe County, New York Veterans court opening its first session in 2009. There is also a Veteran's Court system in place in Pennsylvania that supports the unique challenges faced by Veterans and works to divert veterans from the criminal justice system towards Behavioral Health support.
