= Death of Anurag Tiwari =

Indian civil servant killed in 2017

Anurag Tiwari (also known as Anurag Tewari), was an IAS officer of Karnataka cadre. He was found dead in Lucknow on 17 May 2017. His death was investigated by the Central Bureau of Investigation (CBI).

In 2019, the CBI submitted a report to its special court claiming that he died from an "accidental fall", which caused him to experience suffocation. The investigation took around twenty months since the CBI began investigation in 2017 or later. However, his family members declined the submitted report alleging he was murdered due to his role in multi-crore scam in food and civil supplies in Bengaluru where he was appointed as a commissioner.
