= Incarceration prevention in the United States =

Methods to reduce prison populations in America

Incarceration prevention refers to a variety of methods aimed at reducing prison populations and costs while fostering enhanced social structures. Due to the nature of incarceration in the United States today caused by issues leading to increased incarceration rates, there are methods aimed at preventing the incarceration of at-risk populations.

== Prison population and cost to society ==
Between 1998 and 2010, prison populations in the United States rose dramatically. This resulted in overcrowded facilities; increased expense to taxpayers; and potential loss of public funding for other community safety activities. Between 1982 and 2007, corrections expenditures increased by over 250 percent and in 2007 expenditure was over $74 billion. In 2010, the number of youths in detention facilities was 61,423. By the end of 2012, approximately 2,228,400 individuals were incarcerated in jails and prisons, about 4,781,300 individuals were under some form of community supervision (such as probation or parole), and a total of approximately 6,937,600 individuals were under some form of correctional supervision (1 in 35 adults). The average cost of the incarceration of an individual in 2012 was approximately $31,286 per year with a range of $14,603 to $60,076.

As of October 2015, the United States has the second highest incarceration rate in the world with 698 per 100,000 population. Compared to other locations, 55% of countries and territories have prison rates lower than 155 per 100,000 population. The average cost of incarceration rose to $31,977.65 in 2015.

== Factors contributing to incarceration rates ==
=== Substance use disorder prevention or treatment ===
Between 1980 and 2005, the number of inmates incarcerated for drug-related crimes increased by 1,000 percent. In 2012, sixty-five percent of inmates reported a substance addiction or dependence issue. Seventy-eight percent of violent crimes and eighty-three percent of property crimes involved drugs. A greater amount of money is spent on incarceration than on prevention and treatment, despite research showing that treating drug addictions is more cost-effective than incarceration. According to the National Institute on Drug Abuse, a full year of drug treatment costs approximately $4,700 compared to over $30,000 for a year of imprisonment.

=== Mental health access/treatment ===
According to statistics produced by the U.S. Department of Justice in September 2006, over 45% of federal prisoners, 56% of state prisoners, and 64% of jail inmates are diagnosed with mental health problems. This suggests a direct correlation between a decrease in mental health services and facilities and an increase in mental health diagnoses in the prison system. A decrease in mental health funding has taken place on both the state and federal level, especially in changes in block grant funding as part of the Omnibus Reconciliation Act of 1981. The statewide support for mental health services has also seen significant cuts and has barely accounted for annual inflation. The overall shift from institution-based care to a community-based care model was one that many mental health advocates welcomed; however, the funding appropriated to support such programs was much less than initial estimates and has had a significant impact on the ability of the community care based model to be successful in providing adequate mental health treatment to those in need.

=== Education ===
68% of state prison inmates did not receive a high school diploma. Research indicates that schooling significantly reduces criminal activity. A significant portion of the effect of education on crime can be attributed to an increase in wages associated with schooling, suggesting that an increased level of education funding will result in decreased criminal activity.

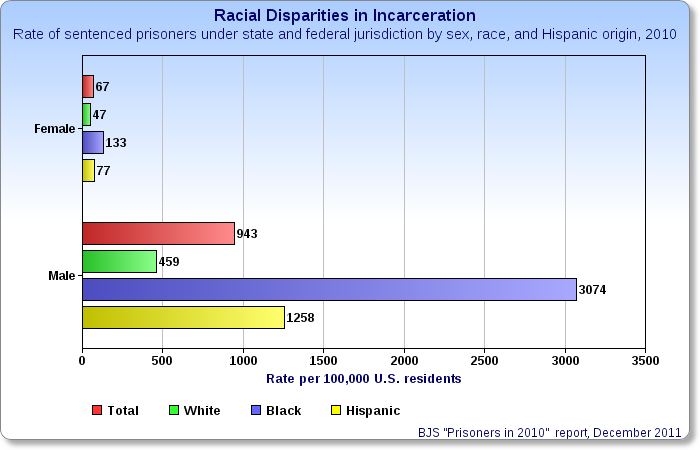
Counts based on prisoners with a sentence of more than 1 year. All estimates include persons under age 18.; "Total" includes American Indians, Alaska Natives, Asians, Native Hawaiians, other Pacific Islanders, and persons identifying as two or more races.; "Black" excludes persons of Hispanic or Latino origin.

=== Factors involving race ===
There are many factors that have direct connections with the rises in the incarcerated population, many of which relate to structural and societal biases that exist in America today. As it relates directly to race, the practice of racial profiling regards policies and personal biases that target minority racial groups and contribute to a greater proportion of minorities being incarcerated compared to the general population. Currently, over sixty percent of inmates in the United States are people of color. These practices have existed in the American Criminal Justice system for decades and although may have gained attention in recent years, still find ways to increase the likelihood of certain demographic groups receiving negative attention from the likes of law enforcement.

=== The war on drugs and longer prison sentences ===
Beginning in the Nixon administration, the war on drugs resulted in stricter drug laws including longer prison sentences for drug use and possession. The Bureau of Justice Statistics reports that the drug offender population in federal prisons rose by 63% from 1998 to 2012 and they accounted for 52% of federal prisoners by 2012. 35% of these drug offenders were not reoffenders or had minimal criminal backgrounds.

In relation, mandatory minimum penalties have contributed to mass incarceration. The United States Sentencing Commission found that in 2016, 67.3% of offenders charged of a crime with a mandatory minimum penalty were convicted of a drug offense. The commission also found that in 2016, the average sentence length was 110 months in prison compared to 28 months for those charged of a crime with no mandatory minimum penalty.

== Incarceration prevention ==
Incarceration prevention refers to a variety of methods aimed at reducing prison populations and costs while fostering enhanced social structures for the improvement of society. Incarceration prevention can take place in any of three stages: Primary Prevention, Diversion, or Recidivism Prevention.

=== Prevention ===
Primary prevention is an attempt to reduce the risk of behaviors that potentially lead to incarceration. The initial stage in this model includes looking at system wide or systemic approaches that ensure people have consistent social and structural interactions.

A 1% Decrease in the Unemployment Rate Relates to the Following Decreases in the Crime Rate
Type of Crime	Percentage Decrease in Crime
Property Crime	1.6-2.4%
Violent Crime	.5%
Burglary	2%
Larceny	1.5%
Auto Theft	1%

==== Safety nets ====
Studies suggest that crime and violence are likely to be a byproduct of issues including economic inequality and poverty. Economic theory shows how property crime and violent crimes may partly be consequences of excessive inequality and poverty. Not only do crime rates increase with inequality, but propensity to commit crimes also increases with greater income inequality or poverty. It follows that programs which elevate families out of poverty decrease behaviors associated with crime. National data indicates that a 10% increase in real wages lowers the crime index by 13%.

==== Youth justice ====
Often, primary prevention can be viewed in the context of a school or vocational program in which there is a system of disciplinary action and reactions to behavioral issues. The goal is to institute preventive measures and different methods of support (i.e., restorative justice, restorative circles, proactive circles, and peer mediation) that encourage students/youth to meet the behavioral and academic standards set before them, without instituting harsh punitive measures that disengage students from educational and social resources provided within a school environment.

=== Diversion ===
Diversion is an attempt to circumvent incarceration and correct problem behaviors after an offense have been committed through alternatives to incarceration. This includes identifying those "most at risk" and setting in place additional supportive measures and strategies to provide opportunities for success.

In a school setting, this most often takes place after a young person has had multiple behavioral incidences within a short period of time and is at risk for more serious punitive measures. Steps for intervention may include (but are not limited to): additional counseling and support services, conflict resolution measures, peer-to-peer resolution groups, and engagement with community partners to provide additional services. The goal is to provide opportunities and support for those who show persistent behavioral issues, as they are most at-risk for future incarceration and/or legal trouble.

==== Deferred sentencing and jail diversion ====
Including but not limited to:

- Community Service: Community sentence or alternative sentencing or non-custodial sentence is a collective name in criminal justice for all the different ways, in which courts can punish someone convicted of committing an offense in ways other than prison terms.
- Drug courts: Drug courts operate under a model that combines intensive judicial supervision, mandatory drug testing, escalating sanctions and treatment to help substance abusers break the cycle of addiction and the crime that accompanies it.
- Mental health courts: Mental health courts link offenders who would ordinarily be prison-bound to long-term community-based treatment. They rely on mental health assessments, individualized treatment plans, and ongoing judicial monitoring to address both the mental health needs of offenders and public safety concerns of communities.
- Domestic violence courts: Specialized domestic violence courts are designed to improve victim safety and enhance defendant accountability. They emerged as problem-solving courts in the 1980s and 1990s in response to frustration among victim advocates, judges and attorneys who saw the same litigants cycling through the justice system.
- Problem-solving courts: Problem-solving courts address the underlying problems that contribute to criminal behavior and are a current trend in the legal system of the United States. There were over 2,800 problem-solving courts in 2008, intended to provide a method of resolving the problem in order to reduce recidivism.
- Restorative justice: Restorative justice uses dialogue to address the harm that has been done rather than relying solely on jail time as a means of justice.
- Electronic Monitoring: Electronic monitoring is a device that individuals under house arrest or parole are often required to wear. At timed intervals, the ankle monitor sends a radio frequency signal containing location and other information to a receiver. If an offender moves outside of an allowed range, the police will be notified.
- Fines/Probation: A deferred prosecution agreement is a voluntary alternative to adjudication in which a prosecutor agrees to grant amnesty in exchange for the defendant agreeing to fulfill certain requirements. Fulfillment of the specified requirements will then result in dismissal of the charges.
- Diversion programs: A diversion program in the criminal justice system is a form of sentencing and such programs are often run by a police department, court, a district attorney's office, or outside agency designed to enable offenders of criminal law to avoid criminal charges and a criminal record.

=== Recidivism prevention ===
Recidivism prevention takes place during incarceration and after release back into society. Its purpose is to reduce the risk of an individual reoffending and eventually returning into the prison system. National rates of recidivism over the last three decades have remained relatively steady at approximately 43 percent. The recommendations provided by the "Report of the Re-Entry Policy Council" coordinated by the "Council of State Governments" reflect the opportunities available for action by entities interested in reducing recidivism. According to the report, there are steps policy makers or practitioners should complete in order to ensure successful programs, such as collaboration, proper funding, system integration, and educating the public. The report also states that policy makers must also consider additional programming needs for incoming offenders, including intake procedures, physical and mental health care, drug treatment, and vocational training. Finally, the report emphasizes the need to address changes in social service delivery, such as housing, workforce development, treatment programs, and mental and physical healthcare systems.

==== Prison reform ====
Prison reform seeks to advocate for programming that gives offenders the tools they need for success. Physical and mental health, drug treatment, and educational and vocational programming give offenders the opportunity to begin the process of returning to their communities to become contributing members before they leave the facility.

==== Prisoner reentry initiatives ====
The overall purpose of such programs is to provide options, support, and opportunities for prisoners returning home into communities. The goal of preventing crime and reducing recidivism is attained through support programs including vocational and educational programs that provide returning citizens with the skills necessary to succeed in their reintegrated lives. The programs typically start by assessing strengths and risk factors through assessments when offenders begin their sentences, effective support and a plan for success that includes community support, and different strategies to help remediate skill and social deficiencies typically experienced by returning citizens.

== Juvenile confinement rates on steady decline ==
A study published by the Pew Institute found that there has been a significant decline in at least 37 states for juvenile commitment and violent crime arrest rates between 1997 and 2010. These decreases in juvenile commitments can be a result of many different factors, including unique programs like the Ohio RECLAIM (Reasonable Equitable Community and Local Alternatives to the Incarceration of Minors) program. This program provides financial incentives that encourage juvenile courts to find and develop community based strategies and programs options that seek to meet the needs of juvenile offenders or at risk offenders. This program works to focus the most critical resources for the most serious offenders, such as those committing violent crimes and the most serious of offenses, while encouraging courts to look into community and restorative program placements for the youth who commit crimes not fitting such severe categories. As a result, Ohio has seen a significant decrease in institutional crowding and an 80% decrease in Department of Youth Services (DYS) caseloads from its peak in 1997 to 2012.

== See also ==
- Prison abolition movement
- Drug liberalization
- Decriminalization
- Crime prevention
- Pretrial services programs
