= Center for Justice Innovation =

U.S. non-profit justice reform organization

Coordinates: 40.753665°N 73.991934°W

- Type: Nonprofit organization, think tank
- Headquarters: New York, New York, United States
- Director: Courtney Bryan
- Website: www.innovatingjustice.org
- Formerly called: Center for Court Innovation

The Center for Justice Innovation, formerly the Center for Court Innovation, is an American non-profit organization headquartered in New York, founded in 1996, with a stated goal of creating a more effective and human justice system by offering aid to victims, reducing crime and improving public trust in justice.

Originally founded as a public/private partnership between the New York State Unified Court System and the Fund for the City of New York, the Center for Justice Innovation creates operating programs to test new ideas and solve problems, performs original research to determine what works, and provides assistance to justice reformers around the world. The center's projects include community-based violence prevention projects, alternatives to incarceration, reentry initiatives, and court-based programs such as the Midtown Community Court and Red Hook Community Justice Center as well as drug courts, reentry courts, domestic violence courts, mental health courts and others. Their goal is to reduce the use of unnecessary incarceration and promote positive individual and family change.

The center works with jurisdictions around the U.S. and the rest of the world to disseminate lessons learned from innovative programs and provide hands-on assistance to criminal justice practitioners interested in the deployment of new research-based strategies to improve the delivery of justice. The center received an Innovations in American Government Award from the Ford Foundation and Harvard University. The center's first director was John Feinblatt, who went on to serve as a senior advisor to New York City Mayor Michael Bloomberg. From 2002 to 2020, Greg Berman served as director. The current leadership is executive director, Courtney Bryan, along with an advisory board.

== History ==
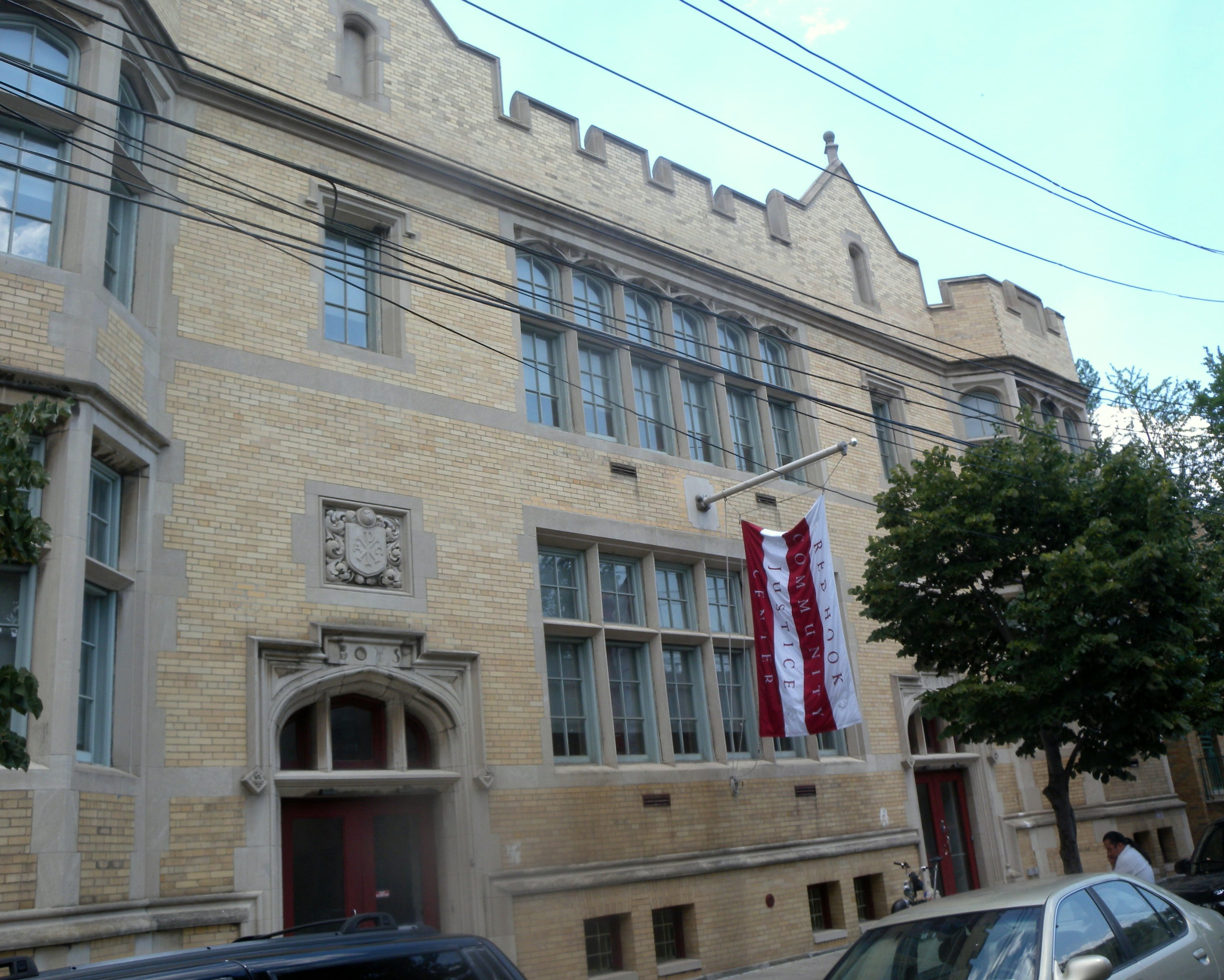
The Red Hook Community Justice Center

The Center for Court Innovation grew out of an experiment in judicial problem-solving. The Midtown Community Court was created in 1993 to address low-level charges around Times Square. The Midtown Court responds creatively, seeking sentences that are restorative to the victim, defendant, and community. The project's success in reducing both crime and incarceration led the court's planners, with the support of New York State's chief judge, to establish the Center for Court Innovation to serve as an engine for ongoing court reform in New York. According to former New York State Chief Judge Judith S. Kaye, "In creating the Center, we essentially adapted a model from the private sector: we chose to make an ongoing investment in research and development, and we chose to shield these functions from the daily pressures of managing the courts. The results have been unmistakable: the Center for Court Innovation has helped keep New York at the forefront of court reform for more than a decade."

The Center for Court Innovation has implemented and run over three dozen operating programs, many of which now function independently of the center. The Center for Court has also produced original research about hundreds of justice initiatives, and hosted tens of thousands of visitors interested in justice reform. Center planners collaborate with practitioners beyond New York, such as government leaders in Great Britain with a goal of replicating the Red Hook Community Justice Center in North Liverpool. Center planners have also worked with officials in San Francisco, who created a new community justice center to serve the city's Tenderloin neighborhood. Among other things, the center helped court planners in San Francisco complete an extensive community planning effort, including a needs assessment.

The center has received numerous awards for its efforts, including the Innovations in American Government Award from Harvard University and the Ford Foundation, the Peter F. Drucker Award for Nonprofit Innovation from Claremont Graduate University and the Prize for Public Sector Innovation from the Citizens Budget Commission.

== Programs ==
The Center for Court Innovation conceives, plans, and operates programs that seek to test new ideas, solve difficult problems, and achieve system change. Their projects include community-based violence prevention projects, alternatives to incarceration, reentry initiatives, and court-based programs that reduce the use of unnecessary incarceration and promote positive individual and family change. While the center's programs cover a broad range of topics and differ in size, the approach is always the same: thoughtful, collaborative planning, an emphasis on creativity, and the rigorous use of data to document results. The center's projects have achieved tangible results like safer streets, reduced levels of incarceration and fear, and improved neighborhood perceptions of justice.

Aside from the Midtown Community Court and Red Hook Community Justice Center, some of the center's other projects include the Harlem Community Justice Center, Bronx Community Solutions, Queens Youth Justice Center, Brooklyn Treatment Court, Youth Justice Board, Youth Courts, Newark Community Solutions, Brooklyn Mental Health Court, Parole Reentry Court, and Crown Heights Community Mediation Center.

One of their court-affiliated restorative justice programs, Circles for Safe Streets, facilitates discussions between drivers and the people they have injured during a traffic collision.

== Professional assistance ==
The Center for Court Innovation provides hands-on, expert assistance to reformers around the world, including judges, attorneys, justice officials, community organizations, and others. Experts from the center are available to help plan, implement and evaluate new policies, practices, and technologies. Their assistance takes many forms, including help with analyzing data, facilitating planning sessions, and hosting site visits to our operating programs in the New York City area.

The center has won national "requests for proposals" to provide technical assistance in a growing number of areas, including community prosecution, domestic violence, drug courts, technology, tribal justice, procedural justice, and institutionalizing problem-solving justice.

More than a dozen community courts have opened in South Africa, and staff from the center have also worked with officials from Scotland, Japan, Australia, Ireland, New Zealand and Canada on adapting the community court model.

The center has published dozens of how-to manuals and best practice guides for criminal justice officials, culling the lessons from successful justice innovations and disseminating them to the field. The center's web site was named a "Top 10" web site by Justice Served .

== Research ==
The center publishes research about its own experiments and innovative initiatives around the United States and world. Researchers at the center conduct independent evaluations, document how government systems work, how neighborhoods function, and how reform efforts create change. The purpose of the research is to identify best practices as well as strategies that do not work or can be improved.

In 2010, Urban Institute Press published Trial & Error in Criminal Justice Reform: Learning from Failure by Greg Berman and Aubrey Fox. In 2005, The New Press published Good Courts: The Case for Problem-Solving Justice. The first book to describe the problem-solving court movement in detail, Good Courts features profiles of Center demonstration projects, including the Midtown Community Court and the Red Hook Community Justice Center. "Sociologists and those within the legal system will no doubt be intrigued by this accessible and provocative call for change," Publishers Weekly said in its review. All authors’ proceeds from the book, which is being used in law schools and public policy classes, benefit the Center for Court Innovation. The center has also published the books Daring to Fail: First-Person Stories of Criminal Justice Reform, A Problem-Solving Revolution: Making Change Happen in State Courts, Documenting Results: Research on Problem-Solving Justice, and Personal Stories: Narratives from Across New York State.

== See also ==
- Problem-solving courts in the United States
- Restorative justice
- Therapeutic jurisprudence
