= Problem-solving courts in the United States =

Specialty courts designed to address offenders' criminogenic needs

Problem-solving courts (PSC) address the underlying problems that contribute to criminal behavior and are a current trend in the legal system of the United States. In 1989, a judge in Miami began to take a hands-on approach to drug addicts, ordering them into treatment, rather than perpetuating the revolving door of court and prison. The result was creation of drug court, a diversion program. That same concept began to be applied to difficult situations where legal, social and human problems mesh. There were over 2,800 problem-solving courts in 2008, intended to provide a method of resolving the problem in order to reduce recidivism.

== Efforts ==
Judith Kaye was Chief Judge of New York from 1993 to 2008 where she was most responsible for implementing court reform utilizing problem-solving courts in her state, one of the first in the nation. She also co-founded the Center for Court Innovation, a non-profit think tank headquartered in New York that helps courts and criminal justice agencies decrease crime, provide aid to victims and increase the public's confidence in the justice system.

Center for Court Innovation researchers explored whether problem-solving justice always requires a specialized court or if core principles and practices from these specialized courts are transferable to conventional courts. After interviewing judges, attorneys and representatives from probation departments and service providers, researchers concluded that a number of principles—such as judicial monitoring and linking offenders to services—could be transferable. The study, conducted in cooperation with the Collaborative Justice Courts Advisory Committee of the Judicial Council of California, was the first of its kind in the country. In 2005, The New Press published Good Courts: The Case for Problem-Solving Justice. The first book to describe the problem-solving court movement in detail, Good Courts features profiles of Center demonstration projects. The book is being used in law schools and public policy schools, due in part to a law school course on problem-solving justice that the Center piloted at Fordham Law School.

The National Association of Drug Court Professionals had more than 25,000 members working in 2,663 drug courts and 1,219 other problem-solving courts as of late 2011. Their annual conference offers education and training from experts for problem-solving professionals world-wide.

Programs have been established for teen court, DWI court, re-entry court, community court, domestic violence court, sex offense court, mental health court, and veterans' court.

== Principles ==
According to the Center for Court Innovation, there are six principles required for problem-solving courts to be effective. There must be better information available to the staff through training, and comprehensive defendant information for justice officials. Community engagement with the public will encourage cooperation of witnesses, jurors, and community watch groups, and foster trust. Collaboration between legal officials (judges/prosecutors/attorneys/probation officers), social service providers, victim groups and schools will keep everyone focused on the goal. Individualized Justice links offenders to the services they need and provides services for victims to aid in their recovery. Offenders must be held accountable with compliance monitoring and consequences for non-compliance. Outcomes need to be analyzed for cost versus benefit, and to provide continuous improvement of the process.

== Differences ==
Problem-solving courts look just like traditional courts, but defendants are referred to as "clients" and the judge has extensive knowledge about the client and talks with them directly. A client placed in a treatment program is monitored by the judge for months or years, and will return to court periodically to assess progress and/or problems. The judge can order the client to serve jail time as a punishment while in a treatment program, and the judge decides when the client is to be released from the program.

== Criticism ==
A 2005 article in the New York Times noted that because judges have total discretion, the results can be inconsistent. When that situation existed in the criminal justice system, mandatory sentencing guidelines were instituted. Legal scholars have warned that judges may also force their values upon defendants from different cultures. Those critical of the system say many treatment programs are unnecessarily harsh, and any deviation from the rules is punished.

Some public defenders have criticized the use of problem-solving courts because accused persons who accept intervention are implicitly treated as guilty; the courts do not allow an accused person to receive a determination of innocence or guilt. New York Supreme Court Judge James A. Yates has characterized their use as a trend toward "an inquisitorial system of justice".

Some studies have also found that people who enter and are unable to complete programs of treatment assigned by problem-solving courts face longer sentences than they would have faced had they remained in the traditional court system. Completion rates tend to be starkly unequal along lines of race, class, and health.

Judges in problem-solving courts need other skills beyond a knowledge of the law; they also must sometimes function as a social worker, therapist, and accountant. Law schools have only recently begun to provide courses on problem-solving justice, and New York Judge Fern Fisher commented that not all judges have the patience and attitude necessary to be effective.

== Federal guidance ==
The Bureau of Justice Assistance (BJA) is the branch of the U.S. Department of Justice tasked with proving the concept and providing guidelines to state court systems that seek to implement a program. The BJA identified ten projects and provided funding to demonstrate the theories in practice and document their results. They also provide hands-on assistance for any judicial entity seeking to establish a problem-solving court.
