= Teen court =

A teen court (sometimes called youth court or peer court) is a problem-solving court within the juvenile justice system where teens charged with certain types of offenses can be sentenced by a jury of same-aged peers. Their purpose is to provide an alternative disposition for juveniles who have committed a delinquent act, have committed a minor offense, or have been charged with a misdemeanor, and are otherwise eligible for diversion. Depending on their training, community support, and agreements with traditional court systems, most teen or youth courts are recognized as valid, legal venues for the process of hearing cases, sentencing and sentence fulfillment. Teen courts and their verdicts are not authorized by public law.

== Court structure ==
Teen courts are staffed by youth volunteers who serve in various capacities within the program, trained and acting in the roles of jurors, lawyers, bailiffs, and clerks. Teen courts usually function in cooperation with local juvenile courts and youth detention centers, middle and high schools, and/or community organizations such as the YMCA. Most teen courts are sentencing courts in which the offender has already admitted guilt or pleaded no contest.

Many teen courts operate much like a traditional court, holding hearings before a judge and jury with the jury deliberating to determine an appropriate disposition. Other courts employ different structures, such as a judge-panel model which includes a panel of 3 to 6 youth judges who collectively hear, deliberate, and sentence the offender.

Often, sentences will involve the defendant's making restitution to someone harmed or inconvenienced by their actions, or creating an informational awareness project about health, safety, respect, or another topic relevant to the offense. One of the more common sentences is community service. In many jury-based programs it is mandatory that the offender serve on a teen court jury. In some cases, educational workshops are required as part of the sentence, usually in cases involving alcohol or drug charges.

Youth volunteers may be eligible for school or community service credits through their schools, and community awards such as the President's Volunteer Service Award. Adult volunteers serve as trainers, advisors and coordinators of the teen courts; some courts have a small paid staff.

== Principles and results ==
Teen or youth courts provide an alternative court system through which juvenile offenders can be heard and judged by their peers. Most teen courts have strict guidelines for youth volunteers who participate in the sentencing process, which generally includes training, a modified bar exam, peer mentoring and compliance with a code of conduct. Many youth courts establish a youth bar association or ethics body which helps to set guidelines for ethical and fair procedure.

Because cases heard by teen courts are real cases, participants in teen court programs are required to return all case documentation, and to sign an oath of confidentiality regarding any information which comes to their knowledge in the course of the teen court case presentation.

State-approved teen courts implement restorative justice and attempt to reintegrate the youth offender to the community while sending appropriate messages to the offender regarding unacceptable behavior. The basic principles of restorative justice are community protection, competency development, and accountability. This system seeks to address the root causes of juvenile offenses and to reduce recidivism. The recidivism rates for standard programs in several states range from 6%-9%, which is less than half of the traditional recidivism rate for juvenile offenders, which hovers around 20%.

Some research has found that teen court programs can have different outcomes depending on gender, with female participants in some cases showing lower rates of re offending than males. Other studies suggest that while teen courts do not always perform better than traditional court processing overall, participants can still benefit from the experience.

Restorative justice principles require the offender to make amends to the victim and/or the community and provide opportunities for victims and community members to participate in the juvenile justice process, providing valued input in decision making. Because of the active role the victim plays, qualitative assessments can be made into victim impact and victim satisfaction.

== See also ==
- Arbitration
- Conflict resolution
- Dispute resolution
- Family therapy
- Mediation
- Office of Juvenile Justice and Delinquency Prevention
- Restorative justice
- Youth crime
- Youth justice in England and Wales
- Youth voice
