= Midtown Community Court =

New York City court for quality-of-life offenses

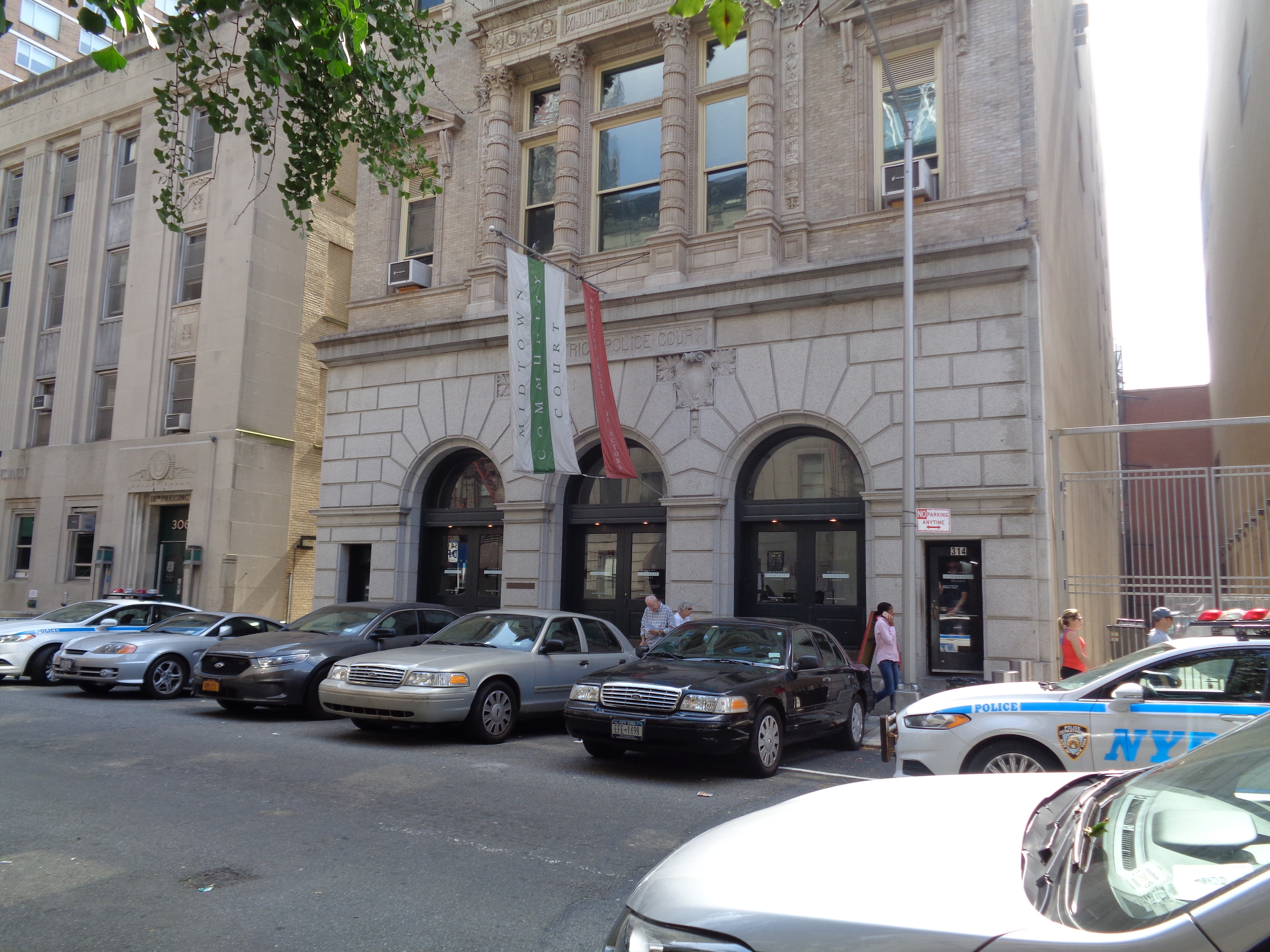
The Midtown Community Court

The Midtown Community Court is a part of the New York City Criminal Court that focuses on quality-of-life offenses, such as prostitution, shoplifting, farebeating and vandalism, with a view toward rehabilitation instead of punishment. For example, judges may order offenders to perform community service and refer them to such social services as drug treatment, mental health counseling, and job training.

It was established in 1993 in the Times Square neighborhood of Manhattan, New York City, and is now located on West 54th Street in Hell's Kitchen, Manhattan. (Note: The Midtown Community Court's address is 314 W. 54th St., New York, NY 10019) The Midtown Community Court was established as a collaboration between the New York State Unified Court System and the Center for Court Innovation. The court relies on partnerships with local residents, businesses and social service agencies to organize community restitution projects and provide on-site social services, including drug treatment, mental health counseling, and job training. Unlike most conventional courts, the Midtown Court combines punishment and help, requiring low-level offenders to pay back the neighborhood through community service while mandating them to receive social services to address problems that often underlie criminal behavior.

The court was the subject of an independent evaluation by the National Center for State Courts. According to the National Center, the court's compliance rate of 75 percent for community service was the highest in the city. Offenders performing community service contribute hundreds of thousands of dollars' worth of labor to the community each year. In conjunction with aggressive law enforcement and economic development efforts, the court has affected neighborhood crime: prostitution arrests dropped 56 percent and arrests for illegal vending were down 24 percent.

The court has been replicated both in the United States, in cities including Austin, Philadelphia and Portland, Oregon, and abroad, in South Africa, Great Britain, (Note: For more information about community courts in Great Britain, see the British government's official web site) Canada, (Note: For more information about the Vancouver Community Justice Centre, see here) and Australia. (Note: For more information about the Collingwood Community Justice Centre in Melbourne, Australia, see here)
