= Extraordinary court =

Court with irregular procedure or composition

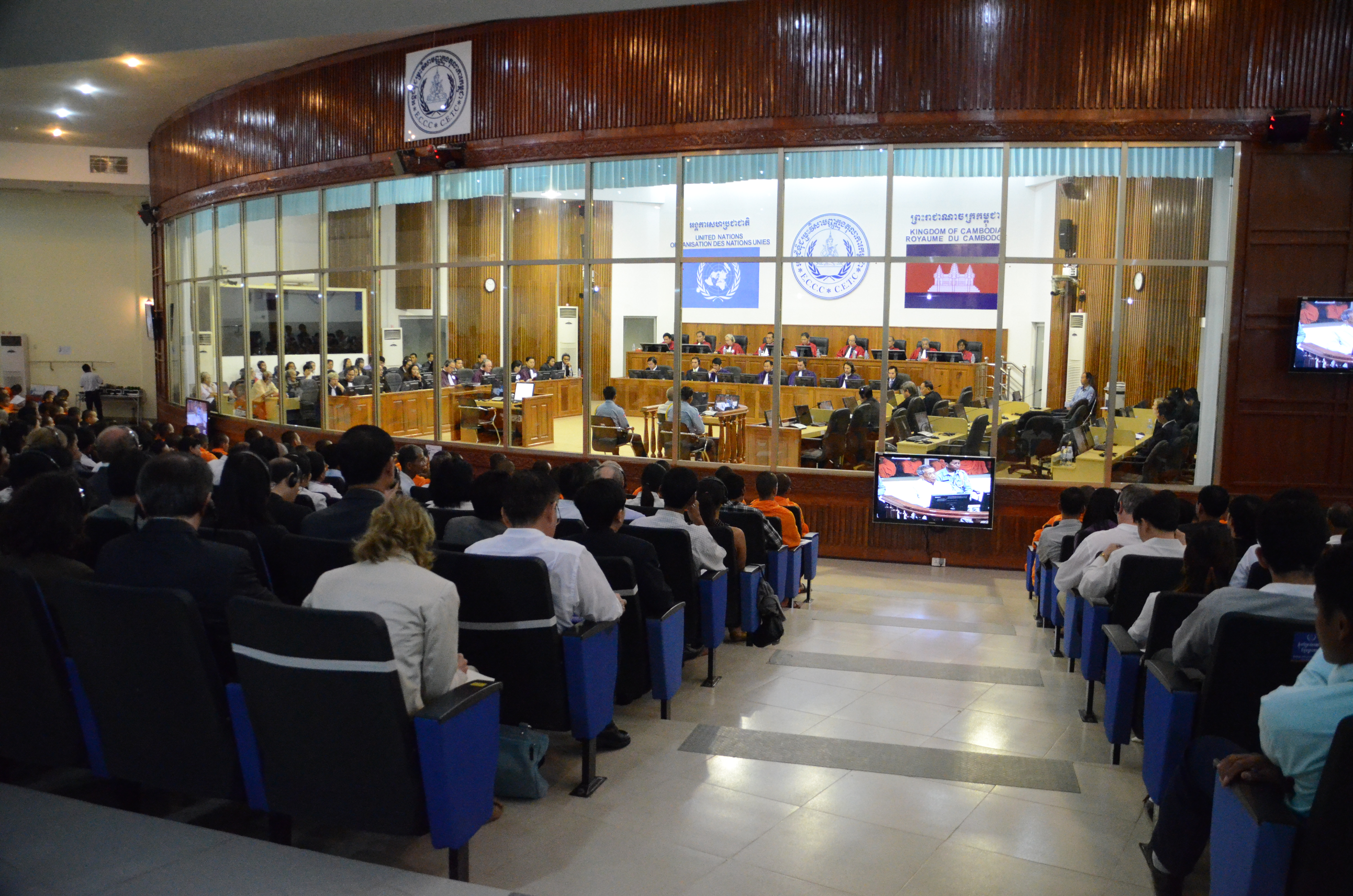
Khmer Rouge Tribunal in Cambodia is contemporary example of extraordinary court

An extraordinary court, or special court, is a type of court that is established outside of ordinary judiciary, composed of irregularly selected judges or applying irregular procedure for judgment. Since extraordinary courts can be abused to infringe fundamental rights of individuals, most modern countries ban such courts by constitution or statutes. Usually, modern military courts judged by courts-martial are regarded as examples of extraordinary courts.

== By country ==
=== Cambodia ===
An extraordinary court is the Extraordinary Chambers in the Courts of Cambodia, which is basically a chamber in the national court of Cambodia that is specially designed to judge crimes of the Khmer Rouge such as the Cambodian genocide, but its judges are not of the ordinary Cambodian judiciary but are selected among international candidates nominated by Secretary-General of the United Nations, according to an agreement between United Nations and the Cambodian government.

=== Germany ===
In modern Germany, the establishment of extraordinary courts (German: Ausnahmegerichte) is strictly prohibited by article 101(1) of the Constitution of Germany, in reflection of judicial murder by People's Court (German: Volksgerichtshof), which was a kind of Sondergericht that was established during Nazi Germany. The term Sondergericht itself means just the concept of 'special court', but the use of that term is discouraged, as it can refer to the legacy of the Nazis. As a result, contemporary courts in Germany with special jurisdiction (such as 'Federal Social Court' in cases of social security matters) are called a kind of 'specialized court' (German: Fachgerichte), composed of ordinary judges.

In that way, Article 101(1) of the Constitution is explained as forbidding establishment of both extraordinary courts and special courts, which are substantially the same concept. As the Constitution bans judgments by irregularly-composed judges, courts in the City of Kempten with special jurisdiction on military justice in Germany are also constituted by ordinary judges, according to Section 11a of German Criminal Code.

=== South Korea ===
In contemporary South Korea, the establishment of special courts (Korean: 특별법원, romanized: Teugbyeolbeob-won), meaning extraordinary courts (Korean: 예외법원, romanized: Ye-oebeob-won) is exceptionally allowed only for a military court, according to Article 110(1) of the Constitution of South Korea. It is notable that Justices at the Constitutional Court must have qualification as judges, which includes Justices in the Supreme Court of Korea, in ordinary courts, but Article 111(2) of the Constitution does not require military judges in the Military Court of Korea to have competence as ordinary court judges by 110(3) of the Constitution. The Constitutional Court of Korea explains that constitutional difference of qualification among ordinary court judges (including Supreme Court Justices), military judges and Constitutional Court Justices as constitutional grounds for non-qualified senior military officers to participate in military court judgments as adjudicators (Korean: 심판관, romanized: Simpangwan), together with qualified military judges (Korean: 군판사, romanized: Gunpansa) in exceptional cases, according to article 22(3) of the Military Court Act.

=== United States ===
The Foreign Intelligence Surveillance Court has the authority to issue warrants authorizing surveillance of suspected foreign spies or terrorists. FISA warrant requests are rarely denied. If an application is denied by one judge of the court, the federal government is not allowed to make the same application to a different judge of the court but may appeal to the United States Foreign Intelligence Surveillance Court of Review. Such appeals are rare: the first appeal from the FISC to the Court of Review was made in 2002 (In re Sealed Case No. 02-001), 24 years after the founding of the court.

The Alien Terrorist Removal Court similarly allows the government to present classified evidence in a sealed application to a judge for the purpose of designating a person as an "alien terrorist" and effecting their removal from the country. Created in 1996, the court lied dormant until it received its first case in 2026.

There are also military courts designed to judicially try members of enemy forces during wartime, operating outside the scope of conventional criminal and civil proceedings. The judges are military officers and fulfill the role of jurors. Military tribunals are distinct from courts-martial. These were most recently created under the George W. Bush administration and authorized by the Military Commissions Acts under the Bush and Obama administrations to assert jurisdiction over terror suspects designated as unlawful enemy combatants.

== See also ==
- Court
- Military court
- Ordinary court
- Specialized court
