= Livability court =

Special court focused on livability codes and standards

A Livability Court is a municipal court (or court of limited jurisdiction) focused on cases involving non-compliance with codes and standards about housing, waste, the environment, noise, animal control, zoning, traffic, and tourism.

The first Livability Court in the United States was created in Charleston, South Carolina, in 2002. Other cities in South Carolina have since adopted Livability Courts including North Charleston, Lancaster, Greer and Newberry.
