= Prisoner reentry =

Community integration of released prisoners

Prisoner reentry is the process by which prisoners who have been released return to the community. Many types of programs have been implemented with the goal of reducing recidivism and have been found to be effective for this purpose. Consideration for the conditions of the communities formerly incarcerated individuals are re-entering, which are often disadvantaged, is a fundamental part of successful re-entry.

A 2006 study done by the Manpower Demonstration Research Corporation statistically evaluated the effectiveness of prisoner reentry programs on the criteria scale of working, not working, promising, and unknown. Findings classify employment-oriented programs as working, drug rehabilitation programs as working, educational programs as promising, and halfway house programs as working.

A 2015 article from The New York Times Magazine commented, "It wasn't until the mid-2000s that this looming 'prisoner re-entry crisis' became a fixation of sociologists and policy makers, generating a torrent of research, government programs, task forces, nonprofit initiatives and conferences now known as the 're-entry movement'." At the end of 2001, there were approximately 5.6 million U.S. adults who had been in the incarceration system. By the end of 2004, more than 3% of U.S. adults were incarcerated or on probation or parole. With prisons becoming overcrowded, there is more political focus on depopulating prisons. In 2016, approximately 600,000 individuals were released from prison, and millions were in and out of county jail systems.

The abrupt re-entrance into society means formerly incarcerated individuals require support to reintegrate. The United States federal government allocates some funding for re-entry programs, but there is currently a lack of sufficient resources. Re-entry programs are now receiving more attention from public policy and criminal justice scholars.

== Resources for prisoner re-entry programs ==
In the past few decades, correctional institutions have seen a shift from prisoners serving indeterminate sentences, with release being assessed by parole boards, to offenders being released from prison after serving determinate sentences. However, those released are not receiving sufficient preparation for returning to their communities due to limited in-prison and post-release reentry programs; this inadequate structure for re-entry directly influences the possibility of recidivism, also referred to as the "revolving door". United States spending for corrections is approximately $80 billion a year, with re-entry receiving the least amount of fiscal attention relative to other parts of the criminal justice system process. From 2001 to 2004, the United States' federal government allocated over $100 million for reentry programs. Without increased resources for this target area proportional to that spent on control-oriented aspects of incarceration, the issue that remains is the expansion of access and participation for inmates. While the area of reentry program development is still growing, assessments demonstrate their efficacy for transitioning ex-offenders back into society and reducing recidivism. The potential for well-resourced reentry program has yet to be realized, but public policy and criminal justice scholars believe this to be a deserving area for funding to be re-allocated and prioritized.

Somewhat counterintuitively, people released from prison following exoneration from their conviction may receive less reentry assistance than former prisoners who merely completed the prison sentence for their crime. Some programs and services provided through parole or other correctional systems are unavailable to exonerees, as they are no longer considered offenders under correctional supervision.

== Types of re-entry programs ==
There are different types of re-entry programs that aim to help formerly incarcerated individuals transition back into society. These programs come in different forms to meet specific needs and challenges faced by returning citizens. Education and vocational training programs are important in equipping individuals with the necessary skills for reintegration. GED programs and college classes provide academic support, allowing participants to earn diplomas or pursue higher education. Similarly, vocational training programs offer practical skills in trades like carpentry, welding, and automotive repair, improving job opportunities after release. Re-entry programs also focus on securing stable housing, healthcare services, and some programs serve sub-sectors of the formerly incarcerated population such as women or juveniles. By addressing these challenges, re-entry programs aim to empower individuals and reduce recidivism rates, promoting successful community reintegration. Halfway houses are a tool for reentry into society. Halfway houses are typically mandated upon early release. They can also be sentenced to complete the remainder of their time there. The goals of halfway houses are to provide a substance-free, healthy, safe, and family-like environment to support recovery.

=== Education and Training ===
Recently, there has been a growing recognition of the importance of education and vocational training for prisoners reintegrating into society. These programs, along with efforts to address employment, housing, and healthcare, are crucial in equipping incarcerated individuals with the skills and qualifications needed for successful community reintegration. Many correctional institutions now offer educational opportunities like GED programs and college classes, providing inmates with academic skills and qualifications necessary for further education or employment after release. Vocational training programs within prisons also offer practical skills and certifications; these programs not only provide inmates with valuable hands-on experience and industry-specific knowledge but also help reduce the likelihood of reoffending by fostering a sense of purpose and self-worth. Empowering incarcerated individuals with education and vocational skills not only improves their chances of a successful transition back into society but can also contribute to long-term public safety.

=== GED Programs and College Classes ===
Prison education programs are gaining traction in research on reducing recidivism rates. On average, around $12 million is allocated to correctional education programs across all states. These programs have the potential to increase an inmate's structured time during incarceration and help them find employment or pursue higher education after release. These benefits should ultimately lead to a decrease in subsequent offending. Most prisons offer GED classes, vocational training, apprenticeships, and even college classes that can help inmates earn degrees after release. Studies have shown that these education programs have positive outcomes for inmates and cost taxpayers very little. In fact, investing $1,149 in education can save taxpayers over $5,800 in crime-prevention resources.

Studies indicate that participating in such programs reduces the likelihood of reoffending. Some states, like Ohio, mandate these programs to address inmates' educational needs and facilitate successful reentry at a low cost. Recent research has focused on the effectiveness of these programs, showing lower recidivism rates for participants. However, while postsecondary programs consistently show benefits, the effectiveness of GED programs varies.

Efforts to evaluate these programs are increasing, but further research on outcomes is necessary. Ohio's prison education programs, part of the reentry-focused initiative, offer incentives for participation and completion, potentially reducing sentence lengths.

In the state of California, the three public higher education systems -- California Community Colleges, California State University, and University of California-- offer prisoner re-entry services. The California Community College system houses the Rising Scholars Network which provides assistance to current and formerly incarcerated juveniles and adults. The California State University houses the Project Rebound Consortium, which provides admissions and academic support, and wrap-around re-entry support services. The University of California includes the Underground Scholars Initiative, a student-led re-entry program that assists current and formerly incarcerated individuals, as well as system-impacted student whose family members have been incarcerated.

Rising Scholars Network

The Rising Scholars Network (RS) launched in 2015 due to Senate Bill No. 1391 (SB 1391). SB 1391 changed the open-course provisions, which allowed incarcerated inmates to enroll in community college courses while incarcerated. In 2021, RS became an official program within the California Community College System through Assembly Bill 417. RS provides administrative student support that includes priority registration, basic needs support, financial aid assistance, academic counseling, tutoring, mentorship, and various wrap-around resources. As of the 2025 biennial report, RS operates in 102 colleges, 60 juvenile facilities, 31 state prisons, 9 federal prisons, and 44 county jails. Additionally, RS has assisted 4,265 incarcerated and formerly incarcerated individuals to obtain either a degree or a certificate.

Project Rebound

Project Rebound's history started in 1967, when a formerly incarcerated professor Dr. John Irwin founded it at San Francisco State University. In 2016, Project Rebound expanded its consortium to include eight additional campuses. By fall 2026, Project Rebound had reached twenty campuses in the California State University system. Project Rebound offers eligible students who are currently or formerly incarcerated, with admission and academic support, financial aid assistance, mentorship, and wrap-around re-entry support. According to the Project Rebound Annual Report 2023, 749 degrees have been documented since 2016. Furthermore, the Project Rebound Annual Report 2024-25 indicates the recidivism rate is less than 1%, compared to the California state average of 39%.

Underground Scholars

Underground Scholars is the University of California's academic support program for current and formerly incarcerated individuals who are seeking re-entry services. Underground Scholars started at the University of California, Berkeley in 2013 and expanded to all University of California campuses. Underground Scholars conducts community outreach statewide to local prisons to provide its services, ensuring that candidates are properly transferred to their local UC campus. On campus, Underground Scholars staff are tasked with helping its students with enrollment, financial aid, mentorship, and wrap-around re-entry services.

Unlike Rising Scholars Network and Project Rebound, Underground Scholars has no statewide concise annual report. Each Underground Scholars chapter does provide its own reporting of the academic year's outcome and accolades, but scattered information limits how much can be verified from all Underground Scholars Programs.

=== Vocational Training ===
The National Institute of Justice Crime Solutions website contains information from a study on Corrections-Based Vocational Training Programs. Vocational training programs in correctional facilities aim to help incarcerated individuals with job skills, reducing their chances of reoffending and improving their chances of employment after release. These programs cover various industries like carpentry, electrical work, cooking, and auto repair. By teaching valuable skills, vocational training not only prepares individuals for work but also keeps them busy with productive activities, which can help reduce behavioral issues in prison. However, despite the potential benefits, participation rates in these programs may be dropping due to reasons like lack of awareness, interest, or funding.

Several studies have shown that vocational training is effective in lowering recidivism rates and increasing employment opportunities. One study discovered that inmates who participated in vocational training were much less likely to reoffend compared to those who didn't, with a significant 12.6 percent decrease in recidivism rates among participants. Similarly, Davis and his team reported that vocational education programs significantly increased the chances of finding a job after release, with participants being twice as likely to secure employment compared to non-participants.

Different institutions may have different requirements for vocational training programs. These requirements can include factors like age, current offense, time until release, and educational background. Some facilities may even require individuals to have a high school diploma or GED before they can participate in vocational training. Overall, vocational training programs are important because they provide incarcerated individuals with the opportunity to gain employment skills and reintegrate into society successfully. This ultimately helps to reduce the likelihood of reoffending and improves public safety.

=== Integration into Existing Reentry Programs ===
Integrating prison education programs in reentry initiatives is essential for meeting the educational needs of incarcerated individuals and lowering recidivism rates. These programs, like those in Ohio, offer incentives for participation and completion, potentially shortening sentences. By addressing criminogenic needs and offering structured education and training, these programs help inmates prepare for successful reentry into society. Research shows that education and employment play key roles in reducing reoffending. The positive outcomes linked to program participation highlight their significance in aiding the transition from incarceration to community life. Therefore, integrating prison education programs into reentry initiatives is a promising approach to breaking the cycle of recidivism and supporting successful rehabilitation and reintegration.

== Reentry Resources after Incarceration ==
=== Employment ===
With approximately 2 million people incarcerated, the prison population constitutes a large portion of the U.S. labor force. An essential argument for putting prisoners to work is that in-prison productivity translates to preparation for entering the workforce post-release. Prison labor is cost-effective for taxpayers, allows prisoners to contribute to their families from inside through the generation of income, and can be a form of restorative justice for victims. Poor resources and a prison infrastructure unfit for large-scale labor serve as barriers to establishing effective employment re-entry programs in-prison and post-release, which would include making livable wages, vocational training, education, and skill development accessible to the U.S. prison population. Current funding levels only have the capacity to provide a small percentage of prisoners the opportunity to engage in "commercially rewarding work."

In a study, employers noted what they were looking for when hiring previously incarcerated individuals. They expressed that they are looking for dedicated and honest employees. They also strive for social rehabilitation; they want and encourage employees to be involved with others. There are two main things employers desire when hiring previously incarcerated individuals: to give back to the community and an explicit belief in forgiveness and the importance of giving offenders a second chance. They also emphasized the importance of keeping their staff safe.

The "Returning Home Study" conducted by the Urban Institute from 2001 to 2006 found that ex-prisoners who worked before imprisonment, and those who find employment soon after release, are less likely to be re-incarcerated within a year of release. The same study found that releasing prisoners to parole supervision both reduces the likelihood that they will engage in substance use and makes it easier for them to find employment after release.

==== Programs assisting ex-offenders to find employment ====
- The Safer Foundation - a Chicago-based non-profit, founded in 1972, that provides employment, education, and re-entry services for people with arrest and conviction records.
- Project RIO (Re-Integration of Offenders)
- The Corrections Clearinghouse
- The Center for Employment Opportunities - a transitional jobs program originally based in New York City, providing formerly incarcerated individuals with immediate, paid work along with job coaching and placement services. It has since expanded to additional U.S. cities with support from philanthropic funders, including Blue Meridian Partners' Justice and Mobility Fund.
- www.ex-offendersresourcenetwork.org

=== Housing ===
Finding housing after being incarcerated can be very difficult. Research shows that the earlier in life that one is incarcerated, the more likely you are to be homeless.

In a study from New Zealand, the ability to secure stable housing was found to reduce the likelihood of recidivism by 20 percent. Housing providers struggle to make housing available to ex-offenders because of safety concerns and a failure to accommodate the specific needs of formerly incarcerated individuals without guaranteed income or access to social welfare support. In New York City, "more than 54 percent of people released from prison moved straight into the city's shelter system in 2017."

Across the country, initiatives are being made to assist ex-offenders in finding housing.

- In Alameda County, California, homeowners are partnering with formerly incarcerated individuals and allowing them to rent. At Impact Justice, ex-offenders are paired with homeowners for housing and guidance for reintegration. As of 2025, the program has placed more than 260 participants.
- In Delaware, a commission was created to increase access and support for Delaware state inmates to secure housing and employment.
- In Washington state, the Tacoma Housing Authority is offering housing assistance for ex-offenders and at-risk college students.
- In Seattle and Washington D.C., landlords are no longer allowed to screen for felony convictions on rental applications.

=== Healthcare ===
Other reentry programs focus on improving health among ex-prisoners, which tends to be significantly worse than that of people who have never been imprisoned. While incarcerated, prisoners face higher rates of chronic and infectious diseases, mental illness, and substance use disorders. After release, the difficulties faced during reentry exacerbate these health conditions, as demonstrated by a link between incarceration history and poorer physical and mental health. Formerly incarcerated individuals face a lack of access to primary care services, mental health conditions, low health literacy, and difficulty obtaining medication access after release. Along with these reintegration barriers, formerly incarcerated individuals also face toxic social stress since they have to adjust to a new life, and the transitional period is very unstable. The challenges of reconnecting with their communities lead to a lack of social support, which is usually crucial to preventing negative health outcomes. These factors create a specific need for healthcare services during the period of reentry. A 2007 study found that, during the first two weeks after release, the risk of death for formerly incarcerated individuals was 12.7 times that of general community members.

Healthcare-focused reentry programs are designed to aid in the transition back to society, improve health outcomes for the formerly incarcerated population, and reduce recidivism.

Healthcare reentry programs can focus on factors such as discharge planning, substance use disorder treatment, or mental health. A 2020 study evaluated three types of healthcare reentry programs: a swift, certain, fair (SCF) program for drug-involved probationers; an aftercare program for drug-involved offenders; and a comprehensive reentry program. In the SCF approach, patients were given graduated punishments that target abstinence through frequent drug tests and monitoring, and this model was found to be less effective in reducing recidivism. The second program was a residential program of recovery homes for individuals dealing with substance use disorder. Residents live together and provide a supportive, sober social network. This program increased employment and reduced substance use, but it did not affect incarceration levels. The third program provided holistic health services through institutional caseworkers and supervision agents in the community. It provided planning, support, and direction for individuals to address their needs. This type of program was found to be most effective in reducing recidivism.

Additionally, healthcare reentry programs vary in their timing. Some begin only after release, while others begin while the individual is still incarcerated. A 2013 study evaluating best practices in healthcare-focused reentry programs found that programs that began discharge planning prior to release and were based in the individual's community were more successful in improving health outcomes. Discharge planning aids in continuity of care since individuals are transitioning from the prison healthcare system to their community healthcare system. Success of this practice was seen in the Connecticut Building Bridges Community Reentry Initiative (CRI) in 2004. The program included personal meetings with case managers months before release to discuss the individual's goals for their health and to assess any potential risk factors for health issues after reentry. By addressing holistic health needs one month before release, the program had over 60% of its participants meet goals related to health supports and their recidivism rate was only 16%.

Since healthcare during incarceration is managed by the government, there is debate surrounding responsibility for healthcare during the reentry period. In 1976, the U.S. Supreme Court ruling in Estelle v. Gamble stated that the government has an obligation and responsibility to provide adequate medical care to the incarcerated population, but there was no mention made of responsibility for healthcare on discharge or after release. One perspective is that the government does have an obligation to ensure continuity of care after release. Another perspective is that reentry should be based in the community and supported by private providers. Private providers have greater independence to make quick decisions since they can avoid bureaucracy. Private providers are also “not constrained by civil service rules and salary scales”. One compromise position in this debate is to use government funding and grants to establish connections to private/community-based programs upon release.

Some healthcare reentry programs are independent organizations, while others are directly integrated into healthcare systems. One example of a healthcare-focused reentry program is the Transitions Clinic Network. Funding for this program is from a variety of sources, including different government funds and grants. This organization aims to build a healthcare model for individuals returning to the community from incarceration. They work with primary care clinics across the country to adopt a model of healthcare that improves health and reentry outcomes. They employ community health workers with a history of incarceration to work with patients, which helps ensure that the lived experiences of the incarcerated community are incorporated in the development of the program.

Some existing healthcare organizations and hospitals offer healthcare reentry services:

- Health Right 360
- RISE Reentry Program

== Re-entry for women prisoners ==
Women prisoners and formerly incarcerated women are advocating for the need for gender-specific re-entry programs in prison and post-release, specifically focused on healthcare, substance abuse, mental illness, and family reunification.

For women prisoners concerned about family reunification post-release, comes with challenges of securing housing and employment, necessary for meeting child welfare requirements. In cases where these requirements cannot be met, women ex-offenders claim to benefit from rehabilitative counseling to deal with the strain incarceration has on the relationship between mothers and children.

As women re-enter society after incarceration, they may face challenges and setbacks that may hinder a successful reentry outcome. Women reentering society may receive less familial support, such as housing or financial support, which in turn requires the women to get charitable or governmental assistance in order to avoid homelessness. Women released from prison also have difficulty securing employment, transportation, childcare, and parenting. Many female prisoners claim that they often need support and assistance to navigate their transition. Women reentering society after being incarcerated are at an increased risk for “substance use, physical health, and mental health disorders.” Also, many female prisoners are victims, as they may suffer from abuse and neglect, which results in them suffering from low self-esteem. Researchers found that 90% of women who have been involved in the criminal justice system, have experienced varying forms of childhood trauma. As of 2011, 94% of the female prison population have a history of sexual or physical abuse. As victims of abuse, women are more likely to be depressed and blame themselves for the abuse.

To help navigate these potential challenges, facilities such as the Women’s Initiative Supporting Health Transitions Clinic (WISH-TC) can provide re-entry women-facilitated access to treatments. The WISH-TC employs formerly incarcerated community healthcare workers who motivate their peers, which helps to improve access to healthcare and reduce the stigma around asking for help. The WISH-TC facility is trauma-specific, which provides patients with access to medical treatments, mental health treatment, recovery, and an empowerment model. When women enter the facility, they will receive a substance abuse disorder screening, a brief intervention, and a referral for specific treatment. Facilities such as this clinic work to empower women and educate them on their individual health needs and literacy. Support from the clinic staff is “key in women’s satisfaction with their care.”

Reentry services for women aimed to help with substance abuse disorders and trauma treatments and recoveries significantly improving their employment status and housing stability. This is known as a client-centered approach, where post-release outcomes of lowering psychiatric and trauma-related symptoms, decreasing substance use, and enhancing recovery psychosocial functioning are effectively improved among female offenders. Another program called "Seeking Safety" for Incarcerated Women is a cognitive-behavioral intervention for incarcerated women who suffer from posttraumatic stress disorder, in which results from the program show a significant reduction in PTSD and depression scores among patients. A study found that 44.5% of women reentering society have reportedly had reduced psychiatric symptoms and noteworthy improvements in their trauma symptoms after receiving treatment from a client-centered treatment approach. These programs working to help women reentering society have been found to help them “feel supported, motivated, and competent to address their substance use, physical, and mental health conditions.”

Women reentering society may have to pay off financial obligations they accrued when they were charged. These legal financial obligations are criminal justice system fees, fines, penalties, and restitution orders. Research found that the average incarcerated female will have about $1,000 more in legal financial obligations compared to their male counterparts. This burden of legal financial obligations places debts on female offenders reentering society after being incarcerated.

== Juvenile Re-entry ==
Juveniles in the justice system often require different treatment and consideration than their adult counterparts. While there is constantly ongoing debate about the ways in which juvenile punishment should be given (whether it should be the same level of severity or differ in approach), often in the form of policy and moral debate, one of the most common methods of responding to juvenile offense is placing juveniles in re-entry programs.

Juvenile Reentry is a culmination of services, often delivered through programs, that help to reintegrate displaced juveniles back into the community. These programs are often designed to discourage juvenile delinquency and prevent such crimes from happening again.

Juvenile Re-entry programs involve many stages, with each stage playing its own role in helping the juvenile reform. There is the entry phase, placement phase, transitional phase, and community-based aftercare phase. Each stage involves varying degrees of supervision over the juvenile, while the delinquent is given safer surroundings and taught valuable lessons and ways of life that ultimately will help them become a more valuable and safe addition to the community.

== See also ==
- Collateral consequences of criminal conviction
- United States incarceration rate
- Incarceration in the United States
- Incarceration prevention in the United States
- Incarceration of women in the United States
- Penal labor in the United States
- Prison healthcare
