= Military Commissions Act =

There are multiple uses of Military Commissions Act:

- Military Commissions Act of 2006, passed October 17, 2006
- Military Commissions Act of 2009, passed October 9, 2009
