= Drug court =

Type of court

Drug courts are problem-solving courts that take a public health approach to criminal offending using a specialized model in which the judiciary, prosecution, defense bar, probation, law enforcement, mental health, social service, and treatment communities work together to help addicted offenders into long-term recovery. Instead of punishment, their purpose is to address one of the underlying drivers of crime and, in the process, reduce the use of imprisonment, potentially leading to substantial cost-savings. Drug courts aim to do this by incentivizing or mandating offenders into addiction treatment combined with frequent drug testing and regular monitoring by the judge.

== Origins ==
Drug treatment courts originated in Miami in 1989 as a response to rising drug-related offences, particularly linked to the widespread use of crack cocaine and resulting prison overcrowding in the United States. Designed as an alternative to traditional custodial sentences, these courts divert eligible non-violent offenders into judicially supervised community-based treatment programs instead of incarceration. The approach is based on the premise that addressing substance use issues through structured treatment and court oversight can help offenders overcome addiction and, in turn, reduce rates of recidivism. Since their inception, drug treatment courts have expanded and become a widely used alternative to imprisonment for substance-abusing offenders. By December 2009, there were more than 1,700 TDCs in the United States, Canada, the United Kingdom, and Australia.

== Key components ==
In 1997, the National Association of Drug Court Professionals in the United States published Defining Drug Courts: The Key Components. They named these as key components:

- Drug courts integrate alcohol and other drug treatment services with justice system case processing
- Using a non-adversarial approach, prosecution and defense counsel promote public safety. Participants must waive their due process rights to a speedy trial and sign a pre-emptive confession before being allowed to participate.
- Eligible participants are identified early and promptly placed in the drug court program
- Drug courts provide access to a continuum of alcohol, drug, and other related treatment and rehabilitation services
- Abstinence is monitored by frequent drug testing (including alcohol)
- A coordinated strategy governs drug court responses to participants' compliance
- Ongoing judicial interaction with each drug court participant is essential
- Monitoring and evaluation measure the achievement of program goals and gauge effectiveness
- Continuing interdisciplinary education promotes effective drug court planning, implementation, and operations
- Forging partnerships among drug courts, public agencies, and community-based organizations generates local support and enhances their effectiveness

== Effectiveness ==
How effective drug courts are largely depends on how well they adhere to the ten key components described above. The United States has more drug courts than any other country in the world, so most studies of their effectiveness are based on results in the USA. Out of thousands of drug courts operating in the US, 40% of states which have them do not have a management information system, required by the key components, which would enable their performance to be monitored properly.

=== Length of follow-up period ===
Another factor which affects how successful a drug court appears to be is the length of the follow-up period after participants have finished treatment. The longer the follow-up (sometimes as much as four years), the more likely participants are to relapse and reoffend. Results almost always look better if the follow-up period is only 12 months, while participants are often still engaged in the treatment program ordered by the court.

As a result of these methodological issues, meta-studies which have been conducted over the years describe quite variable results. Few studies have found drug courts which reduce reoffending by more than 20%. Studies which have found more positive results may not have taken confounding issues into account which undermine the reliability of their conclusions. For instance, the Government Accountability Office (GAO) study from 2005, which assessed 27 different drug courts, found that 24 of them reduced recidivism by between 1% and 13%. But one court in this study reported a reduction of 35%, which appeared to make it one of the best performing drug courts in the United States. However, this result was based on a follow-up period of only 12 months.

Another study which suggested a better result than 20% was the GAO analysis from 2011. This described reductions in recidivism from 32 different US drug courts, one of which achieved a reduction in the re-arrest rate of 26%. This was the Kings County Drug Treatment Alternative to Prison Program (DTAP) in New York which is “recognized as one of the nation’s most successful diversion programmes”. However, the reason this result appears better than all the others is because it refers solely to reduced offending by graduates – those who completed the programme. The other drug courts in this analysis appear less successful because their results include defendants who dropped out of treatment and reoffended.

A meta-study in the Journal of Criminal Justice looked at 154 independent drug court evaluations. It claimed that participation in one of these courts led to "a drop in recidivism" between 38% and 50%. However, these studies used a variety of different measures for recidivism (such as re-arrest, reconviction, or re-imprisonment) which tends to confound the results. And the claimed reductions in recidivism were all based on a 12-month follow-up period which mostly overlapped with the period that participants were still in treatment in the court. Recidivism rates generally increase significantly after completing treatment when the level of supervision falls away.

=== Compliance with key components ===
Evaluations of individual drug courts where compliance with the ten key components is monitored, tend to show better results. One such study of a mature drug court which has been operating for over ten years found that over the entire period, the re-arrest rate declined by nearly 30%. This was the Multnomah County Drug Court in Portland, Oregon, which is the second oldest drug court in the country. One finding was that the longer drug court judges worked with addicts, and the more experience they had in the court (key component #7), the better the success rates were for participants. The authors of the study concluded that "this model provides clear support that drug court does reduce criminal recidivism".

=== Retention rate ===
Another important factor in determining a drug court's effectiveness is the retention and graduation rate. For instance, the King's County DTAP programme attributes its 35% reduction in re-arrests to its excellent retention rate of 71% in the first 12 months of the programme. But over the following four years, its graduation rate falls to 41%.

A review conducted in 2001 for the National Drug Court Institute Program found that graduation rates nationally were around 47% (in the first 12 months). The authors noted that "the research on long-term outcomes was less definitive".

== Comparison with other interventions ==
Another way of measuring the effectiveness of drug courts is to compare them with 'business as usual' or a variety of counterfactuals. One counterfactual is that drug addicted offenders would likely be sent to prison if a drug court was not available. Recidivism rates vary from one country to another depending on a variety of factors. In the U.S. nearly 44% of prisoners return to prison within 12 months of release. The rate varies from state to state. In any given state, the re-incarceration rate would need to compared with the re-incarceration rate of drug court participants in that state - which is different from the re-arrest rate usually reported in drug court evaluations.

The availability of rehabilitation programs also varies from state to state. So another counterfactual is to compare reoffending rates of drug court participants in a given state with prisoners who attended addiction treatment while in prison in that state.

== By country ==
=== Australia ===
In Australia, drug courts operate in various jurisdictions, although their formation, process and procedures differ. The main aim of the Australian courts is to divert illicit drug users from incarceration into treatment programs for their addiction. Drug courts have been established in New South Wales, Queensland, South Australia, Victoria, and Western Australia. People appearing in Australian drug courts often fall outside the parameters for other pre-court services

=== Canada ===
The first drug treatment court was opened in Toronto in 1998 with federal funding from Justice Canada's Drug Treatment Court Funding Program. The program expanded to Vancouver, British Columbia in 2001, Edmonton, Alberta in December 2005, Winnipeg, Manitoba in January 2006, Ottawa, Ontario in March 2006, Regina, Saskatchewan in October 2006, Calgary in 2007, Hamilton and Durham.

=== New Zealand ===
A five-year pilot Alcohol and Other Drug Treatment Court was opened in Auckland, New Zealand, in 2012, the first of its type for the country. Since the pilot was established, 46% of participants have graduated. According to the New Zealand Drug Foundation, this rate is six times higher than that achieved by most ‘voluntary’ rehabilitation programmes. Graduates were 62% less likely to reoffend and 71% less likely to return to prison in the first 12 months after treatment. When non-graduates were included in the analysis, 54% (of participants overall) were less likely to reoffend and 58% less likely to go back to prison in the following 12 months.

=== United Kingdom ===
In the UK, drug courts are currently being tested in various places. In December 2005, the United Kingdom began a pilot scheme of dedicated drug courts. Family Drug and Alcohol Court are in operation in various locations throughout the country, including London, Gloucestershire and Milton Keynes where the service is run by the Tavistock and Portman NHS Foundation Trust. In February 2015 it was announced that more would open in East Sussex, Kent and Medway, Plymouth, Torbay and Exeter, and West Yorkshire.

=== United States ===
The first drug court in the US took shape in Miami-Dade County, Florida in 1989 as a response to the growing crack cocaine problem plaguing the city. Chief Judge Gerald Wetherington, Judge Herbert Klein, then State Attorney Janet Reno, and Public Defender Bennett Brummer designed the court for nonviolent offenders to receive treatment. In the United States, according to the National Association of Drug Court Professionals, as of December 31, 2014, there are 3,057 drug courts representing all 50 states, the District of Columbia, Guam, Puerto Rico, Northern Mariana Islands, and various tribal regions.

=== Women and drug courts in United States ===
There are many variations to drug courts and more recently some have opened up to deal specifically with women drug users. Some even treat women who engage in prostitution because of their drug addiction.

A research study has shown how addiction can be the results of mental illness derived from interpersonal violence. This shows that crime that results from drug addiction can be tied to trauma that is a result of interpersonal violence. This indicates a societal problem that must be dealt with treatment instead of incarceration.

=== Juvenile drug courts in the United States ===
Drug courts also exist to treat juveniles with substance abuse issues. They work similarly to adult drug courts but are tailored to meet the needs of children. One research study on juvenile drug courts stated that many previous research studies have inconsistent results due to different methodological problems making the results hard to generalize to the population. This research study done over ten randomized different jurisdictions shows promising results. The results show that juvenile drug courts reduced marijuana use rates, increased accessibility to resources, and overall reduced rearrest rates also known as recidivism. However, the positive effects observed were small to moderate. The effects in this study were discovered to be more beneficial for high-risk youth.

== Drug courts in the news ==
Drug courts have had many successful graduates. They have bi-partisan support in the political arena.

== See also ==
- DWI court
- Veterans treatment court
