= DWI court =

Courts for defendants who plead guilty to driving while intoxicated

DWI courts (sometimes called DUI courts) are a form of court that exists in some United States legal jurisdictions, that use substance-abuse interventions and treatment with defendants who plead guilty of driving while intoxicated or impaired. DUI courts may focus on repeat offenders and drivers with very high levels of blood alcohol at the time of the offense. As of May 2020, there were approximately 269 designated DUI courts in the United States, and approximately 186 hybrid DUI/drug courts that also accept both drug and DUI offenders.

== Terminology ==
The term DWI stands for driving while intoxicated, while the term DUI stands for driving under the influence. Both charges relate to operating a motor vehicle while impaired as the result of the consumption of alcohol or another intoxicant. The name given to a DWI court may vary depending upon the terminology used in the state for its impaired driving offenses.

== Goals ==
DWI courts tend to focus on the most serious cases and repeat offenders, and thus apply strict standards to the cases and defendants that come before them. Drunk and impaired driving offenses involves a substantial risk of harm and death to the driver and to others, as a foreseeable consequence of such conduct. In 1996, DWI cases accounted for 32 percent of motor vehicle traffic fatalities in the United States In 2014, alcohol was involved in 9,967 motor vehicle accident deaths, accounting for 31 percent of all traffic fatalities.

It is estimated that 6.2 percent of adults aged eighteen and older have an alcohol use disorder, characterized by an impaired ability to stop or control alcohol use. DWI courts focus on defendants who are deemed at high risk of re-offending if given a less intensive disposition. DWI courts seek to reduce impaired driving by treating alcoholism, while requiring offenders to take responsibility for their actions.

Studies suggest that DWI courts reduce both DWI recidivism and general criminal recidivism by an average of more than twelve percent, with the most successful DWI courts reducing recidivism by as much as fifty to sixty percent as compared to other forms of sentencing.

== Participation ==
Defendants who want DWI court treatment are required to abstain from drinking alcohol. Participants may also be subject to various requirements such as:

- Random visits from probation or law enforcement officers
- Attending treatment
- Participation in recovery support meetings, such as Alcoholics Anonymous
- Community service
- Frequent urine analysis or blood alcohol tests
- Transdermal alcohol detection devices such as SCRAM bracelets
- Installation of an ignition interlock devices.

== Related issues ==
When defining DWI offenses, states and courts must consider whether or not the charge or a specific drunk driving offense should be classified as a crime of violence. If a court rules the incident as a crime of violence, which would result in the charge being treated as an "aggravated" felony for purposes if immigration law.

DWI Checkpoints may be used in conjunction with DWI courts to identify and prosecute impaired drivers.

In many jurisdictions, the court in which a DWI case is heard depends on the law enforcement agency that cited the individual and the location of the alleged violation. Cases often begin in a lower court, such as a justice or municipal court. Cases that involves more serious charges or appeals may be moved to a higher trial court.

== See also ==
- Alcoholism
- Victimology
