= Domestic violence court =

Type of court

Specialized domestic violence courts are designed to improve victim safety and enhance defendant accountability. There is no one set definition of a specialized violence court, although these types of courts can be either civil or criminal and typically hear the majority of an area's domestic violence cases on a separate calendar. Additionally, these courts are typically led by specially assigned judges who can make more informed and consistent decisions based on their expertise and experience with the unique legal and personal issues in domestic violence cases.

Specialized domestic violence courts emerged as a problem-solving court in the 1980s and 1990s as a result of challenges and reforms to the criminal-legal system's approach to domestic violence such as Thurman v. City of Torrington. This reform led to changes in police and prosecutor's handling of domestic violence cases, and specialized domestic violence courts were created to address the larger number of domestic violence cases as the criminal-legal system began to take domestic violence more seriously.

While there are a variety of benefits associated with specialized domestic violence courts, there are concerns that specialized domestic violence courts do not support survivors or address the broader societal causes of domestic violence.

== Background on domestic violence ==
The purple ribbon is used to encourage awareness of the problem of domestic violence

The FBI estimates that a domestic violence crime is committed at a rate of once every fifteen seconds. According to conservative estimates, one million women are battered by an intimate partner annually. These numbers and the efforts of domestic violence advocates have led, over the last 20 years, to changes in the criminal justice response to such offenses. Prior to the 1960s and 1970s, domestic violence was viewed in the United States as a personal issue to be dealt with in private, rather than through the courts. However, activists in the battered women's movement and anti-rape movement raised awareness of domestic violence as an issue, not just within relationships, but within society more broadly. Activists in these movements initially relied on grassroots work to support survivors and promote change, but some activists turned to more institutionalized methods of change such as legislation and mainstream social services. Some of the greatest institutional changes as a result of this activism occurred in the 1990s, with the passage of the federal Violence Against Women Act in 1994 and the creation of the first specialized domestic violence court in Philadelphia, Pennsylvania in 1991. However, some criticize this institutional strategy for relying on the criminal-legal system, which is not meant to promote survivor autonomy.

This increased attention to domestic violence resulted in, among other things, the passage of mandatory arrest laws, an increase in funding for services for victims, and the creation of special domestic violence prosecution and police units. At the same time, there was a parallel movement taking place within state court systems as judges and attorneys began to search for new tools, strategies, and new technologies that could help them address difficult cases where social, human, and legal problems collide.

New York's chief judge, Judith S. Kaye, with co-author Judge Susan Knipps, articulated the thinking behind the development of domestic violence courts in an essay published in Western State University Law Review:

One possible judicial response to the current situation is to continue to process domestic violence cases as any other kind of case, and to continue to observe systemic failures. Another response, however—the problem solving response—is to try to design court programs that explicitly take into account the special characteristics that domestic violence cases present. If domestic violence defendants present a particular risk of future violence, then why not enhance monitoring efforts to deter such actions? If victims remain in abusive situations due to fear for their own and their children’s well being, then why not provide links to services and safety planning that may expand the choices available to them? If cases are slipping between the cracks of a fragmented criminal justice system, then why not work together to improve coordination and consistency?

Today, there are nearly 300 courts nationwide that have special processing mechanisms for domestic violence cases. Three sites were the subject of a study by the Vera Institute of Justice: Milwaukee County, Wisconsin; Washtenaw County, Michigan; and Dorchester District in Boston, Massachusetts. Starting in 1999, judges and attorneys, advocates for women and batterer intervention specialists, probation officers, police, and others in those jurisdictions banded together in an ambitious effort to improve criminal justice and community responses to domestic violence. The three sites were selected to participate in the Judicial Oversight Demonstration Initiative—a national demonstration project funded by the U.S. Department of Justice's Office on Violence Against Women—have spent the past five years working to enhance victim safety and the oversight of offenders in their communities.

The Center for Court Innovation is funded by the Office on Violence Against Women to provide technical assistance to courts interested in developing or enhancing their domestic violence programs. The Center for Court Innovation also has a grant from the National Institute of Justice to document the number and types of domestic violence courts in the United States.

== Benefits ==
Justice system practitioners, victim advocates, and researchers have cited the following major benefits of domestic violence courts:

- Enhanced coordination of cases and consistent orders in different cases involving the same parties.
- More comprehensive relief for victims at an earlier stage of the judicial process.
- Advocacy services that encourage victims to establish abuse-free lives.
- Greater understanding by judges of how domestic violence affects victims and their children.
- More consistent procedures, treatment of litigants, rulings, and orders.
- Greater availability of mechanisms to hold batterers accountable for the abuse, such as required Batterer Intervention Programs (BIPs), which are programs that are intended to rehabilitate batterers and prevent further abuse.
- Improved batterer compliance with orders.
- Greater confidence on the part of the community that the justice system is responding effectively to domestic violence.
- Greater system accountability.
- Greater use of Trauma- and violence-informed care in court and advocacy practices. These practices, such as survivor-centered advocacy, culturally specific programs, narrow the gap between service delivery and the needs of survivors.

== Concerns ==
Susan Keilitz notes a number of concerns about domestic violence courts. The need for judges to specialize, for instance, may lead to a loss of neutrality among judges or “the assignment of judges who are not motivated to acquire the knowledge and skills required to be effective in these cases, or to loss of judicial effectiveness from the stress of fast-paced decisionmaking in difficult and emotionally charged cases every day.” Another concern is that greater efficiency in prosecution may lead to “assembly-line justice that ignores the special needs of victims,” Keilitz wrote.

Additionally, there are concerns that specialized domestic violence courts exclude and further harm multiply marginalized survivors. When examined through the lens of structural intersectionality, scholars such as Alesha Durfee argue that despite seeming neutral, the policies and procedures in specialized domestic violence courts are actually designed for “White, middle-class, cis, heterosexual, passive wom[en] who [are] not system-involved and [have] experienced documented physical abuse.” There are concerns that specialized domestic violence courts, like other large institutions, replicate inequalities through mismatches between the assumptions embedded in law and policy about survivors and the lived experiences and oppressions faced by multiple marginalized survivors.

There are also concerns that specialized domestic violence courts exclude and further harm multiply marginalized survivors through carceral feminism. Scholars such as Deer and Barefoot argue that because of the history of state violence at the hands of the police and criminal justice system against marginalized communities, reliance on the criminal justice system through specialized domestic violence courts perpetuates broader inequalities. From Deer and Barefoot's perspective, “an increase in arrest rates and law enforcement involvement has not led to a decrease in sexual assault and instead leads to more violence,” especially against poor women of color and sexual minorities.

== In New York ==
In New York, the typical domestic violence court features a single presiding judge, a fixed prosecutorial team, and enhanced staffing to monitor defendant compliance and provide assistance to victims. In order to ensure compliance with court orders, New York's first domestic violence court, the Brooklyn Felony Domestic Violence Court, launched in 1996, instituted a procedure that required parolees to come back to the court for a formal review of the terms of their order of protection. There are now over 35 domestic violence courts in New York, including courts in the Bronx, Queens and Westchester Counties, the city of Buffalo, and smaller cities like Clarkstown and Binghamton. An impact evaluation of 24 New York domestic violence courts found reduced re-arrests among convicted offenders. New York State has also created integrated domestic violence courts where a single judge handles criminal domestic violence cases and related family issues, such as custody, visitation, civil protection orders and matrimonial actions. In addition, the New York court system has three Youthful Offender Domestic Violence Courts that work with teenage defendants.

== Sources ==
- Berman, Greg; John Feinblatt (2005). Good Courts: The Case for Problem-Solving Justice. New York, New York: The New Press. p. 237. ISBN 1-56584-973-6.
