= Veterans' court =

Specialized US local court

A veterans' court is a "special court" which is charged with trying cases of minor offenses which involve veterans, particularly those diagnosed with service-related illnesses. The first veterans' court was established in 2008 in Buffalo, New York, and has been used as a model for establishments of other veterans' courts in other parts of the United States. There are questions, however, about the judicial system allowing a "special class." Although the court only deals with misdemeanors, the prosecutors and judges can choose to allow defendants to agree to plead guilty to a misdemeanor, thus reducing the charges.

The system was created to address those veterans who are consistently facing various charges associated with addiction, homelessness, etc. This special allowance, however, often enables vets who aren't on that group to take advantage of avoiding prison. Also, violent felonies are specifically precluded from consideration.

== San Diego ==
In January 2011, a Veterans' Court pilot program was established in San Diego. Both veterans and active duty service members have been accepted as participants. To be accepted into the program the individual must meet certain criteria:

- The applicant must be a veteran of the United States military.
- The charges that are brought against the applicant must have some relation to their military service.
- The applicant must be accepted into the program by the Veterans' Court Judge. Recommendations by the Veterans' Court team helps, but is not necessarily required.

There are certain charges that will preclude an applicant from being accepted in the program. Those are the more violent charges that include murder, manslaughter, homicide, rape or gang-affiliated crimes.

Participation

Once an applicant is accepted they are considered a participant. Participation in the program consists of intensive supervision from probation, the VA and the court. Each participant must meet several goals in order to move to the next phase of the program, 4 in total. There is no set timeframe in which the program must be completed. While in the program each veteran must attend weekly therapy and, more often than not, counseling for Post Traumatic Stress. Bi-monthly urinalysis must be conducted at random either in a treatment facility or at the VA hospital.

Goal

The goal of veterans' court is to allow the veteran to be rehabilitated to the law-abiding citizen they were before their experience in the military and combat. There are no guaranteed incentives for any participant who satisfactorily completes the program. Typical incentives do include taking years off of probation and moving from formal to summarized probation. At the completion, fees can be waived, and felonies can be commuted, and under a new addition to California Penal Code 1170.9, judges may expunge charges completely.

The Team

The court process is aided by Veterans Justice Outreach representatives from the Veterans Administration. Representatives of the District Attorney's office, the Public Defender's office, treatment facilities and probation are also in attendance at every hearing. Each participant is also given a mentor to work one on one with throughout the process.
