= List of Australian federal courts and tribunals =

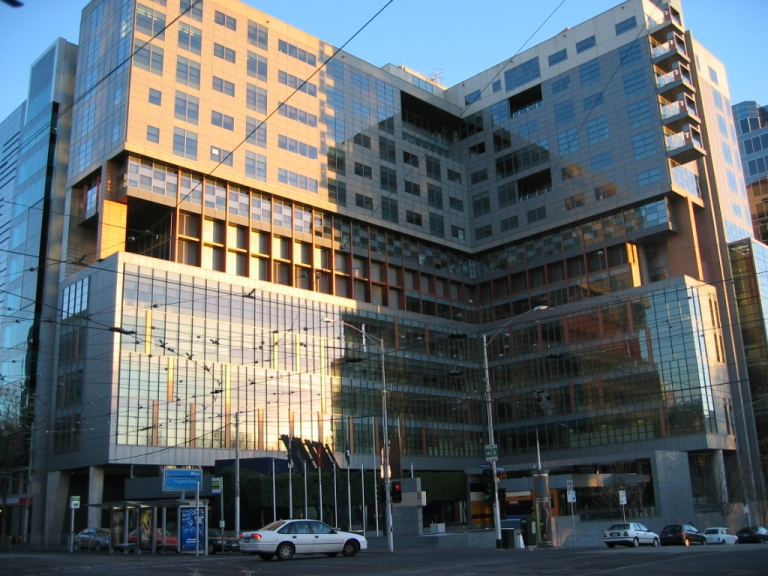
The Federal Courts Building in Melbourne

The following is a list of courts and tribunals of the Commonwealth of Australia:

== List of boards, commissions, courts, and tribunals ==
=== Sitting boards, commissions, courts, and tribunals ===
==== Sitting boards ====
- Auditing and Assurance Standards Board
- Australian Accounting Standards Board
- Australian Classification Board
- Australian Motor Vehicle Certification Board
- Companies Auditors Disciplinary Board
- CSS Board
- Foreign Investment Review Board
- Life Insurance Actuarial Standards Board
- Military Superannuation and Benefits Board of Trustees No. 1
- Pooled Development Funds Registration Board
- Professional Standards Board for Patent and Trade Marks Attorneys
- PSS Board
- Veterans' Review Board

==== Sitting councils ====
- Administrative Review Council
- Advisory Council on Intellectual Property
- Anindilyakwa Land Council
- ANZLIC—The Spatial Information Council
- Australia Council
- Australian Defence Force Academy Consultative Council
- Australian Heritage Council
- Australian Learning and Teaching Council
- Australian Loan Council
- Australian Maritime Defence Council
- Australian National Council on Drugs
- Australian Political Exchange Council
- Australian Procurement and Construction Ministerial Council
- Australian Research Council
- Australian Statistics Advisory Council
- Australian Transport Council
- Business-Industry-Higher Education Collaboration Council
- Central Land Council
- Commonwealth Consumer Affairs Advisory Council
- Community Services Ministers' Advisory Council
- Criminology Research Council
- Defence Exporters Council
- Defence Reserves Support Council
- Environment Protection and Heritage Council
- Family Law Council
- Financial Reporting Council
- Financial Sector Advisory Council
- Great Barrier Reef Ministerial Council
- International Legal Services Advisory Council
- Local Government and Planning Ministers' Council
- Ministerial Council for Aboriginal and Torres Strait Islander Affairs
- Ministerial Council for Corporations
- Ministerial Council on Consumer Affairs
- Ministerial Council on Gambling
- Ministerial Council on Mineral and Petroleum Resources
- Ministerial Council on the Administration of Justice
- Murray-Darling Basin Ministerial Council
- National Alternative Dispute Resolution Advisory Council
- National Australia Day Council
- National Competition Council
- National Environment Protection Council
- National Environmental Education Council
- National Health and Medical Research Council
- National Indigenous Council
- National Rural Advisory Council
- National Workplace Relations Consultative Council
- Natural Resource Management Ministerial Council
- New South Wales World Heritage Properties Ministerial Council
- Northern Land Council
- Primary Industries Ministerial Council
- Quarantine and Exports Advisory Council
- Specialist Medical Review Council
- Tasmanian Wilderness World Heritage Area Ministerial Council
- Tiwi Land Council
- Tourism Ministers' Council
- Trade Policy Advisory Council
- Wet Tropics Ministerial Council
- Workplace Relations Ministers Council

==== Sitting commissions ====
- Australian Competition & Consumer Commission
- Australian Crime Commission
- Australian Electoral Commission
- Australian Energy Market Commission
- Australian Human Rights Commission
- Australian Law Reform Commission
- Australian Public Service Commission
- Australian Securities & Investments Commission
- Australian Sports Commission
- Australian Trade Commission (Austrade)
- Commonwealth Grants Commission
- International Air Services Commission
- National Anti-Corruption Commission
- Military Rehabilitation & Compensation Commission
- National Mental Health Commission
- National Transport Commission
- Productivity Commission
- Safety, Rehabilitation and Compensation Commission

==== Sitting courts ====
- Federal Court of Australia
- Federal Circuit and Family Court
- High Court of Australia

==== Sitting tribunals ====
- Australian Competition Tribunal
- Administrative Review Tribunal
- Copyright Tribunal
- Defence Force Discipline Appeal Tribunal
- Defence Force Remuneration Tribunal
- Fair Work Commission
- Federal Police Disciplinary Tribunal
- National Native Title Tribunal
- National Sports Tribunal
- Remuneration Tribunal Secretariat
- Superannuation Complaints Tribunal

=== Abolished boards, courts and tribunals ===
==== Abolished boards ====
- Army Inventions Board
- Australian Shipping Board
- Australian Wool Board
- Commonwealth Marine Salvage Board

===== Abolished councils =====
- Australian Landcare Council
- Australian Pharmaceutical Advisory Council
- Australian Science, Technology and Engineering Council (1977–1997)
- National Alternative Dispute Resolution Advisory Council (1995–2013)
- National Indigenous Council (2004–2008)

==== Abolished commissions ====
- Australian Fair Pay Commission
- Aboriginal and Torres Strait Islander Commission
- Export Wheat Commission
- Inter-State Commission (1912–1920, 1975–1989)
- National Water Commission (2004–2014)
- Murray-Darling Basin Commission

==== Abolished courts ====
- Australian Industrial Court (1973–1977) (Note: New name of the Commonwealth Industrial Court from 1973 and jurisdiction given to the Federal Court of Australia in 1977.)
- Australian Military Court (2007–2009) (Note: Found to be unconstitutional in Lane v Morrison [2009] HCA 29 and replaced by the Military Court of Australia.)
- Commonwealth Court of Conciliation and Arbitration (1904–1956) (Note: Functions divided between the Commonwealth Industrial Court and the Commonwealth Conciliation and Arbitration Commission as a result of the Boilermaker's case [1956] HCA 10, (1956) 94 CLR 254.)
- Commonwealth Industrial Court (1956–1973) (Note: Given the judicial functions of the Commonwealth Court of Conciliation and Arbitration as a result of the Boilermaker's case [1956] HCA 10, (1956) 94 CLR 254. Renamed the Australian Industrial Court in 1973.)
- Family Court (1976–2021)
- Federal Circuit Court / Federal Magistrates Court (1999–2021)
- Federal Court of Bankruptcy (1930–1977) (Note: Jurisdiction given to the Federal Court of Australia in 1977.)
- Industrial Relations Court of Australia (1994–1996) (Note: Separate court established in 1994 with Judges of the Federal Court of Australia and jurisdiction returned to the Federal Court of Australia in 1996; last judge retired in 2018)

==== Abolished tribunals ====
- Administrative Appeals Tribunal (1976–2024)
- Australian Coal Industry Tribunal (1940–1995)
- Australian Conciliation and Arbitration Commission (1973–1988) (Note: New name of the Commonwealth Conciliation and Arbitration Commission from 1973 and renamed the Australian Industrial Relations Commission in 1988.)
- Australian Industrial Relations Commission (1988–2009) (Note: New name of the Australian Conciliation and Arbitration Commission from 1988 and replaced by Fair Work Australia in 2010.)
- Commonwealth Conciliation and Arbitration Commission (1956–1973) (Note: Created as a result of the separation of judicial and arbitral functions as a result of the Boilermaker's case [1956] HCA 10, (1956) 94 CLR 254. Renamed Australian Conciliation and Arbitration Commission in 1973)
- Fair Work Australia (2010–2012) (Note: Replaced the Australian Industrial Relations Commission from 2010 and was renamed the Fair Work Commission in 2013.)
- Migration Review Tribunal
- Refugee Review Tribunal
- Social Security Appeals Tribunal

== See also ==
- Australian court hierarchy
- Government of Australia
- List of Australian government entities
