= Ombudsmen in Australia =

Ombudsmen in Australia are independent agencies who assist when a dispute arises between individuals and industry bodies or government agencies. Government ombudsman services are free to the public, like many other ombudsman and dispute resolution services, and are a means of resolving disputes outside of the court systems. Australia has an ombudsman assigned for each state; as well as an ombudsman for the Commonwealth of Australia. As laws differ between states just one process, or policy, cannot be used across the Commonwealth. All government bodies are within the jurisdiction of the ombudsman.

The Commonwealth Ombudsman is also the Defence Force Ombudsman, Immigration Ombudsman, Postal Industry Ombudsman, Law Enforcement Ombudsman, VET Student Loans Ombudsman, Overseas Students Ombudsman and the Private Health Insurance Ombudsman. Many industries, such as aged care, banking, energy and water, telecommunications, etc., also have ombudsmen or similar bodies that assist with dispute resolution.

== Commonwealth Ombudsman ==
The Commonwealth Ombudsman in Australia was established in 1977. The Ombudsman can investigate complaints from people who believe they have been treated unfairly or unreasonably by an Australian Government department / agency or prescribed private sector organisation, including Australia Post, Centrelink, Child Support and the Department of Immigration and Border Protection.

The Commonwealth Ombudsman is also the Defence Force Ombudsman, Immigration Ombudsman, Postal Industry Ombudsman, Law Enforcement Ombudsman, VET Student Loans Ombudsman, Overseas Students Ombudsman, the Private Health Insurance Ombudsman and the National Student Ombudsman. Through an arrangement with the Government of the Australian Capital Territory (ACT), the Commonwealth Ombudsman is also the ACT Ombudsman. The Office of the Commonwealth Ombudsman (the Office) also delivers an International Program, funded by the Department of Foreign Affairs and Trade, to improve the governance and accountability in the Asia-Pacific region, and supports and monitors the administration by other agencies of the Public Interest Disclosure (PID) scheme established under the Public Interest Disclosure Act 2013. In addition, the Ombudsman has a number of statutory oversight functions in relation to law enforcement agencies' use of special powers, including those under the Telecommunications (Interception and Access) Act 1979, Surveillance Devices Act 2004 and Part 1AB of the Crimes Act 1914. The current Commonwealth Ombudsman is Iain Anderson.

== State ombudsman ==
The various states in Australia have (variously described) state Ombudsman offices, with similar jurisdiction as described above, except over state government authorities. There is much collaboration in an academic sense between Ombudsman in Australia, given the highly similar nature of their roles (despite differing jurisdictions). The offices frequently work on joint projects, such as those managing unreasonable conduct of complainants.

=== New South Wales Ombudsman ===
The first NSW Ombudsman was appointed in 1975 and the legislation became operative in May that year. Since then, there have been many changes – public authorities have merged and separated and there have been seven different Ombudsman. The current NSW Ombudsman, Paul Miller PSM, was appointed in May 2021.

=== Ombudsman for the Northern Territory ===
The Ombudsman for the Northern Territory is independent of Government and provides a free service to the public. The acting Ombudsman is Brenda Monaghan.

=== Ombudsman of South Australia ===
The SA Ombudsman is a completely independent official who has comprehensive power to investigate government departments and authorities and local government councils. The office provides 'free, impartial, informal and timely resolution of complaints to promote fairness, openness and good public administration in South Australia'. The current Ombudsman is Emily Strickland.

=== Ombudsman of Victoria ===
The Victorian Ombudsman investigates complaints from the public about

- Local Councils – for poor services, communication, complaint handling, unreasonable actions or decisions e.g. refusal of requests for compensation
- Victorian Government Departments – e.g. Department of Families, Fairness and Housing, Department of Education, Department of Justice and Community Safety
- Victorian Government Organisations e.g. WorkSafe Victoria, VicRoads, Fines Victoria
- Victorian universities and TAFEs,
- Public funded community services,
- Prisons and
- Certain professional boards e.g. Architects Registration Board of Victoria, Victorian Legal Services Board

It provides services that are 'free, fair and independent'. Marlo Baragwanath has been the Victorian Ombudsman since March 2024.

=== Ombudsman Western Australia ===
The Ombudsman of Western Australia investigates complaints about Western Australian State Government agencies, statutory authorities, local governments and public universities. The current Ombudsman for Western Australia, Bevan Warner, was appointed in June 2025.

=== Queensland Ombudsman ===
The Queensland Ombudsman's Office is an independent complaints investigation agency. Its role is to make sure that public agencies (State government departments and bodies, and local councils) act fairly and make the right decisions for Queenslanders. The current Queensland Ombudsman is Anthony Reilly, who was appointed to the role in July 2020.

=== Tasmanian Ombudsman ===
The Tasmanian Ombudsman investigates complaints regarding public authority administrative action and contravention of state privacy legislation, conducts Freedom of Information reviews in respect of government agencies and can accept public interest disclosures (i.e. whistleblowing complaints) and other miscellaneous functions (e.g. auditing of police telephone interception warrants). The current Ombudsman, Richard Connock, was appointed in July 2014.

== Industry and organisational ombudsman ==
Unlike the government run ombudsman services, industry-based ombudsman resolve complaints made against their members, who are required to pay a yearly membership fee. Industry-based ombudsman generally operate according to a constitution and are claimed to be impartial in their decision-making. That is, they are said to not take sides—they are often required to act neither as an industry nor a consumer advocate.

Like government run ombudsman services, the services of external/alternative dispute resolution (ADR) are sometimes free for consumers. The costs of the ombudsman services are usually charged to its members on a case-by-case basis, or can be determined on the number of complaints that the company has received for that financial year. Generally the providers in a particular industry (for example telecommunications, energy and water, credit, insurance, public transport) are required to be members of an independent External Dispute Resolution scheme (EDR). A Board or Council with representatives of both industry and consumers as well as an independent Chair, is responsible for the operation of an industry-based Ombudsman. The Board or Council appoints the Ombudsman. Government or an independent regulator, such as the Australian Securities and Investments Commission (ASIC) may be involved by approving the scheme and ensuring that it complies with certain standards. Sometimes a Government Ombudsman is also an industry Ombudsman. An industry-based Ombudsman typically charges each member according to the number and/or the complexity of complaints it receives about the company. While the development of these facilities over the last 20 years has "lifted industry dispute resolution standards", the industry schemes have "stalled and cannot be described as world best practice".

=== Energy and water ===
Each Australian state has established Energy and Water Ombudsman schemes, which work to resolve disputes between the consumers of electricity, gas and water services and the providers of those services.

- Energy and Water Ombudsman (New South Wales) (EWON)
- Energy and Water Ombudsman (Victoria) (EWOV)
- Energy and Water Ombudsman (SA) (EWOSA)
- Energy Ombudsman of Tasmania
- Energy and Water Ombudsman Queensland (EWOQ): a free, fair and independent dispute resolution scheme for residential and small business consumers in Queensland who have a complaint about their electricity, gas or water provider. Established in 2007 as the Energy Ombudsman Queensland, the scheme was expanded to include water complaints for South East Queensland consumers in 2011. Jane Pires was appointed Queensland's Energy and Water Ombudsman in 2016.
- Energy and Water Ombudsman Western Australia (EWOWA)
- ACT Civil and Administrative Tribunal

=== Financial industry ===
==== Australian Financial Complaints Authority ====
The Australian Financial Complaints Authority (AFCA) is the external dispute resolution (EDR) scheme for all complaints regarding the financial services industry, approved by the Australian Securities and Investments Commission (ASIC).

AFCA helps individuals and small businesses to resolve complaints about financial products and services and assists with complaints including credit, finance & loans, insurance, banking deposits & payments, investments & financial advice and superannuation.

David Locke was appointed Chief Ombudsman of AFCA in November 2018 when AFCA commenced operation and replaced the Financial Ombudsman Service (FOS), the Credit and Investments Ombudsman (CIO) and the Superannuation Complaints Tribunal (SCT).

==== Taxation and superannuation ====
The Inspector-General of Taxation and the Taxation Ombudsman, known as the Tax Ombudsman, is an independent, Commonwealth statutory agency that provides oversight and assurance to improve the fairness and integrity of taxation and superannuation administration in Australia.

The Inspector-General of Taxation Act 2003 established the Office of the Inspector-General to review and make recommendations on systemic issues to improve tax and superannuation administration, and to provide independent advice on these areas to the Government and Parliament. In 2015, the Inspector-General was also appointed Taxation Ombudsman to investigate and help resolve complaints from taxpayers or tax practitioners on the administration of the Australian Taxation Office or Taxation Practitioners Board, in a timely and efficient way.

The Tax Ombudsman also works to raise awareness of the performance and integrity of the tax and superannuation systems and promote the integrity of these systems in Australia.

=== Other industries ===
- Private Health Insurance Ombudsman
- Produce and Grocery Industry Ombudsman
- Public Transport Ombudsman: The PTO is a not for profit, independent dispute resolution body, providing a free, fair, informal and accessible service for the resolution of complaints about public transport in Victoria.
- Tolling Customer Ombudsman
- Telecommunications Industry Ombudsman (TIO): a free and independent alternative dispute resolution scheme for small business and residential consumers in Australia who have a complaint about their telephone or internet service. Established in 1993 by the Australian Federal Government, the TIO is independent of industry, the government and consumer organisations. The TIO is authorised to investigate complaints about the provision or supply of telephone or internet services.
- Oxfam Australia operated a transnational Mining Ombudsman service (2000–2009) dealing with complaints against Australian mining companies.

== Other complaint-handling and review agencies ==
In some cases, it may be more appropriate for complaints to be investigated by the Information Commissioner (formerly the Privacy Commissioner) who investigates complaints about breaches of privacy; the Australian Human Rights Commission (previously the Human Rights and Equal Opportunity Commission) which investigates complaints about discrimination because of race, sex or disability; or one of the other avenues of Australian Government administrative review. Review Tribunals can review the merits of an agency's decision, and they also have the power to change a decision.

- Administrative Review Tribunal (ART)
- Migration Review Tribunal (MRT)
- National Alternative Dispute Resolution Advisory Council (NADRAC)
- Office of the Commissioner for Complaints (for complaints about Commonwealth funded aged care services)
- Privacy Commissioner
- Refugee Review Tribunal (RRT)
- Social Security Appeals Tribunal (SSAT)
- Veterans' Review Board

There are also several children's commissioner agencies at state and territory level.

=== Intelligence and security related complaints ===
Complaints about the actions/decisions of the organisations comprising the Australian intelligence community (listed below), may be lodged with the Inspector-General of Intelligence and Security, currently The Hon Christopher Jessup KC.

- Australian Secret Intelligence Service (ASIS)
- Australian Security Intelligence Organisation (ASIO)
- Australian Signals Directorate (ASD)
- Defence Intelligence Organisation (DIO)
- Office of National Assessments (ONA)

=== Employment ===
- Australian Small Business and Family Enterprise Ombudsman: Kate Carnell AO is the inaugural Ombudsman and an independent advocate for small business owners.
- Fair Work Ombudsman
- Office of the Employee Ombudsman, South Australia

== Associations ==
- Australian and New Zealand Ombudsman Association (ANZOA)

== See also ==
- Whistleblower protection in Australia
