= Karen Synon =

Australian public servant and politician

Senator for Victoria
- In office 13 May 1997 – 30 June 1999
- Preceded by: Jim Short

Personal details
- Born: 15 September 1959 (age 67) Moe, Victoria, Australia
- Party: Liberal Party of Australia
- Spouse: Giuseppe De Simone
- Education: University of Melbourne

Karen Margaret Synon (born 15 September 1959) is an Australian public servant and former politician. She served as a Senator for Victoria from 1997 to 1999, representing the Liberal Party. She was appointed to the Administrative Appeals Tribunal in 2015.

== Early life ==
Synon was born in Moe, Victoria. She attended Blackburn South High School and Whitehorse Technical School, later completing an MBA at the University of Melbourne.

In 1986, Synon established the Westgate Community Initiatives Group, a non-profit employment services provider based in Melbourne's western suburbs. She served as general manager until 1993, when she took up a position with the Victorian government as director of employment in the Department of State Development.

== Politics ==
Synon joined the Young Liberal Movement at the age of 16. She was active in the Liberal Party of Australia (Victorian Division) for two decades prior to her appointment to the Senate, including as president of the Williamstown branch. She was an ally of Liberal powerbroker Michael Kroger, whom she first met in the Young Liberals during the 1970s.

=== Senate ===
Synon was appointed to the Senate on 13 May 1997 to fill the casual vacancy caused by the resignation of Jim Short, whose original six-year term was due to conclude on 30 June 1999. In the Senate she advocated for industrial relations reform, welfare reform, and voluntary student unionism. In her maiden speech she spoke against the "entitlement mentality" and "culture of dependency" that she believed had developed in Australia. She also "often raised human rights concerns in the Senate" and was a parliamentary observer at the 1999 Indonesian legislative election.

Prior to the 1998 federal election, Synon was placed in the "unwinnable" fourth position on the Coalition Senate ticket in Victoria. Her failure to be placed higher was due to her alignment with Michael Kroger and Peter Costello during a time of factional conflict with Jeff Kennett's supporters. She was defeated for the third position on the ticket by Tsebin Tchen, a Kennett ally, who defeated Synon by eight votes after Kennett intervened personally on his behalf.

== Later career ==
Synon was appointed to the Refugee Review Tribunal in 2001 and the Migration Review Tribunal in 2004, in both cases as a part-time member. In 2015, she was appointed to a five-year term on the Administrative Appeals Tribunal (AAT). In 2019, she was also announced as an independent director of the Australian Housing and Urban Research Institute.

In 2020, Synon was appointed as a deputy president of the AAT and division head with responsibility for the social services and child support division.
