= Deirdre O'Connor =

Australian judge

The Honourable Justice Deirdre O'Connor

Judge of the Federal Court of Australia
- In office 1 July 1990 – 5 March 2002

President Administrative Appeals Tribunal
- In office 1990–1994
- Preceded by: Daryl Davies
- Succeeded by: Jane Mathews
- In office 1999–2002
- Succeeded by: Garry Downes

President Australian Industrial Relations Commission
- In office 1994–1997
- Preceded by: Barry Maddern
- Succeeded by: Geoffrey Giudice

Personal details
- Born: Deirdre Frances O'Connor; 5 February 1941 Sydney, New South Wales, Australia
- Died: January 28, 2024 (aged 82) Kiama, New South Wales, Australia
- Spouse(s): Gregory Sachs; Michael Joseph
- Children: 5 (David, Antony, Peter, Lionel, Sean)
- Education: Bethlehem College, Ashfield; University of Sydney
- Occupation: Judge, academic, lawyer

Deirdre Frances O'Connor (5 February 1941 – 28 January 2024) was an Australian lawyer, academic, Judge of the Federal Court, President of the Administrative Appeals Tribunal, and President of the Australian Industrial Relations Commission.

== Early life and education ==
O'Connor went to school at Bethlehem College, Ashfield. She received a Bachelor of Arts from University of Sydney 1961. She was a schoolteacher from 1961 to 1969 and studied law at the University of Sydney, graduating with first class honours in 1974.

== Career ==
O'Connor combined her education in teaching and law to be a lecturer in law at the University of NSW, Australian Film and Television School and Macquarie University between 1974 and 1980. In 1978 O'Connor was appointed by the Australian government as its representative at the UNESCO conference on the teaching of human rights. She became a barrister in 1980 and in 1983 was appointed a member of the NSW Law Reform Commission. She was also appointed Chairman of the Australian Broadcasting Tribunal in 1986.

She was inducted onto the Victorian Honour Roll of Women in 2001.

In 2008, O'Connor conducted an inquiry into the appointment, management and termination of Dr. Graeme Stephen Reeves.

=== Federal Court of Australia ===
O'Connor was the first woman appointed to the Federal Court, and for much of her time on the bench O'Connor was president of either the Administrative Appeals Tribunal or the Australian Industrial Relations Commission. O'Connor resigned from the Federal Court, despite being some 10 years short of the mandatory retirement age.

=== Administrative Appeals Tribunal ===
O'Connor was president of the Administrative Appeals Tribunal from 1990 until 1994 and then again from 1999 until 2002.

=== Australian Industrial Relations Commission ===
O'Connor was appointed President of the Australian Industrial Relations Commission in 1994, a position she held until 1997. During her presidency the Commission decided the Family Leave test case, which gave effect to the International Labour Organization convention on Workers with Family Responsibilities recommendation and established a right to family leave, including a right to take sick leave to care for a member of the employees family, with a cap of 5 days carers leave per year. O'Connor also led the full bench which decided the Public Holidays test case which determined that, while public holidays were determined by state governments, employees under federal award should receive at least 10 public holidays per year. The commission also gave effect to the Superannuation guarantee scheme in the Superannuation test case by providing an award right to the payment of superannuation. In the Supported Wage System case the commission established a model award clause intended to assist people with disabilities to obtain employment. The commission also determined the proper approach to the legislative protection on the right to strike in the ABC case.

== See also ==
- List of the first women holders of political offices in Oceania

Legal offices
Preceded by Daryl Davies	President Administrative Appeals Tribunal; 1990–1994	Succeeded by Jane Mathews
Preceded by Barry Maddern	President Australian Industrial Relations Commission; 1994–1997	Succeeded by Geoffrey Giudice
Preceded by Jane Mathews	President Administrative Appeals Tribunal; 1999–2002	Succeeded by Garry Downes
