= Australian administrative law =

Law covering Australian government agencies

Australian administrative law is that body of law that defines the extent of the powers and responsibilities of administrative agencies of Australian governments and defines the challenge to the exercise of such powers. The Australian administrative law originated and developed in English and Australian common law, which has undergone significant statutory codification and a shift in focus toward judicial review within tribunals with extensive jurisdiction.

Australia possesses well-developed ombudsman systems and Freedom of Information legislation, both influenced by comparable overseas developments. Its notice and comment requirements for the making of delegated legislation have parallels to the United States. Australia's borrowings from overseas are still largely shaped by its evolution within a system of parliamentary democracy that loosely follows a Westminster system of responsibility and accountability.

== History ==
The constitutional framework and development of administrative law in Australia was highly influenced by legal developments in the United Kingdom and United States. At the end of the 19th century, the British constitutional theorist A. V. Dicey argued that there should be no separate system of administrative law such as the droit administratif which existed in France. As a result, Australian administrative law before World War II developed in an unplanned way.

The present administrative law is largely a result of growing concern about control of bureaucratic decisions in the 1960s. In response a set of committees was established in the early 1970s, whose recommendations constituted the basis for what became known as the "New Administrative Law". The most important of these, the Kerr Report, recommended the establishment of a general administrative tribunal which could review administrative decisions on the merits, codification and procedural reform of the system of judicial review, and the creation of an office of Ombudsman. These proposals were put into practice with the passing of a package of federal statutes: the Administrative Appeals Tribunal Act 1975, the Ombudsman Act 1976, the Administrative Decisions (Judicial Review) Act 1977, and the Freedom of Information Act 1982. Some of those have since been replicated in States and Territories.

== Judicial review ==
The grounds for challenging administrative action were developed at common law and, in relation to the federal government, have been codified in the Administrative Decisions (Judicial Review) Act 1977. The kinds of error which would give rise to judicial review appeared to have been identified with reference to a list of categories such as relying on irrelevant considerations, improper purpose, Wednesbury unreasonableness, error of law, breaching the hearing or bias rules of natural justice.

One of the most important features of common law systems, considered to be an aspect of "equality before the law", is that judicial review is conducted by the ordinary courts and there are no special administrative or constitutional courts. A. V. Dicey observed in 1885: "In England the idea of legal equality, or of the universal subjection of all classes to one law administered by the ordinary courts, has been pushed to its utmost limit." Superior courts of general jurisdiction are traditionally regarded as having inherent jurisdiction to review administrative actions.

Section 75 of the Constitution of Australia provides that the High Court shall have original jurisdiction in matters including "(i) arising under any treaty (ii) affecting consuls or representatives of other countries (iii) in which the Commonwealth, or a person suing or being sued on behalf of the Commonwealth, is a party" (iv) between states or residents of different states, or between a state and a resident of a different state and "(v) in which a writ of mandamus or prohibition or an injunction is sought against an officer of the Commonwealth." Since this jurisdiction is conferred by the Constitution, it can be removed only by amending the Constitution, which requires a national referendum. Nor, by the same token, can it be restricted; for example, jurisdiction over decisions made under a particular statutory provision cannot be ousted by a privative clause. Section 76 of the Constitution allows the Commonwealth parliament to legislate for additions to the High Court's original jurisdiction; such additions can be removed or altered by repealing or amending that legislation.

The Federal Court has also been vested with original jurisdiction "with respect to any matter in which a writ of mandamus or prohibition or an injunction is sought against an officer or officers of the Commonwealth". This mirrors s75(v) of the Constitution, however it is important to keep in mind that the Federal Court is a creature of statute and therefore its jurisdiction is relatively easily changed by repealing or amending the Judiciary Act 1903.

=== "Matters" ===
The High Court's original jurisdiction is over "matters" as provided in Constitution sections 75, and 76. The Court has held, with a view to separation of powers, that the category "matter" is confined to issues that are appropriate for judicial determination, although the justices have taken a range of views upon what is appropriate. In general, however, the issue will constitute a "matter" if it requires an immediate determination of the legal rights and interests of an individual. In addition, hypothetical issues are not regarded as justiciable, since not involving a "matter". Further, whether a claim is justiciable may depend on whether the decision would rely upon "legal grounds" rather than "political considerations".

=== Justiciability ===
Under the doctrine of a strict separation of powers, courts can review only the "legality" (the legal validity) of executive decisions and actions, and not their "merits". This was emphasised by the High Court in Attorney-General (NSW) v Quin (1990), where Brennan J stated:

17. ... The duty and jurisdiction of the court to review administrative action do not go beyond the declaration and enforcing of the law which determines the limits and governs the exercise of the repository's power. If, in so doing, the court avoids administrative injustice or error, so be it; but the court has no jurisdiction simply to cure administrative injustice or error. The merits of administrative action, to the extent that they can be distinguished from legality, are for the repository of the relevant power and, subject to political control, for the repository alone.

However, the distinction between legality and merits can be difficult to make.

Unlike in the United States, and in the United Kingdom, there is no doctrine forbidding the courts from reviewing "political questions". While no specific exclusion exists it is likely that the courts would be reluctant to intervene in certain matters. Historically, the courts have generally not inquired into certain classes of administrative actions, such as decisions exercising the vice-regal "prerogative powers" or that involve foreign policy, a declaration of war, national security or the award of official honours. However, there is no general rule preventing this, and the courts sought to focus more on the individual circumstances of application and the nature of the power being used rather than categorical dismissal based on government powers.

The High Court has refused to rule on an Attorney-General's decision not to intervene in a case, and to intervene in the politically sensitive area of national security beyond the scope of judicial review. Furthermore, the justiciability of prerogative decisions cannot arise under the Administrative Decisions (Judicial Review) Act 1977 (Cth) as the Act is limited to decisions made "under an enactment" of the Commonwealth.

In addition, hypothetical issues are not justiciable. Similarly, polycentric disputes involving complex policy issues relating to the economic, political and social consequences, which are often marked by numerous, complex and intertwined issues, repercussions, and of the interests and people affected, could result in a finding the matter was non-justiciabile or a reluctance of the court to intervene.

=== Standing ===
The common law traditionally requires a plaintiff to show standing before being given the right to take action.

A 'special interest' in the subject matter of the action will confer standing on an individual. In order to prove a 'special interest', the plaintiff must demonstrate that they were affected to a substantially greater degree than or in a significantly different manner to the public. Only a select few cases exist where a person has gained standing with no 'special' interest in the matter. The plaintiff needs special interest peculiar to himself. "Special damage" is not limited to actual pecuniary loss and the words "peculiar to himself" do not mean that the plaintiff, and no one else, must have suffered the damage.

Claims based solely on public interest, an emotional or intellectual concern, or a mere desire to enforce a public duty will not confer standing. While the High Court has favoured a more liberal approach to standing, and the Australian Law Reform Commission has called for broader rules of standing, there has been a reluctance to embrace 'open' standing as favoured by Canadian courts.

In order to bring an application for judicial review under the Administrative Decisions (Judicial Review) Act 1977 (Cth), the applicant must be "a person who is aggrieved" by a reviewable decision made under an enactment. An aggrieved person is defined as a person whose interests are (or will be, or would be) "adversely affected by the decision", and can show that the grievance which will be suffered is beyond that which he or she has as an ordinary member of the public.

=== Reasons for an administrative decision ===
Administrative and judicial decision-makers are required under law to provide a written instrument, typically a written statement of reasons for their decisions. It is a statutory requirement for Statements of Reasons to be provided to an applicant for review under Commonwealth law for decisions of Commonwealth courts and administrative decision-makers under Section 13 of the Administrative Decisions (Judicial Review) Act 1977 (Cth), and similarly under Section 269 of the Administrative Review Tribunal Act 2024 (Cth).

=== Future ===
The Administrative Review Council conducted a comprehensive survey of federal judicial review of administrative action and delivered its report in September 2012.]

== Administrative Appeals Tribunal ==
The Administrative Appeals Tribunal (AAT) conducts independent merits review of administrative decisions made under Commonwealth laws. The AAT can review decisions made by Commonwealth ministers, departments and agencies. In some circumstances, decisions made by state governments, non-government bodies or under Norfolk Island law can also be reviewed. Within the scope of merits review, the Tribunal's duty is to make the correct or preferable decision in each case on the material before it.

The AAT was established by the Administrative Appeals Tribunal Act 1975 (Cth) as a hybrid between court and administrative agency. Among the tribunal's objectives is to provide a mechanism for review that upholds the ideas of being "fair, just, economical, informal and quick." The most significant underlying changes introduced with the AAT are the availability of review on the merits, and a right to obtain reasons for decisions.

On 1 July 2015, the Migration Review Tribunal (MRT), Refugee Review Tribunal (RRT) and Social Security Appeals Tribunal (SSAT) merged with the AAT.

The AAT has a standing requirement that must be satisfied before an application for review can be accepted. An application for review can be made by, or on behalf of, "any person or persons...whose interests are affected by the decision. A leading authority on the meaning of the phrase "interests are affected" is McHattan and Collector of Customs (NSW). An application for review can also be made by "an organisation or association of persons...if the decision relates to a matter included in the objects or purposes of the organisation or association". However, mere correlation to an organisation's objects or purposes will not grant standing as the relationship between the object of review and of the organisation must be 'real or genuine'.

The AAT was designed to be accessible. It is free to file an application for review of a decision listed in section 22 of the Administrative Appeals Tribunal Regulation 2015 which, among other things, includes some decisions made by Centrelink, decisions made with regards to military or veteran compensation, and some Freedom of Information decisions. For most other decisions, a standard application fee applies of A$884, however a reduced fee of $100 is available to those eligible for concession or who are experiencing financial hardship.

On 16 December 2022, the Hon Mark Dreyfus MP KC, the Commonwealth Attorney-General announced that the AAT will be abolished as "the former [Liberal] government fatally compromised the AAT ... by appointing 85 former Liberal MPs, failed Liberal candidates, former Liberal staffers and other close Liberal associates" to the body. The ABC reported that a quarter of senior AAT members did not have any legal qualifications. Federal Court Justice Susan Kenny was appointed as acting AAT President to oversee the transition process. On 14 October 2024, the AAT finally ceased operations and all casework was transitioned over to the new Administrative Review Tribunal.

== Administrative Review Tribunal ==
The Administrative Review Tribunal Act 2024 (Cth) brought the Administrative Review Tribunal (ART) into operation on 14 October 2024 to replace the former Administrative Appeals Tribunal. Although similar to the AAT, the ART made significant staffing and operational changes to improve perceptions of fairness, justice, and accessibility of the body.

== State administrative law tribunals ==
Some of the states and territories of Australia also have tribunals similar to the AAT. They vary in terms of the degree of formality, focus on mediation, procedure and jurisdiction.

=== Victoria ===
Victoria established the Victorian Civil and Administrative Tribunal in 1998.

=== New South Wales ===
The Administrative and Equal Opportunity Division of the New South Wales Civil and Administrative Tribunal was established in 2014. It replaced the Administrative Decisions Tribunal of New South Wales, previously established in 1998, alongside 21 other tribunals.

=== Western Australia ===
The State Administrative Tribunal of Western Australia was established in 2004.

=== Queensland ===
The Queensland Civil and Administrative Tribunal was established in 2009.

=== South Australia ===
The South Australian Civil and Administrative Tribunal was established in 2015.

=== In other states and territories ===
In South Australia and Tasmania, some of the functions of the tribunals are performed by the courts.

== Ombudsman ==
Both at Commonwealth level and in every State, there is an office of Ombudsman, with wide power to investigate action that relates to matters of administration.

An Ombudsman has an investigative role: firstly, to investigate complaints from members of the public; secondly, to undertake investigations upon the office's own initiative, termed "own motion" investigations.

The investigations are initially conducted privately, through preliminary inquiries. However, an Ombudsman has the same powers as a royal commission: to require attendance and examination of witnesses, to enter premises, to administer oaths and to require documents to be produced. If the Ombudsman believes that an agency has not taken appropriate action, it can report to the Prime Minister and thereafter to the parliament.

== Freedom of information ==
Australia was the first country with a Westminster system government to introduce freedom of information legislation, following the model established in the United States in 1966. The Freedom of Information Act 1982 (Cth) provides access to government information. Similar legislation is now in force in the Australian Capital Territory, and the individual States of Australia.

Freedom of information is designed to allow individuals access to personal and governmental information, and to allow individuals the opportunity to challenge and where appropriate have their personal information amended. It is also intended to provide open government.

Every person has a legally enforceable right to obtain access to a document of an agency or Minister, other than an exempt document, in accordance with the Act. Whether an item can be classified as a document for FOI purposes is assessed with regard to their relation to "the affairs of an agency or department." This means that many political, administrative and personal documents are beyond the reach of an application. Applications are made to the agency or Minister concerned.

There is a fee involved in making that application to the Commonwealth Government, although similar State legislation has often made access to personal information free. This object of this fee structure is "a means of deterring frivolous and excessively broad FOI requests". This application must then be acknowledged within 14 days and a decision made within 30 days.

In the 1999 Needs to Know report, the Ombudsman reported that the average charge per request rose from $123 in 1994-1995 to $239 in 1997-1998. There is evidence that some agencies have intentionally inflated charges in order to discourage applicants from pursuing claims.

A basic principle involved in the FOI regime is that standing is not an issue: that all members of the public should be entitled to access of government information irrespective of the purpose for which the information is sought. However, one obvious exception has been in the disclosure of personal information. Personal information is almost always exempted from disclosure, in order to protect individuals' private information.

Another very important object underlying the Act is the general intention of Parliament that government information should be disclosed and to encourage this disclosure. Accordingly, the Act uses language which indicates the discretion to deny access to information is just that: a discretion, and thereby encourages agencies to disclose documents or matter even where it may be exempt. There has also been an acknowledgement that general public interest arguments also should influence an agency decision to disclose.

=== Exemptions ===
There is a long list of general exemptions to freedom of information. Certain agencies, such as the Australian Security Intelligence Organisation, are given a blanket exemption. Exemptions also apply to documents held by contractors and those relating to commercial activities. Even within the scope of permitted material, there must be regard to the statutory boundary that Parliament has imposed.

Most exemptions are subject to a public interest test, with the onus on the agency to show that it would be contrary to the public interest to release a document coming under one of these heads.

Before 2009, Ministers could issue conclusive certification that a document or documents are exempt because disclosure would not be in the public interest. However, conclusive certificates were abolished in 2009.

=== Review ===
Parties unhappy with the decision of the agency or Minister may go to the next stage of external review, where the original decision to disclose or not disclose will be reconsidered. Under the Commonwealth Act, this external review function is undertaken by the Administrative Appeals Tribunal. Some States have this external review function vested in an Information Commissioner. Appeals from the AAT are to the Federal Court, and are ordinarily limited to a question of law.

Alternatively, the case may go under the ADJR act where it is a source of defining the scope of action to be included or excluded in judicial review and the jurisdiction of any court vested with the function of reviewing that executive action. The legislation is interpreted against a backdrop of other public policy law considerations concerning the legitimate scope of judicial review. The ADJR Act confers jurisdiction on the 'Federal Court and Federal Circuit Court to undertake review of 'a decision to which this Act applies', and 'conduct for the purpose of making a decision to which this Act applies'.

== Ultra vires ==
=== Simple ultra vires ===
A member of the executive wishing to exercise a decision-making or regulation-making power must have some law or legal authority that empowers or excuses their actions. This 'authority to decide' is known as jurisdiction. The High Court has applied the principle that no general power enables a government, the Governor-General or any other delegated legislation-maker to make regulations "which go outside the field of operation which the Act marks out for itself". This ultra vires, known as jurisdictional error is where the decision maker either: exceeds the jurisdiction, by 'flouting a statutory limitation, breaching natural justice, asking the wrong question or being wrongly constituted' i.e. the decision is invalid; or fails to exercise its jurisdiction to make a particular decision.

=== Abuse of power ===
Administrative decisions, including those exercising a discretionary power, must be designed to achieve a purpose or object authorised by the empowering legislation.

=== Procedural fairness ===
The doctrine of procedural fairness, or natural justice, stems from common law and was associated with the jurisprudential tradition of natural law. The courts have emphasised its flexible character, with Justice Brennan referring to the "chameleon-like" character of its rules.

Procedural fairness encompasses the prior hearing rule and the bias rule. The right to procedural fairness is assumed to exist in administrative decision-making environments, except where it is clearly excluded by statute. Since the 1960s, the courts have tended to extend the right to procedural fairness to matters where not only legal rights are at stake but also the "legitimate expectations" of protection of various interests, notably commercial interests, employment, individual liberty and reputation. In particular, procedural fairness applies when an administrative decision-maker has made an allegation that is credible, relevant and damaging and when a decision is made that will affect a right, interest or legitimate expectation of a person. However, there is controversy around the scope of "legitimate expectations" and the High Court has said that the focus should be on whether an individual's interests were affected. However, there is no obligation to accord natural justice beyond the statute. An example of procedural fairness is that a defendant has a right to respond to a case being made against them.

== Judicial remedies ==
At common law, the traditional remedies are the prerogative writs, (Note: The term was used because it was protecting the prerogative of the Crown in relation to the administration of justice. In Australia there is often a statutory basis for the writs, see for example Supreme Court Act (NSW) s 69) referred to as "constitutional writs" in the exercise of federal judicial power, (Note: s 75(v) of the Constitution, provides that they are part of the original jurisdiction of the High Court.) – principally certiorari, (Note: Certiorari is not a remedy within s 75(v) of the Constitution, however the High Court has held it is ancillary or incidental to the effective exercise of prohibition and mandamus.) (Note: Re Refugee Review Tribunal; Ex parte Aala [2000] HCA 57, (2000) 204 CLR 82) prohibition, and mandamus, and the former equitable remedies, declarations and injunctions.

Certiorari is granted either on two grounds: error of law on face of the record or jurisdictional error. Certiorari can only be granted if it is "possible to identify a decision which has a discernible or apparent legal effect upon rights". Certiorari may also be granted to correct errors of law that can be established on the face of the record. "The record" includes documents that initiate proceedings, pleadings of the parties, ultimate order in the proceedings etc. However, it does not include transcripts of proceedings, exhibits, or the reasons given for decisions, unless the tribunal chooses to incorporate reasons.

Mandamus is granted by a superior court to command the fulfilment of a duty of a public nature that remains unperformed and for which no other specific legal remedy is available.

The main statutory remedies are those available at the federal level under the Administrative Decisions (Judicial Review) Act 1977 (Cth), or under similar judicial review legislation at the State level in Victoria, Queensland, Tasmania, and the Australian Capital Territory. ' s 75(v) of the Constitution entrenches the jurisdiction of the High Court in relation to matters where mandamus, prohibition and injunction are claimed against an officer of the Commonwealth.

== See also ==
- Canadian administrative law
- United States administrative law
- Whistleblower protection in Australia
