= Financial Ombudsman Service (Australia) =

- Predecessor: Financial Industry Complaints Service; Banking and Financial Services Ombudsman
- Successor: Australian Financial Complaints Authority (AFCA)
- Formation: 1 July 2008
- Dissolved: 31 October 2018
- Type: Ombudsman
- Location: Melbourne, Victoria, Australia
- Region served: Australia
- Members: Australian banks, insurers, credit providers, financial advisers and planners, debt collection agencies and other businesses that provide financial products and services
- Chief Ombudsman: David Locke
- Affiliations: Australian Securities & Investments Commission
- Staff: 293 FTE (2016)
- Website: www.fos.org.au

The Financial Ombudsman Service (FOS) was a member-funded Australian ombudsman service that provided external dispute resolution for consumers who were unable to resolve complaints with member financial services organisations. The Financial Ombudsman Service was superseded in 2018 by the Australian Financial Complaints Authority (AFCA).

Prior to being dissolved, in 2016 the FOS had approximately 5,500 licensed member organisations that included banks, insurers, credit providers, financial advisers and planners, debt collection agencies and other businesses that provide financial products and services; together with an additional 8,000 authorised credit representatives. The Service was governed by its term of reference which allowed for it to hear matters within six years of the first knowledge of a financial loss and for the Service to award remedies capped at A$309,000. In 2015–6, the FOS received 34,095 disputes and closed 32,871 disputes; a seven per cent increase on the number of disputes received during the previous year and a five per cent decrease on the number of disputes closed.

The FOS was led by the Chief Ombudsman, David Locke. He is supported by lead ombudsmen for banking and finance, general insurance, and investment and advice; with ten other ombudsmen supporting various functional areas and disputes.

== History ==
=== Foundation ===
The FOS was established on 1 July 2008 following the merger of the Financial Industry Complaints Service (FICS) with the Banking and Financial Services Ombudsman (BFSO) and Insurance Ombudsman Service (IOS); all of which were industry self-regulatory bodies. Two additional schemes chose to merge with the FOS later in 2009, the Credit Union Dispute Resolution Centre and the Insurance Brokers Disputes Limited.

=== Senate complaint ===
In 2015 a complaint was raised in Submission 134 to the Senate committee on the scrutiny of financial advice concerning six conversations between the Ombudsman and a consumer's representative, who had recorded the telephone conversation. Submission 134 made it clear that there were differences between the telephone recordings and the working notes of those conversations made by the Ombudsman. Thereafter the Ombudsman was reported by media as having confirmed "the decision to refer the matter to a court given the complexity of the dispute, the inability of the FOS to cross examine all relevant witnesses and compel the production of information from third parties, as well as the need to engage experts", even though in recordings of the conversations the same Ombudsman said the only reason to dismiss the complaint was lack of staff, that the complaint had merit and that if the FOS had staff they would have ruled the dispute inside jurisdiction. It was this decision that subsequently resulted in Supreme Court proceedings to challenge the jurisdictional decision of the FOS not to handle the particular complaint.

The FOS did not respond in substance. ASIC did not respond to the questions and, since the filing, other senators called for the FOS to explain the circumstances. ASIC appeared before the Joint Committee on Corporations and Financial Services on 16 March 2015, where it stated that the Court dealt with the issue of the misleading file notes. On 19 June 2015, the Supreme Court of Victoria found in the FOS's favour but it did not address the discrepancies in materials. The Court stated in its judgment that it did not examine any issues beyond the actual decision of the FOS itself, thus it did not examine any materials (including the file notes and the recordings), nor did it dealt with any allegations of misconduct. The FOS released a media statement attempting to dismiss the allegations and rely on the ruling by the court. The statement did not address allegations in the submission about misleading file notes presented in the discovery phase of a trial. Following media coverage of this case there were calls by a number of Australian senators, including Senator Nick Xenophon, for the FOS to be disbanded and replaced with a government funded body.

Despite criticism of the FOS, consumer advocacy group CHOICE and the government regulator, ASIC, are generally supportive of the FOS. CHOICE has stated that "while there is room for improvement, the Financial Ombudsman Service is providing an essential service of a high standard." Furthermore, ASIC have continued to support the FOS as an 'approved EDR scheme'.

In November 2016, the FOS attempted to explain limitations to its capability to enforce its rulings when financial services providers would not or were unable to pay compensation in cases decided in a consumer's favour. In such cases, consumers may have to seek formal Court-based enforcement proceedings or assistance from the industry regulator. The FOS has proposed an industry funded 'compensation scheme of last resort' be established to help pay consumers their awarded compensation if left stranded by insolvent or belligerent providers.

=== Government review ===
In 2016 the government announced a review into Australia's EDR schemes for the financial system, including the FOS. In November 2016 a Lower House parliamentary committee, which has a majority of incumbent government MPs, recommended a banking tribunal be established to replace the FOS, the Credit and Investments Ombudsman and the Superannuation Complaints Tribunal. In December 2016 an Australian Treasury appointed panel agreed that the FOS needs an added accountability mechanism in the form of an independent auditor.

=== Dissolution ===
On 1 November 2018, the Australian Financial Complaints Authority launched as the one ombudsman service for all financial complaints, replacing three predecessor schemes, the Financial Ombudsman Service, the Credit and Investments Ombudsman and the Superannuation Complaints Tribunal.

== Resolution process ==
The FOS only considered a complaint after the customer has first attempted and failed to resolve their complaint directly with their financial services provider. Most disputes with financial services providers in Australia were resolved between the customer and the relevant bank, credit provider, insurance company or other financial services provider. However, if a dispute was not able to be resolved directly, FOS could then consider it.

The FOS could make an official recommendation or determination and require a financial services provider to;

- pay a sum of money
- waive, vary the terms or release security for a debt
- repay, waive or vary a fee including interest rates on a loan
- vary the terms of a credit contract in cases of financial hardship
- honour an insurance policy claim.

The complainant (but not the financial services provider) may accept or reject the determination within 30 days of receiving it. If the complainant accepts the determination, it is binding on both parties. Dispute resolution by the FOS is free of charge for consumers.

== Governance ==
The FOS was governed by a board of consumer representatives and financial services industry representatives. The Chair of the Board between 2015 and its dissolution was Professor the Hon. Michael Lavarch AO. The organisation was structured as a public company limited by guarantee, called the Financial Ombudsman Service Limited, which was the owner of the FOS. The company was approved by the Australian Securities & Investments Commission (ASIC) at that time in accordance with Regulatory Guide 139.

== See also ==
- Australian Securities & Investments Commission
- Credit and Investments Ombudsman
- Ombudsmen in Australia
- Superannuation Complaints Tribunal
