= Administrative Decisions (Judicial Review) Act 1977 =

Australian legislation

Parliament of Australia
- Long title: An Act relating to the Review on Questions of Law of certain Administrative Decisions
- Citation: No. 59 of 1977 or No. 59, 1977 as amended
- Territorial extent: States and territories of Australia
- Assented to: 16 June 1977
- Administered by: Attorney-General of Australia
- Status: In force

Administrative Decisions (Judicial Review) Act 1977 (Cth) is an act of the Parliament of Australia, which created the ability to appeal the decision at the Federal Court of Australia for a person or other parties affected by most administrative decisions by an Australian federal department or agency. Review of administrative decisions under the Act is limited to matters of law.

== Legacy ==
In 1989, the then president of the New South Wales Court of Appeal Michael Kirby wrote that the Administrative Decisions (Judicial Review) Act and the Administrative Appeals Tribunal Act 1975 were "probably the most adventurous and far-reaching legal reforms" to have taken place in Australia. In a 2011 seminar, the president of the Administrative Appeals Tribunal Garry Downes wrote that, of the reforms of administrative law in the 1970s and 1980s, (including the establishment of the Federal Court, the Commonwealth Ombudsman, and the Administrative Appeals Tribunal) the Administrative Decisions (Judicial Review) Act was the most significant legislative work of the reform.

== Bibliography ==
- Sykes, Edward Irving (1997). General Principles of Administrative Law (1997 ed.). Butterworths. ISBN 0409309869.
