= Australian Financial Complaints Authority =

Australian external dispute resolution company

- Abbreviation: AFCA
- Predecessor: Financial Ombudsman Service (FOS); Credit and Investments Ombudsman (CIO); Superannuation Complaints Tribunal (SCT)
- Formation: 1 November 2018; 8 years ago
- Type: Ombudsman
- Legal status: Nonprofit organization
- Purpose: Financial dispute resolution
- Location: Melbourne, Victoria, Australia
- Region served: Australia
- Members: Australian banks, insurers, credit providers, financial advisers and planners, debt collection agencies, superannuation members and other businesses that provide financial products and services
- Chief Ombudsman: David Locke
- Affiliations: Australian Securities & Investments Commission (ASIC)
- Funding: Membership fees
- Website: www.afca.org.au

The Australian Financial Complaints Authority or AFCA is an Australian external dispute resolution (EDR) company for consumers who are unable to resolve complaints with member financial services organisations. It is operated as a not-for-profit company limited by guarantee and was authorised in 2018 by the then Minister for Revenue and Financial Services, Kelly O'Dwyer, in accordance with the Corporations Act 2001 (Cth).

Membership of AFCA is a requirement under law or license condition of all financial firms and financial service providers that provide services in Australia. AFCA is led by the Chief Ombudsman and CEO, presently David Locke.

AFCA replaced the three pre-existing EDR schemes of the Financial Ombudsman Service (FOS), the Credit and Investments Ombudsman (CIO) and Superannuation Complaints Tribunal (SCT).

== History ==
The Australian Financial Complaints Authority was established on 1 November 2018, replacing the Financial Ombudsman Service (FOS), the Credit and Investments Ombudsman (CIO) and the Superannuation Complaints Tribunal (SCT). The Australian Government announced on 9 May 2017 that AFCA would be established in response to the review of external dispute resolution and complaints arrangements in the financial system.

== Operations and processes ==
=== Rules ===
The Rules of AFCA outline the types of complaints that AFCA can consider, as well as their procedures, remedies and reporting obligations. The rules were approved by the Australian Securities & Investments Commission (ASIC) on 12 September 2018.

=== Resolution process ===
The AFCA only considers a complaint after the consumer has first attempted to resolve the dispute directly with their financial service provider. If the dispute is unable to be resolved or the outcome is unsatisfactory, AFCA can then consider it.

Complaints can be filed with AFCA through an online form on their website. An AFCA representative will then contact the consumer and relevant financial service provider to settle the dispute. In the case a settlement cannot be reached, an AFCA case analyst will develop a balanced solution. The consumer can then either accept the proposed settlement from AFCA or take their dispute to court.

=== Governance ===
The Australian Financial Complaints Authority is governed by a Board of Directors, which includes equal numbers of industry and consumer representatives. The Independent Chair of the Board is Helen Coonan. The Board appoints an independent Chief Ombudsman and CEO, presently David Locke.

=== Funding ===
AFCA is funded by its member financial firms through annual membership and complaint fees.

=== Public data ===
AFCA publishes aggregate data relating to complaints, as well as the published outcomes and summaries of determinations. Coded determinations are also available which provide a richer analysis of the data from determinations, and more flexibility and specificity when searching past determinations.

== See also ==
- Australian Securities and Investments Commission
- Credit and Investments Ombudsman
- Ombudsmen in Australia
- Superannuation Complaints Tribunal
- Financial Ombudsman Service (Australia)
- List of financial supervisory authorities by country
