= Julian Gardner =

Julian Gardner may refer to:

- Julian Gardner (poker player) (born 1978), British professional poker player
- Julian Gardner (lawyer), Australian lawyer noted for his advancement of human rights
- Julian Gardner (rugby union) (born 1964), Australian rugby union player
- Julian Gardner (art historian) (born 1940), British art historian
