= COSL =

COSL may refer to:

- Credit ombudsman service Limited, an External/Alternate Dispute Resolution Scheme in Australia
- China Oilfield Services, a Chinese petroleum services company
- Luxembourgian Olympic and Sporting Committee, Luxembourg's National Olympic Committee
- Citicorp Overseas Software Limited, Citicorp Overseas Software Limited, Mumbai, India. This was the origin of current 'Oracle Financial Services'
