= ASIC v Kobelt =

Judgement of the High Court of Australia

Australian Securities and Investments Commission v Kobelt
- Court: High Court of Australia
- Decided: 12 June 2019
- Citation: [2019] HCA 18
- Transcripts: [2018] HCATrans 252 [2018] HCATrans 153

Case history
- Prior actions: [2018] FCAFC 18 [2016] FCA 1327

Court membership
- Judges sitting: Kiefel CJ, Bell, Gageler, Keane, Nettle, Gordon & Edelman JJ

Case opinions
- appeal dismissed (per Kiefel CJ, Bell JJ) (Keane J) (Gageler J) dissenting (Nettle J) (Gordon J) (Edelman J)

Australian Securities and Investments Commission v Kobelt is a decision of the High Court of Australia. It was an appeal brought by Australian Securities & Investments Commission (ASIC) against a Mr Kobelt, seeking to overturn a unanimous decision of the Federal Court. It had been found that while Kobelt had contravened s29(1) of the National Consumer Credit Protection Act 2009 (Cth) (for engaging in "credit activity" unlicensed), he did not engage in "unconscionable conduct in connection with financial services" in contravention with s12CB(1) of the ASIC Act.

A majority of the High Court dismissed ASIC's appeal.

== Factual background ==
The respondent to the appeal, Kobelt, ran a general store in Mintabie, South Australia. He was found by the Federal Court to have supplied credit to customers at his store via a system referred to as a "book-up" credit system. Most credit was supplied for the purchase of used cars. Customers were not required to pay for goods up front, but had to provide their bank cards and PINs to Kobelt. Once their bank accounts received money, Kobalt would draw down the accounts over multiple transactions until the funds had all been withdrawn. As the accounts were immediately reduced to zero upon payment, customers were left unable to buy food and other essentials, so Kobelt would allow them to spend up to 50% of the money deducted on any given payday; to pay for groceries at his store. This tied them to his store and other stores in Mintabie.

Kobelt kept poor records of the amount owed by each customer. His customers were, according to the court, "characterized by their poverty and low levels of literacy and numeracy, which relevantly meant that they lacked financial literacy". Most were Indigenous Aṉangu people. He held onto their bank cards at all times, except when they departed from the Aṉangu Pitjantjatjara Yankunytjatjara Lands. He would then return the cards on condition that they give it back upon their return. Kobelt's record keeping practices preventing him from knowing the remaining balances within his customer's accounts.

The trial judge had found that Kobelt had engaged in credit activity while unlicensed, and that his conduct was unconscionable, in violation of s12CB(1) of the ASIC Act. The Full Federal Court upheld the unlicensed credit finding, but unanimously held he had not engaged in the relevant form of unconscionable conduct.

== Decision ==
=== Majority decision ===
The majority of the High Court decided that Kobelt had not engaged in the relevant form of unconscionable conduct under the act. The majority consisted of three sets of reasons, one jointly written by Kiefel CJ and Bell JJ; while the others were written by Keane J and Gageler J.

==== Kiefel CJ and Bell J ====
Kiefel and Bell first discussed the standard of conscience "fixed" by s12CB(1) of the ASIC act. They found that the term "unconscionable" was to be understood as bearing its "ordinary meaning". They stated that the values that informed that standard included those identified by Allsop CJ in Paciocco v ANZ; which included, relevantly;

"the protection of those whose vulnerability as to the protection of their own interests places them in a position that calls for a just legal system to respond for their protection, especially from those who would victimise, predate or take advantage"

The justices considered this determinative of the appeal. They concluded that "The difficulty with ASIC’s system case of statutory unconscionability lies in identifying any advantage that Mr Kobelt obtained from the supply of book-up credit that can fairly be said to be against conscience."

Due to the lack of relevant vulnerability, it followed there was an "absence of unconscientious advantage obtained by Mr Kobelt ... under his book-up system". The pair moved to dismiss ASIC's appeal.

==== Keane J ====
Keane agreed with the judgement of Kiefel and Bell, and found additionally that ASIC "did not establish that the respondent exploited his customers’ socio-economic vulnerability in order to extract financial advantage from them." Keane found that Kobelt had not victimized his customers for financial gain. He pointed out that ASIC's argument that Kobelt had a high degree of bargaining power was overstated as the customers could have decided to take collective action against him.

==== Gageler J ====
Gageler J agreed with the proposed orders of Kiefel, Bell and Keane, but followed different reasoning.

=== Dissent ===
Nettle, Gordon, and Edelman dissented, finding that Kobelt's book-up system was unconscionable in the relevant statutory sense.

==== Nettle and Gordon JJ ====
Nettle and Gordon noted that the dispute centred around whether the transactions could be considered voluntary. They wrote:

"It is important to appreciate, therefore, that considerations of voluntariness need to be assessed in the context of the system of conduct in issue. Conduct can be unconscionable even where the innocent party is a willing participant; the question is how that willingness or intention was produced. An innocent party may be capable of making an independent or rational judgment about an advantage in an otherwise bad bargain. However, an advantage, and the capacity of the innocent party to identify that advantage and make a rational choice, cannot operate to transform what is, in all the circumstances, an exploitative arrangement. Nor can the existence of that advantage absolve from liability the stronger party who unconscientiously takes advantage of the weaker party." - Nettle and Gordon JJ at [157]

==== Edelman J ====
Edelman described the choice of participating in the book-up credit scheme as "Hobson's choice - no matter how badly they need credit, they can either “choose” that system or “choose” no credit at all.”

Agreeing with Nettle and Gordon JJ, Edelman drew upon the notion of unconscionability at equity to inform the legal standard applicable. He pointed to the legislative history of s12CC, and found Parliamentary intention to extend the section beyond prior interpretations of its meaning.

== Reception and commentary ==
Professor Katy Barnett of Melbourne Law School wrote of the decision: "The difference in approach between the majority and the minority appears to come down to a difference of opinion in values, which flows through to the way in which they judge the voluntariness of the transactions. (The result) may be difficult to apply in future cases."

== See also ==
- Commercial Bank of Australia Ltd v Amadio
- Unconscionability in English law
