= Jane Mathews =

Australian judge (1940–2019)

The Honourable Justice Jane Mathews AO

Judge of the Federal Court of Australia
- In office 4 July 1994 – 6 April 2001

President Administrative Appeals Tribunal
- In office 1994–1999

Judge of the Supreme Court of NSW
- In office 7 July 1987 – 3 July 1994

Acting Judge of the Supreme Court of NSW & Judge of Appeal
- In office 2001–2018

Personal details
- Born: 19 December 1940 Wollongong, NSW, Australia
- Died: 31 August 2019 (aged 78)
- Education: Frensham School; University of Sydney (Women's College)
- Occupation: Judge, Crown Prosecutor, Lawyer

Jane Hamilton Mathews AO (19 December 1940 – 31 August 2019) was a judge of the Supreme Court of New South Wales, a judge of the Federal Court of Australia and President of the Administrative Appeals Tribunal.

== Early life and education ==
Mathews was born in Wollongong, NSW, the daughter of Frank Mathews, the Chief Engineer of the BHP Steel Works at Port Kembla and went to school at Frensham School in Mittagong. Mathews studied law at the University of Sydney, residing at the Women's College in 1958 & 59, graduating with a Bachelor of Laws in 1961.

== Career ==
At the time admission as a solicitor required both a law degree and a period as an articled clerk. Mathews did her articles with Dawson Waldron Edwards & Nichols, where she was the first female articled clerk and was admitted as a solicitor in 1962. Mathews returned to Wollongong with Beale and Geddes until 1965 when she worked at Allen, Allen & Hemsley.

Mathews became a barrister in 1969, practising in criminal law and was appointed counsel assisting the Royal Commission on Human Relationships which had broad terms of reference to "inquire into and report upon the family, social, educational, legal and sexual aspects of male and female relationships". The Commission covered topics as diverse as abortion, domestic violence, the police and courts’ treatment of rape victims and discrimination faced by gays and lesbians. The Commission ran from 1974 until 1977. Following which Mathews was appointed a Crown Prosecutor in 1977.

Ruth McColl described Mathews as a multiple member of the FW2 club, being the first woman appointed a judge in NSW, (Note: Margaret Sleeman was appointed a NSW Magistrate on 27 July 1970, however magistrates were not judicial officers until 1986: "History of New South Wales courts and tribunals".) first woman appointed to the Supreme Court of NSW and first woman President of the Administrative Appeals Tribunal. Mathews initial appointment as a judge was to the District Court of NSW in 1980, during which she was also appointed as a part-time Commissioner of the NSW Law Reform Commission from 1984 to 1989 and as head of the NSW Equal Opportunity Commission from 1985 to 1987.

In addition to her legal career, Mathews was Deputy Chancellor of the University of NSW from 1992 until 1999. She was also President of the International Association of Women Judges and patron of the Women Lawyers Association of NSW.

=== Supreme Court of NSW ===
Mathews was the first woman to be appointed a judge of the NSW Supreme Court in 1987 and only the second woman in Australia to be appointed to a Supreme Court after Roma Mitchell in South Australia in 1965. Mathews resigned to become the President of the Administrative Appeals Tribunal in 1994 however returned to the NSW Supreme Court as an Acting Judge and Acting Judge of Appeal from 2001. Mathews retired as an acting judge in 2018 on reaching the age of 77.

=== Federal Court of Australia ===
In 1994 the Attorney-General Michael Lavarch offered Mathews the role of President of the Administrative Appeals Tribunal which involved being appointed to the Federal Court. Mathews was also appointed, at her request, to the Native Title Tribunal. Mathews was not the first woman appointed to the Federal Court, that being Deirdre O'Connor who was appointed in 1990.

In 1996 Mathews was appointed to prepare a report on Aboriginal Heritage issues in relation to the Hindmarsh Island bridge controversy. The High Court held that her appointment, even though conferred on Mathews personally (referred to as persona designata), was incompatible with her role as a federal judge. Mathews resigned from the Federal Court in 2001 to return as an acting judge of the Supreme Court of NSW.

== Honours ==
In 1993, Mathews was given an honorary Doctor of Laws by the University of Wollongong, not only for her ground breaking work as a lawyer and judge, but also for her work in establishing the faculty of law at the University of Wollongong. In 2000, Mathews was given an honorary doctorate of law by the University of Sydney. In 2005 Mathews was made an Officer of the Order of Australia for service to the judiciary, to the legal profession, to the University of NSW, and to music.

== Personal life ==
In 1976 she married Hal Wootten, but they later divorced.

== Death ==
Mathews died on 31 August 2019. A State Memorial Service was held at the Playhouse, Sydney Opera House, on 18 October 2019.

== See also ==
List of Judges of the Supreme Court of New South Wales

Legal offices
| Preceded by Deirdre O'Connor | President Administrative Appeals Tribunal; 1994–1999 | Succeeded by Deirdre O'Connor |
