= Administrative Review Tribunal =

Australian tribunal

Agency overview
- Formed: 24 October 2024
- Preceding agency: Administrative Appeals Tribunal
- Jurisdiction: Australia
- Minister responsible: Michelle Rowland, Attorney-General of Australia
- Agency executive: Justice Emilios Kyrou, President
- Parent department: Attorney-General's Department
- Key document: Administrative Review Tribunal Act 2024 (Cth)
- Website: art.gov.au

The Administrative Review Tribunal (ART) is an Australian tribunal that conducts independent merits review of administrative decisions made under Commonwealth laws of the Australian Government. The ART reviews decisions made by Australian Government ministers, departments and agencies, and in limited circumstances, decisions made by state government and non-government bodies. They also review decisions made under Norfolk Island laws. It is not a court and not part of the Australian court hierarchy; however, its decisions are subject to review by the Federal Court of Australia and the Federal Circuit Court of Australia. The ART was established by the Administrative Review Tribunal Act 2024 and started operation on 14 October 2024. The ART replaces the now-abolished Administrative Appeal Tribunal.

== Origins ==
=== Abolition of the AAT ===
Public support in the AAT declined in the years before its abolition, with self-represented participants rating the independence of the AAT in a user survey at 3.5 out of a maximum of 5. This was much lower than the ratings given by legal practitioners (4.4/5) and government agencies (4.8/5). Former President, Justice Gary Downes, suggested that the results indicated "individual applicants see the Tribunal as a continuum in the decision-making process and not necessarily as an independent body".

Prior to its abolition on 14 October 2024, 70 of the 320 (22%) AAT members had a direct political connection to the government that appointed them, and were, on average, appointed for longer terms than members without political affiliations. In comparison, across all other Australian Government public appointees, only 7% had direct political connections to the government that appointed them.

In March 2022, the Senate Legal and Constitutional Affairs Committee reported on the performance and integrity of the administrative review system in Australia. The report found that the AAT:

- was not fulfilling its role to instil confidence and trust in the administrative review process;
- did not function effectively, efficiently or transparently;
- had become politicised, with the awarding of lucrative, long-term appointments without regard to the qualifications or legal expertise of the applicants; and
- provided too much discretionary power to the Attorney-General, which allowed for appointments based on political patronage, rather than merit.

On 16 December 2022, Attorney-General Mark Dreyfus announced that the Australian Government would abolish the AAT, and that "the AAT's public standing has been irreversibly damaged as a result of the actions of the former government over the last nine years." Claims made by Mark Dreyfus in support of abolishing the AAT included that former Liberal MPs, candidates, staffers and associates had been appointed to the AAT without any merit-based selection process.

=== Formation ===
The ART was established by the Administrative Review Tribunal Act 2024 and commenced operations on 14 October 2024. The intention of creating the ART was to do so in response to recommendations by the Senate Legal and Constitutional Affairs Committee report on the performance and integrity of the administrative review system, published in March 2022. The report recommended the abolition of the AAT and the establishment of a new body, with a transparent, merit-based appointment process.

== Organisation ==
The ART manages their workload by reference to jurisdictional areas, currently being:

Jurisdictional Area	Jurisdictional Area Leader	List
General	Gina Lazanas	Child Support
General	Gina Lazanas	Information and Other
Intelligence and Security	Justice Emilios Kyrou	Intelligence and Security
Migration	Kate Millar	Study, Visitor and Other Visas
Migration	Kate Millar	Family and Partner Visas
Migration	Kate Millar	Working, Skilled and Investment Visas
Migration	Kate Millar	Character, Citizenship and Bridging Visas
National Disability Insurance Scheme	Kruna Dordevic	Plans
National Disability Insurance Scheme	Kruna Dordevic	Access
Protection	Simone Burford	China
Protection	Simone Burford	India
Protection	Simone Burford	Malaysia
Protection	Simone Burford	Vietnam
Protection	Simone Burford	Africa, Americas, Middle East and South Asia Countries
Social Security	Kruna Dordevic	Centrelink
Social Security	Kruna Dordevic	Paid Parental Leave
Taxation and Business	Gina Lazanas	Taxation
Taxation and Business	Gina Lazanas	Regulation and Discipline
Veterans' and Workers' Compensation	Gina Lazanas	Veterans
Veterans' and Workers' Compensation	Gina Lazanas	Workers' Compensation

== Jurisdiction ==
The ART has jurisdiction to review a decision if the individual statute empowering the Australian Government agency allows for an application to be referred to a review tribunal, of which the ART estimates there to be more than 400 statutes that do so.

The Tribunal is not a court. The High Court has long held that the Australian Constitution, mandates a separation of powers between the executive, legislative and judicial branches of government. Judicial review of administrative decisions takes place in courts, such as the Federal Court and the Federal Circuit Court. The ART remains part of the executive branch of government.

In addition to new powers, the ART also retains the same powers and procedures that the AAT held.

== Structure ==
The ART consists of the President and the other members who may be appointed as:

- Deputy Presidents;
- Senior Members; or
- Members.

The President is responsible for the overall management of the Tribunal with the assistance of Division Heads and the Registrar. Staff are employed under the Public Service Act 1999 (Cth) to assist the ART to carry out its functions.

A Chief Executive Officer and Principal Registrar is a statutory officer appointed by the governor-general. The current chief executive officer and Principal Registrar is Michael Hawkins. The Chief Executive Officer and Principal Registrar is the accountable authority under the Public Governance, Performance and Accountability Act 2013 (Cth) and agency head for the purposes of the Public Service Act 1999 (Cth).

The President of the ART must be a judge of the Federal Court of Australia. The ART's other members may be:

- judges of the Federal Court and Federal Circuit and Family Court of Australia (part-time Deputy Presidents);
- lawyers of at least five years' standing; or
- persons of relevant knowledge or skills.

== See also ==
- Judiciary of Australia
- List of Commonwealth courts and tribunals
