= National Alternative Dispute Resolution Advisory Council =

The National Alternative Dispute Resolution Advisory Council (NADRAC) was an Australian independent body that provided policy advice about alternative dispute resolution (ADR) to the Attorney-General of Australia. NADRAC was established in October 1995 and concluded in late 2013. NADRAC's functions were laid down by its charter.

NADRAC was an independent non-statutory body, with funding provided through the Australian Government Attorney-General's Department. It provided expert policy advice to the Attorney-General on the development of ADR and promoted the use of alternative dispute resolution.

The body concluded its work following the government decision to simplify and streamline government business. NADRAC made substantial contributions to the development and promotion of ADR in Australia, publishing reports and papers on the topic.

== Council members ==
- Jeremy Gormly SC (chair)
- Professor Nadja Alexander
- Dr Andrew Bickerdike
- Mr David Fredericks
- Ms Dianne Gibson
- The Hon Justice Andrew Greenwood
- Ms Margaret Halsmith
- Mr Tom Howe QC
- Mr Peter Kell
- Mr Stephen Lancken
- Ms Helen Marks
- Ms Lindsay Smith
- Professor Tania Sourdin

== See also ==
- Mediation
- Mediation in Australia
