= Emilios Kyrou =

Australian judge

The Honourable Justice Emilios Kyrou AO

President of the Administrative Review Tribunal
- Incumbent
- Assumed office 14 October 2024

Judge of the Federal Court of Australia
- Incumbent
- Assumed office 8 June 2023

Personal details
- Born: 8 November 1959 (age 66) Sfikia, Imathia, Greece
- Education: LLB Law (Hons); BCom Commerce
- Alma mater: University of Melbourne
- Occupation: Judge, Lawyer
- Writing career
- Notable works: Call Me Emilios (2012); Lewis & Kyrou's Handy Hints on Legal Practice (2018); Victorian Administrative Law (1985)

Emilios Kyrou (Greek: Αιμίλιος Κύρου; born 8 November 1959) AO is a Greek-Australian jurist and former lawyer. He is the inaugural President of the Administrative Review Tribunal and was the last President of its predecessor, the former Administrative Appeals Tribunal. He has served as a judge of the Federal Court of Australia since 8 June 2023.

Between 2014 and 2023, Kyrou served as a judge of the Court of Appeal, Supreme Court of Victoria. Justice Kyrou was a judge in the Trial Division of that court between 2008 and 2014.

Before his appointment to the Supreme Court of Victoria, Kyrou was a partner at Mallesons Stephen Jaques (now King & Wood Mallesons), where his areas of practice included insurance law, government law and dispute resolution.

Kyrou is the author of several leading legal texts, a commentator on law reform and supporter of pro bono work.

== Background ==
Emilios Kyrou was born in 1959 in the village of Sfikia, Imathia, Greece. He was 8 years of age when he arrived in Australia with his family in 1968.

In 1982, he completed a law degree at University of Melbourne, where he also served as an assistant editor of the Melbourne University Law Review. Kyrou graduated with first class honours and was awarded the 1982 Supreme Court Prize as the Melbourne Law School's top law graduate.

He served articles at Corrs Pavey Whiting and Byrne (now Corrs Chambers Westgarth) and was admitted to practice in April 1984. In 1988, Kyrou was made a partner of Corrs.

In 1990, Kyrou moved to Mallesons Stephen Jaques where he served as a partner for 17 years before he was appointed to the bench of the Supreme Court of Victoria.

In 2012, Kyrou published a partial autobiography titled Call Me Emilios about his experiences as a child migrant.

Kyrou is the only Greek-born judge to have been appointed to a superior court in Australia. He is also the second practising solicitor to be appointed directly as a justice of the Supreme Court of Victoria.

== Awards and distinctions ==
Kyrou has won numerous awards and distinctions.

Of particular note, the President of Greece awarded Justice Kyrou the Gold Cross of the Order of Merit for service to the Greek-Australian community in 2015.

In the 2023 Australia Day Honours, Justice Kyrou was appointed an Officer (AO) of the Order of Australia "for distinguished service to the judiciary and to the law, to professional associations, and to the community".

== See also ==
- Administrative Appeals Tribunal
- Judiciary of Australia
- List of Judges of the Supreme Court of Victoria
- Victorian Bar Association
