= Competition and Consumer Act 2010 =

Act of the Parliament of Australia

Parliament of Australia
- Long title: An Act relating to competition, fair trading and consumer protection, and for other purposes
- Citation: No. 51 of 1974
- Territorial extent: Australia
- Enacted by: House of Representatives
- Enacted: 23 August 1974 (with amendments from the Senate)
- Passed by: Senate
- Passed: 15 August 1974
- Royal assent: 17 September 1974
- Commenced: 1 October 1974

Legislative history

Initiating chamber: House of Representatives
- Bill title: Trade Practices Bill 1974
- Introduced by: Kep Enderby
- First reading: 16 July 1974
- Second reading: 24 July 1974
- Third reading: 24 July 1974

Revising chamber: Senate
- Bill title: Trade Practices Bill 1974
- Member(s) in charge: Lionel Murphy
- First reading: 30 July 1974
- Second reading: 13–15 August 1974
- Third reading: 15 August 1974

Repeals
- Restrictive Trade Practices Act 1971; Restrictive Trade Practices Act 1972
- Status: In force

The Competition and Consumer Act 2010 (CCA) is an Act of the Parliament of Australia. Prior to 1 January 2011, it was known as the Trade Practices Act 1974 (TPA). The Act is the legislative vehicle for competition law in Australia, and seeks to promote competition, fair trading as well as providing protection for consumers. It is administered by the Australian Competition & Consumer Commission (ACCC) and also gives some rights for private action. Schedule 2 of the CCA sets out the Australian Consumer Law (ACL). The Federal Court of Australia has the jurisdiction to determine private and public complaints made in regard to contraventions of the Act.

== Application of Act ==
The Competition and Consumer Act (CCA) is an act of the Parliament of Australia and so its application is limited by section 51 of the Australian Constitution, which sets out the division of powers between the federal and state parliaments. As a result, most of the CCA is drafted to apply only to corporations, thus relying on Section 51(xx). Some parts of the CCA have a broader operation, relying for instance on the telecommunications power (Section 51(v)) or the territories power.

The Australian Consumer Law (ACL) is applied as state law through the Fair Trading Acts in each Australian State and Territory, to extend the application of the ACL to individuals. The Act exempts the Commonwealth, State and Territory governments from some provisions of the Act. The immunity from the Act does not generally derive to third parties who deal with the government: see Australian Competition and Consumer Commission v Baxter Healthcare. The article: 'Consumer Protection Law in Australia' (LexisNexis 2011) by Ven. Alex Bruce ('Tenpa') was the first Australian text to critically analyse the most extensive changes to consumer protection law embodied within the Competition and Consumer Act 2010.

== Provisions ==
=== Establishing Parts ===
The CCA establishes four organisations with a role in administering the Act:

- Part II establishes the Australian Competition & Consumer Commission (ACCC)
- Part IIA establishes the National Competition Council
- Part III establishes the Australian Competition Tribunal
- Part IIIAA establishes the Australian Energy Regulator

=== Part IIIA: Access to Services ===
Part IIIA of the CCA deals with third party access to services of facilities of national significance. For example, it covers access to electricity grids or natural gas pipelines. The aim of this part of the act is to encourage competition in upstream or downstream markets.

This part of the Act allows services to be 'declared' and for parties to negotiate terms and conditions of access. The National Competition Council and the ACCC are both involved in registering agreement and assessing what is fair (to owners, to public, to users). As an alternative to declaring a service, it may be subject to undertakings registered with the ACCC.

=== Part IV: Restrictive Trade Practices ===
The restrictive trade practices, or antitrust, provisions in the CCA are aimed at deterring practices by firms which are anti-competitive in that they restrict free competition. This part of the act is enforced by the Australian Competition & Consumer Commission (ACCC). The ACCC can litigate in the Federal Court of Australia, and seek pecuniary penalties of up to $10 million from corporations and $500,000 from individuals. Private actions for compensation may also be available.

These provisions prohibit:

- Most Price Agreements (see Cartel and Price-Fixing)
- Primary boycotts (an agreement between parties to exclude another)
- Secondary boycotts whose purpose is to cause substantially less competition (Actions between two persons engaging in conduct hindering 3rd person from supplying or acquiring goods or services from 4th)
- Misuse of market power – taking advantage of substantial market power in a particular market, for one or more proscribed purposes; namely, to eliminate or damage an actual or potential competitor, to prevent a person from entering a market, or to deter or prevent a person from engaging in competitive conduct.
- Exclusive dealing – an attempt to interfere with freedom of buyers to buy from other suppliers, such as agreeing to supply a product only if a retailer does not stock a competitor's product. Most forms of exclusive dealing are only prohibited if they have the purpose or likely effect of substantially lessening competition in a market.
- Third-line forcing: A type of exclusive dealing, third-line forcing involves the supply of goods or services on the condition that the acquirer also acquires goods or services from a third party. Third-line forcing is prohibited per se.
- Resale price maintenance – fixing a price below which resellers cannot sell or advertise
- Mergers and acquisitions that would result in a substantial lessening of competition

A priority of ACCC enforcement action in recent years has been cartels. The ACCC has in place an immunity policy, which grants immunity from prosecution to the first party in a cartel to provide information to the ACCC allowing it to prosecute. This policy recognises the difficulty in gaining information/evidence about price-fixing behaviours.

=== Part IVB: Industry Codes ===
Part IVB allows the Australian government to prescribe Industry Codes, and breach of these codes is a breach of the Act. The ACCC administers ongoing compliance with these codes. There are currently three codes made under this part:

- the franchising code
- the oil code, and
- the horticulture code.

=== Part VII: Authorisations, Notifications, and clearances in respect of restrictive trade practices ===
A unique feature of the Competition and Consumer Act, which does not exist in similar legislation overseas, is that the ACCC may grant exemptions. The ACCC may grant immunity based on assessment of the public benefits and anti-competitive detriments of the conduct, through the 'notification' or 'authorisation' process. Such exemptions do not apply to resale price maintenance or misuse of market power. The ACCC maintains a public register of authorisations and notifications.

In 2006 the Act was amended to include a new Division 3 to Part VIIA providing a process for formal clearance and authorisation of mergers.

=== Part VIIA: Prices surveillance, Notification, and Monitoring ===
Part VIIA enables the ACCC to examine the prices of selected goods and services in the Australian economy.

The ACCC's functions under this part are:

- To hold price inquiries in relation to the supply of goods or services, and to publicly report the findings to the responsible Commonwealth minister
- To examine proposed price rises on 'notified' goods, subject to instruction from the Minister. This allows some control over price rises
- To monitor the prices, costs and profits of an industry or business under the direction of the minister and to publicly report the results to the Minister.

Australia is a free market economy; consequently, the Act does not establish the ACCC as a price-fixing body. An example of the use of this section is that, under a direction from the Minister, the ACCC monitors the price of petrol. However, the ACCC cannot set the price of petrol, which has led to complaints that the ACCC is a "toothless watchdog".

=== Part IX: Review by Tribunal of determinations of commission ===
Part IX allows the Australian Competition Tribunal, established in Part III of the Act, to review certain decisions of the Australian Competition & Consumer Commission.

==== Part X: Liner shipping ====
Part X provides immunities for liner shipping from the competition provisions of the Act contained in Part IV. Upon registration of agreements with the registrar of liner shipping, shipping operators may discuss and fix prices, pool revenues and losses, coordinate schedules and engage in other conduct that would otherwise breach Part IV provisions.

=== Part XIB and Part XIC: Telecommunications Regulation ===
The Act also regulates aspects of the Telecommunications market. In Australia the previously government-owned Telstra, now privatised, has traditionally dominated the telecommunications sector. Telstra owns the copper network infrastructure.

The market was partially deregulated in 1992 with the introduction of Optus as a competitor. In 1997 deregulation continued when new entities were permitted to enter the market (see Communications in Australia). However, a feature of the Australian telecommunications market is that it is neither feasible nor efficient to have multiple networks, for example, of fibre-optic cables or of copper cables. For this reason, sections XIB and XIC of the Act exist to ensure that competitors (downstream users) have access to Telstra's networks.

Part XIB of the Act allows the ACCC to issue a Competition Notice to a carrier (telecommunications corporation) if it has reason to believe the corporation has engaged in "anti-competitive conduct". "Anti-competitive conduct" refers to the restrictive trade practices in Part IV of the Act (Sections 45, 45B, 46, 47 or 48), or when a carrier with a substantial degree of power in a telecommunications market has taken advantage of the power with the effect, or likely effect, of substantially lessening competition.

If the conduct continues after the issue of the Competition Notice, the ACCC can seek an injunction and financial penalty through the Federal Court. Competition Notices also allow third parties to take legal action.

Part XIC is a telecommunications-specific access regime. The object of Part XIC is to promote the long-term interests of end-users of telecommunications carriage services and services that facilitate the supply of such carriage services: s152AB. The extent to which something promotes the long-term interests of end-users is assessed by having regard to three, and only three, objectives, namely:

- promoting competition in markets for listed services;
- promoting any-to-any connectivity; and
- encouraging economically efficient use of, and investment in, the infrastructure by which listed services are supplied.

Under Part XIC, the ACCC can 'declare' particular telecommunications carriage services if it is in the long-term interests of end-users: s152AL. Suppliers of declared services must comply with standard access obligations: s152AR.

Persons can obtain access to declared services on terms and conditions set either:

- by agreement with the supplier of the declared service,
- by an ordinary access undertaking given by the supplier of the declared service, or
- through arbitration by the ACCC.

=== Schedule 2: Australian Consumer Law ===
The Australian Consumer Law (ACL) is based on the proposition that low consumer power or lack of information is a market failure which needs to be addressed by interference in the market.

These parts deal with:

- Unfair Practices (including unconscionable conduct, misleading or deceptive conduct and unfair contracts) - Chapter 2 and Part 3-1
- Conditions and Warranties in Consumer Transactions – Part 3-2
- Product safety and information - Part 3-3
- Product Liability - Part 3-5

==== Misleading or Deceptive Conduct ====
Misleading or deceptive conduct (s 18 of the ACL, formerly s 52 of the TPA) is one of the most important consumer parts of the act. It allows both individuals and the ACCC to take action against corporations who engage in conduct that is misleading or deceptive, or likely to mislead or deceive.

Misleading or deceptive conduct carried out by companies can also be prosecuted by the state (under Chapter 4 of the ACL).

==== Unconscionable Conduct ====
The inclusion of unconscionable conduct in the Australian Consumer Law is a codification and extension of the equitable principle of 'unconscionability' which was later clarified as a cause-of-action. The High Court of Australia held that an act was unconscionable if a party to a transaction is under a 'special disability', the other party is or ought be aware of that disability, and that other party acts in a way that makes it unfair or unconscionable to accept the offer of the weaker party.

Section 20 codifies the common law by referring to the "unwritten law" (i.e. the common law). However, the inclusion of section 20 allows for remedies under the Law.

Section 21 bans unconscionability in consumer transactions. Section 22 gives factors that indicate unconscionability. This clarifies the application of unconscionability and circumstances where a consumer is at a "special disability".

==== Other Unfair Practices ====
The Australian Consumer Law also prohibits a range of other unfair practices including bait advertising (advertising a product that is not reasonably available), pyramid schemes (Division 3 of Part 3-1 of the ACL, formerly Division 1AAA of Part IV of the TPA), and certain misrepresentations (e.g. a misrepresentation as to price).

==== Consumer Guarantees (Division 1 of Part 3-2) ====
The Australian Consumer Law implies into contracts with consumers certain guarantees (these were formerly known as warranties). Similar conditions are implied by the State Sale of Goods Acts, but these acts have slightly different jurisdictional limits (e.g. 'consumer' and 'goods') and the legislative phrases may have been interpreted slightly differently.

Under the Trade Practices Act implied conditions and warranties are mandatory: they cannot be excluded by a contractual intent to the contrary. The implied conditions are as to title (s 53 of the ACL, formerly s 69 of the TPA), quiet possession, freedom from encumbrances, fitness for purpose (s 55 of the ACL, formerly s 71 of the TPA), supply by description or sample (s 56, s 57) and that the goods are of acceptable quality (s 54 of the ACL, formerly s 66 of the TPA, which used the term "merchantable quality"). As a caveat, where the consumer guarantees are not that of title, undisturbed possession or undisclosed securities, they only apply if the goods or services in question are supplied in trade or commerce.

The most important of these to a consumer is likely to be acceptable quality. If goods or services fail to reach a basic level of quality (considering the price of the goods/services) – that is they are defective, break, or do not do what they should do – then the ACL has been breached.

=== The Dawson Report ===
The Review of the Competition Provisions of the Trade Practices Act (Dawson Report) was released in January 2003 and received 212 submissions. The scope of the report was quite broad, with recommendations regarding mergers and acquisitions, exclusionary provisions, third line forcing, joint ventures, penalties and remedies, and the functions and powers of the ACCC. As a result, some amendments have been made to the Act.

== See also ==
- Consumer Credit Act 2006
