= Australian Registered Scheme Number =

Australian Registered Scheme Number (ARSN) is a nine digit number issued to Australian managed investment schemes by Australian Securities and Investments Commission. The number is required to be printed on all material, and is similar to an Australian Business Number and Australian Company Number.
