= Storm Financial =

Australian financial advice company

Storm Financial Limited
- Type: Public
- Industry: Financial Services
- Founded: 23 May 1994; 32 years ago in Townsville, Queensland, Australia
- Founder: Emmanuel Cassimatis and Julie Cassimatis
- Defunct: 26 March 2009
- Fate: Liquidated
- Headquarters: Townsville, Queensland, Australia
- Area served: Australia
- Services: Financial advice
- Website: stormfinancial.com.au at the Wayback Machine (archived 2007-02-17); storm.asic.gov.au - Australian Securities & Investments Commission Page

Storm Financial Limited was a financial advice company, based in Townsville, Queensland, Australia. The company was founded by Emmanuel Cassimatis and his wife Julie Cassimatis as a private company initially with the name Cassimatis Securities Pty Ltd on 23 May 1994. As part of the company's expansion outside of Townsville the company changed its name from a personality based name to ozdaq Securities Pty Ltd on 10 April 2000. This name remained intact until 1 February 2004 when it was relinquished consequent to trademark objections from the Nasdaq stock exchange in the United States. The company then traded as Storm Financial Pty Ltd from 2 February 2004 until 14 June 2007 at which time the company became an unlisted public company and continued trading as Storm Financial Ltd from 15 June 2007 in preparation for making an initial public offering (IPO) in December 2007. This IPO was subject to a Storm Financial Prospectus which was dated 14 November 2007 and lodged with the Australian Securities & Investments Commission (ASIC) on the same date. Storm Financial Ltd continued to trade until external administrator Worrells Solvency and Forensic Accountants were appointed on 9 January 2009. The main creditor Commonwealth Bank appointed receivers and manager KordaMentha on 15 January 2009.

== Business ==
At the time of Storm Financial's proposed listing on 17 December 2007 Storm Financial had over 146 employees in 13 offices in Queensland, New South Wales and Victoria. Storm Financial was financial planning business which gave advice across the broad spectrum of financial products including advice on, but not limited to, investments, unit trusts, superannuation, life insurance and associated traditional and margin loans.

Storm had approximately 13,000 clients across Australia with $4.5 billion of funds and loans under advice (FLUA) as at June 2007. Of Storm's 13,000 clients, approximately 3,000 (23%) had some form of gearing associated with their portfolios and recommended by Storm.

A cornerstone of Storm's business model was to acquire and aggregate other financial planning businesses into a single conglomerate whose practices, quality control and the manufacturing mechanics of the advice was consistent.

In August 2008, Storm Financial's clients had A$4.8 billion invested in the Storm-branded index funds that were managed by Colonial First State and Challenger and other non-Storm-branded funds. By October 2008, that had dropped to A$3.5 billion, primarily as a result of falling share values. In August 2008, approximately 37 per cent of investments were being funded by margin lending. In October 2008 it had 13,000 clients.

== Client fees ==
In addition to gaining efficiencies by commoditising the packaging of its advice in Storm's back office, Storm Financial used its large flow of funds to obtain significant discounts in fees charged by financial product manufacturers such as fund managers and Margin Lenders. This enabled Storm to pass on significant savings to its clients, effectively allowing its clients to be charged wholesale prices for retail advice and retail products.

Storm offered two alternative fee options to its clients. The first fee option was a fee-for-service structure consisting of a relatively higher upfront fee and lower ongoing trail commission. The alternative option had a nil upfront fee component with higher ongoing trail commissions, similar to traditional financial advice models.

Storm's Statement of Advice indicated that, on average, the cost of the two fee options to the client converged after a period of approximately four and a half years. Before this period the nil upfront fee option with the higher trail commission favoured the client, whilst after this period the client was better off under the fee for service option with the fee advantage increasing exponentially over time.

The upfront and ongoing fees charged by Storm in both fee options were identified in general terms in Storm's Financial Services Guide ("FSG") as well as a more detailed breakdown with specific pricing in each individual client's statement of advice.

== History of ASIC & Storm to December 2007 ==
On 12 December 2008, after having discussions with the Commonwealth Bank, the Australian Securities & Investments Commission (ASIC) began investigations on Storm Financial's advice to its clients. From the early days of Storm Financial, ASIC played an integral role in monitoring and advising Storm on its activities. Storm was well known for its proactive approach to understanding and desiring to comply with Corporations Law.

1 October 1993 Storm queries the ASC re upcoming regulations

Evidence emerged from as early as 1 October 1993 when Storm's (then Emmanuel Cassimatis & Assoc Pty Ltd ) CEO and managing director Emmanuel Cassimatis demonstrated a diligent approach in complying with the upcoming Australian Securities Commission's (as ASIC was known at the time) regulations when he wrote to the ASC to express concern and receive clarification about pending regulatory changes. The ASC replied to these concerns with advice and copies of ASC practice notes relating to sections of Corporations Law.

8 October 1993 the ASC queries Storm on advice

On 8 October 1993 the ASC wrote to Storm requesting clarification about Storm's advice strategy as espoused by Storm's principal Emmanuel Cassimatis in a Townsville newspaper article. Storm responded to the ASC addressing the points raised which the ASC later acknowledged via a response letter and also advised that no further enquiries were necessary.

19 August 1994 Storm clarifies client fees with the ASC

Further evidence of diligence on the part of Storm came on 19 August 1994 when one of the directors of Storm (then Cassimatis Securities) sought clarification from the ASC about the treatment of fees and investment funds from clients. It was established and confirmed that Storm could continue collecting fees in its own name. It was further established that as long as unit buying funds were not taken into Storm's name then it could not be deemed that clients were investing in Storm. All Storm clients were therefore investing through Storm directly into various managed funds. Storm maintained this separation until it went into administration.

9 October 1995 routine ASC audit of Storm

Following an inspection and review by officers of the ASC on 9 October 1995, the ASC raised numerous matters requiring an explanation, in a letter dated 3 November 1995. Storm responded in a letter dated 17 January 1996 with detailed annexures replying in full and answering all matters of concern to the ASC. The Australian Securities Commission responded by a letter dated 15 February 1996 relevantly:

a) Expressing no dissatisfaction with Storm's response;

b) With no suggestion that Storm could improve the quality of its risk disclosure to its clients.

March 2005 routine ASIC audit of Storm

In or about March 2005, ASIC conducted an audit on Storm. Again, ASIC raised no substantial objection to Storm's advice to its clients, or any other aspect of its business.

November 2007 ASIC reviews Storm Education and Processes

On 6 November 2007, Storm lodged with ASIC a prospectus for its offer of 160 million shares to the public. The prospectus contained a detailed description of the Storm Business Model, and of the practices and procedures for the production of financial advice to clients. By an email dated 12 November 2007, ASIC notified Storm that three of its senior officers, namely:

a) Deborah Koromilas, Assistant Director, Financial Services Compliance;

b) Elizabeth Korpi, Lawyer, Capital Markets, Compliance;

c) Belisa Jong, Manager, Capital Markets, Compliance,

would visit Storm's Sydney office on 13 November 2007, and requested an explanation of Storm's advice model, including the client education process and documentation provided to clients and an explanation of how Storm's internal software system interacted with the services Storm provided to clients. In the course of the meeting, ASIC officers referred to Storm's prospectus and asked various questions including an explanation of the advice that Storm gave to its index fund clients. In response Storm presented and communicated to the officers from ASIC:

i) the substance of Storm's advice model;

ii) the substance of Storm's client education process;

iii) an explanation of how the Storm's internal software system interacted with the services Storm provided to clients;

iv) responses to all other matters about which they enquired; and

following the meeting on 13 November 2007, ASIC was satisfied that Storm's prospectus accurately set out the material elements of its business model. In addition, Ms Koromilas from ASIC, informed Storm that ASIC wished other advisors had procedures and processes that were as good as Storm's.

Summary

When the officers of ASC and ASIC conducted their reviews and audits they had complete access to all of the documents used by Storm in giving financial advice to clients, including practice and procedure manuals, advice templates, cash flow analyses, client financial profiles, Storm's Financial Services Guide and Statements of Advice. The ASC and ASIC often required individual client files to be ready in advance of their visits.

The ASC and ASIC thereby became familiar with all aspects of Storm's business relevant to the advice it was giving clients and the processes & procedures within Storm for the production of financial advice to clients, including advice templates, cash flow analyses and client financial profiles.

Neither the ASC nor ASIC informed Storm following any of their reviews or audits that the Storm model contravened or might contravene any of the financial services laws. All of the ASC's and ASIC's communications with Storm, following such reviews and audits, were to the effect that Storm's conduct was, in general, appropriate and lawful, subject only to minor matters.

== Collapse ==
The Commonwealth Bank forced Storm into administration on 9 January 2009 when the bank called up its lending facilities to Storm, citing a default on Storm's own margin lending facility with the bank. Whilst the date of the alleged default by Storm was 10 October 2008, the Commonwealth Bank records at the time showed Storm to not be in default. The banks acceptance of non-default was evidenced by the banks approval to Storm for a $30 million loan facility on 24 October 2008, the banks funding of a $10 million facility to Storm on 29 October 2008 and a new loan facility of $4.725 million on 5 December 2008 for the purchase of a new building.

Whilst in the past the Commonwealth Bank sent margin call notices out to Storm clients, the advisor or both, the bank's failure to issue margin call notices at the critical time was one of the major influences in late 2008 that triggered the eventual collapse of Storm. The banks failure to issue margin call notices together with its inability to reconcile the correct financial position of each client ultimately led to many clients passing through their margin call trigger points and ending in negative equity.

The unreliability and inaccuracy of the data provided to Storm and Storm clients by the Commonwealth Bank was identified in clause 24 of an evaluation conducted by the Roger Gyles QC on 18 November 2011. This evaluation further states that not only was the banks data inaccurate but that Commonwealth Bank officers knew of these inaccuracies. Separate analysis revealed the extent of the CBA data errors and how integral these errors were to the significant losses that Storm clients suffered.

On 8 December 2008, the Commonwealth Bank sent a letter to all of its Storm clients who found themselves in negative equity (according to CBA data which was faulty) as a consequence of falling markets and the banks failure to issue clients with a margin call notice. The lack of information meant that clients were unable to transact on their portfolios with confidence consequently resulting in significant losses. The CBA letter to Storm clients further incorrectly states that Storm was the sole manager of the clients margin loan throughout the period. On 24 December 2008 the Federal Court of Australia found that Storm had proved, to the requisite standard of proof for interlocutory injunction, that the CBA had engaged in conduct that was, in contravention to the Corporations Act 2001, misleading or deceptive or likely to mislead or deceive.

The Commonwealth Bank then issued a letter on 9 December 2008 to its Storm clients that were sold out of the market allegedly on the instructions of Storm's CEO, Emmanuel Cassimatis. This letter repeated elements of CBA's 8 December 2008 letter as well as alleging that Storm provided instruction to the bank that the CBA / Storm portfolios of all margin lending clients with an LVR greater than 90% be fully redeemed. Material elements of CBA's letter of 9 December 2008 was also found to be deceptive and misleading by the Federal Court of Australia.

On 17 December 2008, the Commonwealth Bank sent a generic letter to all its Storm clients further reinforcing the banks message of 8 and 9 December 2008 that Storm was the sole manager of the clients margin loan and further adding that Storm was "completely responsible for your [the clients] financial position…". Once again, the Federal Court of Australia found to the standard of proof for interlocutory injunction that the assertions by the Commonwealth Bank were deceptive and misleading. Unfavourable findings for the Commonwealth Bank were brought down on Wednesday 24 December 2008 by Justice Greenwood in the Federal Court in an interlocutory action brought about by Storm Financial.

Furthermore, following these unfavourable findings, the Commonwealth Bank on the next available business day after the Christmas break being Monday 29 December 2008 issued notices of demand to Storm Financial calling up Storm's entire commercial facilities. The ultimate consequence of the banks demands was to force Storm Financial into administration on 9 January 2009 'coincidentally' being the date that Justice Greenwood had set the matter down for mention for the purpose of setting a trial date with the Commonwealth Bank being the defendant. Storm being forced into administration by the Commonwealth Bank had the desirable outcome that the bank avoided trial.

On 12 December 2008, the Australian Securities & Investments Commission began investigation of Storm Financial's margin lending and related advice. Storm Financial was placed in administration in January 2009. The company had A$88 million in debts at the time.

The company was placed in liquidation by a Federal Court decision on 26 March 2009, putting asset recovery in the hands of liquidators Worrells Solvency and Forensic Accountants.

Investors in Storm Financial were expected to face large losses, possibly getting none of their funds back. Many of Storm Financial's clients were expected to face economic hardship; a survey of one group of 400 clients indicated two thirds would be unable to purchase a home after the forced sale of their existing house. The Commonwealth Bank held about 30 per cent of the loan business when it collapsed.

High-profile victims of the collapse include Australian cricketer Andrew Symonds, estimated to have lost approximately A$1.5 million in the company's failure. Former professional rugby league footballer Wally Fullerton Smith, an advisor working with Storm, lost his home and business.

== Inquiry ==
In 2009, the Parliamentary Joint Committee on Corporations and Financial Services conducted an inquiry into the collapse of Storm Financial and Opes Prime, as well as consideration of broader financial planning and governance issues. It released its report—Inquiry into Financial Products and Services in Australia—in November 2009. The report made 11 recommendations including increasing the powers of the regulator but did not recommend banning commissions. Storm Investors Consumer Action Group, which represents many of the victims of the company's collapse, blamed poor banking practices for the collapse and were disappointed that the inquiry did not bring bankers to task for their mismanagement.

== Government response ==
In April 2010, the Minister for Financial Services, Chris Bowen, announced the Government's response to the inquiry. He set out a range of reforms including, notably, going further than the Inquiry recommendations by banning commissions for financial planners giving advice on retail investment products including superannuation, managed investments and margin loans. Other reforms included instituting a statutory fiduciary duty so that financial advisers must act in the best interests of their clients, and increasing the powers of the corporate regulator; the Australian Securities & Investments Commission. The reforms were partially a response to the Joint Committee's Inquiry, but also reflected global concerns with financial governance following the 2008 financial crisis. The reforms are due to be fully implemented on 1 July 2012.

== Class-action lawsuits ==
In July 2010, Sydney-based lawyer Stewart Levitt of law firm Levitt Robinson filed a class-action lawsuit against the Commonwealth Bank of Australia alleging that, in its dealings with Storm Financial's investors, the bank's subsidiary Colonial First State was running an illegal unregistered Managed Investment Scheme and had engaged in misleading and deceptive trade conduct. This class action caused many complaints by clients of the law firm Levitt Robinson, since the bank had made the same offer three years prior with Levitt’s law firm believing to have charged $10 million in fees and disbursements.

This was followed by a series of other class actions on behalf of Storm Financial investors against several other Australian banks, including ANZ, Westpac, Bankwest, and most notably, Macquarie Bank—which, in March 2013, settled the lawsuit brought by investors advised by Storm Financial and who had Macquarie margin loan facilities for $82.5 million.

== See also ==
- Economy of Queensland
