= Business Names Registration Act 2011 =

Parliament of Australia
- Long title: An Act in relation to business names, and for related purposes
- Assented to: 3 November 2011
- Introduced by: Julia Gillard
- Status: In force

The Business Names Registration Act 2011 is Australian federal legislation that sets out the registration, renewal and cancellation of business names in Australia. All business structures that trade or deal under a name other than their legal entity name in Australia must apply for a business name.

The law was introduced when the responsibility to administer trading names registers was transferred from state and territory governments to the federal government to unify the state and territory governments' trading names registers into a national business names register. On 28 May 2012, all existing trading names registered with state and territory governments' trading names registers that complied with the law were automatically transferred to the national business names register. The Australian Securities and Investments Commission was appointed to establish and maintain the national business names register under the section 22(1). The purpose of the national business names register is stated under subsection 22(2): "The purpose of the [national] [b]usiness [n]ames [r]egister is to enable those who engage or propose to engage with a business carried on under a business name to identify the entity carrying on the business and how the entity may be contacted."

== Protections ==
Registering a business name does not provide to an applicant any exclusive rights over a business name or protection under intellectual property law.

== Availability requirements ==
In accordance with section 25, the rules for determining if a business name is available to an applicant are set out in the Business Names Registration (Availability of Names) Determination 2015. Additionally, an applicant whose proposed business name would ordinarily be refused under the rules is entitled to apply for ministerial consent to register the business name despite the rules if the minister, at their sole discretion, considers the request to be reasonable.
