= Superannuation Complaints Tribunal =

Body dealing superannuation complaints

- Successor: Australian Financial Complaints Authority (AFCA)
- Formation: 1993
- Dissolved: 31 October 2018
- Type: Ombudsman
- Location: Melbourne, Victoria, Australia
- Region served: Australia
- Members: Superannuation funds
- Chairperson: Helen Davis
- Affiliations: Australian Securities & Investments Commission
- Website: www.sct.gov.au

The Superannuation Complaints Tribunal was an Australian independent statutory body established by the Australian Government to deal with complaints about superannuation and certain life insurance annuities. It was superseded in 2018 by the Australian Financial Complaints Authority (AFCA).

== History ==
The Superannuation Complaints Tribunal was established under the Superannuation (Resolution of Complaints) Act in 1993. It was established at the same time as a new prudential and disclosure framework was put in place under the Superannuation Industry (Supervision) Act 1993, protecting employees compulsory superannuation contributions (introduced in 1992).

From 1 July 2018, the Australian Financial Complaints Authority (AFCA) replaced the Financial Ombudsman Service (FOS), the Superannuation Complaints Tribunal (SCT) and the Credit and Investments Ombudsman.

== Operation ==
Prior to being dissolved, in order for the Tribunal to deal with a complaint, a member (former member or potential beneficiary) of a superannuation fund had to first make a formal complaint to the Trustee of that fund (under the fund's own internal complaints procedures). If the complaint is not resolved to the member's satisfaction (or has not been dealt with within a 90-day period) then a complaint can be made to the Tribunal.

The Tribunal would only deal with complaints as they relate to a trustee decision affecting an individual member. The Tribunal could not deal with complaints about the fund as a whole (e.g. poor investment performance).

The Tribunal would first try and resolve the complaint through conciliation (where the SCT will facilitate a discussion with all parties involved). If conciliation was not successful, the Tribunal will make a "review" decision that was binding on all parties.

== See also ==
- Superannuation in Australia
- Australian Prudential Regulation Authority
- Australian Securities and Investments Commission
- Ombudsmen in Australia
