= MoneySmart =

Moneysmart is a project of the Australian Securities & Investments Commission (ASIC) that comprises a website, publications and education programs. It provides information, online tools and access to print publications. to help people make financial decisions, presented as "simple guidance you can trust".

== History ==
The Moneysmart website was officially launched on 15 March 2011, as part of the Australian Government's National Financial Literacy Strategy 2008–2010.

In July 2008, the Australian Government transferred the functions of the Financial Literacy Foundation to ASIC, including managing and maintaining the Understanding Money website. Moneysmart replaced two consumer websites that were previously maintained by ASIC: Understanding Money first launched in 2006, and FIDO. FIDO was launched by ASIC in 2000 and stood for "Financial Information Delivered Online".

The Moneysmart website was redesigned and relaunched on Wednesday 5 February 2020.

== Resources ==
The Moneysmart website covers a range of financial topics, including banking and budgeting, mortgage loans, credit and debt, fraud protection and identity theft, investing and planning, super and retirement insurance, and resources for teachers. It also may refer users to financial advisors for unique situations, and has around 25 tools and calculators that people can use to help them understand the issues they face and make better financial decisions. As well as the online calculators, there are mobile calculator applications for the Android OS and the Apple iPhone.

Moneysmart publishes a monthly e-newsletter called Moneysmart Tips, and has a social media presence on Facebook, Twitter and YouTube. Moneysmart is a key tool under the National Financial Capability Strategy 2018, to increase consumer education and help Australians achieve greater control of their finances.

== See also ==
- CBS MoneyWatch
