= Attorney-General (NSW) v Quin =

Judgement of the High Court of Australia

- Court: High Court of Australia
- Decided: 7 June 1990
- Citations: [1990] HCA 21, (1990) 170 CLR 1

Case history
- Prior actions: Macrae v Attorney General (NSW) (1987) 9 NSWLR 268; Quin v Attorney General (NSW) (1988) 28 IR 244
- Appealed from: NSW Court of Appeal

Case opinions
- Majority: Mason CJ, Brennan, & Dawson JJ
- Dissent: Deane & Toohey JJ

Attorney General (NSW) v Quin, is a landmark Australian judgment of the High Court. The matter related to Australian administrative law and to an extent the separation of powers.

== Background ==
The NSW Courts of Petty Sessions were abolished and replaced by Local Courts. 95 of the former magistrates were appointed to the new Local Courts, however six were not due to concerns about their fitness to be magistrates. (Note: The magistrates were Mr G J Macrae, Mrs M M Sleeman, Mr T M Weir, Mr L J Nash, Mr E A Quin and Mr Jones.) Five of the magistrates, (Note: Mr Jones was seriously ill and did not press for his appointment.) commenced proceedings in the Supreme Court of NSW seeking an order that they be appointed magistrates. They were unsuccessful at first, however the NSW Court of Appeal held that the decision of the Attorney-General not to recommend their appointment as Magistrates was void because it was made in such a way as to deny the applicants' legitimate expectations of procedural fairness. The Attorney-General's application for special leave to appeal was refused.

In 1988 there was a change of government and the new Attorney-General, John Dowd QC changed the selection policy to one where magistrates were to be selected entirely on merit and that required an assessment of competing applicants. None of the five were appointed. Mr Quin, Mr Nash and Mrs Sleeman commenced fresh proceedings, however Mr Nash & Mrs Sleeman subsequently decided to retire. Quin's challenge was on the basis that he had a real expectation to be reappointed which was founded in natural justice. An issue in the case was whether the doctrine of estoppel could prevent a government from changing that policy. The Court of Appeal made a declaration that Mr Quin was entitled to have his application considered without reference to other applicants. The Attorney-General obtained special leave to appeal to the High Court.

== Finding ==
The High Court of Australia found in favour of the Attorney-General, ruling that Courts were not able to overrule government policy as the appointment of magistrates is a role of the executive. Brennan J held that "Judicial review provides no remedies to protect interests, falling short of enforceable rights, which are apt to be affected by the lawful exercise of executive or administrative power" and that "Judicial review has undoubtedly been invoked ... to set aside administrative acts and decisions which are unjust or otherwise inappropriate, but only to the extent the purported exercise of power is excessive and or otherwise unlawful."

== Principle ==
The Executive cannot by representation or promise disable itself from performing a statutory duty; this includes the adoption of, or acting in accordance with, a new policy.

== See also ==
- Marbury v. Madison (1803) 1 Cranch 137, 177.
