= Julian Gardner (lawyer) =

Australian lawyer

Julian Gardner is a prominent Australian human right lawyer. He was a founding member, of the Fitzroy Legal Service. He served as the Public Advocate of the state of Victoria from 2000 to 2007 and the Director of the Victorian Legal Aid Commission from 1980 to 1989 and on numerous other public boards. In 2015, he was made a Member of the Order of Australia for services to the community.

== Biography ==
Gardner was born in England in 1945 and migrated with his family to Australia when he was 12. He attended University High School, and studied law and arts at the University of Melbourne.

In 1972, he became one of the founding members of the Fitzroy Legal Service, a free legal service based in Fitzroy, Victoria for people who cannot afford legal representation. Gardner was an associate partner at large firm when he started volunteering at the service. From 1975, Gardner became the service's first full time lawyer and legal coordinator. In that position, he expanded the service's lobbying. He queried legal aid rules and wrote the Law Institute about strictures about legal fees that hindered accessibility. /> In 1977, the service produced the first version of its popular Legal Resources Book, compiled by Gardner together with Peter Cashman and David Neal.

Gardner served as the first Director of the Victorian Legal Aid Commission from 1980 to 1989, and as the first Chairperson of the Victorian WorkCare Appeals Board from 1989 to 1992. He was the National Convenor of the Social Security Appeals Tribunal from 1994 to 1997 and the President of the Mental Health Review Board from 1997 to 2000.

In February 2000, he became the third Public Advocate of the state of Victoria. The role of the advocate is to protect the legal rights of Victorians over 18 years old with disabilities, often by intervening in court actions, holding and exercising legal guardianship over persons lacking decision making capacity, and/or petitioning other government agencies on behalf of disabled persons. In 2003 he took action in the Victorian Supreme Court that resulted in the landmark decision about the lawfulness of the removal of medical treatment in the form of artificial nutrition and hydration. (Re BWV; Ex parte Gardner 7 VR 487) In 2005, he made the high-profile decision to allow the use to be discontinued of Maria Korp's feeding tube, which ultimately resulted in her death. His seven-year term ended in April 2007.

From 1993 to 2000 he chaired the Council of International House, a residential college of Melbourne University.

Subsequently, Gardner conducted a review of the Victorian Equal Opportunity Act resulting in significant reforms. He served as the Deputy Chair of Alfred Health from 2010 to 19, Chair of Mind Australia Ltd from 2011 to 18, and Vice Chair of the Australian Press Council from 2012 to 2013. His experience in promoting the rights of people at the end of life led to his appointment as a member of the Ministerial Advisory Panel for Voluntary Assisted Dying 2017-18 which made recommendations to government on the historic legislation. Later he was the Chair of Voluntary Assisted Dying Implementation Taskforce 2018-19 and Chairperson of the VAD Review Board from 2022 to 2025.

In 2015, Gardner was made a member of the Order of Australia for "significant service to the community through leadership roles with social welfare, mental health, legal aid and other legal organisations".

== Writing ==
- Gardner, Julian. 1982. "Legal Aid Helps Make the Law Accessible." The Age, 8 November 1982, The Law and You (sponsored supplement), 1.
