= Energy & Water Ombudsman =

The Energy & Water Ombudsman NSW (EWON) is the approved dispute resolution scheme for all electricity and gas customers in New South Wales, Australia, and some water customers.

EWON is an industry-based ombudsman scheme, which means it is funded by its members. As with other Ombudsmen in Australia and around the world, EWON's service is free for consumers.

EWON models and evaluates its service against the six industry-standard benchmarks for complaint-handling agencies:

- Accessibility
- Independence
- Fairness
- Accountability
- Efficiency
- Effectiveness

In line with the benchmarks, EWON's decision-making process is independent. EWON is not a consumer advocate and does not represent industry. EWON works towards a fair and reasonable outcome for the parties involved in a dispute.

== Ombudsman ==
Janine Young was appointed the Energy and Water Ombudsman for NSW in November 2014. She was formerly the Public Transport Ombudsman (Victoria) and the Deputy Ombudsman at the Energy and Water Ombudsman Victoria (EWOV).

Janine was appointed Chair of the Australian and New Zealand Ombudsman Association (ANZOA) in November 2019.

== See also ==
- Ombudsmen in Australia
