= Australian Maritime Defence Council =

The Australian Maritime Defence Council is a policy and stakeholder advisory body in the defence portfolio of the Government of Australia. It was established on 25 February 1982 as the Australian Shipping and Defence Council. As of 2015, the council has 18 members which are appointed by the Minister for Defence. The Council provides "a forum in which senior Defence and industry stakeholders can exchange information on trends and matters of national maritime interest" and the Deputy Chief of the Navy is its Chair.

== Membership ==
The council's initial membership was limited to the Royal Australian Navy, representatives from the Department of Defence (movements and transport), the Royal Australian Air Force (RAAF) and shipowners. Early industrial members included the Australian National Line, BHP, Ampol Petroleum, Howard Smith Industries and TNT Bulkships. The Australian Ship Repairers Group became a member in 2002, Border Protection Command joined in 2006, and the Maritime Union of Australia joined in 2009. The Department of Foreign Affairs & Trade and the RAAF resigned from the Council in 2008.
