= Katy Barnett =

Australian legal academic and author

Katy Barnett is an Australian academic and author. She joined Melbourne Law School in 2006 as a sessional lecturer and was permanently appointed a Professor of Law in 2010.

Her expertise is in private law, with particular expertise on the law of remedies, contract, equity, legal history, as well as animal law.

She has been described as 'one of the most eminent authors and commentators' in the field of remedies and private law. Her work has been referred to by jurists such as Australia's (then) Chief Justice Robert French. In addition to her writing on private law, she has been cited for her academic work analysing disparities between male and female academics in citation metrics, especially regarding the metric of apex court citations.

== Early life and education ==
Katy completed an LLB with Honours and a BA with majors in English, History, and Medieval Studies at the University of Melbourne in 1999.

Before her academic career, she worked as a research assistant at the Court of Appeal at the Victorian Supreme Court and was an associate to Justice Mandie. In private practice she worked at both Freehills and Russell Kennedy.

== Academic career ==
In 2006 Katy joined Melbourne Law School as a lecturer and was appointed permanently in 2010. In 2013 she served as a visiting scholar at Brasenose College, Oxford.

Her scholarship has been cited by apex courts such as the Supreme Court of Canada.

In 2022 she co-authored a book on Animal Law with another University of Melbourne professor Jeremy Gans.

In 2022 she was appointed editor of the Indian Law Review.

== Non-academic writing ==
In addition to her academic writing, she has contributed articles to Quilette, and Times Higher Education.

== Bibliography ==
=== Academic works ===
- Accounting for Profit for Breach of Contract: Theory and Practice (Bloomsbury Publishing, 2012)
- Guilty Pigs: The Weird and Wonderful History of Animal Law (Black Ink Books, 2022)
- Remedies Cases and Materials in Australian Private Law (Cambridge University Press, 2023)
- Remedies in Australian Private Law (Cambridge University Press, 2018)
- Research Handbook on Remedies in Private Law (Edward Elgar Publishing, 2019) (Contributor)

=== Fiction ===
- The Earth Below (Ligature, 2019)
