= National Competition Council =

Australian regulatory body

The National Competition Council (NCC) is an Australian research and advisory body, legislated by Part IIA of the Competition and Consumer Act 2010.

The NCC was originally established in 1995 by the Council of Australian Governments. Funded by the Commonwealth, the NCC is a national body responsible to all Australian governments. The NCC is composed of councilors drawn from different business sectors and areas of Australia.

== Role ==
The primary function of the NCC is to recommend and provide advice on the regulation of access to services provided by third parties provided by infrastructure that is monopoly in nature, such as roads, gas pipelines, and railways. Section 29B of the Competition and Consumer Act 2010 sets out its powers and functions.

The NCC has several specific functions including:

- Assessing progress of Government in implementing competition reform
- Undertaking projects as requested by Government such as reviews and advice regarding restrictive or anti-competitive legislation, reform of public monopolies, price oversight, and competitive neutrality.
- Educating the community and communicating reform

== Structure ==
The NCC is composed of an executive director, President, and up to four councilors on a part-time basis. There is a process for appointing councillors, conducting meetings, and disclosing interests by councillors.

As of 2022 the NCC is organised as follows:

=== Executive Director ===
- Richard York

=== President ===
- Julie-Anne Schafer

=== Councillors ===
- Martin Wallace
- Katrina Groshinski
- Michael Borsky
