= Australian Competition Tribunal =

Australian review body

The Australian Competition Tribunal is an independent statutory review body, legislated by part III of the Competition and Consumer Act 2010. The Tribunal was originally established under the Trade Practices Act 1965 (Cth). Its members consist of judges drawn from the Federal Court of Australia. The Tribunal reviews merger authorisation determinations made by the Australian Competition and Consumer Commission (ACCC).

== Role ==
Mergers and acquisitions are an important aspect of economies. The primary function of the Tribunal is to hear applications for the review of determinations made by the ACCC, and is empowered to:

- review the grant or refusal by the ACCC in granting or refusing authorisation for a company merger or acquisition
- perform the functions and powers of the ACCC in conducting such a review.
