= Credit and Investments Ombudsman =

Credit and Investments Ombudsman Limited
- Company type: Non Profit
- Industry: Ombudsman Service
- Founded: June 18, 2003 Sydney, Australia
- Founder: Mortgage and Finance Association of Australia (MFAA)
- Defunct: October 31, 2018
- Fate: Superseded
- Successor: Australian Financial Complaints Authority (AFCA)
- Headquarters: Sydney, Australia
- Key people: Mark Scanlon (Chairman), Raj Venga (Ombudsman and CEO)
- Members: 22,000 (2016)
- Number of employees: 50 (2016)
- Website: cio.org.au (defunct)

The Credit and Investments Ombudsman (CIO) (until 2014 known as the Credit Ombudsman Service) was an Australian alternative dispute resolution or ombudsman that helped settle disputes between consumers and financial credit providers. The organisation was replaced with the Australian Financial Complaints Authority (AFCA) in 2018.

== History ==
The Credit and Investments Ombudsman was first established as the Mortgage Industry Ombudsman Service Limited (MIOS) on 18 June 2003 as an EDR (External Dispute Resolution, known in other regions as Alternative dispute resolution (ADR)) scheme.

It was established in 2003 as a result of the Mortgage & Finance Association of Australia ('MFAA') self-regulation, originally called the Mortgage Industry Ombudsman Scheme (MIOS). It later expanded its remit to include non-bank lending and other credit services, changing its name to the Credit Ombudsman Service Limited (COSL) in 2004 to reflect this broader jurisdiction. In November 2014 the scheme name was changed to the Credit and Investments Ombudsman.

CIO was an approved EDR scheme under scheme approved by ASIC's Regulatory Guide RG 139 and its services were free for consumers. Funding was sourced from a combination of its membership fees and complaint fees paid by its participating Members. CIO could award compensation up to a maximum of $309,000 and other remedies, such as an apology, could be required.

On 1 November 2018, the Australian Financial Complaints Authority (AFCA) launched as the one ombudsman service for all financial complaints, replacing the Credit and Investment Ombudsman and two other predecessor schemes, the Financial Ombudsman Service and the Superannuation Complaints Tribunal.

== Complaints ==
=== Consideration ===
CIO considered complaints or disputes about its participating Members' concerning their products and services, such as mortgages, credit products, financial planning, managed investment, insurance and deposit taking (savings).

CIO resolves disputes in a non-adjudicative means through conciliation, although the actual Ombudsman could make a decision which was binding on the member (a Determination). Like all ASIC RG 139 approved schemes, Determinations could be made by the Ombudsman to bind Members but not complainants.

CIO's conciliation process was both inquisitorial and consensus-based and focused on producing a mutually satisfactory outcome. Both Members and consumers were afforded an equal opportunity to put forward their cases. This was intended to ensure procedural fairness and promote effective dispute resolution.

=== Coverage ===
The Credit and Investments Ombudsman covered complaints for consumers if they have dealt with a participating Member of CIO as:

- a borrower or prospective borrower
- a loan guarantor or prospective guarantor
- or have in any way sought the services of a Member in the ordinary course of their business in the credit marketplace.

=== Cost ===
There was no fee for individuals or small businesses when making a complaint all costs were covered by the scheme members.

== See also ==
- Ombudsman
- Financial Ombudsman Service (Australia)
