= Mediation in Australia =

Cultural role of conflict resolution form

Mediation in Australia, as a form of mediation, involves understanding the role that culture plays in the multi-cultural society of Australia. Cultural differences often exist due to race and ethnicity, but can also arise from religion, gender, age, sexual orientation and disabilities. Major concerns in cross-cultural dispute resolution include perceived power imbalance—often escalated by communication difficulties, misconceptions, negotiation behaviour, face-saving and the publicity surrounding the dispute.

== Native title mediation ==
Native title in Australia has frequently given rise to mediation. If a mediator lacks cultural literacy across different cultures or awareness of parties having difficulties during the mediation due to differences in culture, then the mediator's lack of understanding or misunderstanding could cause a breakdown in the negotiation-process. Cultural awareness ensures that mediators can adapt their skills and techniques to ensure that they can maintain their standard of care throughout the mediation process.

Native-title mediation differs from regular mediation in that, rather than the parties referring a dispute to mediation, the Federal Court of Australia can also determine whether the National Native Title Tribunal should mediate a matter. Other distinctive features occur: often native-title mediations can involve up to one hundred participants; lawyers play a minimal role; and rather than making technical legal points the speakers for the Aboriginal and Torres Strait Islands people often talk about their family genealogies, traditions, dreaming and stories to support their claims.

The National Native Title Tribunal does not decide whether native title exists over land in question: rather it has the role of mediating contested applications and applications for compensation which originated in the Federal Court of Australia. More importantly, the parties must mandatorily attend a native-title mediation unless the court has granted leave. However, the parties can apply for the termination of the mediation at any time later than three months after the commencement of the mediation.

Due to the large number of applicants in native-title applications, the process of mediation differs somewhat from that of other mediations. The National Native Title Tribunal takes a more "outcome-focused" approach. In the course of a number of pre-mediation meetings the mediator obtains information from the parties in relation to the claim itself and tries to obtain information from the parties regarding their interests in the claim and any other matters which may have relevance to the mediation.

== Mediation clauses and the mediation process ==
Mediation clauses aim to ensure that if a conflict arises the parties will settle it amicably and fairly by triggering the requirement for the parties to use the mediation process (as opposed to the court system). As more Australian companies realise the benefits of settling commercial disputes out-of-court, many companies now include compulsory mediation clauses in their contracts. Such benefits include avoiding negative publicity that can often entail following a trial, reduced legal fees and less time spent by management with lawyers.

Contracts which could include mediation clauses include franchise agreements, commercial contracts, building and construction agreements, finance and lease agreements and joint ventures. Standard mediation clauses appear on the websites of professional associations and of mediation agencies; however mediators may draft some clauses to suit specific circumstances, for example if the parties reside in different countries.

Standard mediation clauses generally provide—in the event of a dispute—for the referral of the matter to a mediator, and make it subject to the rules of mediation. Further, standard clauses will often specify an alternative if the parties fail to reach agreement within a specified time. Most importantly, such clauses allow for the continuation of the contract notwithstanding the current dispute.

Note that the Australian courts, in recent times, have declared a number of mediation clauses void due to poor drafting. The reasons the courts have cited for declaring the mediation clauses void include, for example:

- whether the clause survives the termination of the agreement
- a sufficiently certain clause
- whether the parties agreed to mediate in good faith
- in complete mediation

Mediators may therefore obtain legal advice when drafting such clauses to ensure their enforceability.

In Australia, once parties have decided to participate in a mediation, the majority of mediators will require them to sign a document commonly known as an "agreement to mediate". Agreements to mediate represent an important step in the mediation process because parties participating in mediation often have different views and expectations in relation to the mediation process, the mediator's role and the parties' role.

"Agreements to mediate" include clauses in relation to:

- the appointment of the mediator
- the mediator's role
- the scope and conduct of the mediation
- conflicts of interest
- the roles of the parties
- confidentiality and privilege
- the mediator's fees
- liability and indemnity
- authority to settle
- termination of the mediation
- settlement of the dispute
- enforcement of any settlement-agreement reached

Importantly, agreements to mediate provide both the mediator and the parties to the mediation with a contract which, if breached, will give rise to remedies for breach of contract.

Many Australian government agencies, professional and industry-bodies and mediation-agencies provide pro-forma agreements to mediate on their web-sites. The mediator should ensure that the parties understand the terms of the agreement before executing it. Mediators should also give the parties an opportunity to ask questions and suggest changes. Once the parties express themselves content with the agreement to mediate, the mediator should arrange for its signing and dating prior to the commencement of the mediation.
