= Veterans' Review Board =

The Veterans' Review Board (VRB) is a statutory body within the Australian Government's Veterans' Affairs portfolio. The role of the VRB is to conduct merits review of certain decisions under the Veteran's Entitlement Act 1986 (Cth) (the VEA) and the Military Rehabilitation and Compensation Act 2004 (Cth) (the MRCA). The objective of the Board is to provide a mechanism of review that is fair, just, economical and quick.<s133A VEA>

The VRB is not a court, but a specialist, high volume, merits review tribunal. Merits review means the VRB makes a fresh decision that it considers is the correct or preferable decision in all of the circumstances. In doing so, the VRB exercises the same statutory powers, and is subject to the same limitations as the original decision-maker whose decision it is reviewing.

== New material ==
As the VRB makes a fresh decision, it is not limited to the material that was before the original decision maker. The VRB may consider any additional material or information that becomes available subsequent to the original decision and any material that may become available during a hearing, including any evidence given by the veteran or others called to give evidence. The Board is not bound by technicalities, legal forms or rules of evidence. It must act according to substantial justice and the merits of the case.

== Decision correcting ==
In making its decision, the VRB may affirm the original decision, vary the decision in some of its detail, set the original decision aside and substitute the decision of the Board in its place, or adjourn the hearing and seek further information to assist the Board to come to the correct or preferable decision. The Board also has the power to remit a matter back to the Repatriation Commission or the Military Rehabilitation and Compensation Commission for further consideration <s138A VEA>

== Review details ==
Reviews are conducted in the form of a private hearing before a three-member panel, consisting of a senior member who is generally legally qualified, a services member and a member. Services members are appointed from those nominated by ex-service organisations and generally have extensive military service experience, including operational service. Applicants appearing before the Board are generally represented by lay advocates who are experienced in the jurisdiction. Representation by legal practitioners or legally qualified persons is prohibited by the VEA. While there is a right of appearance for the Repatriation Commission or the Military Rehabilitation and Compensation Commission, the practice is they do not appear. The Board is provided with all relevant material relied upon by the original decision maker. Additional evidence may be produced or called at the hearing. It is not usual for expert witnesses to be called to give oral evidence. Instead the Board relies upon written reports.

Additional case management and Alternate Dispute Resolution powers were provided to the Board in the Veterans'Affairs Legislation Amendment (Mental Health and Other Measures ) Act 2014. The Board commenced a trial of alternate dispute resolution 'ADR' in Sydney for new matters received from 1 Jan 15. The trial of ADR was found in an independent review conducted by Stephen Skeehill to be an 'outstanding success' with close to 60% of matters that went through ADR being finalized within 2 months as compared to the more traditional VRB processes where the average was about 1 year. As a result, ADR will be progressively rolled out to all new applications received, commencing with Victoria and Tasmania with effect 1 October 2016. Other states will follow as resources allow.

The Board does not generally give oral decisions at the end of the hearing, rather it reduces its decision and reasons to writing which are then sent to the applicant. Oral reasons may be provided where the decision is favourable to the applicant <s140(2)of the VEA>

Applicant's may request, prior to a formal Board hearing that the matter be referred for a case appraisal or a neutral evaluation. If this occurs, and a view favourable to the applicant is made, a decision will issue without the need for a hearing. As from September 2014, the Board has commenced to hold directions hearings. These are held where there is a need to clarify issues, seek preliminary orders by the Board or to consider dismissing a matter where the applicant has failed to either comply with a previous Board direction <s155(8)(b) of the VEA> or the application has failed to proceed within a reasonable time <s155(8)(a)>

== Appeals from the Board to the Administrative Appeals Tribunal ==
There is a further right of appeal from decisions of the Board to the Administrative Appeals Tribunal, with a further right of appeal on a point of law to the Federal Court of Australia.

== Board details ==
In 2011–12 the Board received 3338 new applications, decided 3328 matters and had 2888 applications on hand as of 30 June 2012. 43.3% of matters were set aside and 47.4% of matters affirmed. The average time taken to complete a matter from lodgement to decision was 51 weeks The Board had 36 members, 25 staff and a budget of $5.752M in 2011-12. In 2012-13 the Board received 3305 new applications, decided 3430 matters and had 2851 matters on hand as at 30 June 2013. 47.5% of matters were set aside and 52.5% of matters affirmed. The average time taken to complete a matter from lodgement to completion was 52 weeks. In 2013-14 the Board received 3264 new applications and finalised 3388 applications. The average time taken to finalise was 50 weeks. As at 30 June 2014, the Board had 36 members, 22.2 staff and a budget of $5.65m in 2013-14. In 2014-15, the Board received 2707 new applications, finalized 3066 matters and had 2507 matters on hand as at 30 June 2015. 41.1% of matters finalized were set aside. In 2015-16, the Board received 2804 applications, finalized 2929 applications and had 2378 matters on hand. 48.7% of matters were set aside and 51.3% affirmed The average time taken to finalize a matter was 51 weeks. As a result of ADR, only 1706 hearings were held. The Board had 43 members and 25 staff as at 30 June 2016 and a budget of $5.64m for the 2015-16 financial year.

The Board has registries in Sydney, Brisbane, and Melbourne. The Board sits in all state capital cities and some regional centres on a regular basis.
