= Whistleblower protection in Australia =

Whistleblower protection in Australia is offered for certain disclosures under a patchwork of laws at both federal and state level. Eligibility for protection depends on the requirements of the applicable law and the subject matter of the disclosure. Not all disclosures are protected by law in Australia. At federal level, whistleblowers face potential imprisonment for making disclosures about certain subjects, including national security and immigration matters.

Australia's first whistleblower protection laws were introduced in Queensland following the recommendations of the Fitzgerald Inquiry. Laws have subsequently been introduced in other states and territories, culminating with the adoption of federal legislation with the passage of the Public Interest Disclosure Act 2013.

Australia has made significant strides in the area of whistleblower protection for the private sector, with new legislation to amend the Corporations Act. The Treasury Laws Amendment (Enhancing Whistleblower Protections) Act 2019 passed in December 2018. From 1 July 2019, the whistleblower protections in the Corporations Act have been expanded to provide greater protections for whistleblowers. This will include requiring public companies, large proprietary companies, and corporate trustees of APRA-regulated superannuation entities to have a whistleblower policy from 1 January 2020.

86% of Australians support stronger legal protections for Australian whistleblowers, with over half (52%) expressing strong support for these protections.

For the first time, private-sector whistleblowers now have greater protection than their public-sector counterparts.

== Federal law ==
=== General provisions ===
The Public Interest Disclosure Act 2013 (PID Act) introduced a new comprehensive framework for protecting Commonwealth public sector whistleblowers. The PID Act is the legislation underpinning the Commonwealth Government's Public Interest Disclosure (PID) Scheme to encourage public officials to report suspected wrongdoing in the Australian public sector. The PID Act arose in response to the report on Whistleblower Protection: a comprehensive scheme for the Commonwealth public sector by the House of Representatives Standing Committee on Legal and Constitutional Affairs. During the Committee's Inquiry it was recognised that whistleblowers play an important role in ensuring accountability. As a result, those making disclosures needed to be protected from retribution.

The PID Act offers protection to 'whistleblowers' from reprisal action. The protection applies to public officials who disclose suspected illegal conduct, corruption, maladministration, abuses of public trust, deception relating to scientific research, wastage of public money, unreasonable danger to health or safety, danger to the environment or abuse of position or conduct which may be grounds for disciplinary action.

The Commonwealth Ombudsman has a significant role supporting and monitoring the administration of the whistleblower scheme established under the PID Act. The Commonwealth Ombudsman is responsible for promoting awareness and understanding of the PID Act as well as providing guidance, information and resources about making, managing and responding to disclosures.

The unauthorised disclosure of Commonwealth information is a federal crime under section 70 of the Crimes Act 1914 that carries a penalty of two years' imprisonment. The provision is often used to pursue whistleblowers and leaks by federal government employees and private contractors. Since the Abbott government took office, federal agencies have referred journalists from The Guardian Australia, news.com.au and The West Australian using this provision in a bid to uncover the sources for immigration stories.

However, as of 2017, it was noted that whistleblower protections "had little practical effect in either the public or private sectors".

=== National security ===
The National Security Amendment Act (No 1) 2014 (Cth) amended the legislation governing ASIO to criminalise the disclosure of any information relating to a "Special Intelligence Operation". The Guardian noted that any act committed by ASIO could be declared a Special Intelligence Operation with the Attorney-General's approval and removed from scrutiny.

=== Immigration law ===
Section 42 of the Australian Border Force Act 2015 (Cth) imposes a penalty of two years' imprisonment for a whistleblower who makes a disclosure in relation to an Australian immigration detention facility, although section 42(2)(c) exempts a disclosure where it is "required or authorised by or under a law of the Commonwealth, a State or a Territory".

The Conversation considered whether the section 42(2)(c) exemption would apply so that a whistleblower could rely on the protections of Public Interest Disclosure Act 2013 (Cth). It found that the exemption might indeed apply, but would do so subject to several qualifications, such as:

- the whistleblower would first need to report their concerns internally
- an external disclosure could only then be made after the whistleblower believed on reasonable grounds that the either the investigation or response were inadequate or delayed
- the disclosure must not be contrary to the public interest nor make public sensitive information about law enforcement
- the disclosure cannot be made about a matter in which a Minister has taken action or proposes to take action.

Section 42 of the Australian Border Force Act 2015 (Cth) has been criticised by the Australian Lawyers Alliance for its potential chilling effect on whistleblowers and journalists.

Medical professionals who have worked at Nauru are launching a High Court challenge against the secrecy provisions of the Australian Border Force Act 2015.

=== Private sector ===
Transparency International Australia considers the protections for private sector whistleblowers to be weaker than for those in the public sector, with the main provisions found in corporations legislation that does not mandate any internal company procedures.

Part 9.4AAA of the Corporations Act provides a degree of protection.

== State and territory laws ==
Apart from South Australia (but see below), the state and territory whistleblower protection laws only cover the public sector.

Victoria has apparently enacted some whistleblower protections that go beyond the public sector. See the article cited in the footnote.

=== Queensland ===
Protection is currently offered by the Public Interest Disclosure Act 2010 (Qld).

=== New South Wales ===
Protection is currently offered by the Protected Disclosures Act 1994 (NSW).

=== Australian Capital Territory ===
Protection is currently offered by the Public Interest Disclosure Act 2012 (ACT).

=== Victoria ===
Protection is currently offered by the Public Interest Disclosures Act 2012 (Vic).

=== Tasmania ===
Protection is currently offered by the Public Interest Disclosures Act 2002 (Tas).

=== South Australia ===
Protection is currently offered by the Public Interest Disclosure Act 2018 (SA).

=== Western Australia ===
Protection is currently offered by the Public Interest Disclosure Act 2003 (WA).

=== Northern Territory ===
Protection is currently offered by the Public Interest Disclosure Act 2008 (NT).

== See also ==
- Comcare v Banerji
- David McBride (whistleblower), former Australian Army lawyer who exposed war crimes in Afghanistan
- Fusion Party (Australia)
- Richard Boyle (whistleblower), a whistleblower at the ATO
- WikiLeaks Party
