= Garry Downes =

Australian judge (b.1944)

The Honourable Garry Keith Downes AM KC
- Born: 7 January 1944 (age 82); Sydney Australia
- Education: Newington College; University of Sydney Law School
- Occupations: Retired judge, Federal Court of Australia; Former President of the Administrative Appeals Tribunal
- Spouse: Brenda (nee Davis)
- Children: 3 daughters
- Parent: Mr F K Downes

Garry Keith Downes AM KC (born 7 January 1944) is a former judge of the Federal Court of Australia and former President of the Administrative Appeals Tribunal.

== Education ==
Downes attended Newington College (1956-1960) and graduated from the University of Sydney Law School in 1967. His first job was as associate to then Chief Justice of Australia, Sir Garfield Barwick.

== Legal career ==
Downes was called to the Australian Bar in 1970 and appointed Queen's Counsel in 1983. He was also a member of the English Bar. His practice was concentrated on commercial law, administrative law, and international arbitration.

Downes was Chairman of the Federal Litigation Section of the Law Council of Australia and Chairman of its Administrative Law Committee. He has served international and national organisations in various capacities, including as President of the Union Internationale des Avocats, Founder and Patron of the Anglo-Australasian Lawyers' Society, Chairman of the Chartered Institute of Arbitrators Australia, Member of the International Court of Arbitration of the International Chamber of Commerce, Member of the Council of the NSW Bar Association and Chairman of the NSW Council of Law Reporting.

Downes was appointed judge of the Federal Court of Australia and President of the Administrative Appeals Tribunal in 2002. He is the immediate past Chair of the Council of Australasian Tribunals (COAT) and a past member of the Council of the Australian Institute of Judicial Administration (AIJA).

In November 2007 he assumed, with Chief Justice Michael Black of the Federal Court, co-presidency of the International Association of Supreme Administrative Jurisdictions (IASAJ).

On 15 May 2012, Downes retired from the Bench.

In February 2014, Downes was retained by the Australian Sports Anti-Doping Authority (ASADA) to review its investigation into supplements use at Australian Football League (AFL) club Essendon and National Rugby League (NRL) club the Cronulla-Sutherland Sharks.

== Honours ==
In the 1997 Australia Day Honours Downes became a Member of the Order of Australia (AM) "In recognition of service to the law as a barrister, educator and Executive Officer of many legal organisations, including President of the International Association of Lawyers".
