= Refugee Review Tribunal =

Australian administrative body (1993–2015)

The Refugee Review Tribunal was an Australian administrative law tribunal established in 1993. Along with the Migration Review Tribunal, the Refugee Review Tribunal was amalgamated to a division of the Administrative Appeals Tribunal on 1 July 2015.
