= Migration Review Tribunal =

The Migration Review Tribunal was an Australian administrative law tribunal established in 1989.

Along with the Refugee Review Tribunal, the Migration Review Tribunal was amalgamated to a division of the Administrative Appeals Tribunal on 1 July 2015.
