= Social Security Appeals Tribunal =

Agency overview
- Formed: 1975
- Dissolved: 1 July 2015
- Jurisdiction: Australia

The Social Security Appeals Tribunal (SSAT) was an Australian quasi-judicial tribunal established in 1975 and made a division of the Administrative Appeals Tribunal in July 2015.

The SSAT was established on 10 February 1975 to review decisions made under the Social Services Act 1947. Its predecessor were various state-based bodies. Initially the SSAT was limited to making recommendations without any legal effect about decisions under the Social Services Act. In 1988, its decisions were made legally enforceable when changes to the Social Services Act established it as a statutory authority.

The kind of decisions it could review was increased in 2007 to include decisions made by the then Child Support Agency.
