= Australian Securities and Investments Commission =

Corporate regulation agency of the Australian Government

Commission overview
- Formed: 1 July 1998
- Preceding agencies: National Companies and Securities Commission; Corporate Affairs offices in the states and territories
- Dissolved: Australian Securities Commission
- Jurisdiction: Australia
- Headquarters: Sydney, New South Wales
- Employees: 1,656 (2018–19)
- Minister responsible: Jim Chalmers, Treasurer
- Commission executive: Joseph Longo, Chair
- Parent department: Treasury
- Website: asic.gov.au

The Australian Securities and Investments Commission (ASIC) is an independent commission of the Australian Government tasked as the national corporate regulator. ASIC's role is to regulate company and financial services and enforce laws to protect Australian consumers, investors and creditors. ASIC, which reports to the treasurer, was established on 1 July 1998 following recommendations from the Wallis Inquiry.

== Areas of responsibility ==
ASIC's authority and scope are determined by the Australian Securities and Investments Commission Act 2001.

ASIC's areas of responsibility include:

- corporate governance
- financial services
- securities and derivatives
- insurance
- consumer protection
- financial literacy

ASIC's consumer website www.moneysmart.gov.au was launched on 15 March 2011. MoneySmart replaced ASIC's two previous consumer websites, FIDO and Understanding Money. MoneySmart aims to help people make good financial decisions by providing free, independent and unbiased information, tools and resources.

ASIC is responsible for the administering the following legislation:

- Australian Securities and Investments Commission Act 2001 (ASIC Act)
- Business Names Registration Act 2011
- Corporations Act 2001 (Corporations Act)
- Insurance Contracts Act 1984
- National Consumer Credit Protection Act 2009 (National Credit Act)

Additionally, ASIC is also responsible for administering parts of the following legislation:

- Banking Act 1959
- Life Insurance Act 1995
- Medical Indemnity (Prudential Supervision and Product Standards) Act 2003
- Retirement Savings Accounts Act 1997
- Superannuation (Resolution of Complaints) Act 1993
- Superannuation Industry (Supervision) Act 1993 (SIS Act).

== Registers ==
ASIC maintains Australia's company and business name registers, which can be searched online. The types of organisations that can be searched online include companies, registered bodies, foreign companies, associations, managed investment schemes and non-registered entities. The information that is available includes current and/or historical information about the organisation, including past addresses, previous directors, and former names, as well as the organisation's unique identification number (ABN, ACN, ARBN, ARSN), type of company or organisation (e.g., proprietary company, limited by shares), date it was registered, the next review date, location of registered office (town or suburb only), and any professional licences or registrations (e.g. an Australian financial services licence or credit licence).

== History ==
ASIC was originally formed as the Australian Securities Commission (ASC), established on 1 January 1991 by the (then) ASC Act 1989. The purpose of ASC was to unify corporate regulators around Australia by replacing the National Companies and Securities Commission and the Corporate Affairs offices of the states and territories.

The corporate regulator became the Australian Securities and Investments Commission (ASIC) on 1 July 1998, when it also became responsible for consumer protection in superannuation, insurance and deposit taking. It has since gained further responsibilities: in 2002 for credit, the Australian Stock Exchange in 2009, and Chi-X in 2011.

== Criticisms ==
In 2012, ASIC called for powers to use data which had been intercepted by other intelligence agencies.

In recent times ASIC has become the subject of criticism by consumers, consumer advocates and public officials over its inaction and inefficiencies in protecting consumers from large financial institutions.

In 2015–2016 ASIC was subject to a class action claim of negligence by persons affected by the Storm Financial collapse for an alleged failure to take action, amounting to malfeasance. However, Justice Gleeson of the Federal Court of Australia struck out the statement of claim of the plaintiffs as being unarguable.

ASIC has not acted against the Financial Ombudsman Service (Australia) (FOS) despite the organisation being exposed as having generated misleading file notes and then attempting to offer them in the discovery phase in a Victorian Supreme Court case. FOS were caught out and exposed by a consumer and ASIC has not acted against FOS.

ASIC did commence proceedings against the largest four banks in Australia in 2016 for rigging of Australian benchmark interest rates. However criticism has been leveled against the regulator for failing to take action for over five years. Questions remain about how this will affect consumer civil causes of action against banks involved, given that the statute of limitations tends to be six years in Australia.

In 2016, ASIC became the subject of heavy criticism in the debate concerning the creation of a Royal Commission into banking and financial services.

== See also ==
ASIC

- ASIC v Kobelt
- ASIC v Rich
- Australian Registered Scheme Number

Australian finance:

- Australian Accounting Standards Board
- Australian Prudential Regulation Authority
- Australian Takeovers Panel
- Financial Ombudsman Service (Australia)
- Reserve Bank of Australia

General:

- Economy of Australia
- Securities commission
- List of financial supervisory authorities by country
- List of company registers
