= Administrative Appeals Tribunal =

Australian tribunal

Agency overview
- Formed: 1 July 1976
- Dissolved: 14 October 2024
- Superseding agency: Administrative Review Tribunal
- Jurisdiction: Australia
- Employees: 573 (2017)
- Minister responsible: Mark Dreyfus, Attorney-General
- Agency executive: Justice Emilios Kyrou, President
- Parent department: Attorney-General's Department
- Key document: Administrative Appeals Tribunal Act 1975 (Cth)
- Website: aat.gov.au

The Administrative Appeals Tribunal (AAT) was an Australian tribunal that conducted independent merits review of administrative decisions made under Commonwealth laws of the Australian Government. The AAT reviewed decisions made by Australian Government ministers, departments and agencies, and in limited circumstances, decisions made by state government and non-government bodies. It also reviewed decisions made under Norfolk Island laws. It was not a court and not part of the Australian court hierarchy; however, its decisions were subject to review by the Federal Court of Australia and the Federal Circuit Court of Australia. The AAT was established by the Administrative Appeals Tribunal Act 1975 and started operation in 1976.

On 1 July 2015, the Migration Review Tribunal, Refugee Review Tribunal and Social Security Appeals Tribunal became divisions of the Administrative Appeals Tribunal.

In December 2022, Attorney-General Mark Dreyfus announced that the AAT would be abolished and replaced with a new body. The new body was named the Administrative Review Tribunal.

On 14 October 2024 the AAT was abolished and replaced with the Administrative Review Tribunal.

== Origins ==
The AAT was established by the Administrative Appeals Tribunal Act 1975 and commenced operations on 1 July 1976.

== Organisation ==
The AAT managed its workload into the following divisions:

- Freedom of Information Division (FOI Division)
- General Division
- Migration and Refugee Division
- National Disability Insurance Scheme Division (NDIS Division)
- Security Division
- Small Business Taxation Division
- Social Services and Child Support Division
- Taxation and Commercial Division
- Veterans' Appeals Division

== Jurisdiction ==
The AAT did not have a general jurisdiction to review administrative decisions. Rather the individual statutes that empowered agencies or ministers to make decisions also granted jurisdiction to the AAT to review those decisions. For example, certain decisions made by a delegate of the Minister for Immigration and Citizenship under the Migration Act 1958 may have been subject to merits review in the AAT. The right of review was provided for in the Migration Act itself.

The Tribunal was not a court. The High Court has long held that the Australian Constitution, mandates a separation of powers between the executive, legislative and judicial branches of government. Judicial review of administrative decisions takes place in courts, such as the Federal Court and the Federal Circuit Court. The AAT was part of the executive branch of government.

The AAT had jurisdiction to review a number of decisions made under Commonwealth legislation, including in the areas of taxation, immigration, social security, industrial law, corporations and bankruptcy. These decisions may have been made by officials including government ministers, departments, public servants with delegated authority and statutory government bodies. The authority to review administrative decisions was limited to specific areas of government administration where an Act, regulation or other legislative instrument provided for a review by the AAT. The Tribunal had no power to enquire into government decisions generally. More than 400 federal Acts provided for review by the AAT. The Tribunal also had powers to review the decisions of some other Australian tribunals, such as the Veterans' Review Board. The Tribunal had no power to consider the constitutional validity of particular laws or the legality of government decision-making, but only whether decisions made by government officials were made in accordance with the relevant statutory requirements.

The AAT's review of government decisions was merit based: it considered whether, on the facts presented to the Tribunal, the correct or preferable decision was made in respect of the applicable law(s) and government procedures. Hearings were conducted de novo and the AAT was not restricted to the material before the original decision maker in making its decision if new information had arisen after the original decision was made. Section 43(1) of the Administrative Appeals Tribunal Act stated that the AAT could exercise all the powers and discretions of the original decision maker. It could 'stand in the shoes of the original decision maker' and reconsider the decision using whatever information is brought before it or available to it.

== Structure ==
The Administrative Appeals Tribunal (AAT) consisted of the President and other members who could be appointed as:

- Deputy Presidents
- Senior Members, or
- Members.

The President was responsible for the overall management of the Tribunal with the assistance of Division Heads and the Registrar. Staff were employed under the Public Service Act 1999 to assist the AAT to carry out its functions.

The President of the AAT was required to be a judge of the Federal Court of Australia. The AAT's other members could be:

- judges of the Federal Court or Family Court of Australia (part-time Deputy Presidents)
- lawyers of at least five years' standing, or
- persons of relevant knowledge or skills.

Although the President of the AAT was required to be a judge of the Federal Court, they served on the AAT in a personal, not judicial, capacity.

Members of the AAT came from a range of backgrounds and included persons with expertise in accountancy, aviation, engineering, environmental science, law, medicine, pharmacology, military affairs, public administration, and taxation. Members of the AAT were appointed by the Governor-General on a full-time or part-time basis. Appointments could be made for a term of up to seven years. Members could be reappointed.

Members of the Tribunal who were legally qualified and had 5 years' standing could be authorised to exercise additional powers under a number of other Acts. This included the power to issue telecommunications interception warrants and stored communications warrants under the Telecommunications (Interception and Access) Act 1979, issue warrants and exercise related powers under the Surveillance Devices Act 2004, and review certificates that authorised controlled operations under the Crimes Act 1914. Presidential Members and Senior Members who were legally qualified and had 5 years' standing, could be appointed as approved examiners under the Proceeds of Crime Act 2002. The President and Deputy Presidents could be appointed as issuing authorities in relation to the making of continued preventative detention orders under the Criminal Code.

== See also ==
- Judiciary of Australia
- List of Commonwealth courts and tribunals
- Fraser government
