= List of judges of the Family Court of Australia =

Judges of the Family Court of Australia, include the Chief Justice, Deputy Chief Justice, Judges of the Appeal Division, current, and former judges as of 24 October 2018. They include judges who hold a concurrent commission with the Family Court of Western Australia.

| Position | Name | Appointment commenced | Appointment ended | Term | Comments | Notes |
|---|---|---|---|---|---|---|
| Chief Justice | Elizabeth Evatt | 5 January 1976 | 5 January 1988 | 12 years, 0 days | | |
| Chief Justice | Alastair Nicholson | 1 February 1988 | 2 July 2004 | 16 years, 152 days | | |
| Chief Justice | Diana Bryant | 5 July 2004 | 12 October 2017 | 13 years, 99 days | | |
| Chief Justice | John Pascoe | 13 October 2017 | 9 December 2018 | 1 year, 57 days | | |
| Chief Justice | Will Alstergren | 10 December 2018 | | 6 years, 87 days | Joint commission as Chief Judge of the Federal Circuit Court of Australia | |
| Deputy Chief Justice | John Faulks | 25 June 2004 | 30 October 2016 | 12 years, 127 days | | |
| Deputy Chief Justice | Robert McClelland | 10 December 2018 | | 6 years, 86 days | | |
| Judge of the Appeals Division | Steven Strickland | 22 November 1999 | | 25 years, 104 days | | |
| Judge of the Appeals Division | Garry Watts | 14 April 2005 | | 19 years, 326 days | | |
| Judge of the Appeals Division | Judith Ryan | 31 July 2006 | | 18 years, 218 days | | |
| Judge of the Appeals Division | Peter Murphy | 11 October 2007 | 1 May 2019 | 11 years, 202 days | | |
| Judge of the Appeals Division | Stewart Austin | 13 July 2009 | | 15 years, 236 days | | |
| Judge of the Appeals Division | Ann Ainslie-Wallace | 9 July 2010 | | 14 years, 240 days | | |
| Judge of the Appeals Division | Michael Kent | 12 July 2011 | | 13 years, 237 days | | |
| Judge of the Appeals Division | Murray Aldridge | 13 December 2012 | | 12 years, 83 days | | |
| Judge of the Appeals Division | Peter Tree | 14 January 2013 | | 12 years, 51 days | | |
| Judge | Austin Asche | 5 January 1976 | 3 April 1986 | 10 years, 88 days | | |
| Judge | John Marshall | 5 January 1976 | 5 September 1982 | 6 years, 243 days | | |
| Judge | Kenneth Pawley | 5 January 1976 | 10 January 1986 | 10 years, 5 days | | |
| Judge | Alan Demack | 21 January 1976 | 15 January 1978 | 1 year, 359 days | | |
| Judge | Ray Watson | 21 January 1976 | 1 April 1994 | 18 years, 70 days | | |
| Judge | John Fogarty | 3 February 1976 | 2 October 1998 | 22 years, 241 days | | |
| Judge | Harry Emery | 6 February 1976 | 4 July 1988 | 12 years, 149 days | | |
| Judge | Kemeri Murray | 6 February 1976 | 16 December 2006 | 30 years, 313 days | | |
| Judge | Rodney Charles Wood | 9 February 1976 | 5 September 1991 | 15 years, 208 days | | |
| Judge | Basil Hogan | 27 February 1976 | 11 December 1988 | 12 years, 288 days | | |
| Judge | Margaret Lusink | 27 February 1976 | 13 August 1988 | 12 years, 168 days | | |
| Judge | Travis Lindenmayer | 27 February 1976 | 31 December 2002 | 26 years, 307 days | | |
| Judge | Thomas McGovern | 27 February 1976 | 26 October 1996 | 20 years, 242 days | | |
| Judge | Graham Bell | 27 February 1976 | 27 February 2015 | 39 years, 0 days | | |
| Judge | William Griffith Dovey | 27 February 1976 | 31 May 1989 | 13 years, 93 days | | |
| Judge | William Simpson | 11 June 1976 | 19 October 1991 | 15 years, 130 days | | |
| Judge | Bryce Ross-Jones | 11 June 1976 | 4 February 1995 | 18 years, 238 days | | |
| Judge | Thomas Joske | 11 June 1976 | 22 November 2005 | 29 years, 164 days | | |
| Judge | Josephine Maxwell | 21 June 1976 | 16 July 1999 | 23 years, 25 days | | |
| Judge | Steven Strauss | 12 July 1976 | 3 January 1994 | 17 years, 175 days | | |
| Judge | John Gun | 19 July 1976 | 20 February 1998 | 21 years, 223 days | | |
| Judge | Joseph Goldstein | 15 October 1976 | 28 February 1979 | 2 years, 136 days | | |
| Judge | Hubert Frederico | 15 October 1976 | 24 April 2003 | 26 years, 191 days | | |
| Judge | Geoffrey Walsh | 4 January 1977 | 3 June 1995 | 18 years, 150 days | | |
| Judge | Adrian Smithers | 17 January 1977 | 15 March 2002 | 25 years, 57 days | | |
| Judge | Adrian Cook | 17 January 1977 | 15 March 2002 | 13 years, 231 days | | |
| Judge | Gordon Yuill | 13 April 1977 | 10 February 1990 | 12 years, 303 days | | |
| Judge | Robert Bulley | 18 April 1977 | 17 July 1995 | 18 years, 90 days | | |
| Judge | David Tonge | 28 October 1977 | 2 January 1987 | 9 years, 66 days | | |
| Judge | David Opas | 31 October 1977 | 23 June 1980 | 2 years, 236 days | | |
| Judge | Brian Treyvaud | 3 November 1977 | 3 March 1995 | 17 years, 120 days | | |
| Judge | Ernie Lambert | 10 November 1977 | 10 August 1990 | 12 years, 273 days | | |
| Judge | Edward Butler | 16 November 1977 | 30 June 1997 | 19 years, 226 days | | |
| Judge | William David Nobbs | 18 November 1977 | 4 May 1981 | 3 years, 169 days | | |
| Judge | Peter Underhill | 31 January 1978 | 31 December 1997 | 19 years, 334 days | | |
| Judge | John Ellis | 31 January 1978 | 23 August 2004 | 26 years, 205 days | | |
| Judge | John Gibson | 10 July 1978 | 14 August 1985 | 7 years, 35 days | | |
| Judge | Eric Baker | 10 July 1978 | 19 January 1999 | 20 years, 193 days | | |
| Judge | Peter Nygh | 2 July 1979 | 10 July 1993 | 14 years, 8 days | | |
| Judge | Peter Hase | 10 December 1979 | 27 January 1998 | 18 years, 48 days | | |
| Judge | John Elliott | 19 December 1979 | 1 May 1991 | 11 years, 133 days | | |
| Judge | Richard Gee | 25 July 1980 | 1 August 1998 | 18 years, 7 days | | |
| Judge | David Haese | 4 September 1981 | 1 August 1995 | 13 years, 331 days | | |
| Judge | Doreen Bulbeck | 11 January 1982 | 26 January 1998 | 16 years, 15 days | | |
| Judge | Neil Buckley | 7 February 1983 | 31 August 2006 | 23 years, 205 days | | |
| Judge | Margaret Renaud | 8 September 1983 | 28 August 1998 | 14 years, 354 days | | |
| Judge | James Barry | 12 December 1983 | 27 June 2011 | 27 years, 197 days | | |
| Judge | John Purdy | 23 August 1984 | 23 September 2005 | 21 years, 31 days | | |
| Judge | Rodney Purvis | 11 March 1985 | 30 March 1998 | 13 years, 19 days | | |
| Judge | John Wilczek | 1 November 1985 | 11 February 2005 | 19 years, 102 days | | |
| Judge | Warwick Rourke | 31 January 1986 | 5 February 2001 | 15 years, 5 days | | |
| Judge | Hugh Burton | 5 June 1986 | 30 September 1999 | 13 years, 117 days | | |
| Judge | Joseph Kay | 12 June 1986 | 25 February 2008 | 21 years, 258 days | | |
| Judge | Graham Mullane | 28 July 1986 | 30 September 2008 | 22 years, 64 days | | |
| Judge | Mary Jane Lawrie | 21 August 1986 | 9 March 2007 | 20 years, 200 days | | |
| Judge | Anthony Graham | 5 June 1987 | 15 July 1998 | 11 years, 40 days | | |
| Judge | Alwynne Rowlands | 13 April 1988 | 10 January 2006 | 17 years, 272 days | | |
| Judge | Peter Moss | 2 May 1988 | 2 July 2000 | 12 years, 61 days | | |
| Judge | John Cohen | 1 February 1989 | 4 March 2011 | 22 years, 31 days | | |
| Judge | Mary Finn | 2 July 1990 | 3 July 2016 | 26 years, 1 day | | |
| Judge | Nahum Mushin | 26 October 1990 | 30 November 2011 | 21 years, 35 days | | |
| Judge | Colleen Moore | 18 April 1991 | 31 July 2009 | 18 years, 104 days | | |
| Judge | Ian Coleman | 18 April 1991 | 8 May 2013 | 22 years, 20 days | | |
| Judge | Peter Hilton | 25 July 1991 | 6 June 2000 | 8 years, 317 days | | |
| Judge | Michael Hannon | 26 August 1991 | 20 September 2005 | 14 years, 25 days | | |
| Judge | Bernard Warnick | 2 September 1991 | 31 March 2010 | 18 years, 210 days | | |
| Judge | Richard Chisholm | 21 September 1993 | 14 June 2004 | 10 years, 267 days | | |
| Judge | Sally Brown | 23 November 1993 | 2 June 2010 | 16 years, 191 days | | |
| Judge | Brian Jordan | 27 July 1994 | 31 December 2009 | 15 years, 157 days | | |
| Judge | Stephen O'Ryan | 11 October 1994 | 15 March 2011 | 16 years, 155 days | | |
| Judge | John Faulks | 11 October 1994 | 25 June 2004 | 9 years, 258 days | Promoted to Deputy Chief Justice | |
| Judge | Linda Dessau | 20 June 1995 | 21 June 2013 | 18 years, 1 day | | |
| Judge | Susan Morgan | 30 June 1995 | 24 February 2006 | 10 years, 239 days | | |
| Judge | Michelle May | 5 September 1995 | 31 July 2017 | 21 years, 329 days | | |
| Judge | Christine Dawe | 3 March 1997 | 3 March 2017 | 20 years, 0 days | | |
| Judge | John Steele | 1 December 1997 | 15 January 2008 | 10 years, 45 days | | |
| Judge | John Jerrard | 20 March 1998 | 29 May 2002 | 4 years, 70 days | | |
| Judge | Rodney Burr | 2 April 1998 | 25 May 2012 | 14 years, 53 days | | |
| Judge | Paul Guest | 1 May 1998 | 5 May 2008 | 10 years, 4 days | | |
| Judge | Heather Carter | 1 June 1998 | 18 July 2008 | 10 years, 47 days | | |
| Judge | Lloyd Waddy | 1 July 1998 | 22 December 2009 | 11 years, 174 days | | |
| Judge | Ann Robinson | 7 September 1998 | 19 June 2002 | 3 years, 285 days | | |
| Judge | Michael Watt | 14 December 1998 | 15 December 2008 | 10 years, 1 day | | |
| Judge | Peter Rose | 21 December 1998 | 1 July 2011 | 12 years, 192 days | | |
| Judge | Robyn Flohm | 17 May 1999 | 29 April 2010 | 10 years, 347 days | | |
| Judge | David Collier | 19 July 1999 | 23 July 2013 | 14 years, 4 days | | |
| Judge | Jennifer Boland | 29 October 1999 | 4 February 2011 | 11 years, 98 days | | |
| Judge | Robert Monteith | 28 November 2000 | 30 November 2011 | 11 years, 2 days | | |
| Judge | Janine Stevenson | 18 May 2001 | | 23 years, 292 days | | |
| Judge | Mark Le Poer Trench | 10 October 2001 | 1 November 2018 | 17 years, 22 days | | |
| Judge | Peter Young | 26 August 2002 | 9 May 2013 | 10 years, 256 days | | |
| Judge | Elizabeth O'Reilly | 10 January 2003 | 31 January 2013 | 10 years, 21 days | | |
| Judge | Tim Carmody | 7 July 2003 | 8 July 2008 | 5 years, 1 day | | |
| Judge | Stephen Thackray | 1 December 2004 | 6 January 2019 | 14 years, 36 days | Chief Judge of the Family Court of Western Australia | |
| Judge | Robert Benjamin | 19 August 2005 | | 19 years, 199 days | | |
| Judge | Victoria Bennett | 30 November 2005 | | 19 years, 96 days | | |
| Judge | Paul Cronin | 20 December 2006 | 18 April 2019 | 12 years, 119 days | | |
| Judge | Stuart Fowler | 16 November 2007 | 14 November 2013 | 5 years, 363 days | | |
| Judge | Simon Moncrieff | 31 August 2009 | | 15 years, 187 days | Judge of the Family Court of Western Australia | |
| Judge | Margaret Cleary | 8 July 2010 | | 14 years, 241 days | | |
| Judge | William Johnston | 12 July 2010 | 4 September 2019 | 14 years, 237 days | | |
| Judge | Ian Loughnan | 12 July 2010 | | 14 years, 237 days | | |
| Judge | Colin Forrest | 2 February 2011 | | 14 years, 32 days | | |
| Judge | Kirsty Macmillan | 14 December 2011 | | 13 years, 82 days | | |
| Judge | Anne Rees | 15 December 2011 | | 13 years, 81 days | | |
| Judge | Susan Duncanson | 6 December 2012 | | 12 years, 90 days | Judge of the Family Court of Western Australia | |
| Judge | John Walters | 6 December 2012 | | 12 years, 90 days | Judge of the Family Court of Western Australia | |
| Judge | Jenny Hogan | 14 January 2013 | | 12 years, 51 days | | |
| Judge | Jennifer Coate | 31 January 2013 | 8 February 2019 | 6 years, 25 days | | |
| Judge | David Berman | 18 July 2013 | | 11 years, 231 days | | |
| Judge | Sharon Johns | 29 July 2013 | | 11 years, 220 days | | |
| Judge | Garry Foster | 8 August 2013 | | 11 years, 210 days | | |
| Judge | Christine Thornton | 12 August 2013 | 14 December 2018 | 5 years, 124 days | | |
| Judge | Hilary Hannam | 12 August 2013 | | 11 years, 205 days | | |
| Judge | Catherine Carew | 7 March 2016 | | 8 years, 364 days | | |
| Judge | Richard O'Brien | 12 April 2016 | | 8 years, 328 days | Judge of the Family Court of Western Australia | |
| Judge | Shane Gill | 16 May 2016 | | 8 years, 294 days | | |
| Judge | Michael Baumann | 11 January 2018 | | 7 years, 54 days | | |
| Judge | Gail Sutherland | 16 March 2018 | | 6 years, 355 days | Chief Judge of the Family Court of Western Australia | |
| Judge | Louise Henderson | 8 February 2019 | | 6 years, 26 days | | |
| Judge | Jillian Williams | 8 February 2019 | | 6 years, 26 days | | |
| Judge | Ciara Tyson | 22 February 2019 | | 6 years, 12 days | Judge of the Family Court of Western Australia | |
| Judge | Joshua Wilson | 11 March 2019 | | 5 years, 360 days | | |
| Judge | Robert Harper | 11 March 2019 | | 5 years, 360 days | | |
| Judge | Christine Mead | 25 March 2019 | | 5 years, 346 days | | |
| Judge | Norah Hartnett | 25 March 2019 | | 5 years, 346 days | | |
| Judge | Timothy McEvoy | 27 March 2019 | | 5 years, 344 days | | |
