= List of the first women appointed to Australian judicial positions =

This is a list of the first women judge(s) in Australia. The first court was established in 1788, the first woman to be awarded a Bachelor of Laws degree graduated in 1903, and the first woman barrister was admitted in 1905. It was not until 1965 that the first woman (Roma Mitchell) was appointed to an Australian judicial position. These pioneering Australians have been described as members of the FW2 club or First Woman to club. The list includes positions to which no woman has been appointed as of March 2022. It does not include abolished courts to which no woman was appointed, such as the Commonwealth Industrial Court.

For a list of the first women lawyers see list of first women lawyers (Australia)

Jurisdiction	first woman to be appointed	Name	Date	Comments	Notes
Commonwealth	Chief Justice of Australia	Susan Kiefel	31 January 2017		
Commonwealth	Justice of the High Court	Mary Gaudron	6 February 1987		
Commonwealth	Chief Justice of the Federal Court	Debra Mortimer	7 April 2023		
Commonwealth	Judge of the Federal Court	Deirdre O'Connor	1 July 1990		
Commonwealth	President of the Australian Administrative Appeals Tribunal	Deirdre O'Connor	1 July 1990		
Commonwealth	Presidents of the Australian Industrial Relations Commission	Deirdre O'Connor	1 March 1994		
Commonwealth	Chief Justice of the Family Court (Note: Now the Chief Justice of the Federal Circuit and Family Court of Australia)	Elizabeth Evatt	11 November 1976		
Commonwealth	Judge of the Family Court	Elizabeth Evatt	11 November 1976		
Commonwealth	Chief Federal Magistrate	Diana Bryant	11 May 2000		
Commonwealth	Federal Magistrate	Norah Hartnett; Christine Mead; Judy Ryan	28 June 2000		
NSW	Chief Justice				
NSW	President of the Court of Appeal	Margaret Beazley	1 March 2013		
NSW	Judge of Appeal	Margaret Beazley	29 April 1996		
NSW	Judge of the Supreme Court	Jane Mathews	7 July 1987		
NSW	Chief Judge of the Land & Environment Court	Mahla Pearlman	6 April 1992		
NSW	Judge of the Land & Environment Court	Mahla Pearlman	6 April 1992		
NSW	Judge of the Industrial Court	Leone Glynn	14 April 1980		
NSW	Chief Judge of the District Court	Sarah Huggett	29 April 2024		
NSW	Judge of the District Court	Jane Mathews	1980		
Victoria	Chief Justice	Marilyn Warren	25 November 2003		
Victoria	President of the Court of Appeal	Karin Emerton	21 June 2022		
Victoria	Judge of the Court of Appeal	Susan Kenny	25 July 1997		
Victoria	Supreme Court	Rosemary Balmford	6 March 1996		
Victoria	Chief Judge of the County Court				
Victoria	Judge of the County Court	Lynette Schiftan	1985		
Queensland	Chief Justice	Catherine Holmes	11 September 2015		
Queensland	President of the Court of Appeal	Margaret McMurdo	30 July 1998		
Queensland	Judge of the Supreme Court	Margaret White	2 April 1992		
Queensland	Chief Judge of the District Court	Patsy Wolfe	1999		
Queensland	Judge of the District Court	Margaret McMurdo	29 January 1991		
South Australia	Chief Justice				
South Australia	Judge of the Supreme Court	Roma Mitchell	23 September 1965		
South Australia	Chief Judge of the District Court				
South Australia	Judge of the District Court	Kemeri Murray	1973		
South Australia	Chief Magistrate	Elizabeth Bolton	February 2007		
Tasmania	Chief Justice				
Tasmania	Supreme Court	Shan Tennent	15 March 2005		
Western Australia	Chief Justice				
Western Australia	President Court of Appeal	Carmel McLure	November 2009		
Western Australia	Judge of the Supreme Court	Christine Wheeler	30 October 1996		
Western Australia	Chief Judge of the Family Court	Gail Sutherland	7 January 2019		
Western Australia	Family Court	Elizabeth Evatt	5 January 1976		
Western Australia	Chief Judge of the District Court	Antoinette Kennedy	1 January 2004		
Western Australia	Judge of the District Court	Antoinette Kennedy	15 March 1985		
ACT	Chief Justice	Helen Murrell	28 October 2013		
ACT	Additional judge of the Supreme Court	Margaret Beazley	22 June 1994		
ACT	Resident judge of the Supreme Court	Hilary Penfold	1 February 2008		
ACT	Chief Magistrate	Lorraine Walker	13 October 2011		
ACT	Magistrate	Karen Fryar	6 September 1993		
NT	Chief Justice				
NT	Supreme Court	Sally Thomas	30 July 1992		
Norfolk Island	Chief Justice				
Norfolk Island	Supreme Court	Susan Kiefel	16 December 2004		
