= Gronow v Gronow =

Judgement of the High Court of Australia

- Court: High Court of Australia
- Decided: 14 December 1979
- Citations: [1979] HCA 63, (1979) 144 CLR 513

Case history
- Prior actions: Family Court, Evatt CJ, unreported June 1978; Full Court of the Family Court, Watson, Fogarty & Joske JJ, unreported January 1979
- Subsequent actions: Family Court, Evatt CJ, unreported

Court membership
- Judges sitting: Stephen, Mason, Murphy, Aickin & Wilson JJ

Case opinions
- 5:0 There is no principle or presumption that children are better off in the custody of their mother 4:1 custody is a discretionary decision that an appeal court cannot overturn unless there is identified error.Murphy J dissenting

Gronow v Gronow, was a decision of the High Court of Australia.

It is an important case in Australian Family Law for two main propositions. The first is that there is no presumption at law that children are better off in their mother's custody. The second is that custody is a discretionary decision, and as such, is only to be overturned by an appellate court if there existed an error of law.

== Background ==
The case involved a custody dispute. Under the relevant act, in determining the custody of the children, the court was to regard the interests of the children as the paramount consideration.

Previous High Court authority upon similar provisions in similar acts (Note: Matrimonial Causes Act 1959, which provided at section 85 that in proceedings about "the custody, guardianship, welfare, advancement or education of children of a marriage ... the court shall regard the interests of the children as the paramount consideration") contained varying comments about the role of a mother in raising children, that on balance appeared to favour the granting of custody to mothers. (Note: There were a series of cases in the High Court, Storie v Storie, Lovell v Lovell, and Kades v Kades, which made comment about the role of a mother in raising children. Some judges, such as Dixon J, and Latham CJ, said that this was the usual outcome rather than a rule or presumption, an outcome that McTiernan J said applied when the mother remained at home and devoted herself to the child. Others such as Rich J, and Starke J put it more strongly with Starke J holding that "there are the strongest reasons, based on fundamental natural and social laws for holding that, in the absence of very special circumstances, the best interests of the child will be served by leaving it in the custody of one of its parents, and in the case of a female child of tender years in the custody of the mother". Similarly the High Court held that there was a "strong presumption ... founded on experience and upon the nature of ordinary human relationships, that a young child, particularly a girl should preferably be in a mother's custody.) However it was unclear as to whether this presumption was at law, or was merely an expression of the courts about the tendencies of factual findings. Some judgements, such as that of Glass JA of the NSW Court of Appeal clearly embraced a presumption of mothers winning custody. In one judgement he wrote: 'if the parents have separated, they are better off with their mother'. (Note: Glass JA in the NSW Court of Appeal: I am directed by authority to apply the common knowledge possessed by all citizens of the ordinary human nature of mothers. That knowledge includes an understanding of the strong natural bond which exists between mother and child. It includes an awareness that young children are best off with both parents, but if the parents have separated, they are better off with their mother. The bond between a child and a good mother (as this applicant was found to be) expresses itself in an unrelenting and self-sacrificing fondness which is greatly to the child's advantage. Fathers and stepmothers may seek to emulate it and on occasions do so with tolerable success. But the mother's attachment is biologically determined by deep genetic forces which can never apply to them.)

This expressed idea of the 'preferred role of the mother' was criticized by other lower courts. Watson J, Fogarty and Lindenmayer JJ held that "We are of the opinion that the suggested "preferred" role of the mother is not a principle, a presumption, a preference, or even a norm. It is a factor to be taken into consideration where relevant" and disagreed with the approach of Glass JA.

=== Facts ===
The Gronows were married in March 1972 and had a daughter in 1974. The marriage broke down for multiple reasons, including the mother's consumption of alcohol. The couple separated in February 1977 with the daughter, then aged 2, living with the father. The father and mother consented to orders in the Family Court in April 1977 which gave the father custody and the mother access. The mother was granted custody for 4 days per fortnight from December 1977. The case came back before Evatt CJ in 1978 who found that the mother had not drunk alcohol since the separation of the parties and that, provided she continued to accept the responsibility of work and refrained from drinking she was not likely to have further problems in regard to alcohol. Evatt CJ found that the qualities of the two parents were fairly equally balanced, each being able to provide properly for the child and each was a fond and devoted parent. The factor that tipped the balance in favour of the husband was the hostility of the mother to the father displayed in the presence of the child. Evatt CJ ordered in June 1978 that the father have custody and the mother have "reasonable access".

=== Appeal to the Full Court ===
The mother appealed the decision to the Full Court, and a majority, Watson and Joske JJ allowed the appeal. Joske J, with whom Watson J agreed, concluded that the maternal grandmother was to be preferred over the paternal grandmother. Fogarty J dissented, holding that it was inappropriate for an appellate court in a custody case to substitute its own subjective assessment of the evidence for the assessment by the trial judge not only of the evidence but also of the parties as they revealed themselves in the course of the case.

=== Arguments ===
The father was granted special leave to appeal to the High Court, who argued that a decision on custody was a discretionary judgement, and an appellate court was not entitled to substitute its own discretion for that of the trial judge. That is an appeal court could only intervene if the trial judge made an error in the exercise of the discretion. The mother argued that it was proper for an appellate court to exercise an independent discretion in respect of the facts found by the trial judge. Further custody of a young girl should be given to the mother where she was otherwise satisfactory.

== Judgment ==
=== Custody and the preferred role of the mother ===
The majority judgment is that of Mason & Wilson JJ, with whom Aickin J relevantly agreed. The judgement is critical of the views expressed by Glass JA in Epperson v Dampney, noting there was nothing to support the asserted biological and genetic basis for the relationship. They were also critical of the conclusions of the Family Court in Raby, describing it as apparently based on sociological and psychological perceptions that could not be demonstrated to be true and on which expert opinion fluctuated. The majority endorsed the middle ground in Ludlow v Hobbs, that the mother's role was an important factor to be taken into account in the exercise of the Family Court's discretion.

Murphy J, one of the architects of the Family Law Act, noted that there had been significant social change since the nineteenth century, particularly the movement of women into the workforce, accompanied by changed attitude to the roles of spouses, including their rights and duties in relation to the care of children. There was little evidence as to the validity of the 'mother principle' and the court should not be acting in the absence of such evidence. This was an appropriate subject for investigation by the Institute of Family Studies.

Stephen J adopted a different approach, delivering what McLennan says is the clearest discussion of the problem. Stephen J emphasised the question of what was in the best interests of this particular child, having regard to the qualities of each of her parents. To say the biological mother is the preferred custodian of young children, especially girls, was a presumption. Such presumptions should play only a very limited role in custody cases, stating "Even in a community of unchanging social conditions, hard and fast rules or presumptions, based only upon matters of common but not invariable experience, provide a poor basis for the assessment of human behaviour compared with detailed investigation of the individuals in question." In this case the trial judge had detailed evidence about each of the parents such that no presumption was necessary. The trial judge had concluded that each of the parents had much to offer the child and there was little to choose between them. As such different minds might form different views as to the best interests of the child.

=== Appeals from a discretionary decision ===
A second issue in the case was the proper function of an appellate court in considering a challenge to the exercise of judicial discretion, such as a decision in a custody matter. The majority of the High Court rejected the proposition that a decision on custody was an inference to be drawn from the facts found by the trial judge, which an appellate court was in as good a position as the trial judge to draw and that Warren v Coombes, had not changed the "settled principles of law" that applied to an appeal from a discretionary decision.

Murphy J disagreed that the role of an appellate court depended on whether the matter was discretionary or not, holding that the duty of an appellate court was to give the judgment it thought was warranted.

=== The time since the judgment ===
The third issue in the proceeding concerned the lapse of time between the decision of Evatt CJ and the decision of the High Court. Stephen J allowing the appeal would involve yet another change in the custody of the girl in circumstances where the elapsed time of a year was more than a quarter of her life. Stephen J would have stayed the operation of the order to allow the mother to apply for a variation of the custody order. Murphy J would have remitted the matter to Evatt CJ to hear evidence as to the present circumstances of the child and the effect of another change in custody. The majority however allowed the appeal which restored the child to the custody of the father. Following the handing down of the High Court decision, the mother made a fresh application to Evatt CJ and this application was granted.

== Significance ==
The case is regarded as a significant precedent in the area of presumptions about the role of gender in custody applications. The case is part of the Higher School Certificate legal studies curriculum.

In 1995 the Family Law Act was amended to emphasise the importance of the continuation of joint parental responsibility following the breakdown of parental relationships. In 2003 the Australian Institute of Family Studies submitted that :

- The diversity of families and children’s situations reinforces the conclusion that no single post-divorce arrangement is in the best interests of all children.
- Most studies indicate that the interests of children post-divorce are generally best served when children can maintain ongoing and frequent contact with both parents who co-operate and communicate with low levels of conflict.

Since 2006 the Court is required to "consider whether the child spending equal time with each of the parents would be in the best interests of the child" and whether it was reasonably practicable. The High Court held in MRR v GR that these are statutory conditions which must be fulfilled before the Court has power to make a parenting order.
