= Parenting law in Australia =

Parenting law in Australia encompasses a number of areas of law including:

- Parenting arrangements under the Family Law Act - previously referred to as "child custody" laws;
- Child Protection laws, where State Governments have powers to protect children;
- Parentage (who is the legal parent of a child).

In Australia, a child is a person under 18 years old. The majority of the legislation about parenting in Australia does not apply once a child reaches the age of 18.

== Parenting law under the Family Law Act 1975 (Cth) ==
Part VII of the Family Law Act provides power for certain courts to make orders about the parenting of children. The Federal Circuit and Family Court of Australia manages the majority of this work, but in some cases it is conducted by state courts (particularly in regional areas). In Western Australia, the Family Court of Western Australia has jurisdiction over almost all parenting issues.

The Family Law Act applies to the children of married and unmarried parents. The majority of parenting matters falling under the Family Law Act involve separated parents, but the jurisdiction can apply to children of intact relationships (for example, an application may be made by a grandparent to spend time with a child of a married couple.

Part VII has been amended significantly in 1995, 2006, and 2011.

=== "Best interests" test ===
Best interests or best interests of the child is a child rights principle, which derives from Article 3 of the UN Convention on the Rights of the Child, which says that “in all actions concerning children, whether undertaken by public or private social welfare institutions, courts of law, administrative authorities or legislative bodies, the best interests of the child shall be a primary consideration”. Assessing the best interests of a child means to evaluate and balance “all the elements necessary to make a decision in a specific situation for a specific individual child or group of children”.

The best interests of the child in question must be the "paramount consideration" when a court makes a parenting order under the Family Law Act. To determine the best interests of a child the court must take into account the two primary considerations (the benefit to the child of having a meaningful relationship with both parents and the need to protect the child from physical or psychological harm) and a number of additional considerations (such as the views of the child and the capacity of the child's parents to provide for their needs).

=== Parental responsibility ===
Parental responsibility means all of the duties, powers, responsibilities and authority that parents have in relation to children. Each parent automatically has parental responsibility for their children, unless amended by court order.

==== Parental responsibility where no orders are in place ====
If there are no orders in place, each parent can, in theory, independently make decisions about the care of the child. In practice, parents are usually required to make major decisions for a child jointly. For example:

- Many schools will require the agreement of both parents to enrol a child, whether there are orders in place for parental responsibility or not;
- If a parent moves a significant distance from the other parent without agreement, the other parent may bring an application in court to seek the return of the child;
- State laws may require the consent of both parents for certain medical procedures or treatment.

==== Shared parental responsibility ====
If an order is made that 2 or more persons are to share parental responsibility, then:

- those persons must make decisions about "major long-term issues" jointly;
- other issues (day-to-day issues) can be made independently.

"Major long-term issues" is defined as issues "about the care, welfare and development of the child of a long-term nature" including:

- their education;
- their religious and cultural upbringing;
- their health;
- their name;
- changes to their living arrangements that make it significantly more difficult for the child to spend time with a parent.

There is no obligation for parents to jointly agree on decisions that are not about "major long-term issues".

=== "Live with" and "spend time with" arrangements ===
Previously referred to as "custody", orders can be made under the Family Law Act specifying who a child lives with and who they spend time with.

The term "lives with" is generally used when for the parent with whom the child spends more than 50% of the time, or for both parents in equal time arrangements. There is no practical difference between "lives with" and "spends time with".

The question of how much time children spend with each parent (if any) is based on the "best interests" test, where the court must decide what arrangements are in the child's best interests.

==== Equal time arrangements ====
It is a common misconception that the Family Law Act specifies that children should spend equal time with each parent. That is commonly inappropriate, particularly for children under school age.

The most common arrangements made in Australia are for children to live with their mother and spend regular time with their father. Equal time arrangements occur in approximately 9% of separated families.

== Recording agreements and resolving disputes ==
=== Parenting Plans ===
Separated parents can enter into a Parenting Plan pursuant to the Family Law Act, dealing with whom a child is to live, the time a child spends with another person, the allocation of parental responsibility and other matters.

A Parenting Plan is not enforceable by a Court. It cannot be registered in a Court (post amendments made in 2003). They are however, very commonly used and can be very useful for separated parents who do not want the inflexibility and cost involved in obtaining court orders.

=== Family Dispute Resolution ===
Any prospective parties to parenting proceedings under the Family Law Act are required to obtain a "section 60I certificate". This certificate is obtained from a family dispute resolution practitioner, who will attempt to conduct a mediation (family dispute resolution) between the relevant parties.

Parties are exempt from the requirement to obtain a certificate in certain circumstances, including where there has been family violence or circumstances of urgency.

The Federal Circuit and Family Court Rules 2021 place further obligations on prospective applicants to attempt to resolve proceedings before filing an application.

=== Consent Orders ===
Parents can agree to record their agreement by way of consent orders. If there is no current court case, they can apply to the court to record the orders. If agreement is reached during proceedings, consent orders can be made by the Registrar or Judge who is managing the matter.

The court must agree that the proposed orders are in the best interests of the subject child before they will be made.

=== Application to a Court ===
Parties who cannot resolve their parenting dispute can apply for a court with jurisdiction under the Family Law Act to make parenting orders. These applications are generally made to the Federal Circuit and Family Court of Australia (or the Family Court of Western Australia in Western Australia).

Almost all parenting proceedings before a court will involve:

- the parties filing documents setting out the orders they seek and the material supporting those orders;
- dispute resolution (mediation, conciliation, family dispute resolution);
- the preparation of a Family Report by a qualified Family Consultant (generally a person with a social work or psychology background);
- case management by the Court.

== Issues in Family Law Act proceedings ==
=== Independent Children's Lawyers ===
The Court may appoint an Independent Children's Lawyer (an ICL) to represent a child's interests. An ICL does not act on the instructions of the child, but must form an independent view and act in relation to what the ICL believes is the best interests of the child. This contrasts to most state courts, where an ICL will act on the instructions of a child once they reach the age of 12. The test for when an ICL should be appointed considers factors including whether there are allegations of abuse, intractable conflict between the parties, a child of mature years and others.

=== Relocation ===
Relocation matters are those in which a party seeks to move the residence of the child a substantial distance, so that it would impact on the time that the child spends with the other party. The Family Law Act does not address relocation matters and a body of case law has developed.

The best interests of the child remains the paramount consideration. The Court must consider all alternatives to a "coercive order" requiring a parent to move. The relocating party is not required to "justify" the reason to relocate.

=== Multiple applications (so called rule in Rice v Asplund) ===
The Family Law Act does not limit a party filing further parenting proceedings after previous proceedings have been resolved, provided that the child is under the age of 18. The Court however will strike out applications that do not demonstrate a significant change of circumstances justifying a further application.

== See also ==
- Australian family law
- Family Law Act
- Federal Circuit and Family Court of Australia
- Child custody law and theory internationally: Child custody
