= De facto and de jure =

Latin expressions meaning 'from fact' and 'from law'

De facto and de jure are contrasting concepts, with de facto being used to refer to the actual existence of a state of affairs, and de jure being used to refer to the legal existence of something even if it is not represented in reality. These terms are particularly used in the context of law and governance. For example, the de facto ruler of a country is the individual who actually runs the government, and the de jure leader may merely be a legal office holder with little power.

== Jurisprudence ==
In jurisprudence, a de facto law (also known as a de facto regulation) is a law or regulation that is followed but "is not specifically enumerated by a law." By definition, de facto 'contrasts' de jure which means "as defined by law" or "as a matter of law." For example, if a particular law exists in one jurisdiction, but is followed in another where it has no legal effect (such as in another country), then the law could be considered a de facto regulation (a "de facto regulation" is not an officially prescribed legal classification for a type of law in a particular jurisdiction, rather, it is a concept about law(s).

A de facto regulation may be followed by an organization as a result of the market size of the jurisdiction imposing the regulation as a proportion of the overall market; wherein the market share is so large that it results in the organization choosing to comply by implementing one standard of business with respect to the given de facto law instead of altering standards between different jurisdictions and markets (e.g. data protection, manufacturing, etc.).

In prison sentences, the term de facto life sentence (also known as a "virtual" life sentence) is used to describe a "non-life sentence" that is long enough to end after the convicted person would have likely died due to old age, or one long enough to cause the convicted person to "live out the vast majority of their life in jail prior to their release."

In U.S. law, particularly after Brown v. Board of Education (1954), the difference between de facto segregation (that existed because of voluntary associations and neighborhoods) and de jure segregation (that existed because of local laws) became important distinctions for court-mandated remedial purposes.

== Government and culture ==
=== National languages ===
Some countries have a de facto national language in addition to an official language. In Morocco, Arabic and Tamazight are official languages; in addition, French is a de facto national language. In Lebanon, Arabic is the official language; English and French are de facto national languages.

Russian was the de facto language of the central government and, to a large extent, republican governments of the former Soviet Union, but was not declared de jure official language until a short-lived law, effected April 24, 1990, made Russian the sole de jure official language of the Union prior to its dissolution in 1991.

In Hong Kong and Macau, the special administrative regions of China, the official languages are English and Portuguese respectively, together with Chinese. No particular variety of Chinese is specified in law. Cantonese (Hong Kong Cantonese) in traditional Chinese characters is the standard speaking and writing system in both territories, making it the de facto language.

=== Governance and sovereignty ===
De facto political map of the world, May 2019

A de facto government is a government wherein all the attributes of sovereignty have, by usurpation, been transferred from those who had been legally invested with them to others, who, sustained by a power above the forms of law, claim to act and do really act in their stead.

Between 1805 and 1914, the Muhammad Ali dynasty of Egypt were de jure subject to the rulers of the Ottoman Empire, meaning they were formally considered to be under the rule of the Ottomans. However, in practice, they acted as de facto rulers, as they were able to maintain a large degree of independence in their governance of Egypt.

A modern example of a de facto ruler was Ahmed al-Sharaa, who became the de facto leader of Syria until his appointment as President of Syria following the fall of the Assad regime.

==== Borders ====
The de jure borders of a country are defined by the area its government claims, but not necessarily controls. Modern examples include Taiwan (claimed but not controlled by China) and Kashmir (claimed by multiple countries).

==== Segregation ====
In South Africa, although de jure apartheid formally began in 1948, de facto racist policies and practices discriminating against black South Africans, People of Colour, and Indians dated back decades before. (Note: Multiple sources:)

De facto racial discrimination and segregation in the United States (outside of the South) until the 1950s and 1960s was simply discrimination that was not segregation by law (de jure). "Jim Crow laws", which were enacted in the 1870s, brought legal racial segregation against black Americans residing in the American South. These laws were legally ended in 1964 by the Civil Rights Act of 1964.

== Marriage and domestic partnerships ==
=== Relationships ===
A domestic partner outside marriage is referred to as a de facto husband or wife by some authorities.

==== In Australia ====
In Australian law, a de facto relationship is a legally recognized, committed relationship of a couple living together (opposite-sex or same-sex). De facto unions are defined in the federal Family Law Act 1975. De facto relationships provide couples who are living together on a genuine domestic basis with many of the same rights and benefits as married couples. Two people can become a de facto couple by entering into a registered relationship (i.e.: civil union or domestic partnership) or by being assessed as such by the Family Court or Federal Circuit Court. Couples who are living together are generally recognised as a de facto union and thus able to claim many of the rights and benefits of a married couple, even if they have not registered or officially documented their relationship, although this may vary by state. It has been noted that it is harder to prove de facto relationship status, particularly in the case of the death of one of the partners.

In April 2014, an Australian federal court judge ruled that a heterosexual couple who had a child and lived together for 13 years were not in a de facto relationship and thus the court had no jurisdiction to divide up their property under family law following a request for separation. In his ruling, the judge stated "de facto relationship(s) may be described as 'marriage like' but it is not a marriage and has significant differences socially, financially and emotionally."

===== Relationships not recognised outside Australia =====
Due to Australian federalism, de facto partnerships can only be legally recognised whilst the couple lives within a state in Australia. This is because the power to legislate on de facto matters relies on referrals by States to the Commonwealth in accordance with Section 51(xxxvii) of the Australian Constitution, where it states the new federal law can only be applied back within a state. There must be a nexus between the de facto relationship itself and the Australian state.

This is unlike marriage and "matrimonial causes" which are recognised by sections 51(xxi) and (xxii) of the Constitution of Australia and internationally by marriage law and conventions, Hague Convention on Marriages (1978).

== Finance ==
In finance, the World Bank uses the following definition of de facto government:

A "de facto government" comes into, or remains in, power by means not provided for in the country's constitution, such as a coup d'état, revolution, usurpation, abrogation or suspension of the constitution.

== See also ==
- Convention (political norm)
- List of Latin phrases (D)
