= Federal magistrate =

Federal magistrate may refer to:

- Federal Magistrates Court of Australia
- United States magistrate judge

== See also ==
- Federal judge
- Magistrate
