= Paul Cronin (disambiguation) =

Paul Cronin (1938–2019) was an Australian actor.

Paul Cronin may also refer to:

- Paul W. Cronin (1938–1997), American politician
- Paul Cronin (judge) (active since 1980), Australian judge
- Paul D. Cronin (active 1967–2002), American horse rider
