= Leanne Clare =

Australian judge

Judge Leanne Clare

Judge of the District Court of Queensland
- Incumbent
- Assumed office 2 April 2008

Personal details
- Born: Leanne Hurley; 23 July 1962 (age 64) Ipswich, Queensland, Australia
- Education: Queensland University of Technology
- Occupation: Judge, lawyer

Leanne Clare (born 23 July 1962) is a Judge of the District Court of Queensland and a former Queensland Director of Public Prosecutions (DPP). On 2 April 2008 she was appointed to the District Court after eight years as DPP. Between 1999 and 2000 she served as an acting judge at Ipswich District Court.

== Early life and education ==
Clare studied at the Queensland University of Technology, graduating with a Bachelor of Laws in 1984.

== Career ==
Clare was admitted to the Bar in 1985. She spent 14 years working with the Queensland Office of the Director of Public Prosecutions (ODPP), and during that period she served as an acting District Court judge on two occasions. In June, 2000, she was appointed as the new DPP, and in so doing became the first woman to hold the role in Queensland. In 2006, while serving as DPP, Clare was appointed Senior Counsel.

Clare's time as DPP resulted in significant changes to the shape of the Office, including providing a "mentoring system and pathway for young prosecutors". Some of her decisions as Director of Public Prosecutions were described as controversial, such as the decision to prosecute Pauline Hanson for electoral funds fraud and the decision not to prosecute a police officer over a death in custody on Palm Island (even though a Crime and Misconduct Commission misconduct investigation reached the same conclusion in relation to the officer not being criminally responsible for causing the death.), although upon her departure from the position it was also noted that she had led "successful prosecutions of some of the highest profile cases ever in the state".

At the District Court swearing in ceremony, the Chief Judge Patsy Wolfe stated that Clare had filled her previous role as DPP in a "wise and fearless" manner. She further expressed confidence in Clare's appointment to the bench. Queensland Attorney-General Kerry Shine said that she had "...acted with integrity and had been fiercely independent in a very difficult role."
