= Federal Circuit Court =

Federal Circuit Court could refer to:

- Federal Circuit Court of Australia
- Any of the 13 United States courts of appeals, but especially the United States Court of Appeals for the Federal Circuit
- United States circuit court, abolished in 1912
