= MRR v GR =

Court case in Australia about who a child should live with

- Court: High Court of Australia
- Full case name: MRR v GR
- Decided: 3 December 2009 (reasons published 3 March 2010)
- Citations: [2010] HCA 4, (2010) 240 CLR 461 [2010] HCASum 4
- Transcript: [2009] HCATrans 316

Case history
- Prior actions: [2008] FMCAfam 427 (initial application); [2009] FamCAFC 81 (appeal)

Court membership
- Judges sitting: French CJ, Gummow, Hayne, Kiefel & Bell JJ

MRR v GR was an Australian family law case concerning who a child should live with, where the father wanted to remain living in Mount Isa, Queensland, while the mother wanted to return to live in Sydney, NSW. The Family Law Act 1975 makes the "best interests of the child" the paramount consideration when making a parenting order. The High Court of Australia decided that a Federal Magistrate erred by failing to consider the "reasonable practicability" of a parenting order with an equal time arrangement that required the mother to live in Mount Isa. The matter was decided on 3 December 2009 with reasons subsequently published on 3 March 2010.

== Background to the case ==
The appellant and respondent were the mother and father respectively of a child, referred to as "M" in court documents. They had become a couple in 1991, moving into a Sydney house in 1993 and marrying in 2000. M was born in 2002. In January 2007, the family moved to Mount Isa so that the father could take up a two-year graduate work experience position with a mining business, working as a mechanical engineer.

In mid-2007, the family returned to Sydney for the father to attend a graduation awards ceremony, and shortly thereafter, in August, the mother and father separated. The father returned to Mount Isa, whilst the mother and M remained living in the family home in Sydney.

=== Parenting orders ===
Under Part VII, Division 6 of the Family Law Act 1975, the Family Court of Australia and the Federal Magistrates Court of Australia have the power to make parenting orders in relation to a child, on the application of a parent (or both parents) of the child, a grandparent, the child itself, or "any other person concerned with the care, welfare or development of the child". Parenting orders can cover such matters as custody and contact arrangements.

The best interests of the child is the paramount consideration in deciding whether to make a particular parenting order. Amendments to the legislation in 1995 introduced provisions to guide courts making parenting orders, emphasising the importance of the continuation of joint parental responsibility (the sharing of decisions affecting major long-term issues) following the breakdown of parental relationships. In 2006, further amendments introduced a presumption that joint parental responsibility is in the best interests of the child in question (except where there is a reasonable belief that a parent or a person living with them has engaged in child abuse or domestic violence).

Also among the 2006 amendments was the introduction of s 65DAA, which provides in subsection 1 that if a court makes a parenting order providing for joint parental responsibility, it must also:

"(a) consider whether the child spending equal time with each of the parents would be in the best interests of the child; and

(b) consider whether the child spending equal time with each of the parents is reasonably practicable; and

(c) if it is, consider making an order to provide (or including a provision in the order) for the child to spend equal time with each of the parents."

Subsection 2 goes on to provide that if the court does not make an equal time order, it must consider in the same fashion whether it is in the best interests of the child and reasonably practicable that it make an order that the child spend "substantial and significant time with each of the parents".

=== Initial application and appeal ===
After returning to Mount Isa, and whilst M and her mother were living in Sydney, the father applied in the Federal Magistrates Court of Australia for parenting orders under Part VII, Division 6 of the Family Law Act 1975. Interim orders were issued providing for the return of M to Mount Isa, and custody to be shared on a "week about" basis (each parent having custody, in turn, for one week at a time), and accordingly M returned to Mount Isa in October 2007, the mother returning also to be with her. As rental accommodation of acceptable quality was very scarce and expensive in Mount Isa, the mother lived in a caravan park. Although the mother had full-time employment opportunities (including flexible hours to facilitate caring for M) available with her former employer in Sydney, in Mount Isa she had only casual employment available to her, supplemented by social services payments.

Hearings in the Federal Magistrates Court were held on 13, 14 and 20 March 2008 before Coker FM. The father indicated that he did not want to leave Mount Isa, and sought orders substantially the same as the interim ones, effecting an equal time arrangement between the parents in Mount Isa. The mother proposed several alternatives, including that M live with her in Sydney and visit Mount Isa several times a year, that both parents live in Sydney with M primarily living with the mother, or that both parents live in Mount Isa with M primarily living with the mother.

Coker FM delivered his judgment on 1 April 2008, making several parenting orders, including an order providing for joint parental responsibility, an order that M spend equal time with both parents, on a week about basis, and an order that, should the mother leave Mount Isa, M would live with the father.

The mother appealed the decision to the Family Court of Australia, arguing, among other grounds, that Coker FM had erred by failing to consider "an arrangement whereby both parties and the child would return to live in the Sydney area", by failing to consider the mother's financial situation living in Mount Isa, as well as her emotional and physical isolation in living there. A full bench of the Family Court, consisting of Finn, May and Benjamin JJ, dismissed the appeal on 5 August 2008 (though they did not publish their decision until 15 May 2009).

The mother then appealed to the High Court of Australia, with a hearing held on 3 December 2009. The mother was represented by Bret Walker SC.

== Arguments ==
In the High Court, the mother argued primarily that in making the order for equal time, Coker FM had failed "to observe discretely" subsection (b) of s 61DAA(1), that is, the question of whether the child spending equal time with both parents is "reasonably practicable", and had simply treated the question of whether equal time was in the best interests of the child as determinative of the matter. She further argued that Coker FM did not consider matters such as her financial and emotional well-being in Mount Isa, that they were mentioned by Coker FM but not actually addressed, instead "simply outflanked".

The mother argued that the Full Court of the Family Court, in the appeal, had failed to correct these errors by Coker FM. The Full Court had, she argued, "not [appreciated] the incompleteness, the skewed or unbalanced nature of simply taking the father's position as a given and treating the mother's position as something that would, as it were, appropriately move to meet without asking about the reasonable practicability of the mother's position." Indeed, she argued that the Full Court had brushed over Coker FM's errors by saying that "there would have been no point in his Honour's giving any consideration to a proposal whereby both parties would live in the Sydney area."

The mother also argued that order 8 – the order which provided that M live with the father should the mother leave Mount Isa – particularly illustrated "to what an extent there had been a failure to consider reasonable practicability" in relation to M spending equal time with both parents.

The father argued that Coker FM had in fact considered the reasonable practicability of an equal time arrangement, but prefaced this by noting that by the time it came to consider reasonable practicability, Coker FM had already determined that it was in the best interests of M that the parents live in proximity to each other, that M live in Mount Isa and that M spend equal time with the parents. During this argument, Justice Kiefel questioned whether the court had any statutory power to make a decision as to where the parents should live.

The father also argued that factors set out by the legislation which could be considered in relation to the question of reasonable practicability needed to be "touched on", but that "there is no necessity for a judge to direct his attention to each and every one specifically as they are set out or in the order that the legislation provides", and as such there was no error arising merely from Coker FM not expressly considering every factor.

== Judgment ==
The Court adjourned to consider the matter at 4:02 p.m. On returning at 4:16 p.m., the Court ordered that the mother's appeal against the orders of the Federal Magistrates Court be allowed, and that the orders be set aside, and remitted the matter to the Federal Magistrates Court for a de novo hearing. On 3 March 2010 the Court published a unanimous judgment setting out the reasons for its decision, together with a summary of those reasons.

The Court discussed the legislation, identifying the question of reasonable practicability as a discrete one, and holding that "[i]t is clearly intended that the Court determine that question." Indeed, the Court held that a finding that an equal time arrangement is reasonably practicable "is a statutory condition which must be fulfilled before the Court has power to make a parenting order of that kind." Characterising the question of reasonable practicability, the Court said that it "is concerned with the reality of the situation of the parents and the child, not whether it is desirable that there be equal time spent by the child with each parent."

The Court went on to say that Coker FM had treated the question of whether an equal time arrangement was in M's best interests "as determinative of whether an order should be made", and that he had failed to consider reasonable practicability.

In this case, the Court held, an equal time arrangement would only be possible if both parents were to live in Mount Isa, and therefore in assessing reasonable practicability Coker FM "was obliged to consider the circumstances of the parties, more particularly those of the mother". If he had actually considered her circumstances, the Court held, he could only have reached the conclusion that the arrangement would not be reasonably practicable. Thus, the power to make an equal time order was not available to Coker FM, and he ought to have proceeded to consider whether spending "substantial and significant time" with both parents was in M's best interests and reasonably practicable, a process which "would require consideration of the mother being resident in Sydney". The Court indicated their anticipation that the new hearing will make "the necessary determinations... on the evidence as to the practicability of such orders".

Finally, the Court addressed the order that, should the mother leave Mount Isa, M would live with the father, observing that "[n]o reasons were given concerning the order". The Court speculated that it may have been intended as an interim order; it was not, the Court held, a valid parenting order, as the various statutory criteria had not been addressed.
