= Kowaliw v Kowaliw =

Judgement of the Family Court of Australia relating to property orders

- Court: Family Court of Australia
- Full case name: In the marriage of Kowaliw, J.I. and Kowaliw, A.G.
- Decided: 21 September 1981
- Citations: [1981] FamCA 70 (1981) FLC 91-092

Court membership
- Judge sitting: Baker J

Kowaliw v Kowaliw is a decision of the Family Court of Australia concerning the distribution of property under the Family Law Act 1975 that discussed the principles for making property orders that deal with assets lost or disposed of prior to hearing. Kowaliw is the start of a line of authority developed which enables a court to take these losses into account.

== Judgement ==
Justice Baker put the principle in the following terms:

As a statement of general principle. I am firmly of the view that financial loss incurred by the parties in the course of the marriage ... should be shared by them (although not necessarily equally) except in the following circumstances:

(a) where one of the parties has embarked upon a course of conduct designed to reduce or minimise the effective value or worth of matrimonial assets; or

(b) where one of the parties has acted recklessly, negligently or wantonly with matrimonial assets, the overall effect of which has reduced or minimised their value.

== Significance ==
Federal Magistrate Judy Ryan summarised the principles that arise from the case and the line of precedents that followed as:

- The principle in Kowaliw is not a fixed code.
- Kowaliw is a useful guideline for dealing with cases involving lost assets or income.
- In cases involving waste there must be a proper reason for adopting a non Kowaliw approach.
- If the losses occurred in the course of the pursuit of the objectives of the marriage then such losses should be shared by the parties although not necessarily equally.
- The economic consequences of waste must be dealt with in a just and equitable manner.
- The economic consequences (loss) may be treated as a premature distribution of the asset pool and notionally added back as the asset of the party who had its sole benefit.
- Taking the premature distribution into account in a general way pursuant to s 75(2)(o) and applying the cumulative outcome of the s 79(4) and s 75(2) findings to the smaller depleted asset pool may offend s 79(2) notions of justice and equity.
- Where the asset pool had been seriously depleted it may be that only by giving the premature distribution its full dollar value that justice can be given.
- The premature distribution concept is not restricted to post separation transactions.
- Where the monies have been shown to have been reasonably disposed of the notional add back approach should be the exception and not the rule.
- Notional adjustments are not limited to wasted assets but may also include property that has been bona fide disposed of.
- The source of the funds is relevant.
- Notionally included assets may include unascertained assets, even if the precise value is not known.
- Even if the loss does not involve waste, the economic consequences of a significant reduction in the asset pool must be considered.
