= Kemeri Murray =

Australian judge

Kemeri Ann Murray AO (28 January 1932 – 2 August 2013) was an Australian lawyer and judge. She was the first woman appointed to the District Court of South Australia and the second female judge in the country. Upon her retirement in 2006, she was the country's longest serving judge.

== Early life and education ==
Murray was born in Adelaide. She graduated from the University of Adelaide in Law in 1953 and Arts in 1954, studying piano at the Elder Conservatorium of Music.

== Career ==
Murray was admitted as a Barrister and Solicitor in 1955 and became a partner at Giles, Magarey and Lloyd, making her the first married woman partner in a South Australian law firm. She later said, "It was not easy – all sorts of questions were asked, such as when was I going to have children – which would not be asked today. Female practitioners had to prove themselves and I doubt if all were taken seriously."

Murray was appointed as a judge of the District Court in 1973, making her the second female judge in Australia. She was appointed to the Family Court of Australia upon its inception in 1976.

Murray was appointed to the Advisory Council for Inter-Government Relations in 1978. From 1982 until 1985 she chaired the South Australian Sex Discrimination Board. She was alternate chair of the Media Council of Australia for the Alcoholic Beverages Advertising Code Council from 1995 to 1996.

At the time of her retirement in December 2006, Murray was the country's longest serving judicial officer. At her retirement ceremony she "delivered a broadside" at the government's recent law reforms, naming her concern in particular for victims of domestic violence.

== Community involvement ==
Murray was the first female member of the Rotary Club of Adelaide and the first female President of the Commonwealth Club of Australia (1998–1999). She chaired several commissions of the Anglican Church of Australia, including the Commission on Marriage 1975–1978. In 1995, she was appointed a Dame Commander of the Order of Saint Lazarus.

Murray was a supporter and patron of the arts, including the Adelaide Symphony Orchestra, Art Gallery of South Australia and State Opera of South Australia. The Royal South Australian Society of Arts has a named prize in her honour.

== Awards and honours ==
In 1977, Murray was awarded the Queen's Silver Jubilee Medal. In June 2004, she was appointed an Officer in the General Division of the Order of Australia. In 2006, she received an Honorary Doctorate in Law from Flinders University.

== Personal life and death ==
Murray married Eric in 1955 and they had a son and a daughter. She died on 2 August 2013 after a long illness.

== Publications ==
- Murray, Kemeri (1979). "Family Conflict and the Rights of the Child—Statutory Recognition—Policy and Practice". Children Australia. 4 (4): 16–18. doi:10.1017/S0312897000016386. S2CID 157010963.
- Murray, Honourable Justice (December 1988). "The Impossible Dream-Family Integrity, Courts, Welfare, and Allegations of Child Sexual Abuse". Family Court Review. 26 (2): 1–7. doi:10.1111/j.174-1617.1988.tb01031.x.
- Murray, Kemeri (October 1998). "Medical Procedures – Is the Law Effective?" (PDF). Melbourne: Third National Family Court Conference.
