= Alan Demack =

Australian judge (1934–2025)

Alan Demack AO
- Born: 23 September 1934; Caboolture, Queensland, Australia
- Died: 28 January 2025 (aged 90); Rockhampton, Queensland, Australia
- Education: University of Queensland (Bachelor of Laws, 1957)
- Occupation: Judge
- Known for: Being appointed Queensland's first Integrity Commissioner

Alan George Demack AO (23 September 1934 – 28 January 2025) was an Australian judge.

Aside from his lengthy legal career, 22 years of which were spent as a judge with the Supreme Court of Queensland, Demack is arguably best known for being Queensland's first Integrity Commissioner.

== Early life ==
Demack was born in Caboolture, Queensland where he attended Caboolture State School from 1940 until 1948 before obtaining his secondary education at Brisbane Boys' College in the Brisbane suburb of Toowong, graduating in 1952.

He then studied law while living at King's College at the St Lucia campus of the University of Queensland. He graduated with a Bachelor of Laws in 1957.

== Career ==
Demack was admitted to the Supreme Court of Queensland as a barrister on 19 December 1957, after which he practiced law in Brisbane for 14 years.

During this time, Demack served as secretary of the Bar Association of Queensland, a reporter for Queensland State Reports and editor of the Queensland Justice of the Peace and Reports. Demack also authored editions of Allen's Police Offences of Queensland and The Practice of the District Court of Queensland.

Demack was appointed a judge of the District Court of Queensland on 19 May 1972 which was a position he held until he became a senior judge of the Family Court of Australia on 21 January 1976. In 1975, Margaret McMurdo worked as a clerk for Demack.

Throughout the 1970's, Demack held a number of executive positions including chairperson of the Commission of Inquiry into the Status of Women, chairperson of the Commission of Inquiry into Youth, chairperson of the Queensland Marriage Guidance Council and as chairperson of the Queensland Government committee inquiring into teacher education.

Demack was appointed the Central Region judge of the Supreme Court of Queensland on 16 January 1976, based in the city of Rockhampton where he lived for the rest of his life.

He was the last judge to preside over cases in Rockhampton's historic Supreme Court building which was closed when the new Virgil Power Complex was officially opened in April 1998.

In 2010, Demack officially re-opened the historic Supreme Court building for judicial purposes after it had been utilised by Central Queensland University.

While living in Rockhampton, Demack became heavily involved in the community. He served as a chairperson of the board of management of Lifeline Rockhampton, he was the chairperson of the government committee examining the transition of Capricornia College of Advanced Education to university status. He also served as chairperson of the special committee to inquire into the Laws Relating to Artificial Insemination, In Vitro Fertilisation and Other Related Matters. In 2007, the Queensland Government appointed Demack as chairperson of the Queensland Redistribution Commission.

Upon his resignation from the Supreme Court of Queensland on 19 May 2000, Demack became the longest-serving judge in the Central Region's history with over 22 years of service.

In August 2000, Demack was appointed the first Queensland Integrity Commissioner, a role he held until 2004.

In 2019, he authored Pulpit, Pew and Public Life: The Christian and the Secular Nation.

== Personal life and death ==
Demack married Dorothy Alexander at Murrumbeena, Victoria on 21 March 1959. The couple had met in Armidale, New South Wales while she was attending an Australian Student Christian Movement conference while she was serving as the president of the University of Melbourne's SCM committee.

They had three sons and two daughters.

In 2008, Demack's daughter Anne was appointed a judge to the Federal Magistrates Court of Australia and in 2016 Attorney-General George Brandis announced that she would be the new permanent Federal Circuit Judge to be based in Rockhampton.

After 65 years of marriage, Demack's wife Dorothy died on 9 May 2024.

Demack died on 28 January 2025, at the age of 90. His death prompted a number of tributes from the community including former state Labor MP Robert Schwarten who praised Demack as "a man of supreme dignity and strict adherance to the law and also very committed to his church and to the community".

Demack was a devout member of the Uniting Church of Australia where he served as a lay preacher. He also represented the church nationally in a dialogue between the Uniting Church and the Roman Catholic Church where he is credited with being an architect on the policy of intermarriage.

After Demack's death, Uniting Church reverend Andrew Gillies praised his devotion to making his faith and his professional life consistent as he considered his vocation as one having been given by God.

Demack's funeral is scheduled to be held at the South Rockhampton Uniting Church on 14 February 2025.

== Recognition ==
Demack was made a fellow of King's College in 1972.

In the 2000 Queen's Birthday Honours, Demack was made an Officer of the Order of Australia in recognition of both his service to the law and to the Uniting Church of Australia. Also that year, he was awarded an honorary doctorate from Central Queensland University.

In 2001, Demack was made an honorary life member of the Queensland Bar Association.
