= Shane Gill =

Australian judge

Shane Gill is an Australian judge. He has been a judge of the Family Court of Australia since 16 May 2016.

== Early life and education ==
Gill grew up in Orange and relocated to Canberra to pursue a law degree at the Australian National University, enrolling in 1986. He was the first in his family to enter the legal profession.

== Career ==
After graduating, Gill established himself as a barrister in the ACT, building a practice focused on criminal and family law. In October 2014 he was elected president of the ACT Bar Association, among the youngest to hold that office.

In May 2016, Attorney-General George Brandis named Gill as one of four new federal court appointments. He took up his position at the Canberra registry of the Family Court of Australia on 16 May 2016.

== See also ==
- Australian legal system
