= Alastair Nicholson =

Former Chief Justice of the Family Court of Australia

The Honourable Alastair Nicholson AO, RFD, KC

2nd Chief Justice of the Family Court of Australia
- In office 1 February 1988 – 2 July 2004

Personal details
- Born: 19 August 1938 (age 88) Melbourne, Victoria
- Education: University of Melbourne
- Occupation: Barrister; Jurist
- Military career
- Allegiance: Australia
- Branch: Royal Australian Air Force Reserve
- Service years: 1959–92
- Rank: Air Vice Marshal
- Unit: Legal Reserve
- Commands: Judge Advocate General (1987–92)
- Awards: Officer of the Order of Australia; Reserve Force Decoration

Alastair Bothwick Nicholson, AO, RFD, KC (born 19 August 1938) is a retired Australian jurist who served as the Chief Justice of the Family Court of Australia from 1988 until 2004.

== Early life and education ==
Nicholson was born in 1938 in Melbourne returning with his mother Jean to Papua New Guinea, at that time an Australian territory, where his parents owned a rubber and coconut plantation. He was educated at Scotch College Melbourne where he was a boarder, and studied law at the University of Melbourne where he was a resident at Ormond College.

His grandfather was Alexander Nicholson, Chief Commissioner of Victoria Police from 1922 to 1925.

== Career ==
He was admitted as a legal practitioner in Victoria in 1961, and joined the Victorian Bar in 1963. He was appointed Queen's Counsel in 1979 and was a Justice of the Supreme Court of Victoria between 1982 and 1988.

He has long been involved in the Australian Defence Force, being Judge Advocate General between 1987 and 1992. His military involvement commenced with his appointment as a flight lieutenant in the Legal Reserve of the Royal Australian Air Force, through service in Australia and in Vietnam and at Butterworth in Malaysia as defence counsel and Judge Advocate leading ultimately to his promotion to the rank of air vice marshal.

Since 2003 he has been an Honorary Professorial Fellow of the University of Melbourne, originally attached to the Department of Criminology until 2009 and subsequently to the Faculty of Law; and he has been the Chair of the National Centre Against Bullying. He was the founding patron of Children's Rights International in 2001 and has been Chair of that organisation since March 2010. He has been the patron of International Social Service Australia since 2008.

== Notes ==
Legal offices
Preceded by Elizabeth Evatt	Chief Justice of the Family Court of Australia; 1988–2004	Succeeded by Diana Bryant
