= Evatt House =

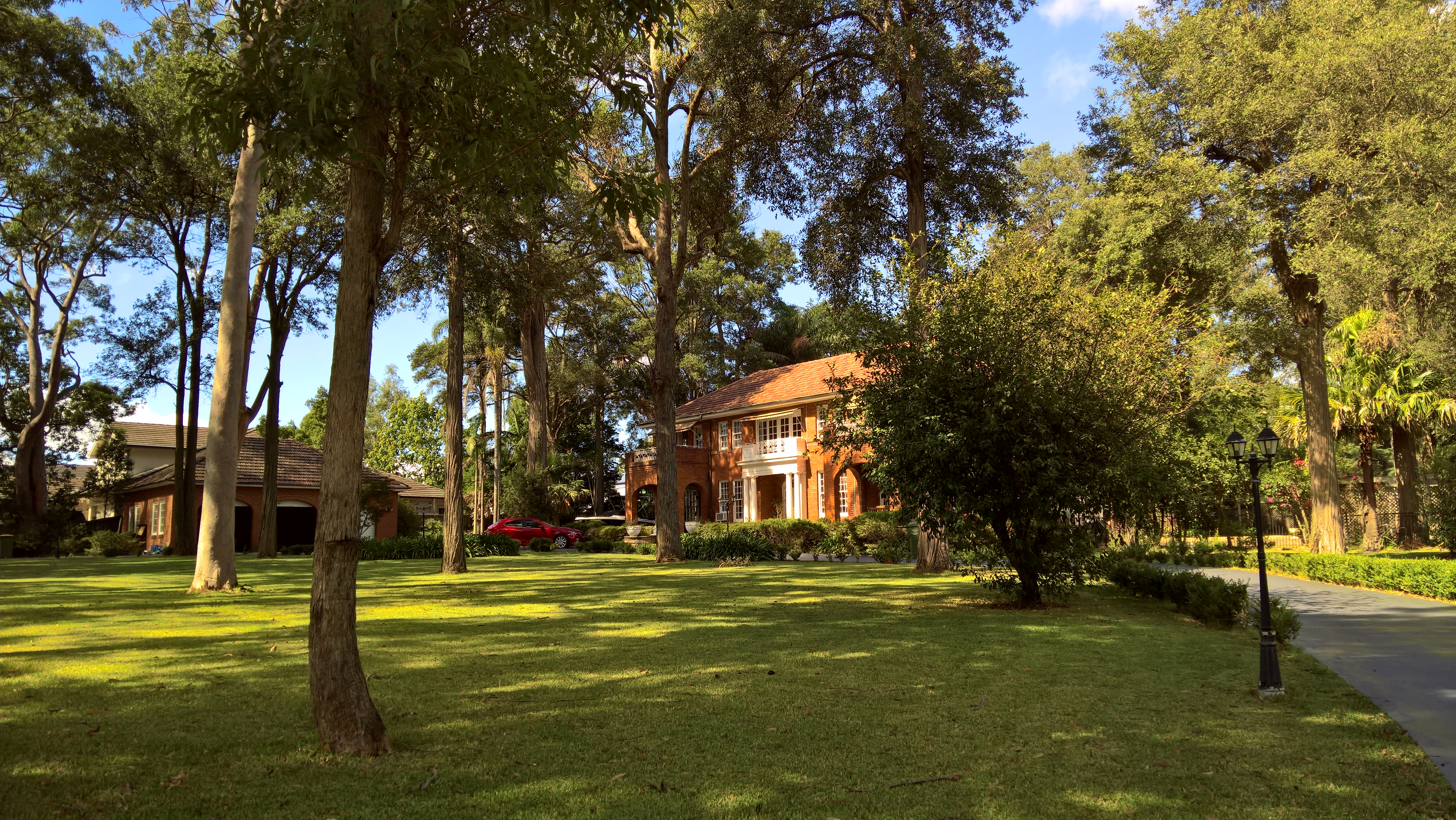
- Evatt House, 69 Junction Road, Wahroonga, NSW

- Location within Sydney Location within Australia
- 33°42′37″S 151°07′39″E
- Location: 69 Junction Road, Wahroonga, Ku-ring-gai Council, New South Wales, Australia

History
- Built: 1940
- Built for: Clive Raleigh Evatt and Marjorie Evatt

Site notes
- Architect: Stuart Traill
- Architectural style: Georgian Revival

New South Wales Heritage Register
- Official name: Evatt House; Parklands
- Type: State heritage (built)
- Designated: 24 September 2004
- Reference no.: 1711
- Type: House
- Category: Residential buildings (private)

Evatt House is a heritage-listed house located at 69 Junction Road in the Sydney suburb of Wahroonga, New South Wales, Australia. It is also known as Parklands. The property is privately owned. It was added to the New South Wales State Heritage Register on 24 September 2004.

== History ==
=== Indigenous history ===
Material in rock shelters reveals that Aboriginal people inhabited the surrounding region at least from the last ice age some 20,000 years ago. Several different languages and dialects were spoken in the Sydney Harbour area before the arrival of the First Fleet. "Kuringgai" was the language spoken on the north shores. When Europeans chose the south side of the harbour for the settlement of the First Fleet in 1788, they chose the territory of the Darug-speaking people, who inhabited the region from the southern shores of Sydney Harbour west to the Blue Mountains. Both the Darug and the Kuringgai groups suffered catastrophic loss of life in the smallpox epidemic that swept through the indigenous population in 1789, with a death rate estimated to have been between 50 per cent and 90 per cent. Over the following century there were numerous documentary recordings of the movements of surviving Kuringgai people within the Ku-Ring-Gai locality, both attending Aboriginal gatherings and collecting European rations such as blankets. There are also several oral history accounts of small clans travelling through the district in the late nineteenth century. In the 1950s at least a few local Aboriginal people were known to be still living within their traditional territory.

=== Early Europeans in the district ===
Before the railway (constructed late nineteenth century) and later the Sydney Harbour Bridge (opened 1932) made the north shore easily accessible, the Kur-Ring-Gai area was remote from Sydney Town and consisted mainly of isolated white rural communities earning their livelihood from agricultural activities such as timber-getting and market gardening. Wahroonga first experienced suburban development after the railway line from Hornsby to St Leonards was opened in 1890, when the first suburban roads were constructed followed by the first homes, built around 1896. The Shire of Ku-Ring-Gai was first constituted in 1906 with just six councillors, who took temporary offices in the grounds of St John's Church at Gordon.

=== Evatt House history of land ownership ===
The property was originally part of 810 hectares (2,000 acres) granted to John Terry Hughes in 1842. In the 1890s a consortium of businessmen (Smith Burns and Withers) acquired acreage in Wahroonga and sold off lots in Junction Road and Kintore Street that included this land. A small part of the Evatt House site formed part of a larger property facing Kintore Street at the back of Evatt House, known as Grantham, built by Christiana Hordern c. 1895. The land was further subdivided c. 1929. In 1937 three blocks were purchased by Clive Raleigh Evatt Snr (1900–1984; LL.B., Q.C., MLA for Hurstville 1939–1959), a prominent NSW Labor politician. With his wife Marjorie (née Marjorie Hannah Andreas, 1903–1984), Clive commissioned architect Stuart Traill to design a Georgian Revival house for the property, built in 1940. Daughters Elizabeth and Penelope remember that their mother was also particularly influential in the design of the house. There is no known landscape designer associated with the property. The decision to retain the native vegetation, rather than plant an English-style garden more typically associated with Georgian residences, was unusual and progressive for its time.

'Bush garden became a fashionable term after the publication of "Designing Australian Bush Gardens" (1966) by Betty Maloney and Jean Walker. They were not the first, however, to advocate a design approach exclusively using native plants. In the 1920s Walter and Marion Griffin encouraged those who moved into their new subdivision at Castlecrag to plant local species, and Edna Walling, in her book "The Australian Roadside" (1952), championed the retention of remnant roadside vegetation. Among the first publications to include garden plans featuring only Australian species, was "Australian Plants for the Garden" (1953) by Thistle Harris.'

'Recognition of the indigenous flora and its use in the vernacular, decorative and applied arts was characteristic of the federation period between 1890 and 1914, when Australia was searching for symbols of its new identity and independence. Strangely, all this artistic representation of Australia's native flora was not matched by interest in using it as a horticultural subject. It was another fifty years or so before the next wave of attention brought native plants into Australian suburban gardens in great numbers.'

=== The Evatt family and associates ===
Ken Cable's biographical sketch on Clive Raleigh Evatt explains that he was born in Maitland in 1900, the younger brother of the famous Labor politician and jurist, Herbert Vere Evatt (also known as H. V. Evatt or Doc Evatt). Clive's career was distinguished although 'it lacked the extraordinary achievement of his brother's'. After education at Fort Street Boys High, he entered the Royal Military College, Duntroon and graduated with a King's Medal in 1921. He enrolled in the Law Faculty at Sydney University and was a Kings Counsel barrister by 1935. In 1939 Clive Evatt was elected to NSW Parliament as Labor MP for Hurstville and his party led by W.J. McKell won the election in 1941. Evatt served as NSW Minister for Education, where he tried to introduce unpopular reforms such as banning corporal punishment in schools, but was more effective as Minister for Housing in the early years of large-scale public housing. Evatt was highly intelligent, personable and witty. An effective speaker, he nevertheless did not conform to the traditional Labor type. He was essentially a middle-class Protestant radical, as was his brother. The postwar years were a time of unease and tension for Evatt. He rapidly lost seniority in Cabinet, taking "bread and butter" portfolios. He left the Ministry of J. J. Cahill in 1954 and quit Parliament in 1959. Already he had returned to the bar, specialising with great success, in libel and personal injury cases. While inevitably living in the shadow of his famous brother, whom he held in great esteem, Clive Evatt was a man of talent and significance in his own right.

Cable remarks that with his qualifications and connections, Clive Raleigh Evatt was representative of a new generation of non-union, liberally minded men who stressed the need for Labor to appeal to a broad electorate. 'A patron of the Arts, he entertained widely in his Wahroonga home' which was frequented by significant artistic, academic, legal and Labor figures. John Gordon writes: 'Evatt, a colourful King's Counsel, a graduate of Duntroon Military Academy and younger brother of H. V. Evatt, showed himself to be a humanitarian reformer with a highly personalised style. Evatt was before his time anticipating the spirit of the early 1970s.'

Famous people associated with the household included Clive's brother H. V. Evatt, artist Sidney Nolan, actors Laurence Olivier and Vivien Leigh and numerous musicians and artists patronised by the Evatts. Michael Bogle notes that in the early 1950s as Minister for Housing, Clive Evatt overturned Willoughby Council's rejection of Seidler's design for Meller House in Castlecrag, authorising its construction as a demonstration home. Seidler has described his first visit to 69 Junction Road in 1950 as "momentous" and cites Evatt's support as persuasive in his decision to remain and work in Australia. This was some years before he married Evatt's youngest daughter, Pennelope. Nonetheless Harry Seidler's outstanding career was supported by the social connections forged through this prominent family, and initially at least, within this house.

Furthermore, the Evatt children who grew up in Evatt House are likely to be considered historically significant in their own right: Elizabeth Evatt, first woman Chief Justice of the Family Court; Penelope Seidler, an architect who married the noted architect, Harry Seidler in 1958; and Clive Evatt, well known as a Sydney art dealer. The prominent careers of all three siblings evidence a continuation and extension of the family's interests in the law and the arts within NSW.

The ownership of the property was passed to grown up off-spring of Clive and Marjorie Evatt in 1970, although both parents continued to live in the house until their deaths, a few months apart, in 1984. The house was sold out of the Evatt family by 1986. Minor alterations and renovations were carried out c. 1987 included installation of the clay tennis court on the western block and modifications to the semi-circular driveway and garaging on the eastern block.

== Description ==
The house is a palatial Georgian Revival residence in the Ku-ring-gai area, designed by architect Stuart Traill and built in 1940. The original gardens were probably laid out in the 1940s following the construction of the dwelling. The installation of the clay tennis court on the western block are believed to have been undertaken after the property was sold out of the Evatt family in 1986. Also dated to this time are modifications to the semi-circular driveway and garaging on the eastern block.

The site contains approximately one hundred trees of predominantly locally indigenous native species, some of which may have existed prior to European settlement of the area. There are a number of mature Angophora costata (Sydney red gums) and Syncarpia glomulifera (turpentines) as well as other locally indigenous tree species including Eucalyptus pilularis (blackbutt), Eucalyptus globoidea (white stringybark) and Eucalyptus resinifera (red mahogany). These are located randomly through the site and are unlikely to have been planted. These species are all locally indigenous and are representative of the original flora or the locality (for this soil type and aspect). Whilst some of the larger trees within the site may have existed prior to European settlement of the area and have some heritage significance for that reason, most appear to be relatively young trees in the order of 40 to 80 years old. These trees have probably regenerated since land was originally cleared. There is no remaining native understorey within the site. Two Monterey pines c. 1920s, may have been planted before the site was subdivided.

This property should also be associated with the "Clive Evatt Reserve", owned and managed by Ku-Ring-Gai Council, and located about five blocks from Evatt House on the corner of Eastern Road and Burns Road.

The house and gardens are both largely intact but have deteriorated somewhat in recent years. The Heritage Office has refused a recent application to remove about half the trees on the site.

== Heritage listing ==
As at 25 August 2004, Evatt House is of state significance on the basis of its historical associations with the prominent NSW Labor politician that consolidated the land, built the house and lived there for nearly half a century (1940–1986), Clive Raleigh Evatt. The Evatt children who grew up in this house are likely to be considered historically significant in their own right: Elizabeth Evatt, first Chief Justice of the Family Court; architect Penelope Seidler; and Clive Evatt Jnr, a noted Sydney art dealer. A patron of the arts, Clive R. Evatt entertained widely and the home was frequented by significant artistic, academic, legal and Labor figures. In 1950 as State Minister for Housing, Evatt intervened on behalf of the pioneering modernist architect Harry Seidler to allow the construction of Mellor House in Castlecrag. Seidler describes his first visit to Evatt House in 1950 as "momentous" and cites Evatt's support as persuasive in his decision to remain and work in Australia. The property is otherwise likely to be of local significance as a good example of a substantial Georgian Revival residence in the Ku-ring-gai area, designed by Stuart Traill, and still largely intact. The "bush garden" setting for Evatt House is also of significance for its early attempt to maintain the ambience of indigenous Australian vegetation within suburbia. When the bushland vegetation is seen in combination with the Georgian revival style of the house, the place clearly demonstrates the fostering of Australian cultural nationalism in the mid-twentieth century by the Evatt family.

Evatt House was listed on the New South Wales State Heritage Register on 24 September 2004 having satisfied the following criteria.

The place is important in demonstrating the course, or pattern, of cultural or natural history in New South Wales.

The bush garden setting for Evatt House is of significance as an early attempt to maintain an ambience of "native bushland" in Australian suburbia. The identification of Australian flora with the fostering of national identity is typical of progressive Australian cultural life.

The house is representative of C.R. Evatt as a new type of Labor politician who focused less upon working class values than upon the possibilities for social betterment, nationalist cultural development and human rights.

The property is of local significance as an example of a substantial upper middle class residence set within landscaped gardens that typified the suburban development of Wahroonga in the mid-twentieth century.

The place has a strong or special association with a person, or group of persons, of importance of cultural or natural history of New South Wales's history.

Evatt House is of State significance on the basis of its historical associations with the prominent family that consolidated the land, built the house and lived there over nearly half a century (1940–1986): Clive Raleigh Evatt and his wife Marjorie, and their children, Clive Evatt Jnr (a barrister and art dealer), Elizabeth Evatt (first woman Chief Justice of the Family Court) and Penelope Seidler (architect who married the internationally noted architect, Harry Seidler).

Evatt House is of significance in so far as its first owner, Clive Evatt, with his qualifications and connections was representative of a new generation of non-union, liberally minded Labor politicians who stressed the need for Labor to appeal to a broad electorate. A patron of the arts, Evatt entertained widely and his home was frequented by significant artistic, academic, legal and Labor figures.

Twentieth century neo-Georgian architecture had been associated with progressive or modernist architecture in Australian and Britain in the early twentieth century in its attempt to avoid eclecticism, although it later became synonymous with "upper middle class concepts of good taste" However Apperley et al. also point to the nationalist significance of the style as the first conscious architectural movement within Australia to revive the early Australian idiom of "Old Colonial Georgian", as popularised by William Hardy Wilson during the inter-war period. The fostering of the bush garden in association with a neo-Georgian styled house can be seen to be part of the Evatt's progressive, modernist patronage of Australian culture.

Famous people associated with the household included visitors such as Clive's brother "Doc" Evatt (a Federal Labor politician and the first Secretary-General of the then newly formed United Nations), artist Sidney Nolan, actors Laurence Olivier and Vivien Leigh and numerous musicians and artists patronised by the Evatts. The family's art collection included works by Australian modernists Donald Friend, Adrian Feint and Margaret Preston.

In 1950 as State Minister for Housing, Evatt intervened on behalf of the pioneering modernist architect Harry Seidler to allow the construction of Mellor House in Castlecrag. Seidler describes his first visit to Evatt House in 1950 as "momentous" and cites Evatt's support as persuasive in his decision to remain and work in Australia.

Parklands is thus strongly associated with twentieth century Australian modernist cultural practitioners as well as a prominent Australian political family.

The place is important in demonstrating aesthetic characteristics and/or a high degree of creative or technical achievement in New South Wales.

Evatt House is of local significance as a good example of a substantial Georgian Revival residence in the Ku-ring-gai area, still largely intact and sited impressively on a large block of land with mature stands of trees providing a stately setting for the house. It was designed by Stuart Traill and is considered to be in the Interwar Georgian Revival style. The house design is also of interest for the contributions from Evatt's wife Marjorie, his father-in-law E.P. Andreas and his sister-in-law Mary Alice Evatt (née Sheffer, who had studied architecture).

Unusually for the late 1930s, the Evatts did not clear the grounds and design an English-style garden, but kept the indigenous trees, and planted some exotic species around the site. Although no known landscape designer is associated with the property, the garden is of significance as an early example of a "bush garden" in Sydney suburbia.

The place has a strong or special association with a particular community or cultural group in New South Wales for social, cultural or spiritual reasons.

Evatt House is of significance in so far as its first owner, Clive Evatt, with his qualifications and connections was representative of a new generation of non-union, liberally minded Labor politicians who stressed the need for Labor to appeal to a broad electorate. A patron of the arts, Evatt entertained widely and his home was frequented by significant artistic, academic, legal and Labor figures.

Twentieth century neo-Georgian architecture had been associated with progressive or modernist architecture in Australian and Britain in the early twentieth century in its attempt to avoid eclecticism, although it later became synonymous with "upper middle class concepts of good taste". However Apperley et al. also point to the nationalist significance of the style as the first conscious architectural movement within Australia to revive an early Australian idiom. The fostering of the bush garden in association with a neo-Georgian styled house can be seen to be part of the Evatt's progressive, modernist patronage of Australian culture.

The place has potential to yield information that will contribute to an understanding of the cultural or natural history of New South Wales.

Nil.

The place possesses uncommon, rare or endangered aspects of the cultural or natural history of New South Wales.

Comparative analyses of the house with other Georgian Revival residences in Ku-Ring-Gai suggest that Evatt House is not a rare example of the genre.

The place is important in demonstrating the principal characteristics of a class of cultural or natural places/environments in New South Wales.

Nil.

== See also ==
- Australian residential architectural styles
