= Christine Wheeler =

Australian judge

The Honourable Christine Ann Wheeler AO KC

Judge of the Supreme Court of Western Australia
- In office 30 October 1996 – 25 February 2010

Personal details
- Born: 16 January 1954 (age 72) Sydney, New South Wales, Australia
- Education: University of Western Australia; London School of Economics
- Occupation: Judge, lawyer

Christine Ann Wheeler AO KC (born 16 January 1954 in Sydney) is a former judge in the Supreme Court of Western Australia, from 1996 to 2005. From 2005 to 2010, she was an inaugural judge of the Court of Appeal. She retired from the Supreme Court on 25 February 2010.

== Early life and education ==
Wheeler was educated at Kent Street Senior High School in Perth, and graduated from the University of Western Australia in 1975 with a Bachelor of Jurisprudence. She studied for a Master of Laws at the London School of Economics, before returning to Perth to complete her Bachelor of Laws in 1980.

== Career ==
She served as an Assistant Crown Solicitor from 1984 to 1988, heading the Policy and Law Reform Unit. From 1988 to 1994 she held the positions of Senior Assistant Crown Solicitor and Senior Assistant Crown Counsel. In 1994 Wheeler was a part-time Judicial Registrar of the Industrial Relations Court of Australia.

She took silk in 1994, becoming the first woman in Western Australia to be appointed as a Queen's Counsel. She sat as a Commissioner in the District and Supreme Courts of Western Australia in 1995 and 1996.

=== Supreme Court ===
Wheeler was appointed to the bench on 30 October 1996, becoming the first female Justice of the Supreme Court of Western Australia.

In 2003 Justice Wheeler was one of the three judges of the Court of Criminal Appeal of the Supreme Court of Western Australia who took just ten days to reject the appeal of Andrew Mallard, who had been convicted of murder. In 2005 the High Court of Australia set aside this decision.

In 2005 Justice Wheeler was made a judge in the Supreme Court's Appellate Court.

Outside law, Wheeler was Pro-Chancellor of the University of Western Australia from 2001 to 2005.

She was made an Officer of the Order of Australia in the 2013 Australia Day Honours.

== See also ==
- First women lawyers around the world
