= Elizabeth Bolton =

Australian magistrate (born 1950)

- Born: Elizabeth Mary Bolton; 1950 (age 75–76)
- Education: University of Adelaide
- Occupations: Lawyer, judge

Elizabeth Mary Bolton (born 1950) is a retired Australian lawyer, judge and magistrate. She was appointed South Australian Chief Magistrate in 2007, becoming the first woman to head a court jurisdiction in the state.

== Life ==
Bolton studied English literature at the University of Adelaide, followed by law at the university's law school. She began practicing as a lawyer in 1985. She served as a prosecutor with the South Australian Department of Public Prosecutions, and then with the Commonwealth Department of Public Prosecutions. In December 1999 she was appointed to the position of magistrate. In 2004 she was appointed the regional manager at the Christies Beach Magistrates Court.

In 2007, Bolton was appointed South Australian Chief Magistrate becoming the first woman to head a court jurisdiction in the state. Bolton resigned from the position in July 2015 citing health issues.
