= Family Court of Australia attacks =

Series of shootings and bombings from 1980 to 1985

The Family Court of Australia attacks were a series of shootings and bombings in New South Wales, Australia from 1980 to 1985. They targeted judges and other people associated with the Family Court of Australia. Two people were shot dead, two killed by bombs, a court building was damaged by a bomb, and another bomb was found attached to a motor vehicle. In July 2015, Leonard John Warwick was arrested and charged with multiple offences, including four counts of murder, one of attempted murder, and 13 counts of burning or maiming with an explosive substance. In July 2020, Warwick was found guilty of the majority of the offences he was charged with, including three of the murders. He was found not guilty of the murder of Stephen Blanchard, his brother-in-law. Warwick died in prison on 14 February 2025.

== Attacks ==
The attacks are considered to have begun on 22 February 1980, when Stephen Blanchard was shot dead in his home. His body was found six days later on the opposite side of Sydney in Cowan Creek on the Hawkesbury River. No one has been found guilty of Blanchard's shooting, though convictions were made for the three subsequent related murders.

On 23 June 1980, Family Court judge David Opas was shot outside his home. He died later that night in hospital.

On 6 March 1984, judge Richard Gee, who had taken on Opas' cases after his death, was injured by a bomb at his Belrose home. On 14 April 1984, the Family Court building in Parramatta was bombed without any injuries.

On 4 July 1984, Pearl Watson, the wife of Family Court judge Ray Watson, became the first fatality of the bombing campaign when she opened the door of their unit in Greenwich, triggering an improvised explosive device on the doorstep. Judge Watson is believed to have been the target but was only injured. Like Richard Gee, Watson had taken on some Family Court cases from his predecessor after Gee had been injured in the March 1984 bombing.

Then, on 21 July 1985, Graham Wykes, a Jehovah's Witness minister was killed and another 13 people injured when their Casula Kingdom Hall was bombed.

Also in 1985, an unexploded bomb was found in Northmead under the bonnet of a car. The address was formerly that of a solicitor who acted for a woman in a Family Court case. His name was still listed at that address in the phone book.

The attacks were once considered an unsolved mystery of Australian crime. In 1984, a A$500,000 reward was offered for information but was never claimed.

== Investigations ==
There were two coronial inquests into the attacks. The first was held in 1986 at Glebe Coroner's Court investigating the death of Graham Wykes. The second was held in 1987 by Kevin Waller into the death of Pearl Watson. Waller recorded an open verdict, expressing frustration and disappointment that insufficient evidence had been found to charge the main suspect who had been connected in some way to all of the victims.

In 2012, the State Crime Command's homicide squad restarted an investigation into the crimes.

== Trial and sentencing of Leonard Warwick ==
On 29 July 2015, 68-year-old Leonard John Warwick, the brother-in-law of the first victim Stephen Blanchard, was arrested at Campbelltown, New South Wales. He was charged with 32 offences, including four counts of murder, one of attempted murder, and 13 counts of burning or maiming with an explosive substance.

Warwick appeared in Campbelltown Local Court on 30 July 2015. The case was adjourned to 6 August at Central Local Court. At the August hearing, he did not appear and did not apply for bail. Bail was formally refused and he was held until the next hearing in October.

Warwick had been a "person of interest" in the original investigation. Warwick was remanded in custody until 10 February 2017. Warwick pleaded not guilty to all charges on 2 March 2017, and the judge, Justice Garling, set a trial date of February 2018. The trial commenced in May 2018 before Justice Garling without a jury. There were several delays and adjournments to proceedings, with Warwick having no money for legal representation in February 2019 and his legal aid representatives withdrawing from the case in June 2019 after Warwick claimed his public defender had "bullied" him.

Warwick's 23-month trial was concluded on 6 April 2020, with the verdict pending. Justice Garling noted, "I can inform the parties that it will take a considerable period of time." On 23 July 2020, Warwick was found guilty of all offences for which he was charged, except for the shooting of his brother-in-law Stephen Blanchard.

On 3 September 2020, Leonard Warwick was sentenced to life in prison without the possibility of parole. During sentencing proceedings, Supreme Court Justice Peter Garling said that Warwick's crimes "cannot be viewed as anything other than an attack on the very foundations of Australian democracy". Warwick died in prison on 14 February 2025.

== Media ==
The case was covered by Casefile True Crime Podcast on 2 April 2016.
