= Patsy Wolfe =

Australian lawyer and judge

Patricia (Patsy) Mary Wolfe (née Josephson) AO is a retired Australian lawyer and judge. She was Chief Judge of the District Court of Queensland between 1999 and 2014, the first woman to hold the position.

== Biography ==
Wolfe initially studied medicine, although did not complete a degree, and also worked as a journalist at The Courier-Mail newspaper in Brisbane. She married, and while raising four children, attended the University of Queensland, completing a Bachelor of Arts in 1974, a bachelor of law in 1978, and a master of law in 1983. In 1978 she was admitted to the Bar and in the following year joined the university's Faculty of Law as a senior tutor while also studying for her master's degree. In 1988-89 she served as deputy commissioner of the Fitzgerald Inquiry into police corruption, and was also a commissioner on the Human Rights and Equal Opportunity Commission from 1993 to 95. In 1992 she was chair of the Queensland Women's Consultative Committee.

In 1995 she was appointed to the District Court of Queensland, and in 1999 she became Chief Judge of the District Court as well as a judge in the Planning and Environment Court.

In 2014 Wolfe was appointed an Officer of the Order of Australia for her service to the judiciary and to the law and as a mentor for women. She retired from her position as judge the same year.
