= David Opas =

Australian judge

- Born: David Louis Opas; 30 June 1936; Waverley, Sydney, Australia
- Died: 23 June 1980 (aged 43); St Vincent's Hospital, Darlinghurst, Australia
- Occupation: Judge

David Louis Opas (30 June 1936 – 23 June 1980) was a judge of the Family Court of Australia. He was shot and killed during a period when a series of related gun and bomb attacks, killing three more people, were carried out against judges and other people connected to the Family Court.

== Private life ==
Opas was born on 30 June 1936 at Waverley, Sydney. His father Maurice was a commercial traveller, and his mother was Bessie (née Hart). Maurice was working as a canteen manager on HMAS Sydney (D48), and died when the ship was sunk in 1941. Opas was educated at Sydney Grammar School from 1947 to 1953 as a Legacy ward.

Opas married Kristin Mary Bisset (née Deck), a 29-year-old divorced assistant-pharmacist, on 17 December 1970 in Sydney. They had two children, a son and daughter.

== Legal career ==
Opas worked as an articled clerk with solicitors Pike & Pike while he studied part-time at the University of Sydney and passed the Barristers' Admission Board examinations. He was admitted to the New South Wales Bar on 26 July 1963.

Opas was appointed as a judge to the Family Court of Australia on 27 October 1977.

== Death ==
Opas was shot outside his home in Woollahra on the night of 23 June 1980, and died later that night in St Vincent's Hospital, Darlinghurst. Opas was buried with Jewish rites in Rookwood Cemetery, Sydney.

On 29 July 2015 68-year-old Leonard John Warwick was arrested by detectives at Campbelltown, New South Wales over the shooting murder of Opas, bomb death of Pearl Watson, wife of Judge Ray Watson, two other murders, one by gunshot, and bomb attacks from 1980 to 1985, all related to the Family Court of Australia.

On 23 July 2020, Warwick was found guilty of the murder of Opas, and two of three other murders. He was also found guilty of numerous other offences, but not guilty of one shooting. Warwick was sentenced to life in jail without parole in September 2020 and died in prison on 14 February 2025.
