= Will Alstergren =

Australian jurist

The Honourable Chief Justice Will Alstergren AO

5th Chief Justice of the Family Court of Australia
- Incumbent
- Assumed office 10 December 2018
- Nominated by: Scott Morrison
- Appointed by: Peter Cosgrove
- Preceded by: John Pascoe

3rd Chief Judge of the Federal Circuit Court of Australia
- Incumbent
- Assumed office 13 October 2017
- Nominated by: Malcolm Turnbull
- Appointed by: Peter Cosgrove
- Preceded by: John Pascoe

Personal details
- Born: Edvard William Alstergren; 12 April 1962 (age 64)
- Spouse: Kate
- Children: 3
- Education: University of Melbourne
- Occupation: Jurist; barrister

Edvard William Alstergren AO (born 12 April 1962), commonly known as Will Alstergren, is an Australian jurist who has held the positions of Chief Justice of the Family Court of Australia since 10 December 2018, and Chief Judge of the Federal Circuit Court of Australia since 13 October 2017.

Alstergren attended Geelong Grammar School, Scotch College, Melbourne and Melbourne Grammar School. He graduated with Bachelor of Arts and a Bachelor of Laws degrees from the University of Melbourne in 1991, where he resided at Trinity College and later completed a Master of Laws in 2010. He commenced practising as a barrister in Melbourne in 1991, specialising in commercial law, tax law, industrial law and family law, and was appointed Queen's Counsel in 2012. In 2013 he was Chairman of the Victorian Bar Association, and in 2017 was the Chairman of the Australian Bar Association.

On 13 October 2017, Alstergren was appointed as the Chief Judge of the Federal Circuit Court of Australia, replacing John Pascoe (who was appointed as Chief Justice of the Family Court of Australia). Alstergren was given a concurrent commission as a Justice of the Family Court of Australia.

When Pascoe reached the statutory retirement age from the Family Court a year later, Alstergren was appointed to succeed him as Chief Justice of the Family Court, effective from 10 December 2018. He retained his appointment as Chief Judge of the Federal Circuit Court amongst a Government plan to merge both courts. Robert McClelland was appointed as Deputy Chief Justice at the same time.

== Bobsleigh career ==
Alstergren was the captain of the Australian bobsled team in 2002. His team met the International Olympic Committee qualifying standards for the 2002 Winter Olympics, but the Australian Olympic Committee used higher standards and did not send them to compete. Alstergren said "We also beat half the teams currently in Salt Lake City, but unfortunately we couldn't meet the very high standard of the AOC".

== Honours ==
In 2022, Alstergren was appointed as an Officer of the Order of Australia for "distinguished service to the judiciary and to the law, and to sport as an administrator, coach and athlete".

Legal offices
| Preceded by John Pascoe | Chief Justice of the Family Court of Australia; 2018–present | Incumbent |
| Preceded by John Pascoe | Chief Judge of the Federal Circuit Court of Australia; 2017–present | Incumbent |
