= Harold Glass =

Australian judge and Royal Australian Navy admiral

Rear Admiral the Honourable Justice Harold H. Glass AO, RFD, QC

President of the New South Wales Bar Association
- In office 1973–1973

Judge of the New South Wales Supreme Court
- In office 1973–1974

Judge of the New South Wales Court of Appeal
- In office 1974–1987

Judge Advocate General for Royal Australian Navy
- In office 1978–1983

Personal details
- Born: 21 August 1918 New South Wales, Australia
- Died: 29 March 1989 (aged 70)
- Spouse: Irma Glass
- Children: Arthur, Jon
- Occupation: Judge, Jurist

Military service
- Allegiance: Australia
- Branch/service: Royal Australian Navy
- Years of service: 1942–1946; 1966–1983
- Rank: Rear Admiral
- Battles/wars: Second World War
- Awards: Officer of the Order of Australia; Reserve Force Decoration

Rear Admiral Harold Hyam Glass AO, RFD, QC (21 August 1918 – 29 March 1989) was an Australian judge and naval officer. He served on the Supreme Court of New South Wales, the New South Wales Court of Appeal and was Judge Advocate General for the Royal Australian Navy (RAN).

== Early life and military service ==
Glass was born in Sydney on 21 August 1918, the son of lawyer S. B. Glass. He excelled as a student of Sydney Boys High School (1930–34), and on completion of his secondary studies took an Arts Degree at the University of Sydney, majoring in French and German. During his time at the University of Sydney, he shared the medal in philosophy with the eminent twentieth century philosopher John Leslie Mackie. He joined the Royal Australian Naval Volunteer Reserve in 1942, serving aboard the cruisers Shropshire and Australia, and the American ship USS Waratah. Glass left the RAN in 1946 with the rank of lieutenant.

== Legal career ==
Returning to Sydney after the end of the Second World War, Glass took his Bachelor of Laws degree at the University of Sydney, and articled at Lieberman & Tobias for two years before being admitted to the New South Wales Bar in 1948. He practised at the bar until his appointment to the bench at the Supreme Court of New South Wales in 1973, taking silk in 1962, and sitting as President of the New South Wales Bar Association in 1973. He was appointed a Judge of Appeal in 1974, a position he retained until 1987.

== Naval career ==
Glass rejoined the RAN in 1966 as a commander Special Branch, Australian Royal Navy Reserve (ARNR) as a member of the Reserve Legal Panel. In 1969, Glass served as Australia's leading counsel in the joint RAN-United States Navy Board of Inquiry following the collision between the Australian aircraft carrier HMAS Melbourne and the American destroyer USS Frank E. Evans. Glass was promoted to the rank of captain in 1963. He was appointed to the office of Judge Advocate-General in 1978, and was promoted to rear admiral in 1980, shortly before he was placed on the retired list. He continued to serve as the Judge Advocate-General for the Navy until 1983.

== Academic and other work ==
Glass lectured in contracts and torts at the University of Sydney soon after he graduated, and later he lectured in procedure. After he retired, he became a visiting professor at the University of New South Wales. He was the co-author of The Liability of Employers, described by the NSW Bar Association's Bar News as "one of the few really first rate Australian legal treatises", and the editor of the Essays on Evidence. In addition, he contributed articles to the leading legal journals.

Glass also, under the pen name Benjamin Sidney, published two works of legal fiction, Discord Within The Bar in 1981, and Sherman for the Plaintiff in 1987. The Harold H. Glass Memorial Prize was established at the University of Western Australia to honour the memory of Glass, and is awarded each year to the most able student in the subject of Torts.

Glass died on 29 March 1989, in Sydney. At his funeral, Rabbi Raymond Apple of the Great Synagogue, Sydney, described him as a "quintessential judge, learned lawyer, loyal Australian, faithful Jew, broadminded human being, cultured citizen of the world."
