= John Pascoe =

Australian judge

The Honourable John Pascoe AC, CVO

4th Chief Justice of the Family Court of Australia
- In office 13 October 2017 – 9 December 2018
- Preceded by: Diana Bryant
- Succeeded by: Will Alstergren

2nd Chief Federal Magistrate / Chief Judge of the Federal Circuit Court of Australia
- In office 14 July 2004 – 12 October 2017
- Preceded by: Diana Bryant
- Succeeded by: Will Alstergren

Personal details
- Born: 10 December 1948 (age 77) Adelaide, South Australia
- Spouse: Jane Pascoe
- Children: Rod, Camilla and Cameron
- Education: Australian National University
- Occupation: Judge; former company director
- Known for: Chief Judge, Federal Circuit Court of Australia, CEO and Chairman of George Weston Foods

John Henry Pascoe AC, CVO (born 10 December 1948) is a former Chief Justice of the Family Court of Australia and Deputy Chancellor of the University of New South Wales.

== Background and career ==
Pascoe was raised in Broken Hill and Menindee, the only child of a grazier and a mother with interests in the mining industry. He studied Asian languages and philosophy at the Australian National University, graduating with a Bachelor of Arts in 1969 and Bachelor of Laws (Honours) in 1971.

Prior to his appointment to the bench, Pascoe was the chairman and CEO of George Weston Foods, chairman of Centrelink, deputy chairman of Aristocrat Leisure and managing director of the insurance and risk management division of Phillips Fox. He has also held positions on several other corporate boards, such as Qantas. Pascoe was a member of the board of directors (1998–2006) of the International Award Foundation (which operates the Duke of Edinburgh's International Award and national chair (1995–2004 of the Duke of Edinburgh's International Award – Australia) and in 2016 he was awarded a Gold Distinguished Service Medal. Previously he has held positions on the boards of the Cancer Council of New South Wales, the Sydney Opera House Trust, and the Royal Alexandra Hospital for Children.

Pascoe's appointment as Chief Judge has been widely applauded as a result of the significant management skills that he has brought to the Federal Circuit Court of Australia, which continues to be the most rapidly expanding court in Australia. The Federal Circuit Court is the largest federal court in Australia. In December 2015, Pascoe was appointed as the Australian delegate to The Hague working group considering an international surrogacy convention.

== Community ==
John was appointed (1995–2004) as National Chair of the Duke of Edinburgh's International Award – Australia and as an International Trustee of the Award from 1998 to 2006.

== Honours ==
In 2002 Pascoe was appointed an Officer of the Order of Australia for service to business and commerce, to children's health, particularly the needs and rights of patients and their families, to the Children's Hospital at Westmead, and to youth training, nationally and internationally, through the Duke of Edinburgh's Award Scheme. Pascoe was appointed Commander of the Royal Victorian Order (CVO) in the 2010 New Year Honours for his services to the Duke of Edinburgh's International Award and in January 2016 was appointed a Companion of the Order of Australia for eminent service to the law and to the judiciary, through support for improved access to the justice system for Indigenous peoples, to legal administration and higher education, and as an advocate for the prevention of international trafficking of children.

Legal offices
Preceded by Diana Bryant	Chief Justice of the Family Court of Australia; 2017–2018	Succeeded by Will Alstergren
Preceded by Diana Bryant	Chief Federal Magistrate; Chief Judge of the Federal Circuit Court of Australia; 2004–2017	Succeeded by Will Alstergren
