= Diana Bryant =

Australian judge

The Honourable Diana Bryant AO KC

3rd Chief Justice of the Family Court of Australia
- In office 5 July 2004 – 12 October 2017
- Preceded by: Alastair Nicholson
- Succeeded by: John Pascoe

1st Chief Federal Magistrate
- In office 11 May 2000 – 4 July 2004
- Preceded by: New title
- Succeeded by: John Pascoe

Personal details
- Born: 13 October 1947 (age 79)
- Education: Firbank Girls' Grammar School; Melbourne University; Monash University
- Occupation: Judge, Lawyer

Diana Bryant AO KC (born 13 October 1947) is an Australian jurist who served as Chief Justice of the Family Court of Australia from 5 July 2004 to 12 October 2017.

== Early life and education ==
Bryant was born in Perth, Western Australia and attended Firbank Girls' Grammar School in Melbourne. Bryant holds a Bachelor of Laws degree from Melbourne University, and a Master of Laws degree from Monash University.

== Career ==
Bryant was admitted as a legal practitioner in Victoria in 1970. From 1977 to 1990, Chief Justice Bryant was a partner with the firm of Phillips Fox in Perth where she practised as a solicitor and counsel specialising in family law. She was also a Director of Australian Airlines from 1984 to 1989.

From May 2000, she was the inaugural Chief Federal Magistrate of Australia, the head of the Federal Magistrates' Court, thus being the first woman appointed to the position.

Prior to her appointment, Chief Justice Bryant had practised at the Victorian Bar from 1990 where she specialised in family law and de facto property disputes, particularly at the appellate level. She was appointed a Queen's Counsel in 1997 and was a founding member of Chancery Chambers, Melbourne.

In February 2009, Chief Justice Bryant was appointed Patron of Australian Women Lawyers, after founding Patron Mary Gaudron QC, in recognition of her support for women lawyers and efforts to promote equality of opportunity for women in the community.

Bryant retired as Chief Justice on 12 October 2017 reaching the constitutional retirement age of 70.

== Honours ==
In 2012, Bryant was made an Officer of the Order of Australia for,

distinguished service to the judiciary and to the law, particularly to family law policy reform and practice, through the establishment of the Federal Magistrates Court, and to the advancement of women in the legal profession [...].

She was inducted into the Western Australian Women's Hall of Fame in 2018.

Legal offices
Preceded by Alastair Nicholson	Chief Justice of the Family Court of Australia; 2004–2017	Succeeded by John Pascoe
New title	Chief Federal Magistrate; 2000–2004	Succeeded by John Pascoe
