= Federal Circuit and Family Court of Australia =

Australian federal court handling family law matters

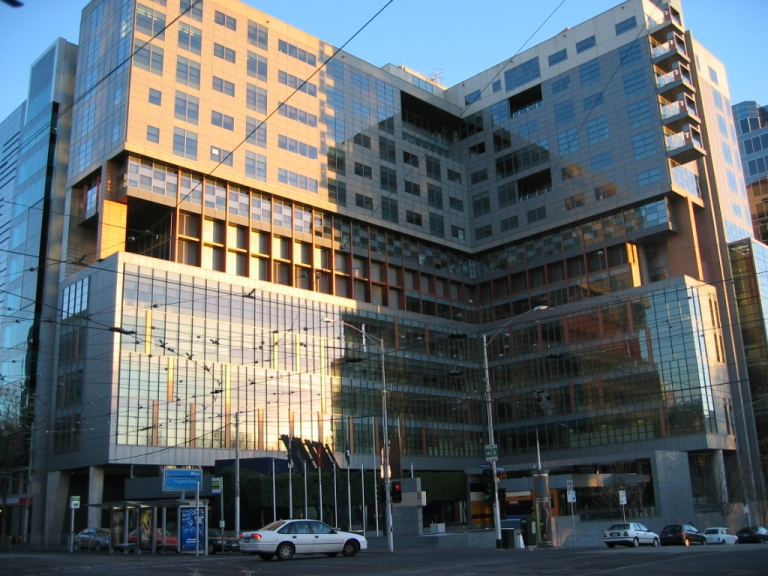
- The Melbourne division of the Federal Circuit and Family Court of Australia is housed in the Commonwealth Law Courts Building on the corner of La Trobe Street and William Street
- Established: 1 September 2021
- Jurisdiction: Australia
- Appeals to: High Court of Australia
- Judge term length: Until 70 years of age
- Website: www.fcfcoa.gov.au

Chief Justice
- Currently: Will Alstergren
- Since: 10 December 2018

Deputy Chief Justice of Division 1; Deputy Chief Judge (Family Law) of Division 2
- Currently: Robert McClelland
- Since: 16 June 2015 (Division 1); 17 September 2021 (Division 2)

Deputy Chief Judge (General and Fair Work) of Division 2
- Currently: Patrizia Mercuri
- Since: 17 September 2021

The Federal Circuit and Family Court of Australia is an Australian court formed in September 2021 from the merger of the Federal Circuit Court of Australia and the Family Court of Australia. It has jurisdiction over family law in Australia, apart from in Western Australia, as well as various other areas of law such as bankruptcy, copyright, human rights, and industrial law.

== History ==
In November 2020, the Morrison government announced that they planned to merge the Federal Circuit Court of Australia and the Family Court of Australia.

The merger had been widely opposed by the opposition, crossbench and the legal profession since the announcement in November 2020. In February 2021, 157 lawyers signed an open letter to the Attorney-General, stating that the merge would "result in a loss of structural, systemic specialisation and dismantle the appeal division". Family law experts also claimed that "survivors of domestic violence could end up falling through the cracks". Independent MP and former barrister Zali Steggall noted that the merger would lose the "specialisation of the Family Court".

In March 2021, the parliament passed the Federal Circuit and Family Court of Australia Act 2021 to merge both courts, which took effect on 1 September 2021.

== Jurisdiction ==
The Federal Circuit and Family Court of Australia has jurisdiction over family law matters, such as divorce applications, parenting disputes, and the division of property when a couple separate; Western Australia maintains a separate family court. It also has jurisdiction over matters broadly relating to family law and child support, administrative law, admiralty law, bankruptcy, copyright, human rights, industrial law, migration, privacy and trade practices.

== Structure ==
The Federal Circuit and Family Court of Australia is split into two divisions:

- Division 1 is the former Family Court of Australia and is a superior court of record for dealing with family law matters. It contains 35 judges.
- Division 2 is the former Federal Circuit Court of Australia, and deals with the bulk of family law matters prior to the establishment of the Court, as well as general federal law matters such as migration, bankruptcy and admiralty. It contains 76 judges.

The Court operates under the leadership of one Chief Justice, supported by one Deputy Chief Justice, currently Will Alstergren and Robert McClelland as of September 2021. They each hold a dual commission to both Divisions of the Court. A second Deputy Chief Judge, currently Patrizia Mercuri as of September 2021, assists in the management of the general federal law and Fair Work jurisdictions of Division 2.

== Indigenous List ==
The Federal Circuit and Family Court of Australia operates an "Indigenous List", in which modified processes catering to Aboriginal and Torres Strait Islander people and culture are employed. These are run in six locations: Adelaide, Alice Springs, Brisbane, Darwin, Melbourne, and Sydney.
