= Elizabeth Evatt =

Australian judge (born 1933)

Elizabeth Andreas Evatt AC

1st Chief Justice of the Family Court of Australia
- In office 5 January 1976 – 5 January 1988

Personal details
- Born: 11 November 1933 (age 93)
- Relations: Harry Andreas (grandfather); H. V. Evatt (uncle); Penelope Seidler (sister); Clive Evatt Jnr (brother)
- Parent: Clive Evatt QC
- Education: University of Sydney; Harvard University
- Occupation: Reformist lawyer and jurist
- Known for: First Chief Justice of the Family Court of Australia

Elizabeth Andreas Evatt (born 11 November 1933) is an eminent Australian reformist lawyer and jurist who sat on numerous national and international tribunals and commissions, was the first Chief Justice of the Family Court of Australia, the first female judge of an Australian federal court, and the first Australian to be elected to the United Nations Human Rights Committee.

== Early years and background ==
Evatt was born in 1933, the daughter of the barrister Clive Evatt QC, granddaughter of Harry Andreas of Leuralla, and the niece of H. V. Evatt. Educated at the Presbyterian Ladies' College in Pymble, Sydney, Evatt studied law at the University of Sydney, as the youngest law student ever accepted, and became the first female student to win the University's Medal for Law, graduating in March 1955. Admitted as at barrister in New South Wales in 1955, Evatt won a scholarship to Harvard University where she was awarded an LLM in 1956 and was admitted to the bar at the Inner Temple in London, United Kingdom. From 1968 to 1973, Evatt worked at the England and Wales Law Commission under Lord Scarman.

== Judicial appointments ==
=== Australia ===
In December 1972, Evatt was appointed as the first female Deputy President of the Commonwealth Conciliation and Arbitration Commission and retained this position until 1989. Between 1974 and 1977, Evatt chaired the Royal Commission on Human Relationships. The Family Law Act 1975 established the Family Court of Australia, and Evatt was appointed as its inaugural Chief Justice holding this position from 1976 until 1988.

In 1988 Evatt was appointed President of the Australian Law Reform Commission, a position she held until 1993. From 1995 to 1998, she served as a part-time Commissioner of the Australian Human Rights and Equal Opportunity Commission.

=== International ===
Appointed as a member of the United Nations Committee on the Elimination of Discrimination against Women in 1984, Evatt later chaired the committee, from 1989 to 1991, and remained a member until 1992. Evatt was the first Australian to be elected to the United Nations Human Rights Committee in 1992, serving as a member from 1993 to 2000.

Between 1998 and 2007, Evatt served two consecutive, five-year terms as a judge of a tribunal of the World Bank that determines staffing disputes. Evatt was elected as a Commissioner of the International Committee of Jurists in April 2003.

== Non-judicial appointments ==
In 1988 Evatt was made Chancellor of the University of Newcastle, holding this post until 1994.

In 1995 Evatt was commissioned by Robert Tickner, the Minister for Aboriginal and Torres Strait Islander Affairs, to review the Aboriginal and Torres Strait Islander Heritage Protection Act 1984. Her extensive report, Review of the Aboriginal and Torres Strait Islander Heritage Protection Act 1984 ('the Evatt Review') was presented in August 1996 and has been influential in reform proposals in this controversial area of law.

== Human rights advocate ==
Evatt has been an outspoken advocate of issues relating to human rights in Australia, particularly women's rights. In a 2004 speech to mark the twentieth anniversary of the Sex Discrimination Act 1984, Evatt critiqued the Act and other laws relating to women's rights in Australia, in terms of its inadequacies in satisfying Australia's obligations under the Convention on the Elimination of All Forms of Discrimination Against Women. She was also critical of the then Howard Liberal government's anti-terrorism legislation, particularly provisions relating to control orders and preventive detention, saying that "These laws are striking at the most fundamental freedoms in our democracy in a most draconian way."

Evatt was a signatory to the Yogyakarta Principles in November 2006.

== Awards and honours ==
Evatt was made an Officer of the Order of Australia on 14 June 1982, in recognition of services to the law, and was granted the status of Companion of the Order of Australia, at the Queen's Birthday honours on 12 June 1995. The latter citation was awarded "in recognition of service to the law, social justice and to the promotion of human rights worldwide, particularly in the areas of equal opportunity and anti-discrimination legislation and practice".

In 1985 an honorary degree of LL.D was conferred on Evatt by the University of Sydney at a special ceremony which celebrated the centenary of the first graduations by women at the university. In 1994, the Flinders University of South Australia conferred the same award on Evatt.

In 2007 the Blue Mountains Community Legal Centre changed its name to the Elizabeth Evatt Community Legal Centre. The Centre provides free legal advice to clients in the surrounding region, and Evatt serves as patron of the centre.

Evatt is a Life Member of the Evatt Foundation, an organisation established as a memorial to her uncle, Dr H. V. Evatt, with the aim of advancing the highest ideals of the labour movement, such as equality, participation, social justice and human rights. Evatt served as Vice-President of the Foundation between 1982 and 1987.

She was added to the Victorian Honour Roll of Women in 2001.

== Notable published works ==
- Evatt, Elizabeth (1987). "Recollections". In Curthoys, Ann; Martin, A.W.; Rowse, Tim (eds.). Australians from 1939 (2nd ed.). Sydney: Fairfax, Syme & Weldon Associates. p. 474. ISBN 0-949288-23-3.
- Evatt, Elizabeth (19 July 1991). New South Wales Women's Advisory Council (ed.). Valuing women's work: women, equality and family law reform (Lecture). Anne Conlon memorial lecture. Haymarket, Sydney.
- Evatt, Elizabeth, ed. (1991). A Guide to family law: questions and answers to help you make the right decisions. Sydney: Bay Books. p. 176. ISBN 1-86378-040-8.

== See also ==
- Evatt House

Legal offices
New title	Chief Justice of the Family Court of Australia; 1976–1988	Succeeded by Alastair Nicholson
Academic offices
Preceded by Sir Bede Callaghan	Chancellor of the University of Newcastle; 1988–1994	Succeeded by Ric Charlton
