= Family Court of Western Australia =

Australian state court

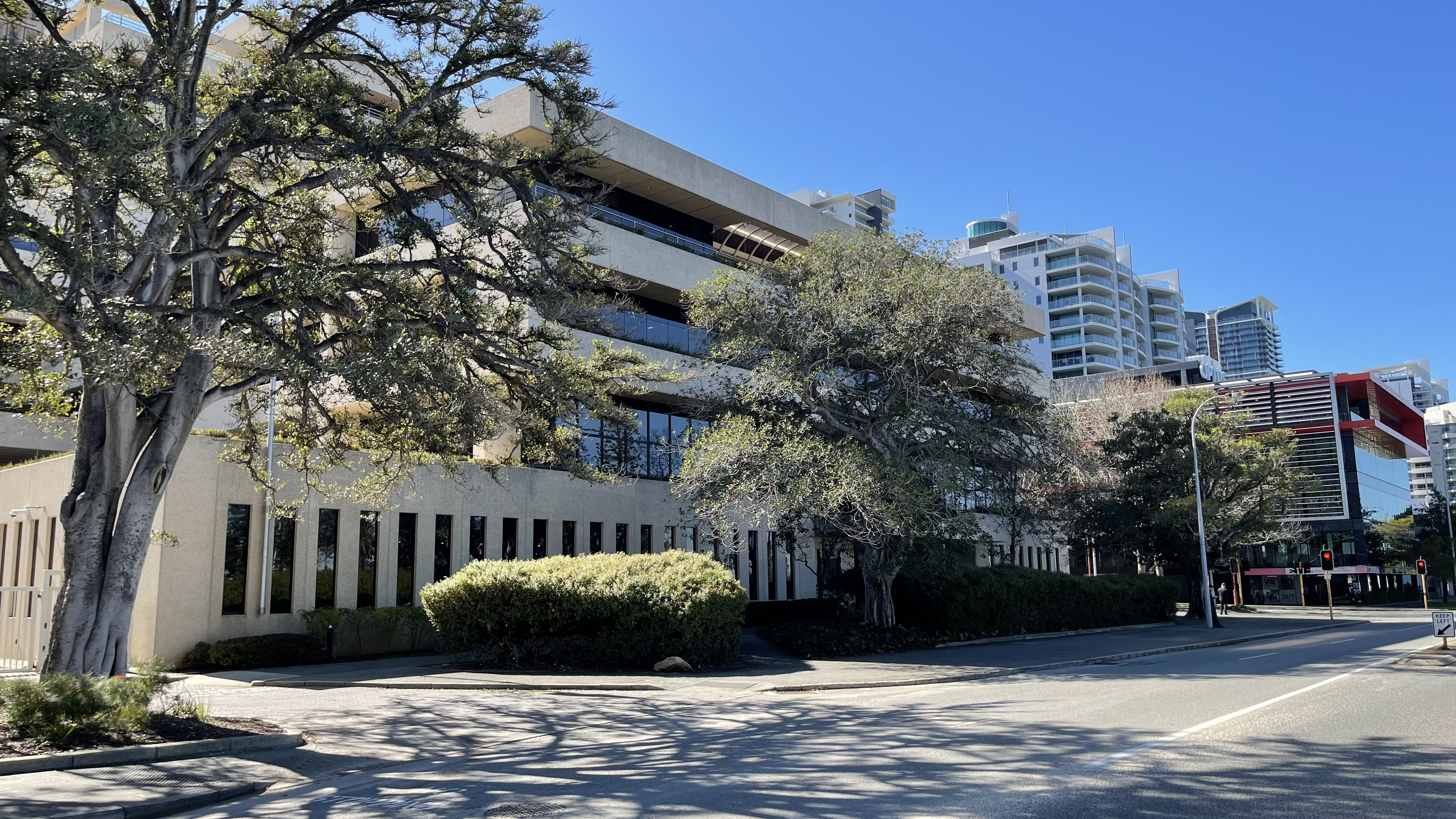
- Family Court of Western Australia viewed from southwest across Terrace Road
- Interactive map of Family Court of Western Australia
- 31.9588609°S 115.8642993°E
- Established: 1975
- Jurisdiction: Western Australia
- Location: Full time sittings are held in Perth, and a few sittings are held in Albany, Broome, Bunbury, Geraldton and Kalgoorlie
- Coordinates: 31.9588609°S 115.8642993°E
- Composition method: Governor appointed by the recommendation of Cabinet.
- Authorised by: Parliament of Western Australia via the Family Court Act 1997 (WA)
- Appeals to: Federal Circuit and Family Court of Australia; Supreme Court of Western Australia
- Judge term length: Mandatory retirement by age 70
- Number of positions: 25
- Website: www.familycourt.wa.gov.au

Chief Judge
- Currently: Gail Sutherland
- Since: 7 Jan 2019

The Family Court of Western Australia is a state court that deals with family law. It was established by the passing of the Family Court Act (WA, 1975) and commenced operation in 1976. It is a state family court under section 41 of the Commonwealth Family Law Act 1975, and deals with the same family law matters as the Federal Circuit and Family Court of Australia, including divorce, marital property settlements, and child custody, and also adoption and surrogacy. Although funded by the Australian Government, it is the only state-based family court in Australia. The reason for the creation of the court as a state court was to bestow additional jurisdiction related to family law on the court, which were beyond the scope of federal power, such as de facto arrangements and adoptions.

== Structure ==
Western Australia is unique amongst Australian states in being the only state with its own family court. Family law matters in all other states are dealt with by the Federal Circuit and Family Court of Australia. The Family Court of Western Australia is an integrated court, in that it combines the functions of a superior court and a lower court. Officially, the Family Court is two courts in one – the Family Court itself (constituted by its judges) and a magistrates' court (constituted by family law magistrates). Its magistrates' division is officially differentiated from the main Magistrates Court of Western Australia by being referred to as the 'Magistrates Court at 150 Terrace Road, Perth'.

Section 41 of the Family Law Act 1975 (Cth) permitted a state to establish its own family court. The Family Court of Western Australia was established by the Family Court Act 1975 (WA). (Note: Later repealed and replaced by the Family Court Act 1997 (WA).) In the second reading speech of the 1975 bill the Minister for Works, Des O'Neil, referred to a number of reasons the Western Australian Government preferred to keep a state-based family court (rather than referring family law matters to a Commonwealth court). These included concerns over the demarcation of federal and state jurisdiction and its effect on litigants, that the court could exercise related state jurisdiction, and to "keep the justice system as close to the people of the state" as possible without the need to establish a Commonwealth court.

In 2008, the federal Attorney-General announced a review of the delivery of family law services by the Family Court of Australia and the Federal Magistrates Court. A November 2008 report set out a possible framework of governance options to achieve a more integrated system of case management practices across the federal family law jurisdiction, with changes in judicial structures and reporting relationships. According to the report, all review submissions, with the exception of that provided by the Federal Magistrates' Court,

considered that the most effective model for the delivery by the Courts of family law services would be a single family court, with two separate judicial divisions serviced by a single administration.

The proposed federal model is similar to that of the Family Court of Western Australia, which the Law Council of Australia, in its submission, had noted as "providing a useful model of the structure and functioning of an integrated Family Court". The Chief Justice of the Family Court of Australia, Diana Bryant, in her submission, also favoured a single integrated federal family court structured similarly to the Family Court of Western Australia.

=== Funding ===
Under the terms of a 1976 agreement signed by Prime Minister Malcolm Fraser and the State Premier Charles Court, the Commonwealth government provides almost all funding for the operation of the Family Court of Western Australia. The Western Australian government issues an invoice to the Commonwealth, on a quarterly basis, for the cost of operations, and receives payment from the Commonwealth. In 2007–08, the court's operating budget was approximately A$17 million, $10.6M of which was for staff and judicial salaries. In that financial year, expenditure exceeded budget by $1.27M and by July 2008, the court was carrying a cash deficit position of almost $200,000.

Although a state court, the Family Court of Western Australia is located within the Commonwealth court complex, which houses the Federal Court of Australia in Perth. The court leases part of the building from the Commonwealth. Court security is provided as part of the lease arrangement.

== Jurisdiction ==
For married people who want to divorce and make arrangements for children, property and spousal maintenance, proceedings in the Family Court of Western Australia are held under the Family Law Act 1975 (Commonwealth), which is federal legislation. For unmarried people who seek arrangements for children, property and maintenance, the court's proceedings are held under the Family Court Act of 1997 (Western Australia) which is state legislation. In 2002, the legislation was amended to incorporate de facto relationships and their property matters.

=== Adoption ===
Elsewhere in Australia, the legal aspects of adoption are dealt with either in the Supreme or District Courts of each state and territory. In Western Australia, the Family Court of Western Australia is responsible for the approval of adoption applications in the state. Judges of the court make adoption orders and other related orders, and the court then issues the appropriate orders. The court also releases information from past adoption cases at the request of the Department of Communities. Officers at the court coordinate the processing of adoption applications and release of information as well as answering enquiries from the public.

=== Surrogacy ===
The Family Court of Western Australia has jurisdiction under the Western Australian Surrogacy Act 2008. Judges of the court may make parentage orders and other related orders. A parentage order transfers the parentage of a child from his or her surrogate birth parents to the child's arranged parents. The arranged parents then become the child's legal parents. After commencement of the Surrogacy Act 2008 on 1 March 2009, any person wishing to enter into a surrogacy arrangement must comply with all the procedures set out under the act and regulations if they propose to apply to the Family Court of Western Australia for a parentage order. If a child is conceived through a surrogacy arrangement before the act came into effect, an application may be made to the Family Court of Western Australia for a parentage order provided the application is brought within 12 months of the child's birth and all the requirements set out in the act have been met.

== Judicial officers ==
The court is presided over by six judges, fifteen magistrates, and eleven registrars.

=== Chief Judge ===
- Justice Gail Sutherland (appointed 7 January 2019) (but appointed Registrar of the Family Court of Western Australia in 2009 and a Family Law Magistrate in 2010)

=== Judges ===
- Justice Richard O'Brien (appointed 7 March 2016)
- Judge Ciara Tyson (appointed 7 January 2019)
- Justice Michael Berry (appointed 10 June 2022)
- Justice Robin Cohen SC (appointed 14 October 2022)
- Justice Steven Jones SC (appointed 5 April 2023)

All the court's judges, apart from Ciara Tyson, hold dual commissions; on appointment to office, they are also appointed to the Federal Circuit and Family Court of Australia (Division 1). In addition to their judicial role in relation to family law matters, judges of the Family Court of Western Australia are often required after hours and on weekends to determine applications under the Telecommunications (Interception) Act from law enforcement agencies, relating to authorisations for carrying out telephone surveillance activities. In 2005 there were 153 such applications.

=== Family Law Magistrates ===
As of 14 August 2026, the Magistrates of the Court are:

- Magistrate Lisa Stewart
- Magistrate Francine Walter
- Magistrate Catherine Osborn
- Magistrate Eric Martino
- Magistrate Neil Anderson
- Magistrate Andrew Mackey
- Magistrate Megan Wadsworth
- Magistrate Rebecca Hall
- Magistrate Jane Johnson
- Magistrate Jocelyn Connick
- Magistrate Jo Brinkley
- Magistrate Samantha Craig
- Magistrate Stacey Wellings
- Magistrate Andrzej Meysner
- Magistrate Nicole Croft

=== Registrars ===
- Registrar Leonie Forrest (Principal Registrar)
- Registrar Samantha Padfield
- Registrar Fiona Amaro
- Registrar Genevieve Smit
- Registrar Emma Walke
- Registrar Tonya Jensen
- Registrar Devin Sanghavi
- Registrar Victor Tham
- Registrar Michelle Rydzewski
- Registrar Clare Wyatt
- Registrar Majella Bouwman

== See also ==
- Australian family law
