= Richard Gee (judge) =

Australian judge (1933–2017)

Richard Walter Gee (19 October 1933 – 2 January 2017) was an Australian judge of the Family Court of Australia from 1980 to 1999. In 1984, he survived the bombing of his home in a series of attacks targeting Family Court judges between 1980 and 1985.

Gee was born in Sydney in 1933, and educated at Sydney Church of England Grammar School. He graduated from the University of Sydney and Sydney Law School with a Bachelor of Arts and Bachelor of Laws. In 1958, he worked as an associate for Justice Martin Hardie of the Supreme Court of New South Wales, and became a barrister in 1959, practising until 1980.

In 1980, Gee was appointed as a judge of the Family Court. On 6 March 1984, a bomb exploded at Gee's home in the Sydney suburb of Belrose. Gee and his family survived, but Gee was hospitalised with cuts to his face, legs and arms. Gee retired as a judge in 1999.

On 2 January 2017, Gee was reported to have drowned in his backyard swimming pool at his home in Belrose, which had been rebuilt after the bombing.
