= Paul Cronin (judge) =

Australian judge

Paul Joseph Cronin is an Australian judge. He was a Judge of the Family Court of Australia from 20 December 2006 until 18 April 2019.

Cronin studied law at Monash University while simultaneously working as a Clerk of Courts in Melbourne. He was admitted to practice as a solicitor in 1980, whereupon he moved to Shepparton. He subsequently practised there for nineteen years, eventually specialising in family law, before being admitted to the bar in 1999.

Cronin was appointed a trial judge of the Family Court of Australia on 20 December 2006, replacing retired judge Susan Morgan.
