= Ray Watson (judge) =

Australian judge

External image
- Justice Ray Watson, 1976, by D.J. McKenzie.

Raymond Sanders "Ray" Watson AM (24 December 1922 – 26 October 2010) was an Australian judge of the Family Court. He was one of the authors of the Family Law Act. He served aboard HMAS Australia (D84) during the Second World War. In 1984 an attempt was made to kill him with a bomb.

== Early life ==
Watson was born in Penrith, Sydney, to a road contractor, and received sporadic education. He worked for the New South Wales transport department in order to put himself through high school. He attended Penrith High School, and studied law at the University of Sydney – although his study was interrupted by service in the navy during World War II. He survived a kamikaze attack on HMAS Australia (D84) in 1944. Just after the war, Watson lived in Austinmer with his wife and son and ran as a Liberal candidate for Werriwa in the 1946 federal election, running on a platform of housing affordability. He gained 27,000 votes in that election. Watson represented the seat of Georges River in the 1947 state election. By 1949, he had had a second child and moved to Kirrawee, again running for election in the 1949 federal election.

== Legal career ==
Watson became a barrister and advised the Commonwealth government as part of a committee on the reform of the Matrimonial Clauses Act 1956, which eventually became the Family Law Act 1975. He rose to sit as a judge on the first Family Court in the 1970s, where he advocated the priority of children's welfare and no-fault divorce.

== Attempted murder ==
On 4 July 1984, a bomb attack on their home injured Watson and killed his second wife Pearl. On 29 July 2015, 68-year-old Leonard John Warwick was arrested by detectives at Campbelltown, New South Wales over the murder of Pearl Watson and three other Family Court related murders between 1980 and 1985, including the shooting death of fellow judge David Opas. On 23 July 2020, Warwick was found guilty of the murder of Pearl, Opas, and another bombing murder. He was also found guilty of numerous other offences including other bomb incidents. On 3 September 2020, Warwick was sentenced to life in prison without the possibility of parole and died in prison on 14 February 2025.

== Personal life ==
Watson was married 3 times. His first wife, Alison, with whom he had four children, died in 1968. Pearl, his second was killed on On 4 July 1984 when an attempt was made to kill her husband with a bomb. His third wife, Esme, died in 2009.

Watson was an avid stamp collector his entire life. He attended the local Methodist Church and became a preacher there.

Watson was contributing to legal books until he suffered a series of strokes and a brain haemorrhage in July 2003, which impacted on his mental acuity, and on 19 October 2003, he suffered head injuries in a fall and was taken to Royal North Shore Hospital.

Ray Watson died on 26 October 2010.

== Publications ==
- Toose, Paul Burcher; Benjafield, David Gilbert; Watson, Ray (1968), Australian divorce law and practice, Law Book Co, ISBN 978-0-455-14080-3
- Watson, Ray; Purnell, Howard (1971), Criminal law in New South Wales. Volume 1, Law Book Co, ISBN 978-0-455-16720-6
- Watson, Ray; Bartley, Reg (1978), Criminal law in New South Wales. Volume 2, Law Book Co, ISBN 978-0-455-19300-7
