= Family Court of Australia =

Australian government body, 1976–2021

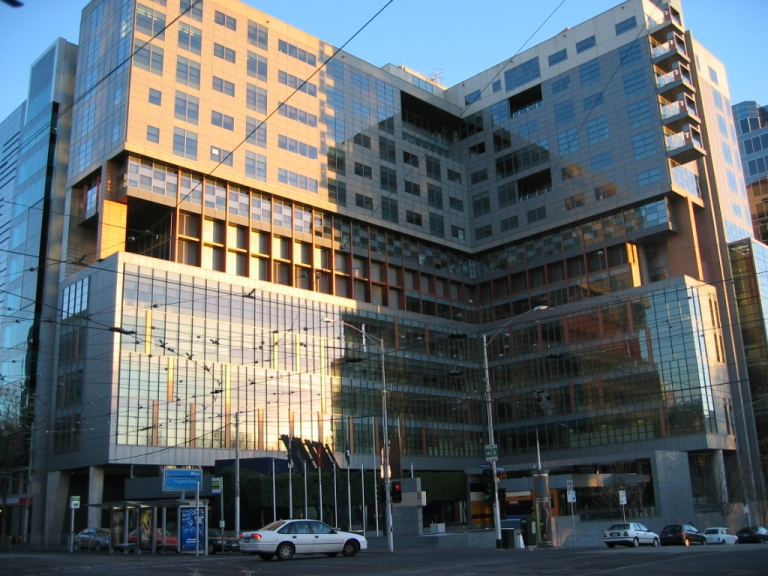
- The Family Court of Australia, Melbourne is housed in the Commonwealth Law Courts Building on the corner of La Trobe and William Streets
- Established: 1976
- Dissolved: 1 September 2021
- Jurisdiction: Australia
- Authorised by: Australian Constitution
- Appeals to: High Court of Australia (on special leave)
- Website: familycourt.gov.au

Chief Justice
- Currently: Will Alstergren
- Since: 10 December 2018

Deputy Chief Justice
- Currently: Robert McClelland
- Since: 10 December 2018

The Family Court of Australia was a superior Australian federal court of record which dealt with family law matters, such as divorce applications, parenting disputes, and the division of property when a couple separate. Together with the Federal Circuit Court of Australia, it covered family law matters in all states and territories of Australia except for Western Australia, which has a separate Family Court. Its core function was to determine cases with the most complex law, facts and parties, to cover specialised areas in family law, and to provide national coverage as the national appellate court for family law matters.

In 2021, the Morrison government introduced legislation merging the Family Court with the Federal Circuit Court of Australia to form the Federal Circuit and Family Court of Australia, effective from 1 September 2021. Since the merger, the Federal Circuit and Family Court of Australia is the only court which has jurisdiction to deal with purely family law related issues (except for Western Australia).

== History ==
=== Establishment ===
The Family Court of Australia was established under Chapter 3 of the Australian Constitution, by the Family Law Act 1975, and commenced operations on 5 January 1976. It currently comprises a Chief Justice, Deputy Chief Justice, Appeal Division judges and other judges. In July 2008, there were 44 judges (5 of whom were also Judges of the Family Court of Western Australia), 2 judicial registrars and 1 senior registrar. In December 2017 the number of judges was down to 36, including 8 Judges of the Appeals Division. The Court maintains registries in all Australian states and territories except Western Australia.

The Court has had five Chief Justices to date, Elizabeth Evatt AC (1976–1988), Alastair Nicholson AO, RFD, QC (1988–2004), Diana Bryant QC (2004–2017), John Pascoe AC CVO (2017–2018) and Will Alstergren QC, the current Chief Justice who was appointed on 10 December 2018 (having served as Chief Judge of the Federal Circuit Court of Australia since September 2017 and continuing to hold that position). The position of Deputy Chief Justice was previously held by John Faulks until 30 October 2016, but has been filled by former Attorney-General Robert McClelland since 10 December 2018.

=== Attacks against ===
From 1980 to 1985 a series of shootings and bombings in New South Wales targeted places, judges, and other people associated with the Court.

On 23 June 1980, Family Court judge David Opas was shot outside his home and died later that night in hospital.

On 6 March 1984, judge Richard Gee, who had taken on Opas' cases after his death, was injured by a bomb at his Belrose home. On 14 April 1984, the Family Court building in Parramatta was bombed without any injuries. On 4 July 1984, Pearl Watson, the wife of Family Court judge Ray Watson, was killed when she opened the door of their unit in Greenwich, triggering an improvised explosive device on the doorstep. Judge Watson is believed to have been the target but was only injured. Like Judge Gee, Watson had taken on some Family Court cases from his predecessor after Gee had been injured in the March 1984 bombing.

Then, on 21 July 1985, Graham Wykes, a Jehovah's Witness minister was killed and another 13 people injured when their Casula Kingdom Hall was bombed. Also in 1985, an unexploded bomb was found in Northmead under the bonnet of a car. The address was formerly that of a solicitor who acted for a woman in a Family Court case. His name was still listed at that address in the phone book.

In 2012, the State Crime Command's homicide squad restarted an investigation into the crimes. In July 2015, Leonard John Warwick was arrested and charged with offences including four counts of murder, one of attempted murder, and 13 counts of burning or maiming with an explosive substance. In July 2020, Warwick was found guilty of the majority of the offences he was charged with, including the murders of Judge Opas, Pearl Watson and Graham Wykes. Warwick died in prison on 14 February 2025.

=== Budget ===
The 2008–09 federal budget provided for Family Court expenditure of $137m (including services provided free to the Federal Magistrates' Court).

== Jurisdiction ==
Commonwealth family law is dealt with by the Family Law Act 1975, the Family Law Regulations 1984 and the Marriage Act 1961.

In 1986–87, the states agreed that children should be dealt with under the same legislation. The Family Law Act 1975 was amended in 1988 to reflect this agreement (although this did not happen in relation to Queensland until 1990). Western Australia, however, did not enter into the agreement and has maintained its own separate Family Court which deals with federal legislation (such as the Family Law Act) as well as state legislation such as the Family Court Act (WA).

The Court has jurisdiction over all marriage-related cases in all states and territories of Australia, except Western Australia which has its own family court. An avenue of appeal to the Family Court of Australia does however exist in relation to judgments in the Western Australian court.

Its jurisdiction covers applications for declarations of the validity or nullity of marriages, divorces, residence, contact, maintenance, child support and property issues. This jurisdiction, granted under the Family Law Act 1975, is a Commonwealth responsibility under the "matrimonial causes" head of power in Section 51(xxii) of the Australian Constitution. Prior to 1975, jurisdiction over family law matters was held and exercised largely by state Supreme Courts under the Matrimonial Causes Act.

=== Difference between relationships ===
The Commonwealth power to legislate for marriage and "matrimonial causes" is supported by sections 51(xxi) and (xxii) of the Constitution, whereas the power to legislate for de facto financial matters largely relies on referrals by States to the Commonwealth in accordance with section 51(xxxvii) of the Australian Constitution. A special cause was created called a "de facto financial cause"; see the Family Law Amendment (De Facto Financial Matters and Other Measures) Bill 2008 explanatory Memorandum.

However, the definitions of "matrimonial cause" and "de facto financial cause" differ in some respects, due to the different sources of Commonwealth power to legislate for these matters. Paragraphs (a) to (d) of the definition of "de facto financial cause", in the Family Law Act 1975 therefore, limit the proceedings within each of those sections to proceedings taken once the relevant de facto relationship has broken down.

==== Limited jurisdiction over de facto relationships ====
Hence, from 1 March 2009 a new section in the Family Law Act 1975 has limited jurisdiction over de facto relationships that have a geographical connection with a participating State or Territory, sections 90RG, 90SD and 90SK of the Family Law Act. Participating states and territories are: New South Wales, Victoria, Queensland, South Australia, Tasmania, the Australian Capital Territory, the Northern Territory, Norfolk Island, Christmas Island or the Cocos (Keeling) Islands. The states referred de facto matters under Section 51(xxxvii) of the Australian Constitution.

==== Children of de facto relationships ====
The Family Court also has jurisdiction over the children of de facto couples and those that have never lived together. This jurisdiction was acquired by the Commonwealth through a referral of powers agreed between the Commonwealth and all states except Western Australia). The initial referral referred to custody and access in the breakdown of de facto relationships.

=== Appeals from first-instance decisions ===
Appeals from first-instance decisions of the Court are to Appeals Division, which includes the Full Court of the Family Court. From the Full Court, the only avenue of appeal is to the High Court of Australia, an action which requires the grant of special leave by the High Court.

== Relationship with Federal Circuit Court ==
With the establishment of the Federal Magistrates' Court in 1999 (now the Federal Circuit Court of Australia), the Family Court has concurrent jurisdiction in most areas, with the FCC. The FMC was initially given jurisdiction to hear applications for nullity and dissolution of marriage, family law property disputes (where the property in dispute was worth less than $0.3m, or property disputes worth more than this if the parties consented), parenting orders providing for matters such as contact, maintenance and specific issues, and where the parties consented, parenting orders providing for the residence of a child. In December 2000, its jurisdiction was extended to encompass "residence". The majority of proceedings under the Family Law Act are now filed in the FMC. In general practice, only the more complex and intractable family law cases are transferred from the Federal Circuit Court to the Family Court.

=== Proposed changes ===
In 2008, the federal Attorney-General announced a review of the delivery of family law services by the Family Court of Australia and the Federal Magistrates Court. A November 2008 report set out a possible framework of governance options to achieve a more integrated system of case management practices across the family law jurisdiction, with changes in judicial structures and reporting relationships. The report concluded that "there exists a significant level of duplication of administrative structures and corporate services across the Family Court and the FMC and that the existing and proposed duplication is not financially sustainable".

According to the report, all review submissions, with the exception of that provided by the Federal Magistrates' Court, "considered that the most effective model for the delivery by the Courts of family law services would be a single family court, with two separate judicial divisions serviced by a single administration." The proposed model is similar to that of the Family Court of Western Australia, which the Law Council of Australia, in its submission, had noted as providing a useful model of the structure and functioning of an integrated Family Court. The Law Council stated that "Chapter III courts exercising largely identical jurisdictions, with separate administrations and competing for funds and resources, is wholly unacceptable and that rationalisation and integration of the two federal courts exercising family law jurisdiction is urgently required."

In her written submission to the Attorney-General, the current Chief Justice, Diana Bryant, noted "the budgetary pressures facing both existing Courts", and that as far as litigants and the public were concerned, there appeared to be significant duplication of resources and functions. She noted that "there are at present two courts with concurrent jurisdiction doing first instance family law work with no legislative differentiation." Her submission favoured combining the current family law functions of the Federal Magistrates Court with the Family Court of Australia under a new Court, with a new name.

== Less adversarial trials ==
In July 2006, under Division 12A of Part VII of the Family Law Act, the Court implemented its model for "less adversarial trials" – to be applied to all new child related proceedings in the Family Court, without the need for consent of the parties. According to the Court, the change from a traditional common law approach to a less adversarial trial "has significant implications, not only for the conduct of family law litigation, but also for the conduct of litigation as a whole."

According to the Family Court, "in a less adversarial trial:

- no affidavits are filed before the trial—parents only complete a questionnaire
- the judge, rather than the parties or their lawyers, decides how the trial is conducted
- the judge controls the case and keeps everyone concentrated on the major disagreements about their children's best interests
- parents and carers can speak directly to the judge, not simply through their lawyers
- the judge identifies the issues to be decided and the evidence to be heard, and
- the judge is assisted by evidence from a family consultant."

== Miscellaneous ==
When the Family Court was established, an attempt was made to make the court less formal and more "family friendly", with a proposal that wigs should not be worn, although gowns would be retained. In 1987, the requirement to wear wigs were reinstated. Judges and judicial registrars of the Family Court of Australia wore a black silk gown, a bar jacket with either bands or a jabot and a bench wig. As of 2025, judges wear a black gown (with a red stripe on appeals and formal sittings).

== See also ==
- Family Court of Australia attacks
- Family dispute resolution
- List of judges of the Family Court of Australia
