= Federal Circuit Court of Australia =

Australian justice court

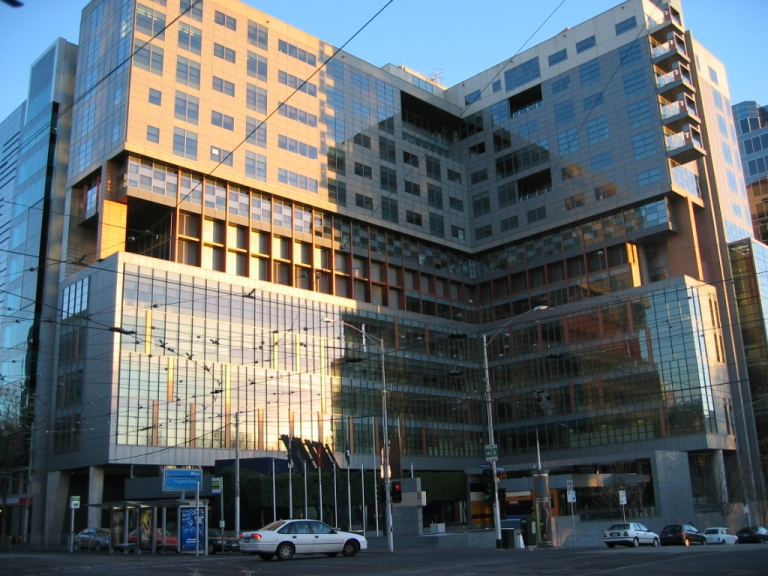
- The Federal Court Building in Melbourne, a location of the Federal Circuit Court
- Established: 1999
- Dissolved: 1 September 2021
- Jurisdiction: Australia
- Location: Canberra; Sydney and regional NSW; Darwin and Alice Springs; Brisbane and regional Qld; Adelaide and Mount Gambier; Hobart, Launceston, Burnie; Melbourne and regional Victoria
- Appeals to: Federal Court of Australia; Family Court of Australia
- Appeals from: Certain federal tribunals and other federal bodies, including: Administrative Appeals Tribunal; Copyright Tribunal of Australia; Defence Force Discipline Appeal Tribunal; Defence Force Remuneration Tribunal; Federal Police Disciplinary Tribunal; IP Australia; Remuneration Tribunal Secretariat; Superannuation Complaints Tribunal

Chief Judge
- Currently: Will Alstergren QC
- Since: 2017

The Federal Circuit Court of Australia, formerly known as the Federal Magistrates Court of Australia or the Federal Magistrates Service, was an Australian court with jurisdiction over matters broadly relating to family law and child support, administrative law, admiralty law, bankruptcy, copyright, human rights, industrial law, migration, privacy and trade practices.

The Court was created to deal with the increasing workload of the Federal Court of Australia and the Family Court of Australia, by hearing less complex cases for them and freeing those Courts to deal only with more complex cases. The Federal Circuit Court dealt with approximately 95% of migration and bankruptcy applications filed in the federal courts. Approximately 90% of the Court's workload was in the area of family law. The Court also deals with nearly 80% of all family law matters filed in the federal courts. It is also intended to replace (in part) the federal jurisdiction with which state courts have been invested under the Judiciary Act 1903.

== History ==
The Court was established on 23 December 1999 by the Australian Government as the Federal Magistrates Court of Australia, as a result of royal assent of the Federal Magistrates Act 1999 (Cth). The Court was known as the Federal Circuit Court of Australia and the Act as the Federal Circuit Court of Australia Act 1999. Its first judicial officers were appointed in 2000; it first applications were filed on 23 June 2000 and the Court's first sittings were conducted on 3 July 2000 in Adelaide, Brisbane, Canberra, Melbourne, Newcastle, Parramatta and Townsville.

On 12 April 2013, in recognition of its increased jurisdiction and its role as an intermediate court servicing regional centres as well as capital cities throughout Australia, it was renamed the Federal Circuit Court of Australia and its judicial officers received the title "Judge" instead of "Federal Magistrate".

In 2021, the Morrison government introduced legislation merging the Federal Circuit Court with the Family Court of Australia to form the Federal Circuit and Family Court of Australia, effective from 1 September 2021.

The Federal Circuit and Family Court of Australia comprises two divisions:

Division 1 (a continuation of the Family Court of Australia) deals with family law matters. Division 2 (a continuation of the Federal Circuit Court of Australia) deals with family law, migration and general federal law matters.

== Chief Judges ==
Only three people have served as Chief Judge or Chief Federal Magistrate. All three have subsequently (or concurrently) held the office of Chief Justice of the Family Court of Australia. They are:

- Diana Bryant (2000–04)
- John Pascoe (2004–17)
- Will Alstergren (2017–21) (who also holds the position of Chief Justice of the Family Court of Australia since 10 December 2018.)

Former judges include folk singer turned lawyer and judge, Judy Small, who served on the Court between 2014 and 2020, and Barbara Baker, later Governor of Tasmania (2021-26), who served on the Court from 2008 to 2021.

== See also ==
- Australian court hierarchy
- List of Commonwealth courts and tribunals
