= 2015 in Australia =

- Monarch: Elizabeth II
- Governor-General: Sir Peter Cosgrove
- Prime minister: Tony Abbott, then Malcolm Turnbull
- Australian of the Year: Rosie Batty
- Elections: Qld, NSW

The following lists events that happened during 2015 in Australia.

- Decades: 1990s; 2000s; 2010s; 2020s; 2030s
- See also: 2015 in Australian television; 2015 in Australian literature; Other events of 2015; Timeline of Australian history

== Incumbents ==
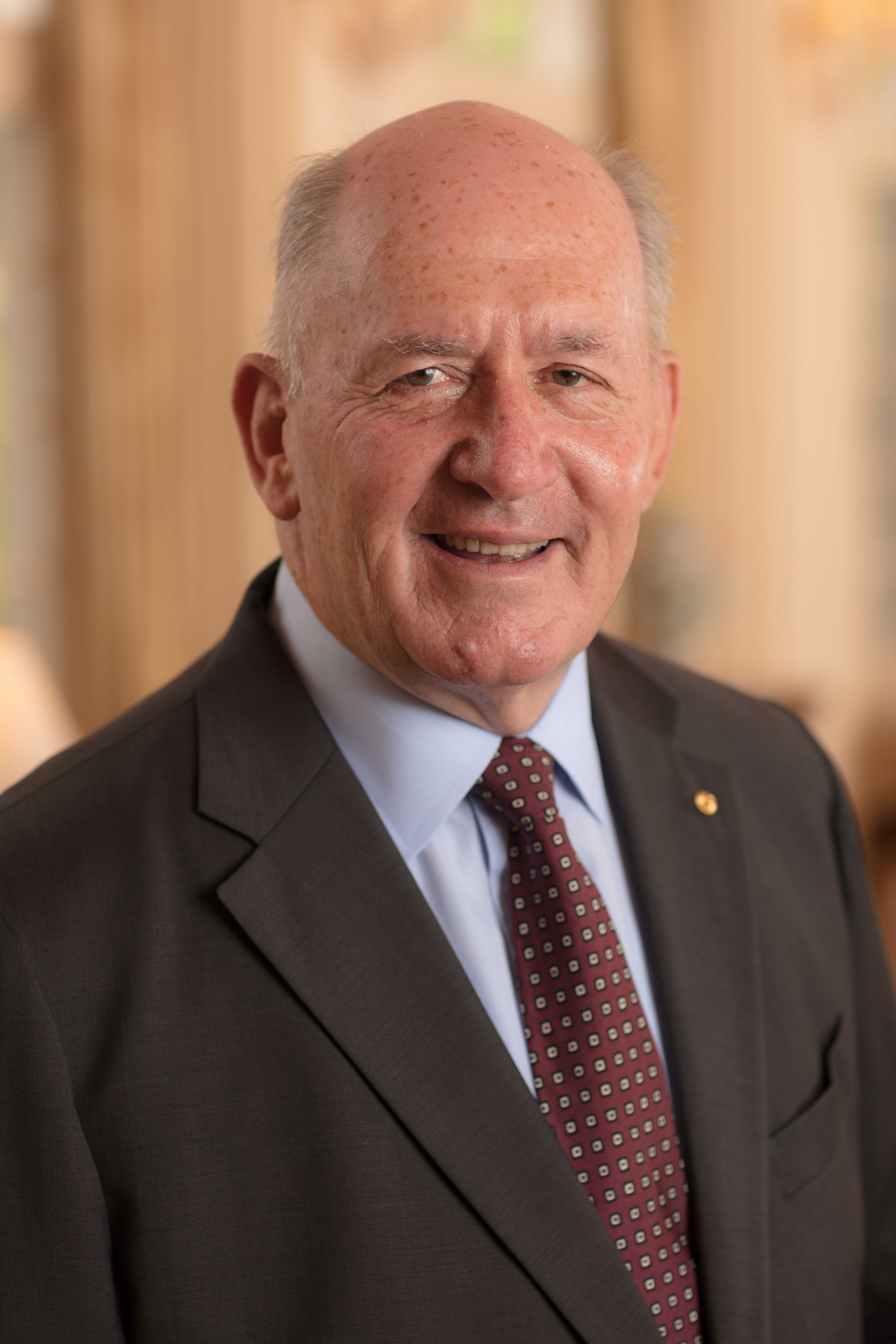
Sir Peter Cosgrove

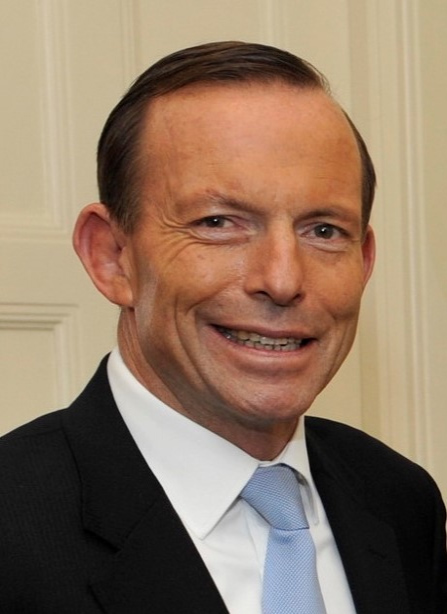
Tony Abbott

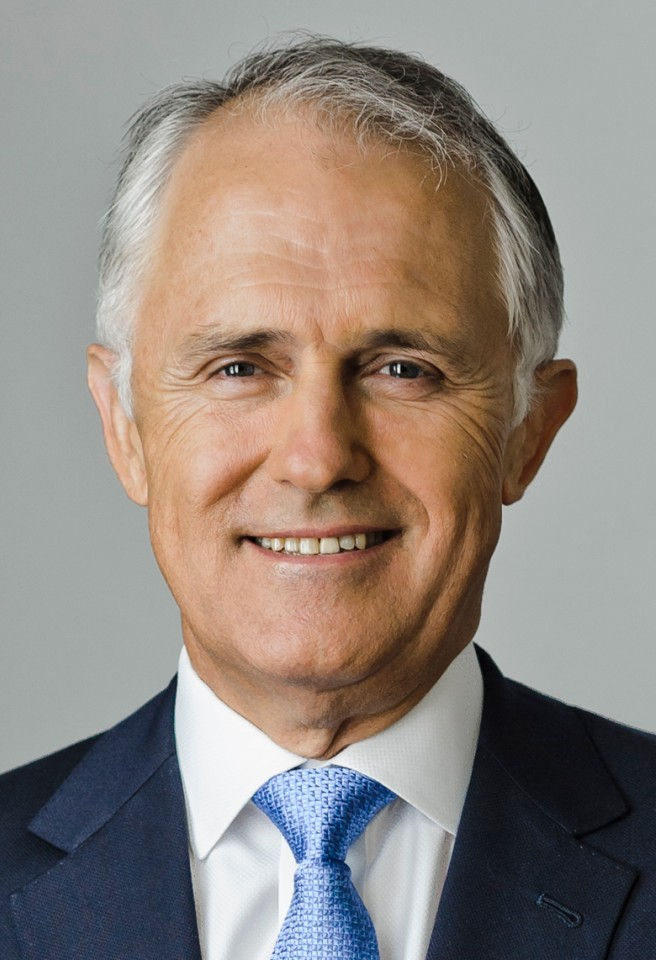
Malcolm Turnbull

- Monarch – Elizabeth II
- Governor-General – Sir Peter Cosgrove
- Prime Minister – Tony Abbott (until 15 September), then Malcolm Turnbull
  - Deputy Prime Minister – Warren Truss
  - Opposition Leader – Bill Shorten
- Chief Justice – Robert French

=== State and territory leaders ===
- Premier of New South Wales – Mike Baird
  - Opposition Leader – Luke Foley (from 5 January)
- Premier of Queensland – Campbell Newman (until 14 February), then Annastacia Palaszczuk
  - Opposition Leader – Annastacia Palaszczuk (until 14 February), then Lawrence Springborg
- Premier of South Australia – Jay Weatherill
  - Opposition Leader – Steven Marshall
- Premier of Tasmania – Will Hodgman
  - Opposition Leader – Bryan Green
- Premier of Victoria – Daniel Andrews
  - Opposition Leader – Matthew Guy
- Premier of Western Australia – Colin Barnett
  - Opposition Leader – Mark McGowan
- Chief Minister of the Australian Capital Territory – Andrew Barr
  - Opposition Leader – Jeremy Hanson
- Chief Minister of the Northern Territory – Adam Giles
  - Opposition Leader – Delia Lawrie (until 20 April), then Michael Gunner
- Chief Minister of Norfolk Island – Lisle Snell (until 17 June)

=== Governors and administrators ===
- Governor of New South Wales – David Hurley
- Governor of Queensland – Paul de Jersey
- Governor of South Australia – Hieu Van Le
- Governor of Tasmania – Kate Warner
- Governor of Victoria – Alex Chernov (until 30 June), then Linda Dessau
- Governor of Western Australia – Kerry Sanderson
- Administrator of the Australian Indian Ocean Territories – Barry Haase
- Administrator of Norfolk Island – Gary Hardgrave
- Administrator of the Northern Territory – John Hardy

== Events ==
=== January ===
- 2–9 January – Bushfires in the Adelaide Hills and the outer Adelaide metropolitan area destroy 32 houses; and 125 outbuildings.
- 5 January – Luke Foley is elected unopposed as Leader of the New South Wales Labor Party.
- 6 January – Queensland Premier, Campbell Newman, catches the state by surprise when he announces a 31 January election date—the shortest campaign period in the state's history.
- 8 January – Prime Minister Tony Abbott, speaking from the Adelaide Hills, outlines plans for Commonwealth recovery payments for victims of the 2015 Sampson Flat bushfires, amounting to $4 million.
- 10 January – A farewell is held at Cairns Convention Centre for the eight Cairns children who were killed in December. Prime Minister Tony Abbott and Federal Opposition Leader Bill Shorten are among the mourners.
- 15 January – Federal Health Minister, Sussan Ley, announces that the proposed $20 cut to rebates for short consultations with GPs have been taken "off the table" four days before it was due to take effect.
- 19 January – Queensland Police confirm that part of a skull found near at McGregor Creek in north Queensland is that of schoolgirl Marilyn Wallman, who vanished at the age of 14 while riding to school from the Mackay suburb of Eimeo in March 1972.
- 24 January – The families of Bali Nine members Andrew Chan and Myuran Sukumaran make a televised plea for clemency against the death penalty.
- 25 January – Rosie Batty is announced as Australian of the Year.
- 26 January – Angus Houston and Prince Philip, Duke of Edinburgh were appointed Knights of the Order of Australia in the 2015 Australia Day Honours.
- 28 January – The High Court of Australia rules that the Federal Government acted legally in detaining 157 Tamil asylum seekers aboard a Customs boat.
- 31 January – A state election is held in Queensland. The Labor Party led by Annastacia Palaszczuk forms a minority government with the support of an independent MP.

=== February ===
- 2 February
  - Northern Territory Chief Minister Adam Giles is replaced in a late night leadership challenge for the Country Liberal Party by Willem Westra van Holthe.
  - Prime Minister Tony Abbott addresses the National Press Club in Canberra, announcing that the Federal Government is abandoning its paid parental leave proposal. The Prime Minister also clarifies that all awards of the Order of Australia, including knighthoods and damehoods will in future be exclusively the province of the Council of the Order of Australia.
- 3 February
  - Adam Giles refuses to resign as Chief Minister of the Northern Territory, and eventually negotiates to remain as leader, with Willem Westra van Holthe as his deputy.
  - The Reserve Bank of Australia cuts the official cash rate for the first time since August 2013 by one quarter of a per cent to 2.25 per cent—an historic low—in an attempt to stimulate the economy amid concerns over a sharp fall in oil prices, rising unemployment and low consumer confidence.
  - Two electrical contractors die and two are badly burned in a Perth shopping centre explosion.
- 5 February – Journalist Peter Greste returns to Australia after 400 days in Egyptian detention having been freed on 1 February.
- 7 February – After a six-year absence, Lawrence Springborg is again elected as Leader of Queensland's Liberal National Party, replacing Campbell Newman (who lost his seat in the 2015 state election). John-Paul Langbroek is elected Deputy Leader, replacing Jeff Seeney.
- 9 February –
  - A motion to bring about a leadership spill in the Liberal Party of Australia is defeated 61 votes to 39.
  - Surfer Tadashi Nakahara dies after a great white shark attack near Ballina, New South Wales and there are 13 other non-fatal attacks, predominantly in northern New South Wales.
  - The European Broadcasting Union (EBU) announced that Australia will debut in the Eurovision Song Contest 2015 in Vienna, Austria.
- 11 February – A report by the Australian Human Rights Commission, The Forgotten Children: National Inquiry into Children in Immigration Detention 2014, is released. The report and the AHRC's president, Gillian Triggs, are subsequently criticised by Prime Minister Tony Abbott as "blatantly partisan".
- 13 February – Patties Foods issues the first of several recalls of Nanna's brand frozen berries, after an outbreak of Hepatitis A caused by contaminated fruit.
- 14 February – Annastacia Palaszczuk is sworn in as the 39th Premier of Queensland.
- 16 February – The ABC program Four Corners airs allegations that live animals—including rabbits, piglets and possums—have been used as lures, or "live bait", while training dogs in the greyhound racing industry.
- 18 February –
  - Victorian Premier Daniel Andrews announces a $100 million upgrade to Flinders Street railway station in Melbourne, including a restoration of the station's iconic ballroom which has been closed since 1985.
  - The United States Court of Military Commission Review strikes down David Hicks' March 2007 conviction for supporting terrorism.
- 20 February –
  - Category 4 cyclone, Cyclone Lam, makes landfall in the Northern Territory between Milingimbi and Elcho Island, the strongest cyclone to strike the Northern Territory since Cyclone Monica in 2006.
  - Cyclone Marcia makes landfall in Queensland, damaging the city of Rockhampton and surrounds.
  - Social Services Minister Scott Morrison releases the final report of the Productivity Commission's Inquiry into Childcare and Early Childhood Learning which recommends that the current child care system be abolished and replaced with a single subsidy available to nannies "to better meet the needs and budgets of families".
- 23 February –
  - Prime Minister Tony Abbott delivers a statement on national security outlining proposals to strip Australian citizenship from dual nationals found to be involved in terrorist acts and suspending some citizenship rights for others.
  - Disgraced entertainer Rolf Harris is stripped of his Australian honours.
- 25 February – Prime Minister Tony Abbott and Federal Treasurer Joe Hockey announce the Government's planned response to increasing foreign investment, outlining plans to impose an application fee on foreign investors wishing to purchase established homes. The Prime Minister is criticised for using the VIP jet to fly from Canberra to Sydney for the 20-minute press conference during a Parliamentary sitting week.
- 26 February – Qantas posts a half-year net profit of $203 million in massive turnaround for the airline. Qantas CEO Alan Joyce cites the repeal of the carbon tax as the main contributing factor.
- 28 February – Former Governor-General Dame Quentin Bryce presents to the Premier of Queensland the report Not Now, Not Ever: Putting an End to Domestic and Family Violence in Queensland which proposes the introduction of a specialised domestic violence court and a new criminal offence of non-lethal strangulation.

=== March ===
- 3 March –
  - Federal Health Minister Sussan Ley announces that the Government's plans to introduce a $5 General practitioner co-payment have been abandoned due to lack of community support.
  - The Victorian CFA Training College is closed indefinitely after traces of PFOS are found in the site's water tanks. The closure follows years of claims that the site is a cancer cluster.
  - Prime Minister Tony Abbott announces that Australia will send another 300 troops to Iraq to help train the Iraqi army in its fight against Islamic State.
- 4 March –
  - Prime Minister Tony Abbott announces that Australian defence force personnel will receive a pay rise of two per cent per year – an increase on the Government's earlier below-inflation offer of 1.5 per cent.
  - Victorian Premier Daniel Andrews announces tough new laws and a $45.5 million plan to address Victoria's ice epidemic, including a boost to police to crush ice drug labs, as well as better access to rehabilitation and needle exchange programs.
- 13 March – Australian jihadi Jake Bilardi, aged 18, dies carrying out a suicide-bombing attack in Iraq.
- 20 March – The Lindt café in Sydney opens three months after the siege in which two of 17 hostages and gunman Man Haron Monis were killed.
- 24 March – Two Australians are among 150 killed in the Germanwings plane crash in the French Alps.
- 26 March – Data retention laws require phone and Internet providers to store metadata for two years.
- 28 March – A state election is held in New South Wales, and is won by the Coalition government led by Mike Baird.
- 29 March – Queensland Premier Annastacia Palaszczuk announces that the Member for Cook, Billy Gordon, has been expelled from the Labor Party over his failure to disclose elements of his past, including criminal convictions.

=== April ===
- 5 April and July – Reclaim Australia organised Nationalist rallies in several Australian cities. Speakers at these rallies included Danny Nalliah, Pauline Hanson, and George Christensen.
- 6 April – Prince Harry starts a month-long secondment at Royal Military College in Duntroon.
- 7 April – The Federal Court upholds a 'discovery application' by rights-holders of the film Dallas Buyers Club to obtain the contact details of ISP customers whose IP addresses were alleged to have downloaded or shared the film.
- 8 April –
  - Premier Annastacia Palaszczuk announces that she will not change Parliamentary rules, which were introduced by the Newman Government, to reject the vote of ex-Labor MP Billy Gordon, after he refused to quit Parliament and said he would support Labor as an Independent MP.
  - Three of four children die and their mother survives when a car driven by their mother plunges into a Melbourne lake.
  - Prime Minister Tony Abbott announces a national task force after revelations of ice use and related suicides in the Australian Navy.
- 15 April – Victorian Premier Daniel Andrews announces that the Government has reached a deal with the East West Connect consortium to pay them $339 million in costs after cancelling the contracts for the East West Link, Melbourne road project.
- 21 April – Three die as floods wash away houses in Dungog.
- 25 April – The centenary of the Gallipoli Campaign is commemorated on Anzac Day.
- 26 April – Australian Renu Fotadar is one of 19 killed at Everest Base Camp in an avalanche triggered by an earthquake.
- 29 April – Bali Nine ringleaders Andrew Chan and Myuran Sukumaran are executed by firing squad on the Indonesian island of Nusa Kambangan. Australia recalls its ambassador from Indonesia in protest.

=== May ===
- 4–9 May – The triennial Beef Australia exposition is held in Rockhampton attracting 90,000 people.
- 5 May – Queensland Premier Annastacia Palaszczuk announces a Commission of Inquiry into the flooding which led to the 2011 Grantham tragedy.
- 6 May – Christine Milne resigns as leader of the Australian Greens, and is replaced by Richard Di Natale.
- 14 May –
  - The Norfolk Island Legislation Amendment Bill 2015 is passed by the Parliament of Australia, abolishing the self-government arrangements of Norfolk Island.
  - Johnny Depp's wife, Amber Heard, brings pet dogs Pistol and Boo into Australia illegally. Agriculture Minister Barnaby Joyce says that the dogs should "bugger off" back to Los Angeles and suggests that they might be euthanased if they do not leave.
- 23 May –
  - Victorian Premier Daniel Andrews announces that the Victorian Minister for Small Business, Innovation and Trade Adem Somyurek has been stood down over allegations of bullying and intimidating behaviour.
  - Singer Guy Sebastian performs his song "Tonight Again" in Vienna as Australia's very first entry into the Eurovision Song Contest. Overall he comes 5th out of 40 countries.
- 26 May – Prime Minister Tony Abbott announces plans to strip Australian citizenship from dual nationals who go overseas to fight with terrorist groups.

=== June ===
- 4–15 June – The 14th Dalai Lama visits Australia.
- 5 June –
  - Monika Radulovic crowned Miss Universe Australia.
  - Businessman and former Australian of the Year Alan Bond dies in a Perth hospital aged 77.
- 9 June – A utility crashes into a café at Ravenshoe and the resulting explosion kills two and injures 18.
- 10 June – Noor Ellis is jailed for 12 years for ordering the murder of her Bali-based Australian husband Robert Ellis.
- 11 June – Rupert Murdoch steps down as CEO of 21st Century Fox in favour of son James Murdoch.
- 16 June – Chancey Luna, aged 17, is jailed for life for the shooting murder of Australian basketballer Chris Lane in Oklahoma.
- 17 June –
  - The Norfolk Island Legislative Assembly is abolished, ending self-government on the island. Transition arrangements are proclaimed by the Governor-General to an advisory council to administer the island until the establishment of the Norfolk Island Regional Council in July 2016.
  - Australia and China sign the China–Australia Free Trade Agreement (ChAFTA).
- 20 June – The USS George Washington visits Queensland for biennial war games with the Australian Navy, known as Exercise Talisman Sabre.
- 22 June – The Federal Government orders an inquiry into the Australian Broadcasting Corporation after former terrorism suspect Zaky Mallah appears on the Q&A programme.
- 23 June – Australian Islamic State of Iraq and the Levant recruit Mohamed Elomar is reportedly killed in Iraq. Doubts remain about Khaled Sharrouf's death.
- 29 June – 4 July – The Asia-Pacific Model United Nations Conference is held in Perth.
- 30 June – Inmates riot at Melbourne's Metropolitan Remand Prison over the introduction of a smoking ban.

=== July ===
- Early to mid July – Exercise Talisman Saber 2015 is conducted over 20 days in Central Queensland. It is the largest combined military exercise undertaken by the Australian Defence Force and involves up to 30,000 US and Australian troops.
- 1 July – Tim Carmody resigns as the Chief Justice of Queensland after a controversial term lasting just under a year. He will continue to serve as a judge of the Supreme Court of Queensland.
- 3 July –
  - Volcanic ash cloud strands Bali holiday-makers, disrupting several flights in Australia.
  - Adelaide Crows coach Phil Walsh is stabbed to death during a domestic dispute. His son Cy is charged with murder.
- 6 July – Prime Minister Tony Abbott and Federal Opposition Leader Bill Shorten attend a summit of 40 Aboriginal leaders to discuss a possible 2017 referendum for constitutional recognition of Aboriginal people.
- 8 July – The Federal Government conditionally approves the Watermark open-cut coal mine near Gunneda sparking intense opposition.
- 9 July – Iron ore prices plunge to a fresh six-year low as commodity gets caught up in the fallout from Chinese market volatility. The fall intensifies throughout the remainder of the year.
- 13 July – A Royal Commission into family violence begins hearings in Melbourne.
- 14 July – Indonesia cuts quarterly Australian cattle imports to 50,000 from 250,000.
- 16 July – Nigel Milsom is awarded the Archibald Prize for his portrait Judo house pt 6 (the white bird). The Wynne Prize was awarded to Natasha Bieniek for Biophilia and the Sulman Prize was awarded to Jason Phu for I was at yum cha when in rolled the three severed heads of Buddha: fear, malice and death.
- 19 July – Anti Islam Reclaim Australia holds rallies in several Australian cities. One of the Speakers at these rallies included National MP George Christensen.

Millions watch live as Australian surfer Mick Fanning escapes a shark during a competition at Jeffrey Bay, South Africa.

- 29 July – A 68-year-old man is arrested by Strike Force Reddan detectives at Campbelltown, New South Wales for the Family Court of Australia attacks of 1980 to 1985. In these attacks four people were killed: Judge David Opas and Stephen Blanchard were shot dead, Pearl Watson (the wife of Judge Ray Watson) was killed by a bomb, and Jehovah's Witness minister Graham Wykes was killed and 13 others injured when their hall was bombed. Judge Richard Gee was injured by a bomb that destroyed his house.

=== August ===
- 6 August –
  - The jobless figure tops 800,000 for the first time in 20 years.
  - Hutchison Port Holdings sacks 94 workers via SMS and e-mail, triggering strikes in Brisbane and Sydney.
- 10 August – Tony Smith is selected as the Speaker of the Australian House of Representatives. Bronwyn Bishop, the previous Speaker, resigned on 2 August after revelations of seeming misuse of travel entitlements.
- 12 August – The Commonwealth Bank posts a profit of $9.1 billion, a record for an Australian bank.
- 13 August – James Packer stands down as Crown Resorts chairman.
- 18 August – Rock music performer Jimmy Barnes and his family narrowly escape a Bangkok bombing that kills 20.
- 19 August – Bankrupt whistleblower Kathy Jackson is ordered to pay $1.4 million to the Health Services Union after the Federal Court of Australia finds that she misused union money.
- 20 August –
  - Hackers expose personal information from cheating website Ashley Madison.
  - Seven men are stopped from boarding flights allegedly to join terrorists in Middle East.
- 28 August – Australian Border Force announces its officers would be placed throughout the Melbourne central business district to conduct visa compliance checks over the upcoming weekend as part of a joint-agency exercise with Victoria Police called Operation Fortitude. After protests at the operation's media launch at Flinders Street railway station, Victoria Police cancels the operation.
- 31 August – Unions Royal Commissioner Dyson Heydon rules that he will not step aside from the Commission over a speaking engagement at a Liberal fundraiser.

=== September ===
- 9 September – The Australian refugee intake is increased by 12,000 in response to the humanitarian crisis in Syria and Iraq.
- 10 September – The Parliament of Western Australia pass a bill that recognises Aboriginal people in the state Constitution.
- 14 September – Malcolm Turnbull calls upon Prime Minister Tony Abbott to spill the leadership of the Liberal Party, with Abbott calling a party room meeting for later that evening. Turnbull wins the leadership ballot 54–44, becoming leader of the Liberal Party. Turnbull was sworn in as the 29th Prime Minister of Australia on 15 September.
- 16 September – Australian fighter jets hit Islamic State of Iraq and the Levant targets inside Syria for the first time.
- 19 September – Former SAS captain Andrew Hastie wins the Canning by-election in Western Australia.
- 21 September – Prime Minister Malcolm Turnbull drops Joe Hockey from the ministry, appoints Scott Morrison as Federal Treasurer and Marise Payne as Australia's first female Defence Minister.
- 24 September – The Federal Government commits $100 million to boost domestic violence services.

=== October ===
- 2 October – Curtis Cheng, a civilian worker for the New South Wales Police Force is shot dead outside police headquarters in Parramatta. The suspected perpetrator, a 15-year-old boy, is shot dead by police shortly afterwards. See 2015 Parramatta shooting
- 6 October – Australia and 11 other countries form the Trans-Pacific Partnership.
- 7 October –
  - Volkswagen announces that more than 77,000 diesel vehicles sold in Australia were fitted with emissions-cheating software.
  - The High Court of Australia rules that the breast cancer gene BRCA1 is not a patentable invention.
- 8 October –
  - Brian Loughnane resigns as Liberal Party Federal Director.
  - A Commission of Inquiry finds that the 2011 flood in Grantham, Queensland, which killed 12 people, was a freak of nature.
- 21 October – The remains of a two-year-old girl was found in a suitcase on a South Australian roadside is identified as Khandalyce Pearce, five years after her mother's body was found in Belanglo State Forest, New South Wales.
- 28 October – Father and son prison escapees, Gino and Mark Stocco are arrested at a remote New South Wales property after eight years on the run.

=== November ===
- 2 November – Prime Minister Malcolm Turnbull announces that the knight and dame classes of honours of the Order of Australia will be abolished, eighteen months after they were re-introduced by Tony Abbott.
- 7 November – The Royal Commission into Trade Union Governance and Corruption clears Federal Opposition Leader Bill Shorten of wrongdoing during his time at the helm of the Victorian Australian Workers Union.
- 8 November – Detainees riot at Christmas Island following the death of asylum seeker Fazel Chegeni after he escaped from the detention centre.
- 10 November – Prince Charles and Camilla, Duchess of Cornwall begin a six-day tour of South Australia, New South Wales and Western Australia.
- 13 November – Hobart woman Emma Parkinson, aged 19, is injured in the November 2015 Paris attacks which kills about 130 people.
- 17 November – Four people die in bushfires around Esperance, Western Australia.
- 21 November – Two Australians are among seven dead in a helicopter crash at Fox Glacier in New Zealand.
- 25 November – A bushfire kills two people trapped in a car north of Adelaide.
- 26 November – Australia moves to a new five-tier terrorism threat advisory system.

=== December ===
- 2 December – The Bureau of Meteorology falls victim to a major cyber attack on its computers and there are suggestions that China may be responsible.
- 3 December –
  - Former Industry Minister Ian Macfarlane announces that he will leave the Liberal Party to join the National Party.
  - A Queensland Parliamentary Ethics Committee report finds that Queensland Police Minister Jo-Ann Miller demonstrated a pattern of reckless conduct that was not of ministerial or Parliamentary standard. Ms. Miller resigns as Police Minister and from Cabinet the following day after the Government signals its intention to remove her.
  - The Federal Government strikes a deal with the Australian Greens to push multi-national tax-avoidance laws through Parliament.
- 4 December –
  - In a landmark case, the Melbourne Magistrates Court finds 54-year-old Uber driver, Nathan Brenner, guilty of operating as a commercial driver without proper accreditation and imposes a fine of $900.
  - Two die of drug overdoses at the Stereosonic music festivals in Sydney and Adelaide.
- 5 December – Liberal staffer Trent Zimmerman wins Joe Hockey's former seat of North Sydney in the North Sydney by-election.
- 6 December – Prime Minister Malcolm Turnbull announces that the Federal Government will implement 38 recommendations from the National Ice Taskforce and will spend more than $300 million implementing a new strategy aimed at tackling ice drug addiction.
- 7 December –
  - Prime Minister Malcolm Turnbull unveils his Government's vision for a more innovative economy to create an "ideas boom", outlining plans to give generous tax breaks to Australians who invest in start-up companies and changes to the insolvency laws to inspire greater entrepreneurships.
  - Queensland Premier Annastacia Palaszczuk announces a Queensland Cabinet reshuffle with the appointment of three new ministers, bringing total numbers from 14 to 17, and the splitting of a number of "super-portfolios" to lessen the workload on particular ministers. In doing so, the Premier is accused by the Opposition by breaking an election promise not to increase Cabinet numbers.
  - Mining magnate Clive Palmer loses a Supreme Court of Western Australia case to force his estranged Chinese business partner, CITIC Pacific, to pay his company, Mineralogy, $48 million. The court decision throws the future of Queensland Nickel into jeopardy as a result.
- 8 December –
  - The Queensland Court of Appeal downgrades Gerard Baden-Clay's charge from murder to manslaughter for the death of his wife Allison in 2012.
  - Joe Hockey is appointed ambassador to Washington.
- 9 December –
  - The Victorian Auditor-General reveals in a report that the true cost of abandoning the East West Link, Melbourne motorway is $1.1 billion, as well as finding that both the Napthine and Andrews Governments were poorly advised by public servants on matters such as costs.
  - Legislation to allow same-sex couples to adopt passes the Victorian Parliament, after the Government decides to accept Upper House amendments allowing religious organisations the right to refuse an adoption to gay couples.
  - Prime Minister Malcolm Turnbull visits Western Australia and meets firefighters who battled deadly bushfires near Esperance. Mr. Turnbull raises the possibility of improvements to communication infrastructure in fire-prone regions using federal funds.
- 11 December –
  - A far-right group Party for Freedom planned to mark the tenth anniversary of 2005 Cronulla riots with a rally on Saturday, 12 December 2015. The rally was refused permission in the Supreme Court of New South Wales "on the grounds it would stir up racial hatred". In a separate case, the Federal Court of Australia ruled that no other person or groups could commemorate the anniversary.
  - At the Council of Australian Governments (COAG) Meeting in Sydney, Prime Minister Malcolm Turnbull and the State Premiers agree to extend indefinite detention laws to convicted terrorists considered to be a continued risk, as well as agreeing on a timeframe for tax reform.
- 12 December –
  - Tenth anniversary of 2005 Cronulla riots
  - Foreign Minister Julie Bishop is among the signatories to a global climate change agreement after a two-week summit at the 2015 United Nations Climate Change Conference in Paris.
- 13 December – Illness prevents Cardinal George Pell from leaving Rome to make a third appearance at the Royal Commission into Institutional Responses to Child Sexual Abuse.
- 15 December –
  - Federal Treasurer Scott Morrison delivers the Mid-Year Economic and Fiscal Outlook which predicts a deficit of $37.4 billion for the 2015–16 financial year. The Federal Government has made cuts in the health and welfare budgets to pay for new spending on immigration, innovation and pharmaceutical subsidies.
  - BHP Billiton shares sink to a 10-year low as the benchmark S&P/ASX 200 index drops below 5,000.
- 16 December – A tornado with record wind speeds of up to 213 km/h. sweeps through Sydney's south-east, destroying dozens of houses.
- 18 December –
  - New South Wales Premier Mike Baird unveils plans for the forced amalgamations of local councils, with the number of councils being reduced by 40, from 152 to 112.
  - Prime Minister Malcolm Turnbull meets Japanese Prime Minister Shinzō Abe during his one-day trip to Japan and announces a partnership between Australian and Japanese universities, as well as the possibility of joint military exercises, while expressing deep disappointment of Japan's resumption of whaling.
- 19 December – 12 houses are destroyed by a wildfire in Scotsburn.
- 20 December – West Australian Premier Colin Barnett announces that the Perth Children's Hospital would not be open until late 2016, a year later than originally planned. Mr. Barnett also reveals that he expects his next term to be his last in politics.
- 21 December – West Australian Treasurer Mike Nahan releases the State's mid-year Budget review, announcing that as a result of back-to-back deficits, this year's deficit will hit $3.1 billion as opposed to the $2.7 billion outlined in the Budget.
- 25 December – At least 116 homes are destroyed by bushfires in Wye River and Separation Creek in the Great Ocean Road region of Victoria.
- 28 December – Federal Health Minister Sussan Ley announces that 23 tests and procedures, including ear, nose and throat surgeries and diagnostic imaging, have been recommended for removal from the Medicare Benefits Schedule as part of major reforms to Medicare.
- 29 December – Cities and the Built Environments Minister Jamie Briggs resigns from the federal ministry and admits being guilty of sexual assault against a female public servant in Hong Kong on 27 November. Special Minister of State Mal Brough stands down from the ministry while the Australian Federal Police complete their investigations into his alleged involvement in the scandal over the diaries of former Federal Speaker Peter Slipper.
- 30 December – Commissioner Dyson Heydon releases the final report of the Royal Commission into trade union governance and corruption which details "widespread and deep-seated" misconduct by union officials and refers more than 40 individuals and organisations to authorities such as police.
- Throughout the year – 2015 Australian human powered vehicle season

== Arts and literature ==
- 23 June – Sofie Laguna wins the 2015 Miles Franklin Award for her novel The Eye of the Sheep.
- 17 July – Nigel Milsom wins the 2015 Archibald Prize for his portrait of barrister Charles Waterstreet.

== Sport ==
- 9 to 31 January – Soccer: The 2015 AFC Asian Cup is held in Sydney, Melbourne, Brisbane, Canberra and Newcastle. Host nation Australia wins the cup, defeating South Korea 2–1 in the final.
- 19 January to 1 February – Tennis: The 2015 Australian Open is held in Melbourne. Serbia's Novak Djokovic wins the Men's Singles; the USA's Serena Williams wins the Women's Singles.
- 13 February – Rugby league: After a hiatus through 2014, the 2015 All Stars match is won by the Indigenous All Stars, who defeated the NRL team 20–6. Indigenous prop George Rose of the St George Illawarra Dragons wins the Preston Campbell award for Man of the Match. The Women's All Stars match is held at the same event, won by the NRL team 26–8.
- 14 February to 29 March – Cricket: The 2015 Cricket World Cup is held in Australia and New Zealand. The host nations play the 2015 Cricket World Cup Final, with Australia winning by 7 wickets.
- 20–22 February – Rugby league: The 2015 World Club Series, a departure from the format of the single-match World Club Challenge, is held in England. Among the teams competing are Super League XIX champions St. Helens R.F.C. and 2014 NRL Premiers the South Sydney Rabbitohs, with the latter defeating the former in the final match (still named the World Club Challenge) 39–0.
- 20 February – Queensland Reds rugby union player Karmichael Hunt is charged by Queensland's Crime and Corruption Commission with four counts of supplying cocaine.
- 22 February – Gold Coast Titan players Greg Bird, Dave Taylor, Kalifa Faifai Loa are stood down pending their court appearance over allegedly arranging to supply cocaine.
- 11 to 19 April – Hockey: 2015 Under 15 Girl's Australian Championships
- 19 May – Soccer: Melbourne Victory wins the 2015 A-League Grand Final, defeating Sydney FC 3–0.
- 27 May – State of Origin: Queensland defeat New South Wales 11–10 at ANZ Stadium in the first match of the 2015 State of Origin series. Queensland hooker and captain Cameron Smith is awarded Man of the Match.
- 17 June – State of Origin: New South Wales defeat Queensland 26–18 at Melbourne Cricket Ground in the second match of the 2015 State of Origin series. NSW centre Michael Jennings is awarded Man of the Match.
- 8 July – State of Origin: Queensland win the 2015 State of Origin series, defeating New South Wales 52–6 at Suncorp Stadium in the third match. Queensland five-eighth Johnathan Thurston is awarded Man of the Match, while lock Corey Parker is awarded the Wally Lewis Medal for player of the series.
- July – August – Cricket: The 2015 Ashes between England and Australia is held in England. England defeat Australia 3–2, regaining the Ashes urn. Not sure how this was missed.
- July – Australian rules football: The Australian Football League (AFL) takes steps to stop the continued abuse of Sydney Swans player Adam Goodes by crowds at AFL matches.
- 16 August – Netball: The Australian Netball Diamonds win the 2015 Netball World Cup held in Sydney, defeating New Zealand 58–55.
- 6 September – Rugby league: The Sydney Roosters claim their third straight minor premiership following the final main round of the 2015 NRL season. The Newcastle Knights finish in last position, claiming the wooden spoon.
- 3 October – Australian rules football: Hawthorn wins its third consecutive AFL Grand Final, defeating the West Coast Eagles 16.11 (107) to 8.13 (61).
- 4 October – Rugby league: The North Queensland Cowboys win the 2015 NRL Grand Final, defeating the Brisbane Broncos 17–16 after a golden point. It is the Cowboys' first-ever premiership win after the club's founding in 1995. Halfback Johnathan Thurston wins the Clive Churchill Medal for Man of the Match. Pre-match entertainment is headlined by Cold Chisel.
- 14–18 October – Athletics: The ITU Duathlon World Championships are held in Adelaide.
- 31 October – Rugby union: New Zealand beats Australia 34–17 in the 2015 Rugby World Cup final at Twickenham Stadium, London.
- 3 November – Horse racing: Prince of Penzance wins the 2015 Melbourne Cup, ridden by Michelle Payne, the first female jockey to win the cup in the history of the race.

== Deaths ==
=== January ===
- 2 January
  - Basil Hansen, 88, Olympic ice hockey player (1960)
  - John McQuilten, 65, politician, member of the Victorian Legislative Council for Ballarat (1999–2006).
- 6 January – Ron Hovey, 82, football player (Geelong)
- 7 January
  - David Rolfe, 50, Paralympic swimmer
  - Rod Taylor, 84, actor (The Time Machine, The Birds, One Hundred and One Dalmatians, Inglourious Basterds; died in Los Angeles)
- 8 January – Kep Enderby, 88, politician and jurist
- 9 January – Sarah Kemp, 69, actress (Sons and Daughters)
- 12 January – Trevor Colbourn, 87, professor and academic administrator (died in Florida)
- 13 January
  - Mark Juddery, 43, journalist
  - Keith Wright, 73, politician, MP for Capricornia (1984–1993), convicted child sex offender (died in Vietnam).
- 14 January – Val Holten, 87, cricketer
- 18 January – Paul O'Grady, 54, New South Wales politician
- 20 January
  - Graeme Hugo, 68, demographer and geographer.
  - James Walker, 41, television screenwriter
- 21 January – Harry Gordon, 89, Olympic historian, journalist and newspaper editor.
- 22 January – Kel O'Shea, 81, rugby league player (Western Suburbs).
- 23 January – Les McMahon, 84, politician, member of the Australian House of Representatives for Sydney (1975–1983).
- 24 January – Eric Fitzgibbon, 78, politician
- 26 January – Tom Uren, 93, politician
- 27 January – Margot Moir, 55, singer (The Moir Sisters)
- 28 January – Lionel Gilbert, 90, historian
- 29 January
  - Kel Nagle, 94, golfer
  - Colleen McCullough, 77, author (The Thorn Birds)
- 30 January – Stuart Inder, 88, journalist and editor

=== February ===
- 3 February – Hay List, 9, racehorse
- 4 February – Norman Yemm, 81, actor (The Sullivans)
- 7 February
  - Nita Cunningham, 75, politician, member of the Legislative Assembly of Queensland (1998–2006)
  - Gordon Stone, 100, rugby union player
- 10 February
  - Michael Raupach, 64, climate scientist
  - Pat Rogan, 78, politician.
- 12 February – Anthony Low, 87, historian and academic
- 13 February – Faith Bandler, 96, activist
- 15 February – Barbara Darling, 67, Anglican bishop
- 16 February – Evan Walker, 79, politician, member of the Victorian Legislative Council (1979–1992)
- 19 February – Warren Thomson, 79, pianist
- 20 February – Errold La Frantz, 95, cricket player, administrator and commentator.
- 22 February – Ivan Jones, 72, rugby league player (South Sydney Rabbitohs)
- 23 February – James Aldridge, 96, writer (The Sea Eagle).
- 25 February – Terry Gill, 75, actor
- 26 February
  - Jessica Ainscough, 30, alternative therapy campaigner
  - Paul Hutchison, 47, cricketer

=== March ===
- 1 March – John Clegg, 80, archaeologist.
- 4 March – Terry Fearnley, 81, rugby league player (Eastern Suburbs) and coach (national team)
- 7 March
  - Trevor Griffin, 74, politician, Attorney-General of South Australia (1979–1982, 1993–2001).
  - Ross Turnbull, 74, rugby union player
- 8 March – Brian Cahill, 84, newsreader and politician
- 10 March – Stuart Wagstaff, 90, entertainer
- 13 March – Daevid Allen, 77, musician
- 16 March – Braydon Smith, 23, boxer
- 17 March
  - Ashley Adams, 59, Paralympic shooter
  - Alan Richardson, 74, VFL footballer
- 20 March
  - Eva Burrows, 85, Salvation Army General (1986–1993)
  - Malcolm Fraser, 84, Prime Minister (1975–1983)
- 23 March
  - Michael Laurence, 79, actor and television producer
  - Alan Seymour, 87, playwright (The One Day of the Year)
  - Geoff Tunbridge, 82, VFL football player
- 27 March – Sarbi, 12, special forces detection dog, returned from missing in action in Afghanistan
- 29 March – William Delafield Cook, 79, artist
- 31 March – Betty Churcher, 84, director of the National Gallery of Australia (1990–1997)

=== April ===
- 5 April – Gordon Moyes, 76, evangelist and politician, member of the New South Wales Legislative Council (2002–2011)
- 6 April – Paul Dearing, 73, Olympic hockey player
- 7 April – Betty Lucas, 90, actress
- 9 April
  - Bob McLean, 67, winemaker
  - Ron Payne, 89, politician, South Australian MP for Mitchell (1970–1989)
  - John Toohey, 85, High Court judge
- 10 April
  - Richie Benaud, 84, cricket captain and television commentator
  - Peter Walsh, 80, Senator for Western Australia (1974–1993), Minister for Finance (1984–1990)
- 13 April
  - Brice Bosnich, 78, inorganic chemist
  - Thelma Coyne Long, 96, Hall of Fame tennis player
- 23 April – Ray Jackson, 74, Aboriginal activist
- 27 April – Andrew Lesnie, 59, cinematographer and Academy Award winner
- 29 April
  - Andrew Chan, 31, convicted drug trafficker, member of the Bali Nine (died in Indonesia)
  - Myuran Sukumaran, 34, convicted drug trafficker, member of the Bali Nine (died in Indonesia)

=== May ===
- 1 May – David Day, 63, radio broadcaster
- 7 May – John Dixon, 86, cartoonist
- 9 May – Michael MacKellar, 76, politician, MP for Warringah (1969–1994)
- 10 May – William T. Cooper, 81, bird illustrator
- 11 May – Frank Matich, 80, racing car driver
- 12 May – William MacDonald, 90, serial killer
- 13 May – Bob Randall, c. 80, Indigenous musician and author
- 16 May – Syd Tate, 90, VFL football player
- 18 May – Norm Armstrong, 89, VFL football player
- 20 May – J. S. Harry, 76, poet
- 23 May – Trojan Darveniza, 93, VFL football player
- 24 May – Sir Kenneth Jacobs, 97, judge
- 25 May – John Stubbs, 77, political journalist
- 26 May
  - Bob Hornery, 83, actor
  - Les Johnson, 90, politician, MP for Hughes (1955–1966, 1969–1983)
  - John Pinder, 70, comedy producer

=== June ===
- 1 June – Joan Kirner, 76, Premier of Victoria (1990–1992)
- 4 June – Charlie Morris, 88, naval officer and Olympic hammer thrower (1956)
- 5 June
  - Alan Bond, 77, businessman and convicted fraudster
  - George Seitz, 73, member of the Victorian Legislative Assembly for Keilor (1982–2010)
- 8 June – Jack Grimsley, 89, musical director and composer
- 12 June – Max Spittle, 92, VFL football player
- 13 June
  - Allan Browne, 70, jazz drummer
  - Phillip Toyne, 67, environmental and indigenous affairs activist
- 14 June – Richard Cotton, 74, geneticist
- 17 June –
  - Ron Clarke, 78, Olympic athlete, Mayor of the Gold Coast (2004–2012)
  - Bryan Vaughan, 84, politician and lawyer
- 19 June
  - Sir Harold Knight, 95, economist, Governor of the Reserve Bank (1975–1982)
  - Paul Quinn, 77, rugby league player
- 20 June
  - Takeover Target, 15, Thoroughbred racehorse
  - Ted Whelan, 85, football player (Port Adelaide)
- 24 June – Walter Browne, 66, chess Grandmaster
- 25 June – Graham Gilchrist, 82, football player (Carlton)

=== July ===
- 1 July – David P. Craig, 95, chemist
- 3 July – Phil Walsh, 55, AFL player and coach (Adelaide)
- 6 July – Victor Warren Fazio, 75, surgeon
- 8 July – Harry Messel, 93, physicist
- 14 July
  - Sir Sam Burston, 100, farmer
  - Alby Schultz, 76, politician, MP for Burrinjuck (1998–2013)
- 15 July – Phil Cayzer, 93, national champion and Olympic rower
- 18 July
  - Priscilla Kincaid-Smith, 88, nephrologist
  - Hugh Stretton, 91, historian
- 19 July – Felicity Wishart, 50, environmentalist
- 20 July – Colin Youren, 76, VFL footballer (Hawthorn)
- 21 July – Don Randall, 62, politician, member of the Australian House of Representatives for Canning (since 2001).
- 26 July
  - Lerryn Mutton, 90, politician, member of the New South Wales Legislative Assembly for Yaralla (1968–1978)
  - Richard Smith, 80, diplomat, High Commissioner to the UK (1991–1994)
- 28 July – Barry Hunter, 87, Anglican prelate, Bishop of Riverina (1971–1992).
- 29 July – Peter Sim, 98, politician, Senator for Western Australia (1964–1981)
- 30 July – Louise Crossley, 72–73, environmentalist and scientist

=== August ===
- 3 August – Kevin O'Leary, 95, judge, Chief Justice of the Northern Territory (1985–1987)
- 7 August – Neville Neville, 65, British league cricketer, football agent and director
- 12 August – Frank Scully, 95, politician, member of the Victorian Legislative Assembly for Richmond (1949–1958)
- 15 August – Geoff McGivern, 84, footballer (Melbourne)
- 20 August
  - Veronica Brady, 86, religious sister and academic
  - Frank Wilkes, 93, politician, member of the Victorian Legislative Assembly for Northcote (1957–1988), Leader of the Opposition (1977–1981)
- 22 August – Arthur Morris, 93, cricketer
- 23 August – Paul Royle, 101, Australian prisoner-of-war who took part in the 1944 "Great Escape" from Stalag Luft III
- 28 August – Wally McArthur, 81, rugby league player
- 30 August – Bart Cummings, 87, horse trainer

=== September ===
- 2 September – Lindsay Collins, 71, marine geologist
- 3 September – Andrew Sibley, 82, artist
- 4 September – Geoffrey Bolton, 83, historian
- 7 September – Jane Hill, 79, politician, member of the Victorian Legislative Assembly for Frankston (1982–1985) and Frankston North (1985–1992)
- 13 September – Betty Judge, 94, runner and Olympic coach
- 15 September – Davey Browne, 28, boxer
- 18 September – Jim Ross, 87, footballer (St Kilda)
- 21 September – Yoram Gross, 88, film and television producer
- 23 September – Mike Gibson, 75, sports broadcaster
- 24 September
  - Alan Moore, 101, war artist
  - Harold Stapleton, 100, cricketer (New South Wales)

=== October ===
- 2 October – Lindsay Kline, 81, cricketer
- 4 October
  - Daniel Fletcher, 41, Australian rules footballer
  - Bob Whan, 82, MP for Eden-Monaro (1972–1975)
- 9 October – Tony Rafty, 99, caricaturist
- 11 October
  - John Murphy, 56, musician
  - Andrew Sayers, 58, curator and museum director
- 12 October – Sam de Brito, 46, author and columnist
- 13 October – Sir James Cruthers, 90, business executive and philanthropist
- 15 October – Don Livingstone, 67, politician, member of the Legislative Assembly of Queensland for Ipswich West (1989–1998, 2001–2006)
- 16 October – William "Digger" James, 85, soldier and military physician
- 18 October – Robert Dickerson, 91, artist
- 20 October – Bill Collier, 94, rugby league player (St. George Dragons)
- 29 October
  - Tassie Johnson, 77, Australian rules footballer
  - Peter Knott, 59, politician

=== November ===
- 3 November – Judy Cassab, 95, painter
- 4 November – Steve Hanson, 54, rugby league player
- 5 November – James Achurch, 87, Olympic javelin thrower
- 7 November – John Davis, 71, documentary filmmaker
- 16 November – Barbara Thiering, 85, theologian, historian and writer
- 20 November – Keith Michell, 88, actor (died in London)
- 21 November – Adele Horin, 64, journalist
- 25 November – Kerry Casey, 61, actor, writer and director
- 29 November – Joe Marston, 89, soccer player

=== December ===
- 1 December – Trevor Obst, 75, Australian rules footballer
- 5 December – Ray Crooke, 93, artist
- 7 December – Jennifer Taylor, 80, architect and academic
- 10 December – Maurice Graham, 83, rugby union player
- 11 December
  - Ken Woolley, 82, architect
  - Harry Butler, 85, naturalist and conservationist
  - Jake Howard, 70, rugby union player (national team)
- 13 December
  - John Bannon, 72, Premier of South Australia (1982–1992)
  - Peter Ryan, 92, newspaper columnist
- 14 December – Mick Twomey, 84, Australian rules footballer
- 20 December – Jim West, 61, boxer
- 21 December – Carol Burns, 68, actress
- 24 December – Jim Carlton, 80, MP (1977–1994), Minister for Health (1982–1983)
- 27 December – Stevie Wright, 68, musician and songwriter, lead singer of The Easybeats.
- 28 December – Maggie Deahm, 77, politician, MP for Macquarie (1993–1996)

== See also ==
- 2015 in Australian television
- List of Australian films of 2015
