= Electoral results for the district of Frankston =

Victoria, Australia, district election results

This is a list of electoral results for the Electoral district of Frankston in Victorian state elections.

== Members for Frankston ==
First incarnation (1967–1985)
Member	Party	Term
Edward Meagher	Liberal	1967–1976
Graeme Weideman	Liberal	1976–1982
Jane Hill	Labor	1982–1985
Second incarnation (1992–present)
Member	Party	Term
Graeme Weideman	Liberal	1992–1996
Andrea McCall	Liberal	1996–2002
Alistair Harkness	Labor	2002–2010
Geoff Shaw	Liberal	2010–2013
Geoff Shaw	Independent	2013–2014
Paul Edbrooke	Labor	2014–present

== Election results ==
=== Elections in the 2020s ===
2022 Victorian state election: Frankston
Party	Candidate	Votes	%	±%
Labor	Paul Edbrooke	16,595	41.6	−4.8
Liberal	Michael O'Reilly	11,762	29.4	−2.9
Greens	Emily Green	5,060	12.7	+5.0
Freedom	Dragan Suric	1,443	3.6	+3.6
Liberal Democrats	Chrysten Abraham	1,420	3.6	+3.6
Animal Justice	Elizabeth Johnston	1,365	3.4	+0.6
Family First	Richard Brown	1,083	2.7	+2.7
Independent	Darren Paul Bergwerf	844	2.1	+2.1
Independent	Henry Kelsall	369	0.9	–1.0
Total formal votes		39,941	95.3	+0.6
Informal votes		1,614	5.5	−0.6
Turnout		42,264	86.0	
Two-party-preferred result
Labor	Paul Edbrooke	23,429	58.7	−1.5
Liberal	Michael O'Reilly	16,512	41.3	+1.5
Labor hold		Swing	−1.5	

=== Elections in the 2010s ===
2018 Victorian state election: Frankston
Party	Candidate	Votes	%	±%
Labor	Paul Edbrooke	16,844	45.85	+10.87
Liberal	Michael Lamb	12,005	32.68	−3.16
Greens	Colin Lane	2,781	7.57	−0.40
Justice	Lachlan O'Connell	1,564	4.26	+4.26
Democratic Labour	Michael Long	1,366	3.72	+3.72
Animal Justice	James Persson	1,142	3.11	+3.11
Independent	Henry Kelsall	790	2.15	+2.15
Transport Matters	Jyothi Rudra	242	0.66	+0.66
Total formal votes		36,734	93.86	+2.74
Informal votes		2,403	6.14	−2.74
Turnout		39,137	88.03	−3.96
Two-party-preferred result
Labor	Paul Edbrooke	21,972	59.74	+9.26
Liberal	Michael Lamb	14,805	40.26	−9.26
Labor hold		Swing	+9.26	

2014 Victorian state election: Frankston
Party	Candidate	Votes	%	±%
Liberal	Sean Armistead	12,542	35.8	−9.4
Labor	Paul Edbrooke	12,241	35.0	−2.9
Independent	Geoff Shaw	4,514	12.9	+12.9
Greens	Jeanette Swain	2,790	8.0	−0.7
Sex Party	Jamie Miller	972	2.8	+0.5
Family First	Paul Mason	415	1.2	−0.4
Independent	Jerome Breen	311	0.9	+0.9
Christians	Anthony Wallace	308	0.9	+0.9
Rise Up Australia	Lin Tregenza	212	0.6	+0.6
Independent	Reade Smith	179	0.5	+0.5
People Power Victoria	Alan Nicholls	158	0.5	+0.5
Independent	Joseph Toscano	140	0.4	+0.4
Independent	Mervyn Vogt	125	0.4	+0.4
Independent	Marianne Tootell	87	0.2	+0.2
Total formal votes		34,994	91.1	−4.0
Informal votes		3,410	8.9	+4.0
Turnout		38,404	92.0	+0.6
Two-party-preferred result
Labor	Paul Edbrooke	17,665	50.5	+0.9
Liberal	Sean Armistead	17,329	49.5	−0.9
Labor gain from Liberal		Swing	+0.9	

2010 Victorian state election: Frankston
Party	Candidate	Votes	%	±%
Liberal	Geoff Shaw	14,899	46.79	+6.03
Labor	Alistair Harkness	11,603	36.44	−7.03
Greens	Simon Tiller	2,673	8.39	−1.59
Sex Party	Shem Bennett	797	2.50	+2.50
Democratic Labor	Denise De Graaff	753	2.36	+2.36
Independent	Quinn McCormack	652	2.05	+2.05
Family First	Michael Pleiter	467	1.47	−2.49
Total formal votes		31,844	95.24	−0.53
Informal votes		1,591	4.76	+0.53
Turnout		33,435	92.04	−0.77
Two-party-preferred result
Liberal	Geoff Shaw	16,523	51.71	+4.42
Labor	Alistair Harkness	15,433	48.29	−4.42
Liberal gain from Labor		Swing	+4.42	

=== Elections in the 2000s ===
2006 Victorian state election: Frankston
Party	Candidate	Votes	%	±%
Labor	Alistair Harkness	13,703	43.47	−4.40
Liberal	Rochelle McArthur	12,849	40.76	+0.29
Greens	Wendy Smith	3,146	9.98	−0.52
Family First	Michael Pleiter	1,249	3.96	+3.96
Independent	Fletcher Davis	576	1.83	+1.83
Total formal votes		31,523	95.77	−1.16
Informal votes		1,391	4.23	+1.16
Turnout		32,914	92.81	−0.61
Two-party-preferred result
Labor	Alistair Harkness	16,621	52.71	−3.35
Liberal	Rochelle McArthur	14,910	47.29	+3.35
Labor hold		Swing	−3.35	

2002 Victorian state election: Frankston
Party	Candidate	Votes	%	±%
Labor	Alistair Harkness	15,833	47.9	+5.6
Liberal	Andrea McCall	13,385	40.5	−9.8
Greens	Henry Kelsall	3,472	10.5	+6.7
Citizens Electoral Council	Carolyn Chapple	385	1.2	+1.2
Total formal votes		33,075	96.9	+0.1
Informal votes		1,046	3.1	−0.1
Turnout		34,121	93.4	
Two-party-preferred result
Labor	Alistair Harkness	18,446	55.8	+9.0
Liberal	Andrea McCall	14,629	44.2	−9.0
Labor gain from Liberal		Swing	+9.0	

=== Elections in the 1990s ===
1999 Victorian state election: Frankston
Party	Candidate	Votes	%	±%
Liberal	Andrea McCall	17,778	58.6	−5.7
Labor	Darren Koch	10,083	33.2	−0.4
Greens	Henry Kelsall	1,850	6.1	+6.1
Independent	Frank Borg	626	2.1	+2.1
Total formal votes		30,337	97.9	−0.3
Informal votes		635	2.1	+0.3
Turnout		30,972	92.6	
Two-party-preferred result
Liberal	Andrea McCall	18,399	60.7	−4.7
Labor	Darren Koch	11,891	39.3	+4.7
Liberal hold		Swing	−4.7	

1996 Victorian state election: Frankston
Party	Candidate	Votes	%	±%
Liberal	Andrea McCall	19,180	64.3	+1.1
Labor	Wayne Woods	10,021	33.6	+5.5
Natural Law	Laurens Smits	626	2.1	−2.1
Total formal votes		29,827	98.3	+1.1
Informal votes		520	1.7	−1.1
Turnout		30,347	93.6	
Two-party-preferred result
Liberal	Andrea McCall	19,508	65.4	−2.1
Labor	Wayne Woods	10,300	34.6	+2.1
Liberal hold		Swing	−2.1	

1992 Victorian state election: Frankston
Party	Candidate	Votes	%	±%
Liberal	Graeme Weideman	18,447	63.2	+7.9
Labor	Rohan Cresp	8,192	28.1	−14.7
Natural Law	Margaret Dawson	1,217	4.2	+4.2
Independent	Judy Hale	903	3.1	+3.1
Independent	Richard Hargrave	411	1.4	+1.4
Total formal votes		29,170	97.2	+0.2
Informal votes		850	2.8	−0.2
Turnout		30,020	94.5	
Two-party-preferred result
Liberal	Graeme Weideman	19,661	67.5	+11.4
Labor	Rohan Cresp	9,451	32.5	−11.4
Liberal hold		Swing	+11.4	

=== Elections in the 1980s ===
1982 Victorian state election: Frankston
Party	Candidate	Votes	%	±%
Liberal	Graeme Weideman	15,268	46.3	−5.8
Labor	Jane Hill	14,478	43.9	+4.8
Democrats	Laurence Amor	3,204	9.7	+0.9
Total formal votes		32,950	98.1	+0.2
Informal votes		640	1.9	−0.2
Turnout		33,590	93.6	+0.1
Two-party-preferred result
Labor	Jane Hill	16,513	50.1	+7.3
Liberal	Graeme Weideman	16,437	49.9	−7.3
Labor gain from Liberal		Swing	+7.3	

=== Elections in the 1970s ===
1979 Victorian state election: Frankston
Party	Candidate	Votes	%	±%
Liberal	Graeme Weideman	15,706	52.1	−7.2
Labor	Anna Stewart (activist)	11,774	39.1	+2.6
Democrats	William Towers	2,649	8.8	+8.8
Total formal votes		30,129	97.9	−0.5
Informal votes		646	2.1	+0.5
Turnout		30,775	93.5	+1.2
Two-party-preferred result
Liberal	Graeme Weideman	17,235	57.2	−5.5
Labor	Anna Stewart (activist)	12,894	42.8	+5.5
Liberal hold		Swing	−5.5	

1976 Victorian state election: Frankston
Party	Candidate	Votes	%	±%
Liberal	Graeme Weideman	16,247	59.3	+7.2
Labor	Alison Ogden	10,005	36.5	−0.7
Democratic Labor	John Glynn	1,154	4.2	−0.9
Total formal votes		27,406	98.4	
Informal votes		446	1.6	
Turnout		27,852	92.2	
Two-party-preferred result
Liberal	Graeme Weideman	17,170	62.7	+3.3
Labor	Alison Ogden	10,236	37.3	−3.3
Liberal hold		Swing	+3.3	

1973 Victorian state election: Frankston
Party	Candidate	Votes	%	±%
Liberal	Edward Meagher	22,182	50.5	+2.5
Labor	Donald Mercer	16,854	38.4	−0.7
Australia	David Heath	2,479	5.6	+5.6
Democratic Labor	John Glynn	2,392	5.5	−7.4
Total formal votes		43,907	97.9	+0.3
Informal votes		921	2.1	−0.3
Turnout		44,828	93.0	−1.0
Two-party-preferred result
Liberal	Edward Meagher	25,454	58.0	−1.5
Labor	Donald Mercer	18,453	42.0	+1.5
Liberal hold		Swing	−1.5	

1970 Victorian state election: Frankston
Party	Candidate	Votes	%	±%
Liberal	Edward Meagher	16,191	48.0	−2.1
Labor	Mervyn Vogt	13,198	39.1	+0.6
Democratic Labor	John Glynn	4,367	12.9	+1.4
Total formal votes		33,756	97.6	+0.2
Informal votes		845	2.4	−0.2
Turnout		34,601	94.0	−0.4
Two-party-preferred result
Liberal	Edward Meagher	20,096	59.5	−0.3
Labor	Mervyn Vogt	13,660	40.5	+0.3
Liberal hold		Swing	−0.3	

=== Elections in the 1960s ===
1967 Victorian state election: Frankston
Party	Candidate	Votes	%	±%
Liberal	Edward Meagher	13,521	50.1	−3.1
Labor	Bruce Aitken	10,387	38.5	+4.8
Democratic Labor	John Cass	3,103	11.5	−1.7
Total formal votes		27,011	97.4	
Informal votes		714	2.6	
Turnout		27,725	94.4	
Two-party-preferred result
Liberal	Edward Meagher	16,159	59.8	−4.6
Labor	Bruce Aitken	10,852	40.2	+4.6
Liberal hold		Swing	−4.6	
