= Electoral results for the district of Frankston South =

Victoria, Australia, district election results

This is a list of electoral results for the electoral district of Frankston South in Victorian state elections.

== Members ==
Member	Party	Term
Graeme Weideman	Liberal	1985–1992

== Election results ==
=== Elections in the 1980s ===
1988 Victorian state election: Frankston South
Party	Candidate	Votes	%	±%
Liberal	Graeme Weideman	15,415	54.91	+1.29
Labor	Tony Moore	12,656	45.09	−1.29
Total formal votes		28,071	96.88	−0.81
Informal votes		903	3.12	+0.81
Turnout		28,974	92.16	−0.95
Liberal hold		Swing	+1.29	

1985 Victorian state election: Frankston South
Party	Candidate	Votes	%	±%
Liberal	Graeme Weideman	14,384	53.6	+4.1
Labor	Geoffrey Holland	12,441	46.4	+5.2
Total formal votes		26,825	97.7	
Informal votes		635	2.3	
Turnout		27,460	93.1	
Liberal hold		Swing	+1.4	
