= Electoral results for the district of Frankston North =

Australian district election results

This is a list of electoral results for the electoral district of Frankston North in Victorian state elections.

== Members ==
Member	Party	Term
Jane Hill	Labor	1985–1992

== Election results ==
=== Elections in the 1980s ===
1988 Victorian state election: Frankston North
Party	Candidate	Votes	%	±%
Labor	Jane Hill	15,770	56.48	−1.41
Liberal	Olga Venables	10,379	37.17	−0.18
Independent	Mike Toldy	1,772	6.35	+6.35
Total formal votes		27,921	96.18	−1.34
Informal votes		1,110	3.82	+1.34
Turnout		29,031	92.58	−0.64
Two-party-preferred result
Labor	Jane Hill	16,427	58.83	−0.69
Liberal	Olga Venables	11,494	41.17	+0.69
Labor hold		Swing	−0.69	

1985 Victorian state election: Frankston North
Party	Candidate	Votes	%	±%
Labor	Jane Hill	15,712	57.9	+0.7
Liberal	Robert Garnett	10,139	37.3	+0.8
Independent	Judy Hale	1,292	4.8	+4.8
Total formal votes		27,143	97.5	
Informal votes		690	2.5	
Turnout		27,833	93.2	
Two-party-preferred result
Labor	Jane Hill	16,014	59.0	−2.9
Liberal	Robert Garnett	11,129	41.0	+2.9
Labor hold		Swing	−2.9	
