= Big Jim =

Big Jim may refer to:

== People ==
=== Nickname ===
- James Cameron (born 1954), Canadian filmmaker
- James Clark (shinty) (born 1973), Scottish shinty player
- Jim Clinton (1850–1921), American Major League Baseball player
- James Colosimo (1878–1920), Italian-American Mafia crime boss
- Jim Courtright (gunman) (1848–1887), American lawman and murderer
- Jim Crockett (1909–1973), American professional wrestling promoter and sports franchise owner
- Jim Daniell (1918–1983), American National Football League player
- Giacomo Ferri (born 1959), Italian football manager and former player
- James Fisk (financier) (1835–1872), American stockbroker, corporate executive and "robber baron"
- Jim Folsom (1908–1987), American politician, twice governor of Alabama
- Jim French (cowboy), key participant in the 1878 Lincoln County Wars
- Jim Fridley (1924–2003), American Major League Baseball player
- Jim Hamilton (rugby union) (born 1982), Scottish rugby union footballer
- Jim Healy (trade unionist) (1898–1961), Australian trade unionist and communist activist
- Jim Hogg (1851–1906), American lawyer and politician, 20th governor of Texas
- Jim Justice (born 1951), American businessman and politician, 36th governor of West Virginia
- James Larkin (1876–1947), Irish trade union leader and socialist activist
- Jim McCafferty (1916–2006), American college basketball coach
- Jim Mills (rugby league) (born 1944), Welsh rugby union and rugby league footballer
- Jim Nance (1942–1992), American college and pro football player
- James Patrick O'Leary (1869–1925), Chicago gambling boss and saloon owner
- James Pendergast (1856–1911), American politician, first political boss of Kansas City
- Jim Ricca (1927–2007), American National Football League player
- Jim Rivera (1921–2017), American Major League Baseball player
- Jim Roberts (baseball) (1895–1984), American Major League Baseball pitcher
- James Roberts (trade unionist) (1878–1967), New Zealand trade unionist and president of the Labour Party
- Jim Robinson (trombonist) (1892–1976), American jazz musician
- Jim Schrader (1932–1972), American National Football League player
- Jim Smith (cricketer, born 1906) (1906–1979), English cricketer
- James R. Thompson (1936–2020), American politician, longtime governor of Illinois
- Jim Thompson (writer) (1906–1977), American author and screenwriter
- Jim Tatum (1913–1959), American college football and baseball player and coach
- Jim Tinndahn (born 1961), Danish mobster
- Jim Tucker (journalist) (1934–2013), American journalist
- Jim Weaver (right-handed pitcher) (1903–1983), American Major League Baseball pitcher
- Jim West (boxer) (1954–2015), Australian boxer
- Jim Williams (powerlifter) (1940–2007), American powerlifter
- James "Big Jim" Wright (1966–2018), American musician

=== Native Americans ===
- Big Jim, grandson of Tecumseh and chief of the Kispicotha or Absentee Shawnee band – see Mardock Mission

=== Ring name or stage name ===
- James Harris (1950–2020), American professional wrestler under the ring names Kamala (wrestler) and Big Jim Harris
- Jim Martin (musician) (born 1961), American rock guitarist
- Big Jim Sullivan (1941–2012), English guitarist born James George Tomkins
- Jimmy Valiant (born 1942), semi-retired professional wrestler and author born James Harold Fanning

== Characters ==
- "Big Jim" Walker, title character of the Jim Croce song "You Don't Mess Around with Jim"
- Big Jim, a character in the Bob Dylan song "Lily, Rosemary and the Jack of Hearts"
- Big Jim, in the song of the same name by Emerson, Lake & Palmer
- Title character of the film Big Jim McLain, played by John Wayne
- "Big Jim" Colfax, a villain in the 1946 film The Killers
- Big Jim McKay, in the Charlie Chaplin film The Gold Rush, played by Mack Swain
- "Big Jim" Devine, a major character in the Australian crime drama television series Underbelly: Razor
- James "Big Jim" Rennie, a major character in the Stephen King novel Under the Dome and the television series based on it
- James R. "Big Jim" Smoke, Copperhead antagonist and would-be assassin of President Lincoln in Peter G. Tsouras' The Britannia's Fist Trilogy

== Other uses ==
- Big Jim (toy line), a Mattel action figure line
- Big Jim Mountain, part of the Chiwaukum Mountains in Washington state, United States
- James T. Staples, a 1908 American sternwheel steamboat also known as the Big Jim
- KJRV ("Big Jim 93.3"), a radio station licensed to serve Wessington Springs, South Dakota
- Big Jim pepper, a variety of New Mexico chile pepper

== See also ==
- Jim Folsom Jr. (born 1949), American politician, nicknamed "Little Jim" to distinguish him from his father, "Big Jim" Folsom (see above)
