= Paul Edbrooke =

Australian politician

The Honourable Paul Edbrooke MP
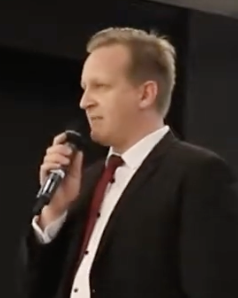

Minister for Police Minister for Emergency Services Minister for Multicultural Affairs Minister for Crime Prevention
- Incumbent
- Assumed office 4 August 2026
- Premier: Ben Carroll
- Preceded by: Anthony Carbines (Police and Crime Prevention); Vicki Ward (Emergency Services); Ingrid Stitt (as Minister for Multicultural and Multifaith Victoria)
Other ministerial offices
Minister for Consumer Affairs
In office 15 April 2026 – 4 August 2026
Premier	Jacinta Allan
Preceded by	Nick Staikos
Succeeded by	Tim Richardson
Minister for Cost of Living
In office 15 April 2026 – 4 August 2026
Premier	Jacinta Allan
Preceded by	Position established
Succeeded by	Position abolished
Minister for Renters
In office 15 April 2026 – 4 August 2026
Premier	Jacinta Allan
Preceded by	Position established
Succeeded by	Tim Richardson
Minister for Men and Boys
In office 15 April 2026 – 4 August 2026
Premier	Jacinta Allan
Preceded by	Position established
Succeeded by	Position abolished

Member of the Victorian Legislative Assembly for Frankston
- Incumbent
- Assumed office 29 November 2014
- Preceded by: Geoff Shaw

Personal details
- Born: 5 December 1978 (age 47) Traralgon, Victoria, Australia
- Party: Labor
- Education: Monash University
- Occupation: Firefighter

Paul Andrew Edbrooke (born 5 December 1978) is an Australian politician. He has been a Labor Party member of the Victorian Legislative Assembly since November 2014, representing the Legislative Assembly seat of Frankston.

He was raised in the Latrobe Valley, with both parents highly active in the Salvation Army, and his father a Corps Sergeant Major. Edbrooke moved to Frankston in 2001, and now lives in Mount Eliza with his family.

Edbrooke is a former teacher and firefighter with the Country Fire Authority (CFA), based at Frankston fire station. He mostly taught in Special Developmental Schools.

Over fourteen years as a career firefighter, Edbrooke worked at some of the state's largest and most complex fires, including the Dandenong Dunlopillo factory fire, Black Saturday fires and the Morwell coal mine fire, where it is recorded that he was almost killed during a night shift. The platoon he worked on at Frankston Fire Station was once known as 'deadly D shift' due to the amount of trauma they attended. In 2009, he was awarded a Chief Officer's commendation for rescuing a victim from a house fire and resuscitating her with his platoon. Two persons were rescued and one firefighter hospitalised. In 2013 he was awarded a CFA service award. In 2014 he was awarded the National Service Medal (Black Saturday). Before being elected, Edbrooke was a United Firefighter's Union Shop Steward.

Edbrooke chaired the $63 million Frankston Transit Precinct Taskforce and currently chairs the same project's implementation governance board, which includes CEOs from South East Water, Peninsula Health, Chisholm TAFE and Monash University.

He is currently the Parliamentary Secretary for Police and Emergency Services and Parliamentary Secretary for Bushfire Recovery.

In January 2022, The Age reported that Edbrooke had saved the life of a seven-year-old drowning victim using cardiopulmonary resuscitation.

In 2023, Edbrooke survived a plane accident and resuscitated a man in separate incidents in the same week.

Victorian Legislative Assembly
Preceded by Geoff Shaw	Member for Frankston; 2014–present	Incumbent
