= Alistair Harkness =

Australian politician

Alistair Ross Harkness (born 7 August 1974, Melbourne) is a former Australian politician and member of the Victorian Legislative Assembly for the Labor Party.

== Early life ==
Harkness grew up in Frankston, Victoria, where he attended Frankston Heights Primary School. After completing high school at Mentone Grammar School, he was accepted to study at Monash University. In 1996, he graduated with a Bachelor of Business and a Bachelor of Arts, and received first class honours the following year. He went on to complete a PhD in political science, which he was awarded in 2005. His research on Victorian state politics and policy has been widely published.

Prior to entering Parliament, his career included working for Steve Bracks in his first term as Premier, as a lecturing associate at Monash University teaching in Australian politics, policy making and police studies, and on the galvanizing and paint lines at BHP Westernport. He supported himself prior to these roles in a variety of occupations, including as a sales assistant at Big W (Karingal).

Harkness married his wife, Tawny, in 2006, with whom he has one daughter.

== Political career ==
Harkness was elected as the Member for Frankston in the 2002 Victorian state election. At just 28 years old, this made him the youngest member in the Victorian Parliament. During his first term, he was a member of the Parliamentary Roads Safety Committee. He was re-elected at the 2006 election and served on the Parliamentary Education Committee. In office, Harkness listed his key areas of interest as road safety, education and the environment. He was defeated in the 2010 election, obtaining 47.93% of the vote after the distribution of preferences.

== After politics ==
He returned to academia in 2011, and was teaching and researching in Criminal Justice in the School of Applied Media and Social Sciences at Monash University. After Monash, he was teaching and researching within the School of Arts at Federation University Australia before joining the University of New England in 2020. Part of his research has focussed on the role and appointment process for police commissioners. In this regard, he has been a vocal critic of the Baillieu Government's conduct in relation to Victoria Police Commissioner Simon Overland.

Parliament of Victoria
Preceded by Andrea McCall	Member for Frankston; 2002–2010	Succeeded by Geoff Shaw
