= Maurice Graham (rugby union) =

NZ international rugby union player

- Born: Maurice Gordon Graham; 20 December 1931 Blayney, NSW, Australia
- Died: 10 December 2015 (aged 83) Canberra, ACT, Australia
- School: Grafton High School, Sydney
- Occupation: School teacher

Rugby union career
- Position: Fullback
Provincial / State sides
Years	Team	Apps	(Points)
- New South Wales
International career
Years	Team	Apps	(Points)
1960	New Zealand	0	(0)

Maurice Gordon Graham (20 December 1931 – 10 December 2015) was an Australian rugby union player who played one match for the New Zealand national team, the All Blacks, as a guest player against Queensland on the 1960 tour of Australia and South Africa. A fullback, Graham represented New South Wales at a state level, and played for Australian Colts in 1953.
