= 2015 Under 15 Girl's Australian Championships =

Tournament details
- Host country: Australia
- City: Gold Coast
- Teams: 12
- Venue(s): Keith Hunt Park

Final positions
- Champions: (Queensland) QLD 1
- Runner-up: (Western Australia) WA Gold
- Third place: (Queensland) QLD 2

Tournament statistics
- Matches played: 42
- Goals scored: 193 (4.6 per match)
- Top scorer(s): (South Australia) Hattie Shand (12 goals)

The 2014 Girl's Under 15 Australian Championships was a field hockey tournament held in the Gold Coast, Queensland between 11–19 April 2015.

QLD 1 won the gold medal by defeating WA Gold 2–1 in the final. QLD 2 won the bronze medal by defeating WA Black 3–2 in the third and fourth place playoff.

== Competition format ==
The tournament is divided into three pools, Pool A, Pool B and Pool C, consisting of four teams each, competing in a round-robin format.

At the conclusion of the pool stage, all four teams from Pool A, and the top two ranked teams from Pool B and Pool C advance to the medal round, while bottom ranked teams from Pool B and Pool C progress to the non medal round.

In Pools D, E and F, teams once again play in a round-robin format to determine playoff matches. The top two teams in Pool D and Pool E progress to the semi-finals, while the bottom two advance to the fifth to eighth place classification. At the conclusion of Pool F, teams play in crossover matches to determine classification matches.

== Teams ==
Unlike other National Australian Championships, teams from New South Wales, Queensland, Victoria and Western Australia are eligible to enter two teams.

- (Australian Capital Territory) ACT
- (New South Wales) NSW State
- (New South Wales) NSW Blue
- (Northern Territory) NT
- (Queensland) QLD 1
- (Queensland) QLD 2
- (South Australia) SA
- (Tasmania) TAS
- (Victoria (state)) VIC Blue
- (Victoria (state)) VIC White
- (Western Australia) WA Black
- (Western Australia) WA Gold

== Results ==
=== First round ===
==== Pool A ====
Pos	Team	Pld	W	D	L	GF	GA	GD	Pts	Qualification
1	(Queensland) QLD 1	3	3	0	0	12	3	+9	9	Advance to Medal Round
2	(Western Australia) WA Gold	3	1	1	1	7	6	+1	4	Advance to Medal Round
3	(New South Wales) NSW State	3	1	1	1	5	6	−1	4	Advance to Medal Round
4	(Victoria (state)) VIC Blue	3	0	0	3	2	11	−9	0	Advance to Medal Round

Source: Hockey Australia

11 April 2015
13:00

WA Gold (Western Australia)	1 – 4	(Queensland) QLD 1
Antonovich 44'	Report	Fitzpatrick 22', 28'; McIntyre 45'; Nicholls 53'

Keith Hunt Park
Umpires:
Cassidy Gallagher (AUS)
Zoe Nicol (AUS)

11 April 2015
13:30

NSW State (New South Wales)	2 – 1	(Victoria (state)) VIC Blue
Askey 61'; Schonell 65'	Report	Lyon 26'

Keith Hunt Park
Umpires:
Tracy Fischer (AUS)
Miranda McNamara (AUS)

12 April 2015
11:00

VIC Blue (Victoria (state))	1 – 5	(Queensland) QLD 1
Rennie 30'	Report	Nicholls 4', 64'; Smith 43'; Nolan 48'; McIntyre 55'

Keith Hunt Park
Umpires:
Kiahni Abell (AUS)
Zoe Nicol (AUS)

12 April 2015
11:30

NSW State (New South Wales)	2 – 2	(Western Australia) WA Gold
Schonell 13'; King-Venn 55'	Report	Rankin 9'; Herron 40'

Keith Hunt Park
Umpires:
Chantel Manhire (AUS)
Emily Ogden (AUS)

13 April 2015
15:00

QLD 1 (Queensland)	3 – 1	(New South Wales) NSW State
Smith 29', 57'; Ferguson 69'	Report	Sandy 40'

Keith Hunt Park
Umpires:
Kiahni Abell (AUS)
Miranda McNamara (AUS)

14 April 2015
15:30

WA Gold (Western Australia)	4 – 0	(Victoria (state)) VIC Blue
Snyman 2'; Barbetti 28', 54'; Herron 64'	Report

Keith Hunt Park
Umpires:
Tracey Fischer (AUS)
Chantel Manhire (AUS)

==== Pool B ====
Pos	Team	Pld	W	D	L	GF	GA	GD	Pts	Qualification
1	(Queensland) QLD 2	3	3	0	0	14	1	+13	9	Advance to Medal Round
2	(Victoria (state)) VIC White	3	1	1	1	7	8	−1	4	Advance to Medal Round
3	(South Australia) SA	3	1	1	1	6	7	−1	4	Non-Medal Round
4	(Australian Capital Territory) ACT	3	0	0	3	0	11	−11	0	Non-Medal Round

Source: Hockey Australia

11 April 2015
15:00

VIC White (Victoria (state))	1 – 5	(Queensland) QLD 2
Knowles 9'	Report	Humphreys 11', 16', 43'; Myers 28'; Best 42'

Keith Hunt Park
Umpires:
Kiahni Abell (AUS)
Chantel Manhire (AUS)

11 April 2015
15:30

ACT (Australian Capital Territory)	0 – 3	(South Australia) SA
	Report	Shand 18' de Broughe 35+'; Lewis 40'

Keith Hunt Park
Umpires:
Skye Yeatman (AUS)
Emily Ogden (AUS)

12 April 2015
13:00

ACT (Australian Capital Territory)	0 – 3	(Victoria (state)) VIC White
	Report	Knowles 35', 46'; Weingartner 60'

Keith Hunt Park
Umpires:
Miranda McNamara (AUS)
Meg Bourne (AUS)

12 April 2015
13:30

SA (South Australia)	0 – 4	(Queensland) QLD 2
	Report	Best 38'; Humphreys 51', 56'; Punch 65'

Keith Hunt Park
Umpires:
Cassidy Gallagher (AUS)
Emily Bowles (AUS)

13 April 2015
11:00

QLD 2 (Queensland)	5 – 0	(Australian Capital Territory) ACT
Humphreys 4', 28'; Staples 54'; Wilkinson 65', 67'	Report

Keith Hunt Park
Umpires:
Tracey Fischer (AUS)
Emily Ogden (AUS)

13 April 2015
11:30

VIC White (Victoria (state))	3 – 3	(South Australia) SA
Weingartner 16', 37'; Drummond 32'	Report	Cameron 4'; Shand 44', 67'

Keith Hunt Park
Umpires:
Emily Bowles (AUS)
Cassidy Gallagher (AUS)

==== Pool C ====
Pos	Team	Pld	W	D	L	GF	GA	GD	Pts	Qualification
1	(Western Australia) WA Black	3	3	0	0	10	2	+8	9	Advance to Medal Round
2	(New South Wales) NSW Blue	3	2	0	1	9	5	+4	6	Advance to Medal Round
3	(Tasmania) TAS	3	1	0	2	5	12	−7	3	Non-Medal Round
4	(Northern Territory) NT	3	0	0	3	5	10	−5	0	Non-Medal Round

Source: Hockey Australia

11 April 2015
11:00

NT (Northern Territory)	1 – 3	(Western Australia) WA Black
O'Halloran 53'	Report	Smith 12'; Monro 37'; Flynn 69'

Keith Hunt Park
Umpires:
Meg Bourne (AUS)
Emily Ogden (AUS)

11 April 2015
11:30

TAS (Tasmania)	1 – 5	(New South Wales) NSW Blue
Spandler 2'	Report	Dibley 7'; Callander 18', 48', 58'; Miller 31'

Keith Hunt Park
Umpires:
Emily Bowles (AUS)
Nicole Arthy (AUS)

12 April 2015
15:00

TAS (Tasmania)	0 – 5	(Western Australia) WA Black
	Report	Ameduri 10'; Smith 42', 45'; Bell 50'; Stroud 70+'

Keith Hunt Park
Umpires:
Skye Yeatman (AUS)
Nicole Arthy (AUS)

12 April 2015
15:30

NSW Blue (New South Wales)	3 – 2	(Northern Territory) NT
Dibley 8'; Clark 49'; Allan 61'	Report	Pumpa 2'; Gahan 64'

Keith Hunt Park
Umpires:
Tracey Fischer (AUS)
Zoe Nicol (AUS)

13 April 2015
13:00

WA Black (Western Australia)	2 – 1	(New South Wales) NSW Blue
Smith 10'; Flynn 53'	Report	Miller 7'

Keith Hunt Park
Umpires:
Nicole Arthy (AUS)
Skye Yeatman (AUS)

13 April 2015
13:30

NT (Northern Territory)	2 – 4	(Tasmania) TAS
Tchemjiri 46'; Simmons 56'	Report	Withington 9'; Berresford 22'; Bridley 38'; Revill 67'

Keith Hunt Park
Umpires:
Meg Bourne (AUS)
Zoe Nicol (AUS)

=== Medal round ===
==== Pool D ====
Pos	Team	Pld	W	D	L	GF	GA	GD	Pts	Qualification
1	(Queensland) QLD 1	3	3	0	0	14	3	+11	9	Advance to Semi-finals
2	(Queensland) QLD 2	3	2	0	1	8	7	+1	6	Advance to Semi-finals
3	(New South Wales) NSW State	3	1	0	2	7	5	+2	3	
4	(Victoria (state)) VIC White	3	0	0	3	2	16	−14	0	

Source: Hockey Australia

15 April 2015
13:00

NSW State (New South Wales)	0 – 2	(Queensland) QLD 2
	Report	Wilkinson 30'; Staples 49'

Keith Hunt Park
Umpires:
Tracey Fischer (AUS)
Zoe Nicol (AUS)

15 April 2015
15:00

QLD 1 (Queensland)	5 – 1	(Victoria (state)) VIC White
Mathison 18', 57'; Fitzpatrick 21'; Nicholls 43'; Nolan 67'	Report	Drummond 63'

Keith Hunt Park
Umpires:
Kiahni Abell (AUS)
Cassidy Gallagher (AUS)

16 April 2015
13:30

QLD 1 (Queensland)	6 – 1	(Queensland) QLD 2
Nicholls 32', 39'; Ferguson 43'; Fitzpatrick 49'; Nolan 57'; Brown 67'	Report	Punch 56'

Keith Hunt Park
Umpires:
Meg Bourne (AUS)
Emily Ogden (AUS)

16 April 2015
15:30

NSW State (New South Wales)	6 – 0	(Victoria (state)) VIC White
Askey 10', 64'; Schonell 34', 40', 51'; Kable 46'	Report

Keith Hunt Park
Umpires:
Kiahni Abell (AUS)
Miranda McNamara (AUS)

==== Pool E ====
Pos	Team	Pld	W	D	L	GF	GA	GD	Pts	Qualification
1	(Western Australia) WA Gold	3	3	0	0	11	0	+11	9	Advance to Semi-finals
2	(Western Australia) WA Black	3	2	0	1	5	6	−1	6	Advance to Semi-finals
3	(Victoria (state)) VIC Blue	3	1	0	2	5	9	−4	3	
4	(New South Wales) NSW Blue	3	0	0	3	3	9	−6	0	

Source: Hockey Australia

=== Non-Medal Round ===
==== Pool F ====
Pos	Team	Pld	W	D	L	GF	GA	GD	Pts
1	(South Australia) SA	3	3	0	0	11	0	+11	9
2	(Australian Capital Territory) ACT	3	2	0	1	7	7	0	6
3	(Tasmania) TAS	3	1	0	2	6	12	−6	3
4	(Northern Territory) NT	3	0	0	3	4	9	−5	0

Source: Hockey Australia

15 April 2015
11:00

SA (South Australia)	2 – 0	(Northern Territory) NT
Shand 3'; Finlay 21'	Report

Keith Hunt Park
Umpires:
Chantel Manhire (AUS)
Nicole Arthy (AUS)

15 April 2015
11:30

TAS (Tasmania)	2 – 4	(Australian Capital Territory) ACT
Williams 41'; Withington 60'	Report	S. Apps 13', 62'; Mason 17', 53'

Keith Hunt Park
Umpires:
Skye Yeatman (AUS)
Meg Bourne (AUS)

16 April 2015
11:00

SA (South Australia)	6 – 0	(Tasmania) TAS
McMahon 5'; Shand 12', 37', 52', 54', 59'	Report

Keith Hunt Park
Umpires:
Miranda McNamara (AUS)
Tracey FIscher (AUS)

16 April 2015
11:30

ACT (Australian Capital Territory)	3 – 2	(Northern Territory) NT
C. Apps 19'; Mason 23'; Cantrill 49'	Report	Broadway 9'; Gahan 16'

Keith Hunt Park
Umpires:
Zoe Nicol (AUS)
Nicole Arthy (AUS)

=== Classification matches ===
==== Ninth to twelfth place classification ====
Crossover
18 April 2015
(South Australia) SA	6
(Northern Territory) NT	0
18 April 2015
(Australian Capital Territory) ACT	1
(Tasmania) TAS	3

Ninth and tenth place
19 April 2015
(South Australia) SA	6
(Tasmania) TAS	1
Eleventh and twelfth place
19 April 2015
(Australian Capital Territory) ACT	0
(Northern Territory) NT	2

===== Crossover =====
18 April 2015
09:00

SA (South Australia)	6 – 0	(Northern Territory) NT
Shand 3'; Cameron 5' de Broughe 47'; Marwick 49'; Lewis 52'; McMahon 69'	Report

Keith Hunt Park
Umpires:
Kiahni Abell (AUS)
Tracey Fischer (AUS)

18 April 2015
11:00

ACT (Australian Capital Territory)	1 – 3	(Tasmania) TAS
James 7'	Report	Kenworthy 37'; Bridley 64', 70+'

Keith Hunt Park
Umpires:
Meg Bourne (AUS)
Nicole Arthy (AUS)

===== Eleventh and twelfth place =====
19 April 2015
09:00

ACT (Australian Capital Territory)	0 – 2	(Northern Territory) NT
	Report	Gahan 41', 46'

Keith Hunt Park
Umpires:
Emily Bowles (AUS)
Tracey Fischer (AUS)

===== Ninth and tenth place =====
19 April 2015
11:00

SA (South Australia)	6 – 1	(Tasmania) TAS
Cameron 2'; Shand 4', 32'; Jackson 9'; Marwick 15'; Lewis 29'	Report	Kenworthy 37'

Keith Hunt Park
Umpires:
Meg Bourne (AUS)
Skye Yeatman (AUS)

== Statistics ==
=== Final standings ===
Pos	Team	Pld	W	D	L	GF	GA	GD	Pts	Final Result
1st place, gold medalist(s)	(Queensland) QLD 1	7	7	0	0	27	7	+20	21	Gold Medal
2nd place, silver medalist(s)	(Western Australia) WA Gold	7	4	1	2	17	8	+9	13	Silver Medal
3rd place, bronze medalist(s)	(Queensland) QLD 2	7	5	0	2	20	11	+9	15	Bronze Medal
4	(Western Australia) WA Black	7	4	0	3	16	12	+4	12	Fourth Place
5	(New South Wales) NSW State	7	4	1	2	21	10	+11	13	Fifth place
6	(Victoria (state)) VIC Blue	7	2	0	5	14	23	−9	6	Sixth Place
7	(New South Wales) NSW Blue	7	2	1	4	13	17	−4	7	Seventh Place
8	(Victoria (state)) VIC White	7	1	2	4	11	26	−15	5	Eighth Place
9	(South Australia) SA	7	5	1	1	26	8	+18	16	Ninth Place
10	(Tasmania) TAS	7	2	0	5	11	29	−18	6	Tenth Place
11	(Northern Territory) NT	7	1	0	6	9	21	−12	3	Eleventh Place
12	(Australian Capital Territory) ACT	7	2	0	5	8	20	−12	6	Twelfth Place

Source: Hockey Australia
