= Paul Hutchison (Australian cricketer) =

Australian cricketer (1968–2015)

Personal information
- Full name: Paul James Hutchison
- Born: 17 February 1968; Glen Innes, New South Wales, Australia
- Died: 27 February 2015 (aged 47); Brisbane, Australia
- Batting: Right-handed
- Bowling: Right-arm fast-medium

Domestic team information
- Years: Team
- 1996/97–1997/98: Tasmania
- 1991/92–1994/95: South Australia

Career statistics
Competition	FC	LA
Matches	8	13
Runs scored	80	39
Batting average	8.00	39.00
100s/50s	–/–	–/–
Top score	14	22*
Balls bowled	1,329	660
Wickets	20	16
Bowling average	41.10	34.37
5 wickets in innings	1	1
10 wickets in match	–	–
Best bowling	5/87	5/27
Catches/stumpings	3/–	3/–
- Source: Cricinfo, 3 January 2011

Paul James Hutchison (17 February 1968 – 27 February 2015) was a professional Australian cricketer who played for Tasmania and South Australia. He was born in Glen Innes, New South Wales

Hutchison also played for Queensland Country and Queensland academy, as well as playing club cricket in the Northern Territory. Hutchison had two sons, Mitchell and James who often visited during his debut performances while playing professionally for South Australia and Tasmania.

Hutchison died in Brisbane on 27 February 2015 of cancer.

== See also ==
- List of Tasmanian representative cricketers
