= Norm Armstrong (footballer) =

Australian rules footballer

Personal information
- Full name: Norman Thomas Armstrong
- Born: 2 July 1925
- Died: 18 May 2015 (aged 89)
- Original team: Braybrook
- Height: 170 cm (5 ft 7 in)
- Weight: 75 kg (165 lb)

Playing career^{1}
Years	Club	Games (Goals)
1947–48	Footscray	4 (1)
- ^{1} Playing statistics correct to the end of 1948.

Norman Thomas Armstrong (2 July 1925 – 18 May 2015) was an Australian rules footballer who played with Footscray in the Victorian Football League (VFL).
