= Bob McLean (winemaker) =

Australian winemaker

Bob McLean (27 September 1947 – 9 April 2015) was an Australian winemaker known as a key promoter of Australian wine abroad. He died of liver cancer on 9 April 2015, aged 67.
