= Andrea McCall =

Australian politician

Andrea Lea McCall (born 16 March 1952) is a former Australian politician. She was the Liberal member for Frankston in the Victorian Legislative Assembly from 1996 to 2002.

McCall was born in Yorkshire, England, and was educated at Harrogate. She received a Bachelor of Arts from the Universite de Lyon in 1972, and a Business Diploma from the French Institute in London in 1973. In 1976 she received a Graduate Diploma from London Polytec. She worked as a marketing advisor from 1977 to 1981, and in 1983 moved to Australia, where she became a personnel consultant; in that year she also joined the Liberal Party. From 1984 to 1990 she was proprietor of the McCall Group, and from 1990 to 1995 was a lecturer at VUT in Footscray.

In 1996, McCall was elected as the Liberal member for Frankston in the Victorian Legislative Assembly. She was a member of the Law Reform Committee (6 September 2000 – 5 November 2002) and House Committee (14 December 1999 – 5 November 2002). She was chair of the Women's Action Plan Consultative Committee from 1998 to 1999. In 2002, she was defeated by Labor candidate Alistair Harkness.

Parliament of Victoria
Preceded by Graeme Weideman	Member for Frankston; 1996–2002	Succeeded by Alistair Harkness
