= Graham Gilchrist =

Australian rules footballer

Personal information
- Full name: Norman Graham Gilchrist
- Born: 14 August 1932
- Died: 24 June 2015 (aged 82)
- Original team: Coburg High School
- Height: 180 cm (5 ft 11 in)
- Weight: 73 kg (161 lb)

Playing career^{1}
Years	Club	Games (Goals)
1952–1961	Carlton	114 (26)
- ^{1} Playing statistics correct to the end of 1961.

Graham Gilchrist (14 August 1932 – 24 June 2015) was an Australian rules footballer who played for Carlton from 1952 to 1961.

He captained the Under 19 team to a premiership in 1951, and played in the reserves premiership team in 1952.
