= David Rolfe =

Australian Paralympic swimmer (1964–2015)

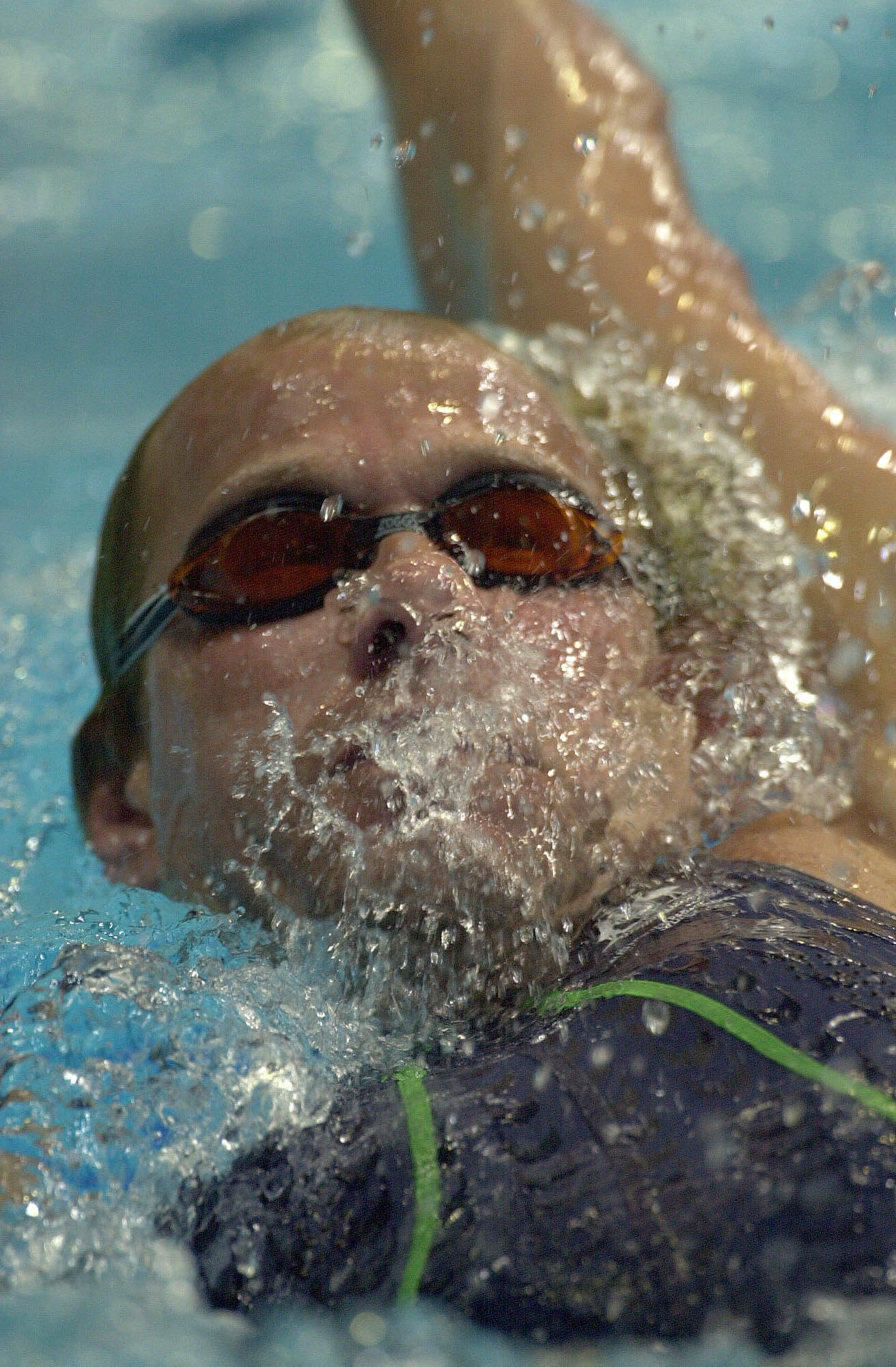
- Action shot of Rolfe doing backstroke in the 200 m medley SM9 at the 2000 Summer Paralympics

Personal information
- Nationality: Australia
- Born: 26 June 1964 Inverell, New South Wales
- Died: 7 January 2015 (aged 50) Gold Coast, Queensland
Medal record
Swimming
Paralympic Games
Bronze medal – third place	2000 Sydney	Men's 4x100 m Medley 34 pts

David John Rolfe (26 June 1964 – 7 January 2015) was a leg amputee Paralympic swimming and paracanoe competitor from Australia. He won a bronze medal at the 2000 Sydney Games in the Men's 4 × 100 m Medley 34 pts swimming event. He also competed in paracanoe world championship events.

== Personal ==
Rolfe was born on 26 June 1964 in Inverell, New South Wales. and was residing on the Gold Coast, Queensland. On 5 August 1993, he was involved in a head on car accident with a semi-trailer truck after falling asleep at the wheel. The accident resulted in Rolfe becoming above-the-knee right leg amputee. Whilst recuperating in hospital, Sydney won the right to host the 2000 Summer Paralympics and this led to Rolfe's determination to compete at the Games. On 7 January 2015, Rolfe died as the result of complications following three heart surgeries over the past year. He was father to Eli and Laban. Outside of swimming and canoeing, Rolfe enjoyed cycling, rock climbing and sailing.

== Swimming ==
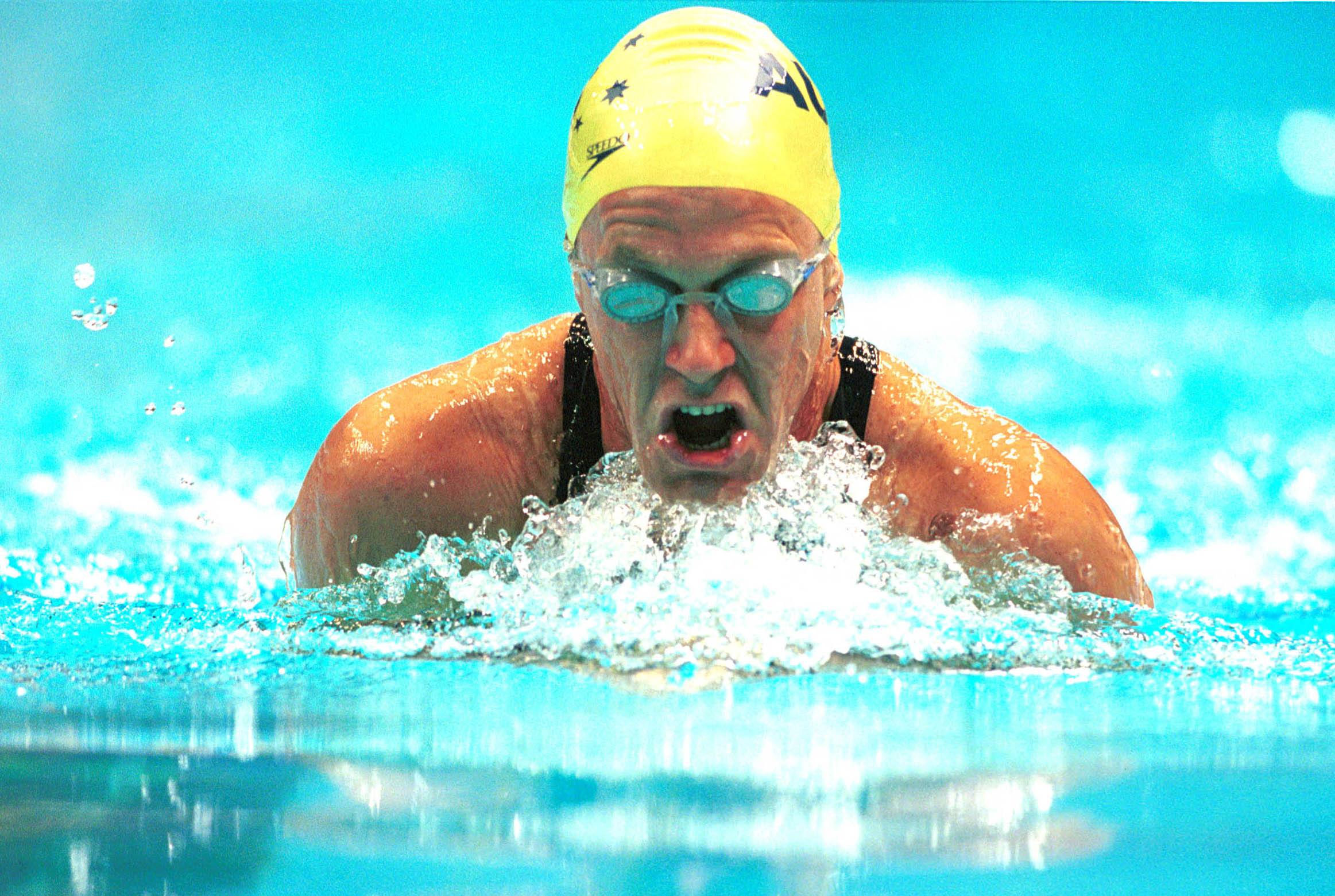
Close up action shot of Rolfe swimming, 2000 Summer Paralympics

Rolfe made his international debut at the 1998 IPC Swimming World Championships. At the 2000 Sydney Games, he won a bronze medal in the Men's 4 × 100 m Medley 34 pts event. He competed in three other events – Men's 100 m Backstroke S9, Men's 100 m Breaststroke SB8 and Men's 200 m Medley SM9 but did not medal. At the 2000 Sydney Games, Rolfe was one of the oldest athletes (36 at the time of the games) and as a result he played a large role in bringing the team together and mentoring the younger athletes. He discontinued swimming three years after the Sydney Games.

== Canoeing ==
Rolfe first started whitewater paddling in 1991 and was for several years a white water rafting guide. Rolfe was coached by Andrea Wood and based out of the Gold Coast Canoe Club. He returned to canoeing in 2009 as a para-canoeist with the aim of competing the 2016 Rio Games where para-canoeing was making its debut. In the lead up to this event, Rolfe was one of the sport's greatest advocates and even appeared in an International Canoe Federation video to promote the sport. In 2010, Rolfe stated that "I had been water rafting and white water kayaking before my accident but because kayaking wasn't anywhere near Paralympic status then, I took up swimming which was the only other water sport in the programme". Rolfe was Australia's first paracanoe representative at world championships level when he competed in the Men's LTA K1 at the 2010 ICF Canoe Sprint World Championships in Poznań, Poland. He also competed at the 2011 ICF Canoe Sprint World Championships
