= Electoral district of Frankston South =

Former state electoral district of Victoria, Australia

Frankston South Victoria—Legislative Assembly
- State: Victoria
- Created: 1985
- Abolished: 1992
- Demographic: Outer metropolitan
- Coordinates: 38°11′S 145°08′E

The Electoral district of Frankston South was an electoral district of the Legislative Assembly in the Australian state of Victoria. It was formed in 1985 when population increases in the Frankston area saw the Electoral district of Frankston divided into Frankston North and Frankston South. Both were abolished in 1992, with Frankston South mostly replaced by a recreated Frankston.

== Members ==
Member	Party	Term
Graeme Weideman	Liberal	1985–1992
