= Lindsay Collins (geologist) =

Australian geologist (1944-2015)

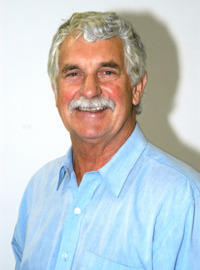
Lindsay Boyd Collins

Lindsay Boyd Collins (19 February 1944 – 2 September 2015) was an Australian marine geologist and sedimentologist, and a faculty member in the Department of Applied Geology at Curtin University in Western Australia. He was interested in studying the continental shelf of Western Australia and coral reefs. Collins was a prominent scholar, and completed projects on continental shelf mapping of Australian shelves, microbialites and seagrass banks at Shark Bay, and coral reef studies at the Abrolhos, Ningaloo, Scott Reef, the Rowley Shoals and the Kimberley.

== Early life and education ==
Collins was born in 1944 in Western Australia. Growing up as a child in his grandparents' place south of Perth and being fascinated by things happening in the ocean nearby, he loved the ocean and dreamed of being a marine scientist from a young age. Collins became interested in marine geology when he visited Shark Bay, 800 kilometres (500 mi) north of Perth, and loving its coral reefs and their beautiful environment he wanted to learn more about its structure. He obtained his BSc (Hons) in Geology in 1967 and his PhD on continental shelf sedimentation in 1983, both at the University of Western Australia.

== Career ==
In 1971 Collins began working at Curtin University, then the Western Australian Institute of Technology (WAIT), as a Lecturer in Geology. After gaining his PhD he became the Geology coordinator in the Department of Geology and Geophysics in 1984. In 1988 Collins was promoted to Senior Lecturer in Geology (Sedimentology), became Associate Professor in 1993, and in 2009 Professor of Sedimentary and Marine Geology in the Department of Applied Geology. He was Head of Department from 1999 until 2005, but continued to teach the second- and third-year sedimentology courses. During his tenure as Head of Department, Collins led the third-year field trip and was a key figure in the development of the department's double degrees.

The research interests of Collins at Curtin University included,

- continental shelf sedimentology and substrate mapping,
- the coral reefs of the Western Australian continental margin,
- clastic and carbonate petroleum reservoirs,
- coastal mapping for management using remote sensing and GIS,
- sea level change,
- tertiary limestone deposition and evolution,
- stromatolites, and
- warm and cool water carbonates.

His most recent research focused on Shark Bay, with which he had a long association, and the little known coral reefs of the Kimberley.

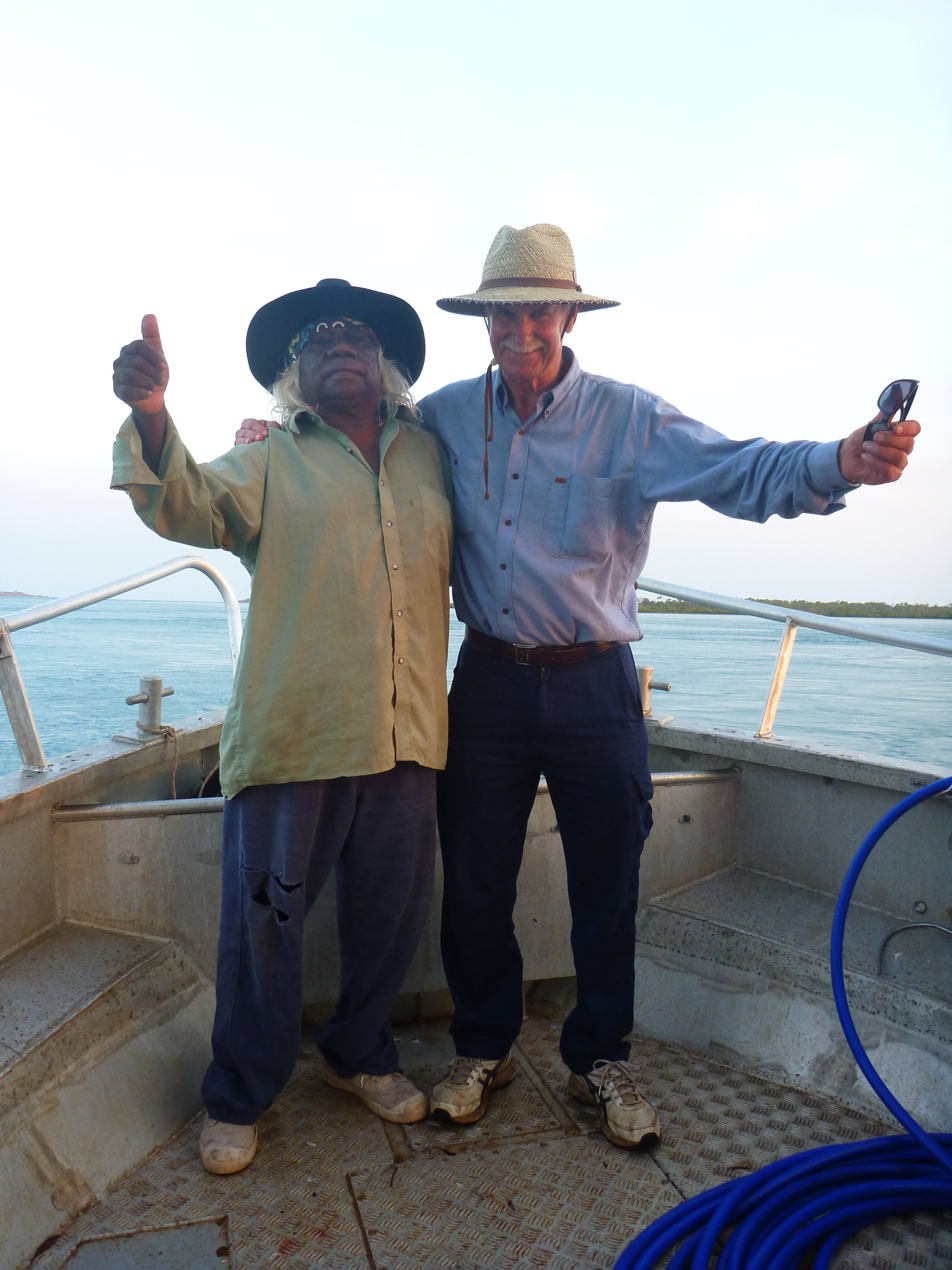
Lindsay with a traditional owner of Kimberley land

Collins also worked in petroleum exploration as a specialist sedimentologist, and as a researcher in continental shelf, coral reef and coastal geology, specialising in carbonate sedimentation. On several occasions he was Chief Scientist aboard the Franklin, a national research vessel. Collins served as Assistant Director of the Cooperative Research Centre for Landscape Environments and Mineral Exploration (CRC LEME), and Head of Applied Geology for six years. Up until his death he was a member of the Australia-New Zealand Science Council for the Integrated Ocean Drilling Program (IODP) and a Project Leader for the Western Australian Marine Science Institution (WAMSI) Kimberley Research Program. A long association with Shark Bay led to the Curtin Shark Bay Project and the Caring for Our Country Shark Bay Project.

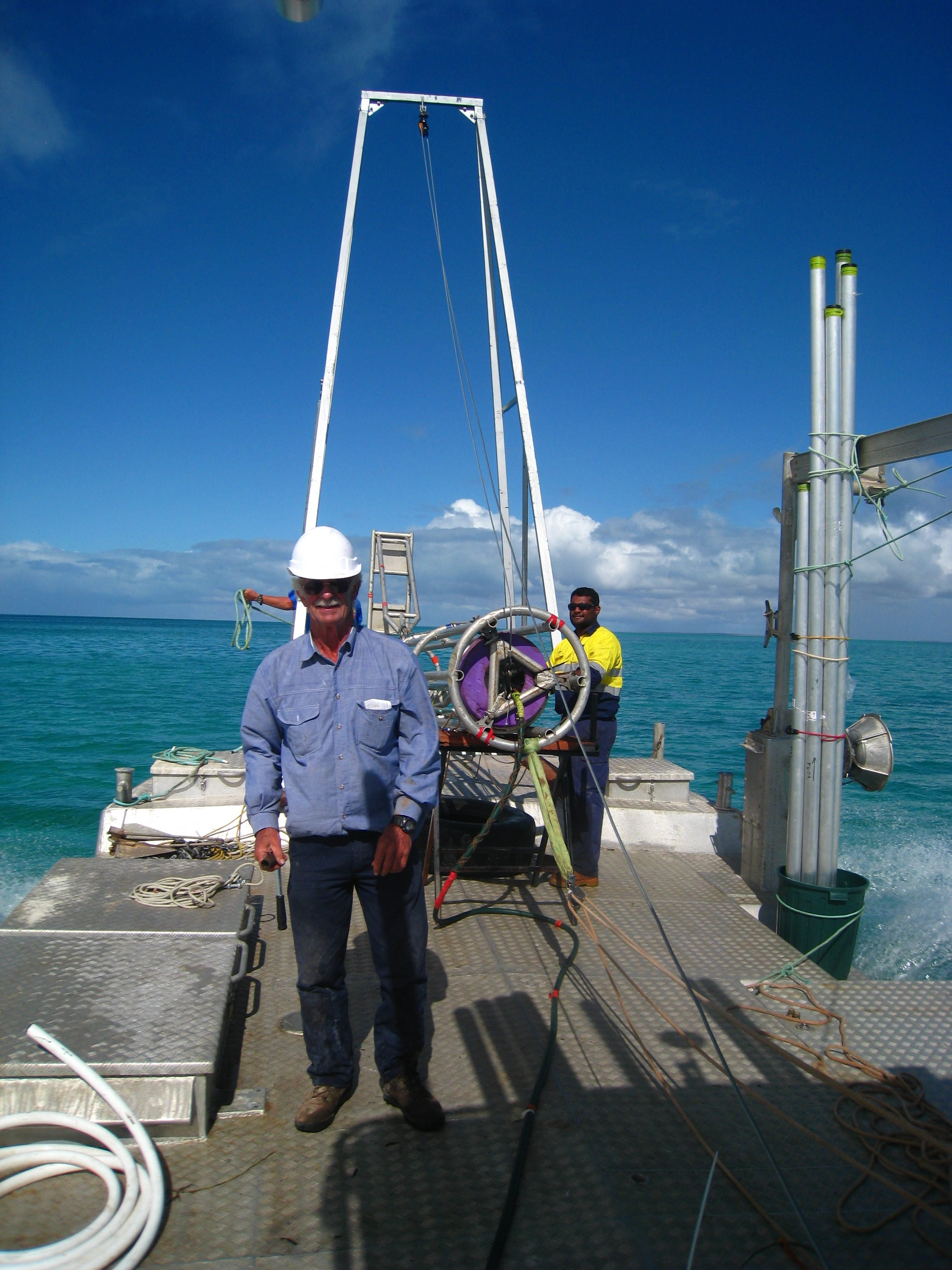
Lindsay during coring survey on the Faure Sill, Shark Bay

Recent projects included investigating

- coastal vulnerability at Geraldton Port and in the Mid-West region,
- the evolution of Stromatolites and Thrombolites in coastal embayments and lakes,
- growth history of coral reef systems of Australia’s western margin,
- controlling influences on the variability of reefal and carbonate system and
- continental shelf, slope and coastal processes and sediments.

Recent research sponsors included the Western Australian Marine Science Institute (WAMSI), Woodside Energy, the Department of Transport (Marine), and Petrobras.

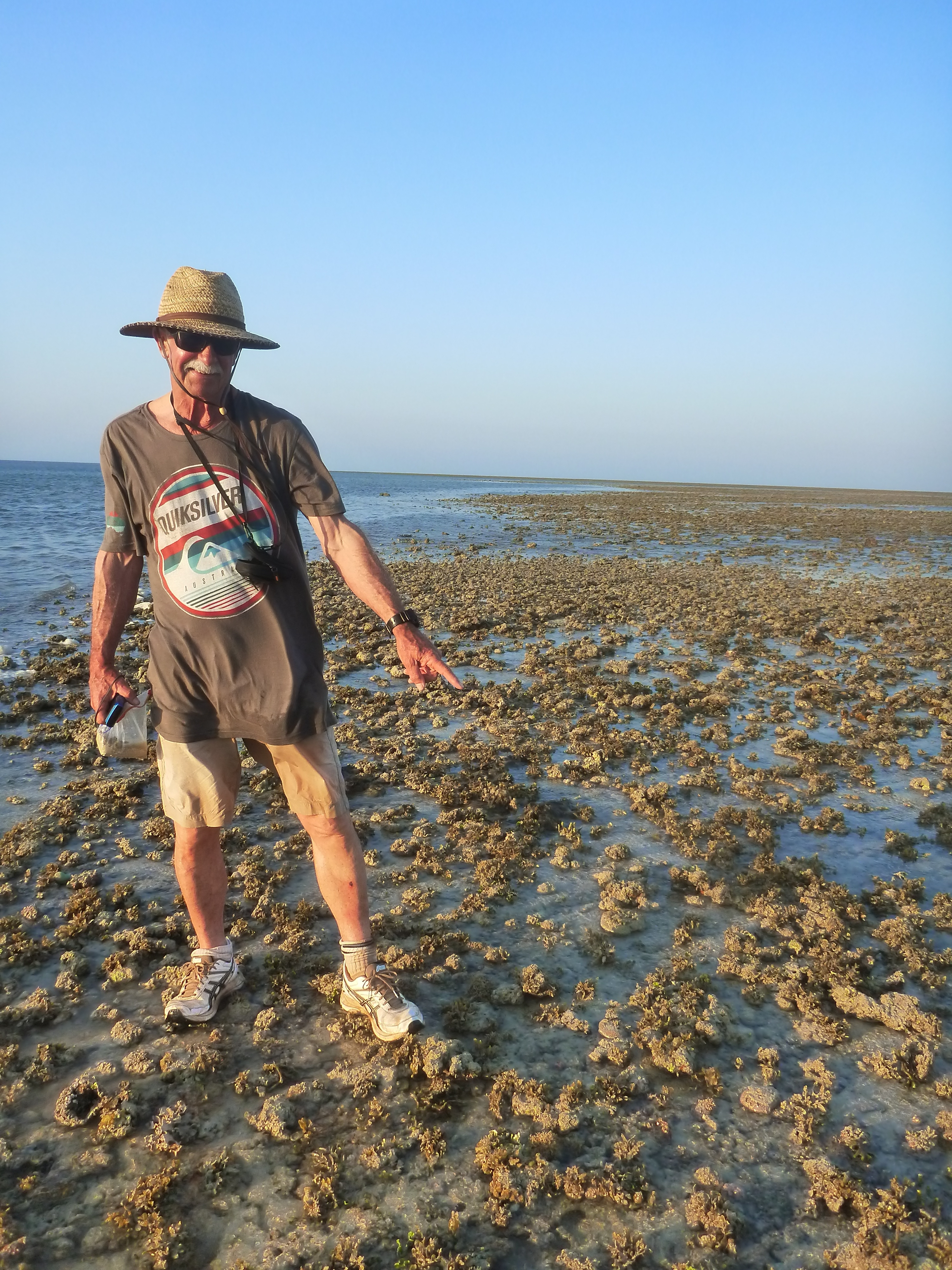
Collins on Adele Reef

He had a long history at Curtin University, and was involved in teaching, research, and several years as Head of Department. In the more than 40 years with the university, he taught thousands of undergraduate students, supervised more than 40 honours and postgraduate students, produced over 90 peer reviewed papers and reports, and led or co-investigated on at least 20 grants and consultancies worth almost A$11 million.

== Death ==
Collins died on 2 September 2015 at the age of 71. He is buried in Karrakatta Cemetery.

== See also ==
- ORCID
- Google Scholar
- Scopus Author Identifier
- Research Gate
