= Geoff Shaw (politician) =

Australian politician

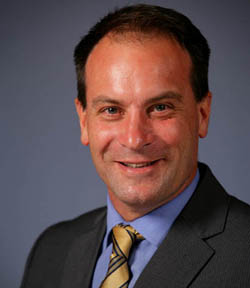
- Shaw in 2010

Member of the Victorian Legislative Assembly for Frankston
- In office 27 November 2010 – 29 November 2014
- Preceded by: Alistair Harkness
- Succeeded by: Paul Edbrooke

Leader of the United Australia Party in Victoria
- Incumbent
- Assumed office 12 October 2022
- Leader: Craig Kelly

Personal details
- Born: Geoffrey Page Shaw; 12 October 1967 (age 59) Brisbane, Queensland
- Party: United Australia Party (2015–current)
- Other political affiliations: Independent (2013–2015); Liberal (2010–13)
- Spouse: Bianca Shaw
- Education: John Paul College
- Alma mater: Monash University
- Profession: Accountant

Geoffrey Page Shaw (born 12 October 1967) is an Australian politician who represented Frankston in the Victorian Legislative Assembly from 2010 to 2014. He was initially a member of the Parliamentary Liberal Party until March 2013, before becoming an independent politician. In March 2014, Shaw resigned as a member of the Liberal Party as moves were being made to expel him from the party.

In September 2013, allegations were made that Shaw had misused his parliamentary vehicle for private purposes. In May 2014, the Legislative Assembly's Privileges Committee found the allegations were substantiated. Shaw was suspended from Parliament for eleven sitting days with effect in June 2014, ordered to pay a fine of A$6,838, and ordered to apologise to the Parliament upon his return. Shaw's suspension followed a period of political instability in the Victorian Parliament.

In October 2022, United Australia Party founder Clive Palmer announced that Shaw would lead the party's ticket for the 2022 Victorian state election and would run as a candidate for the Victorian Legislative Council in the Northern Victoria Region. Shaw cited frustration with the current Labor government and "the leadership of Daniel Andrews" as reasons for returning to state politics.

== Early life ==
Shaw attended John Paul College in Frankston, Victoria, graduating in 1985. He then attended Monash University where he attained a Bachelor of Business Accounting in 1988 and entered his own small business as a certified accountant and financial planner.

In 1992, Shaw was charged with and found guilty of assault after breaking a man's ribs while working as a nightclub bouncer. He was fined and placed on a good behaviour bond, but no conviction was recorded. The victim's wife stated Shaw threw her husband down two flights of stairs, and also pushed her into a gutter.

== Political career ==
=== Liberal politician ===
Shaw entered politics at the 2010 Victorian state election where he defeated the incumbent Labor member Alistair Harkness.

In April 2011, Shaw wrote to a homosexual constituent suggesting "his desire to love who he wanted was as illegitimate as a dangerous driver wanting to speed or a child molester wanting to molest". The constituent had written to Shaw objecting to the government's renewal of religious organisations' exemption under anti-discrimination legislation. The Victorian Equal Opportunity and Human Rights Commission stated Shaw's comments were "wrong and potentially dangerous". Shaw was forced to apologise over the incident.

In August 2011, Shaw was involved in a roadside fight in his electorate; it was alleged that he was involved in a conversation between a police officer and another driver, with an exchange of words developing into a physical altercation, with injuries to the other driver.

In addition to his parliamentary duties, Shaw has run two small businesses including an accounting firm, Geoff Shaw & Partners, in Frankston; and Southern Cross Hardware, a hardware factory in Carrum Downs. In May 2012, it was alleged that Shaw's parliamentary car was being used for business purposes for hardware factory. Shaw claimed his staff used the vehicle without his knowledge, however, several whistleblowers said they remembered Shaw driving the car himself. Baillieu announced he had referred the case to the Speaker of the Victorian Legislative Assembly and the Department of Parliamentary Services to examine the use of Shaw's parliamentary entitlements. In September 2013, criminal charges were brought against Shaw. Prosecutors dropped the charges in December and referred to the Legislative Assembly's Privileges Committee. In May 2014, the Privileges Committee found that Shaw was not diligent in the management of his parliamentary vehicle; that he allowed individuals connected with his private business to use his parliamentary vehicle with little or no supervision; that he enabled the use of his parliamentary vehicle for commercial purposes and his parliamentary fuel card to purchase fuel for his private vehicle; and that he contravened the code of conduct for members as set out in Members of Parliament (Register of Interests) Act, 1978 (VIC) s 3.

=== Independent politician ===
In March 2013, Shaw resigned from the parliamentary Liberal Party, announcing that he would sit in the Legislative Assembly on the crossbenches as an independent politician. In the wake of the release of secret police tapes, Shaw refused to commit to supporting the government if Baillieu remained Premier. Baillieu subsequently resigned as Premier the following day. Ports Minister Denis Napthine succeeded Baillieu as Premier and stated that Shaw would not be endorsed by the Liberal Party as a candidate for the 2014 state election.

In October 2013, Shaw was involved in a physical altercation on the front steps of Parliament House. His arrival for Question Time coincided with a protest by taxi drivers in front of the House.

In November 2013. Australian media reported that Premier Napthine had 'secretly assisted' Shaw to draft a Private Member's Bill to change state abortion legislation. Napthine refuted the allegations and stated his Government had no plans to change abortion laws, nor would he support any such change. Shaw reportedly planned to introduce the bill before the 2014 state election. In June 2014 Napthine stated "while I am Premier of this state, I will not allow Mr Shaw to introduce any legislation seeking to change the abortion laws in Victoria."

Following the findings in May 2014 that Shaw had contravened the code of conduct for members regarding the use of his parliamentary vehicle, Shaw told radio station 774 ABC Melbourne on 3 June 2014 that he would support a no confidence motion in the Napthine Government. Initial indications were that both the Labor state opposition and the Napthine government would seek to evict Shaw from the Victorian Parliament due to misuse of parliamentary privilege. On 11 June 2014 following an extended debate, the Members of the Victorian Legislative Assembly were asked to discipline Shaw by expelling him from Parliament. Following a division of the assembly that was deadlocked 42 all, with Shaw absent from the floor of the chamber for the debate, the speaker Christine Fyffe used her casting vote to defeat the motion. A subsequent motion was proposed by a Liberal member that "...the Member for Frankston be suspended from the service of this House for eleven sitting days." The motion was carried without division. Shaw was required to pay his fine by 2 September or face expulsion.

=== Return to state politics, United Australia Party candidate ===
On 12 October 2022 United Australia Party founder Clive Palmer announced that Shaw would lead the party's ticket for the 2022 Victorian state election and would run as a candidate for the Victorian Legislative Council in the Northern Victoria Region. Shaw cited frustration with the current Labor government and "the leadership of Daniel Andrews" as reasons for returning to state politics. The UAP won no seats in the election, receiving only 0.83% of first preference votes.

== Personal life ==
Shaw separated from his first wife, with whom he had four children, in 2011. In 2012, Shaw admitted to writing a sign on the back of one his election posters aimed at his estranged wife, which stated "Please forgive me, I love you Sally: Psalm 42:1". Shaw placed the sign on a busy road near his former partner's home. During Shaw's separation from his wife, police had to be called when he caused distress to his family by refusing to leave their home. Shaw married a woman named Bianca in 2014.

Shaw is an active Christian. He is a member of Peninsula City Church, a megachurch in Frankston. He once told 7.30, "I'm a Christian first and an MP is me—just what I do." In his maiden speech to the Victorian parliament, he acknowledged "the original owner of the land on which we stand—God, the Creator, the God of Abraham, Isaac and Jacob, the God of the Bible."

Victorian Legislative Assembly
Preceded by Alistair Harkness	Member for Frankston; 2010–2014	Succeeded by Paul Edbrooke
