= Anna Stewart (activist) =

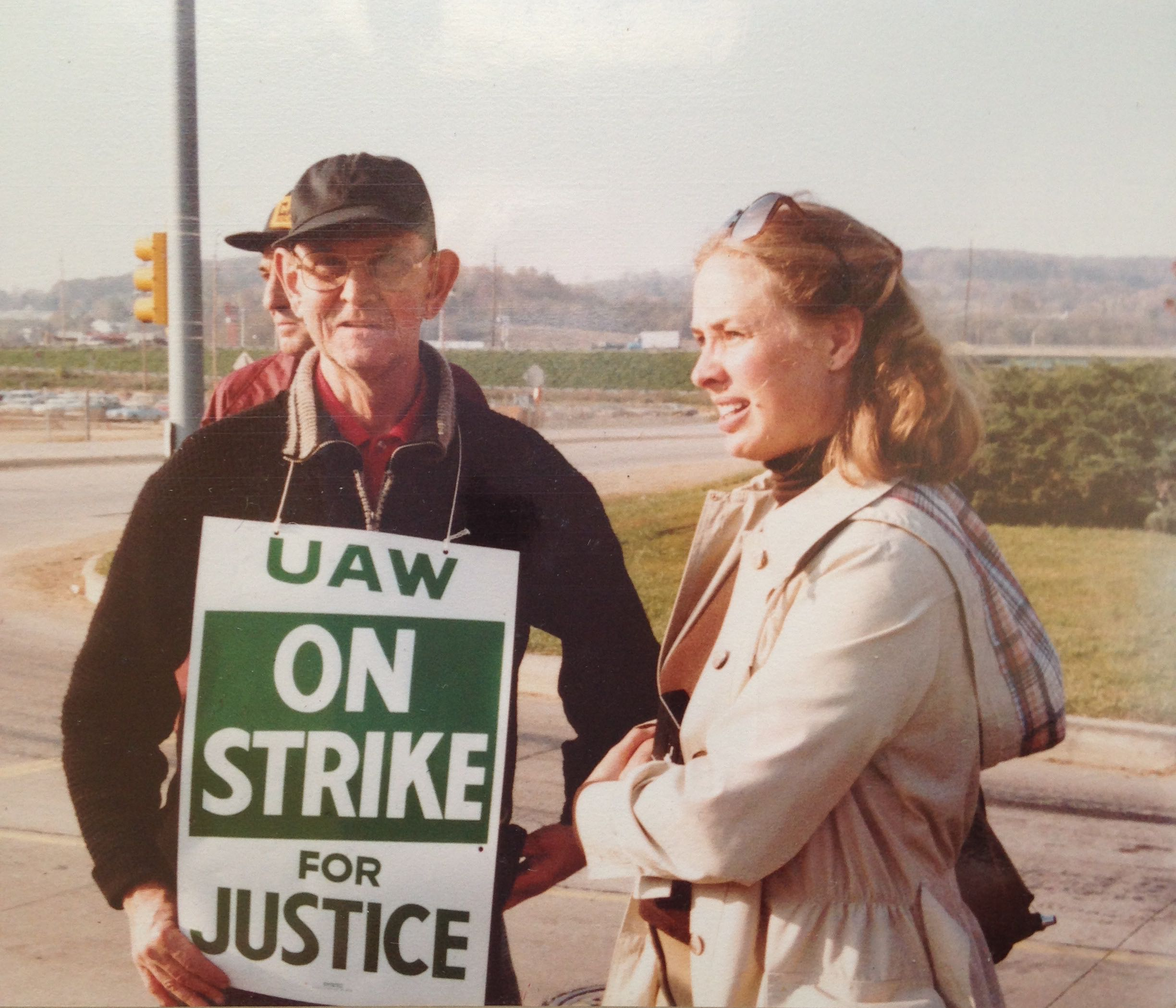
- Anna Stewart c. 1980
- Born: March 11, 1947; Adelaide, Australia
- Died: April 12, 1983 (aged 36); Melbourne, Australia
- Education: St.Margarets Grammar School Berwick, Victoria, Australia
- Occupations: Journalist, trade union advocate, feminist
- Awards: Victorian Honour Roll of Women (2001)

Anna Stewart (1947–1983) was an Australian feminist, unionist, and activist.

== Early life ==
Born and raised with her brother Paul in the city of Adelaide, South Australia, Stewart completed her schooling at St Margaret's Grammar School in Berwick, Victoria, Australia. On leaving school she worked as a journalist for the newspapers Nation Review, The Sun (The Sun News-Pictorial) and The Age in Melbourne, Victoria, Australia where she met her future husband, Jeremy Salt. In 1966, Stewart left Australia for Beirut, Lebanon where she and Jeremy, who was already there, lived in the mountain village of Souk El Gharb. Later that year they moved to London, UK, where they both worked as journalists until their return to Australia two years later.

== Career ==
In the early 1970s, Stewart moved from journalism into research and advocacy for the union movement. Anna successfully spearheaded the first Australian blue collar union campaign for maternity leave award provisions, in her capacity as Industrial Advocate for the Federated Furnishing Trades Society of Australia. At the time she was in the late stages of pregnancy with her third child.

In 1975, Stewart moved to the Victorian branch of the Vehicle Builders' Employees' Federation of Australia where she fought for childcare facilities in car plants, researched and argued work value cases, initiated campaigns against sexual harassment, compelling employers to recognise sexual harassment as an industrial issue, and assisted with the Australian Council of Trade Unions Maternity Leave Test Case, regarded as a breakthrough in winning the right of working women to 52 weeks of unpaid maternity leave and the right to return to the same job.

Stewart was a founding member of the Australian Council of Trade Unions Women's Committee established in 1977 and worked tirelessly on programs to be incorporated into the Working Women's Charter. She emphasised the key demand made by the ACTU Working Women's Charter for the increased involvement of women within the structures of the union movement. As Senior Federal Industrial Officer with the Municipal Officers' Association, today merged with other unions, she initiated women's committees in most state branches of the union and developed strong policies in relation to women workers.

Beyond her trade union commitments, Stewart also stood as a candidate for the Australian Labor Party in the Legislative Assembly seat of Frankston, Victoria, for the 1979 Victorian state election where she won 42,8% of the vote and a +5.5 point swing in a traditionally conservative seat. In 1980 she was international delegate to the annual meeting of the American Federation of Labor and Congress of Industrial Organizations organised at the White House in Washington, D.C. under the auspices of President Jimmy Carter. During this trip she also visited UAW picket lines.

After her death in 1983, her landmark achievements in the struggle for the rights of working women were acknowledged in the launching of the Anna Stewart Memorial Project. The inaugural program was coordinated by the Municipal Officers' Association, Victoria, in April 1984, and was conceived as an annual two week "on the job" training program for women unionists. In 2014 the project celebrated its 30th anniversary and is now, in 2026, in its 42nd year.

In 2001, Stewart was posthumously inducted to the Victorian Honour Roll of Women.
