= Electoral district of Frankston North =

Former electoral district of the Legislative Assembly in Victoria, Australia

Frankston North Victoria—Legislative Assembly
- State: Victoria
- Created: 1985
- Abolished: 1992
- Demographic: Outer metropolitan
- Coordinates: 38°08′S 145°08′E

The Electoral district of Frankston North was an electoral district of the Legislative Assembly in the Australian state of Victoria. It was formed in 1985 when population increases in the Frankston area saw the Electoral district of Frankston divided into Frankston North and Frankston South, but absorbed back into Frankston in 1992.

== Members ==
Member	Party	Term
Jane Hill	Labor	1985–1992
