= Electoral district of Frankston =

State electoral district of Victoria, Australia

Frankston Victoria—Legislative Assembly
- Interactive map of electoral district boundaries from the 2022 state election
- State: Victoria
- Dates current: 1967–1985; 1992–present
- MP: Paul Edbrooke
- Party: Labor
- Namesake: Frankston
- Electors: 44,458 (2018)
- Area: 43 km^{2} (16.6 sq mi)
- Demographic: Outer metropolitan
- Coordinates: 38°10′S 145°08′E
Electorates around Frankston:
Port Phillip	Carrum	Carrum
Port Phillip	Frankston	Hastings
Mornington	Mornington	Hastings

The electoral district of Frankston is an electoral district of the Victorian Legislative Assembly. It currently includes the suburbs of Frankston and Frankston South south east of Melbourne.

The electorate was first created prior to the 1967 election and the Liberal Party held the seat until the Cain landslide of 1982. Population increases, however, meant the seat was abolished in 1985 and replaced by two electorates—Frankston South and Frankston North.

In 1992, Frankston South was replaced mostly by a recreated Frankston. It became very safe for the Liberal Party, who won it with margins well over 10%.

However the adjoining Labor-held seat of Frankston East—which had been created mostly out of the old Frankston North—was abolished prior to the 2002 election and much of its territory was incorporated into the seat. The old Frankston had a comfortably safe Liberal majority of 10.7 percent, but the redistribution reduced it to a quite marginal 3.2 percent. Labor's Alistair Harkness won the seat on a large swing, part of the Labor landslide at the 2002 election. He was returned at the 2006 election with a reduced majority, but was defeated in 2010 by Geoff Shaw.

== Members for Frankston ==
First incarnation (1967–1985)
Member	Party	Term
Edward Meagher	Liberal	1967–1976
Graeme Weideman	Liberal	1976–1982
Jane Hill	Labor	1982–1985
Second incarnation (1992–present)
Member	Party	Term
Graeme Weideman	Liberal	1992–1996
Andrea McCall	Liberal	1996–2002
Alistair Harkness	Labor	2002–2010
Geoff Shaw	Liberal	2010–2013
Geoff Shaw	Independent	2013–2014
Paul Edbrooke	Labor	2014–present

== Election results ==
2022 Victorian state election: Frankston
Party	Candidate	Votes	%	±%
Labor	Paul Edbrooke	16,595	41.6	−4.8
Liberal	Michael O'Reilly	11,762	29.4	−2.9
Greens	Emily Green	5,060	12.7	+5.0
Freedom	Dragan Suric	1,443	3.6	+3.6
Liberal Democrats	Chrysten Abraham	1,420	3.6	+3.6
Animal Justice	Elizabeth Johnston	1,365	3.4	+0.6
Family First	Richard Brown	1,083	2.7	+2.7
Ind. (Australia One)	Darren Paul Bergwerf	844	2.1	+2.1
Independent	Henry Kelsall	369	0.9	–1.0
Total formal votes		39,941	95.3	+0.6
Informal votes		2,323	5.5	−0.6
Turnout		42,264	86.0	−1.4
Two-party-preferred result
Labor	Paul Edbrooke	23,429	58.7	−1.5
Liberal	Michael O'Reilly	16,512	41.3	+1.5
Labor hold		Swing	−1.5	

=== Graphical summary ===
Two-party preferred results in Frankston. View source data.

== 2026 State Election ==
The seat of Frankston is up for election in the 2026 Victorian State Election.he seat is currently held by Paul Edbrooke (ALP) since 2014.

There is a total of 11 candidates running for the seat, 3 of which are independents.

All major parties are contesting the seat at the upcoming election

=== Candidates for the seat of Frankston ===
Party	Candidate		Since
ALP	Paul Edbrooke	Current	2014
LNP	Bree Ambry		2026
ONP	Paul Stafford		2026
GRN	Katie Goulas		2026
AJP	Julie Harman		N/A
FFP	Peter Nicholes		N/A
LCA	Jeffrey Knipe		N/A
VS	Andrew Cheeseman		N/A
IND	Henry Kelsall		N/A
IND	Nicole Barry		N/A
IND	Chrysten Abraham		N/A
