= Jane Hill (politician) =

Australian politician

Member of the Victorian Legislative Assembly for Frankston North
- In office 2 March 1985 – 2 October 1992
- Preceded by: District created
- Succeeded by: District abolished

Member of the Victorian Legislative Assembly for Frankston
- In office 3 April 1982 – 1 March 1985
- Preceded by: Graeme Weideman
- Succeeded by: District abolished

Personal details
- Born: Jane Margaret Henderson; 4 July 1936 Dimboola, Victoria
- Died: 7 September 2015 (aged 79)
- Party: Labor Party
- Spouse: Barrie Hill
- Occupation: Mothercraft nurse

Jane Margaret Hill (13 July 1936 – 7 September 2015) was an Australian politician. She was a Labor Party member of the Victorian Legislative Assembly from 1982 to 1992, representing the electorates of Frankston and Frankston North.

Hill was born in the rural town of Dimboola, where she attended Dimboola State School and Dimboola High School. She moved to Melbourne after completing high school, and worked as a mothercraft nurse until her marriage in 1956. She lived in regional Victoria from 1956 to 1969, when she returned to Melbourne, settling in Frankston. Hill resumed work in 1974, taking up a position as a catering officer at the Frankston Nursing Home. She was elected to the City of Frankston council in 1979, and held both positions simultaneously until her election to parliament in 1982.

Frankston was widely considered to be a safe Liberal seat in 1982, and Hill did not expect to win when she was preselected as the Labor candidate at the 1982 state election. Amidst a strong statewide Labor victory, however, she received a swing of 7.3%, defeating incumbent Liberal MP Graeme Weideman by 76 votes in what was widely considered a major upset. Her seat was divided in two by a redistribution ahead of the 1985 election, where she was re-elected as the member for Frankston North. She was again re-elected in 1988.

Hill faced a much tougher battle for re-election at the 1992 state election, as Labor lost office in a landslide defeat. She ran in the new seat of Frankston East, essentially a reconfigured Frankston North, against new Liberal candidate Peter McLellan, but was narrowly defeated in a result so close it was not known for several days. She died in 2015, aged 79.

Victorian Legislative Assembly
Preceded by Graeme Weideman	Member for Frankston; 1982–1985	District abolished
District created	Member for Frankston North; 1985–1992	District abolished
