= Jim West (boxer) =

Australian boxer

Personal information
- Nickname: Big
- Nationality: Australian
- Born: James West; 13 February 1954 New South Wales, Australia
- Died: 20 December 2015 (aged 61)
- Weight: fly/super fly/bantam/super bantam/feather/super feather/light/light welter/welterweight

Boxing career
- Stance: Orthodox

Boxing record
- Total fights: 81
- Wins: 44 (KO 19)
- Losses: 30 (KO 3)
- Draws: 7

"Big" Jim West (13 February 1954 – 20 December 2015) was an Australian professional fly/super fly/bantam/super bantam/feather/super feather/light/light welter/welterweight boxer of the 1970s and '80s who won the Australian flyweight title, New South Wales (Australia) State bantamweight title, Australian super featherweight title, and Commonwealth flyweight title, and was a challenger for the Australian bantamweight title against Brian Roberts, Australian lightweight title against Matt Ropis, Australian super featherweight title against Paul Ferreri, New South Wales (Australia) State lightweight title against Willie Tarika, and New South Wales (Australia) State light welterweight title against Gary Rosen, his professional fighting weight varied from 110 lb (50 kg; 7 st 12 lb), i.e. flyweight to 143 1/4 lb (65.0 kg; 10 st 3.3 lb), i.e. welterweight, he died in Sydney.
