= Graeme Weideman =

Australian politician (1934–2023)

Member of the Victorian Legislative Assembly
- Constituency: Frankston / Frankston South

Personal details
- Born: 6 November 1934
- Died: 13 April 2023
- Party: Liberal Party
- Relations: Murray Weideman (brother)
- Occupation: Pharmacist, politician

George "Graeme" Weideman (6 November 1934 – 13 April 2023) was an Australian pharmacist and politician in the state of Victoria, who represented Frankston for the Liberal Party from 1976 to 1982 and 1992 to 1996, and Frankston South from 1985 to 1992. He served as Minister for Tourism and Assistant Minister for Health from 1981 until the fall of the Liberal Government in 1982. He was also the older brother of Collingwood footballer Murray Weideman. Graeme Weideman died on 13 April 2023, at the age of 88.

Victorian Legislative Assembly
Preceded by Edward Meagher	Member for Frankston; 1976–1982	Succeeded by Jane Hill
New seat	Member for Frankston South; 1985–1992	Abolished
New seat	Member for Frankston; 1992–1996	Succeeded by Andrea McCall
