= Julius Stone =

Australian legal scholar

Julius Stone AO OBE (7 July 1907 – 3 September 1985) was Challis Professor of Jurisprudence and International Law at the University of Sydney from 1942 to 1972, and thereafter a visiting professor of law at the University of New South Wales and concurrently Distinguished Professor of Jurisprudence and International Law at the Hastings College of Law, University of California.

== Early life ==
Stone was born in Leeds, England to parents who were poor Lithuanian Jewish refugees.

== Education ==
Stone received a scholarship to Exeter College, Oxford, where he earned Bachelor of Arts (Jurisprudence), Bachelor of Civil Law and Doctor of Civil Law degrees. He followed this with a Master of Laws from Leeds University, and then a Doctor of Juridical Science from Harvard University.

== Career ==
Stone taught at Harvard, and briefly at Leeds, then went to New Zealand where he worked at Auckland University College. In 1942, he was appointed Challis Professor of Jurisprudence and International Law at the University of Sydney, a position he held until 1972. Stone's appointment was controversial for several reasons; he was perceived to have a radical jurisprudential stance, some wanted the chair to be held open until the end of the war as it was suggested that there were suitable candidates in active service. It was suspected that the fact that he was a Jew also played a role. A debate over his appointment was carried out in both the Australian parliament and local newspapers; the Chancellor of the university, and two Fellows of the University Senate, resigned in protest. This early experience of anti-Semitism influenced his lifelong commitment to justice, according to his biographer, Leonie Star (Star 1993).

Stone has been described by his official JSIJ biography as having "a life-long commitment to Israel" and in the Sydney Law Review as having an emotional and "fierce loyalty to the State of Israel" that led some of his colleagues to "express fear even to discuss Israel with him".

In 1972, Stone moved to the University of New South Wales, where he was a visiting professor of Law until his death at Rose Bay, Sydney in 1985. While at University of New South Wales, he concurrently held the position of Distinguished Professor of Jurisprudence and International Law at the Hastings College of Law, University of California.

In 1999, 15 years after Stone's death, the University of Sydney established an institute of jurisprudence which was named after him, the Julius Stone Institute of Jurisprudence.

== Influence ==
Stone influenced generations of lawyers who studied at University of Sydney. For most of his time there, the Law School was a practice-based school and students learnt what they needed to become practising lawyers. According to A J Brown of Griffith University, the former Justice of the High Court of Australia Michael Kirby was heavily influenced at university by Stone.

=== Support of Israel ===
Stone's view was that Israeli settlements in the West Bank are legal under international law, and do not constitute a violation of the Fourth Geneva Convention (Article 49(6)).

Stone has been criticised for his views in the Israeli–Palestinian conflict by Ben Saul, saying: "Many of Stone’s positions on critical international legal issues in the Israel/Palestine conflict stepped outside even generous zones of plausible or reasonable interpretations of the law, even on the law as it then often ambiguously stood, and certainly in hindsight."

== Personal life ==
Stone is the father-in-law Margaret Stone, a former judge of the Federal Court of Australia and Inspector-General of Intelligence and Security. He is the grandfather of Australian legal scholar Adrienne Stone.

== Honours ==
- Award of the American Society of International Law (1956).
- Honorary life member of the American Society of International Law (1962).
- Swiney Prize for Jurisprudence from the Royal Society of Arts (1964).
- World Research Award from the Washington Conference on World Peace through Law (1965).
- Officer of the Order of the British Empire, 1973.
- Officer of the Order of Australia, 1981.
- The Julius Stone Institute of Jurisprudence at Sydney Law School, University of Sydney is named in his honour.

== Publications ==
=== Books ===
- International Guarantees of Minority Rights: Procedure of the Council of the League of Nations in Theory and Practice (1932)
- Regional Guarantees of Minority Rights: A Study of Minorities Procedure in Upper Silesia (1933)
- The Atlantic Charter: New Worlds for Old (1943)
- "Stand Up and Be Counted!" An Open Letter to the Right Honourable Sir Isaac Isaacs PC, GCMGM, on the Occasional of the Twenty-Sixth Anniversary of the Jewish National Home (1944)
- Recent Trends in English Precedent, with a Comparative Introduction on the Civil Law (1945)
- The Province and Function of Law: Law as Logic, Justice and Social Control, A Study in Jurisprudence (1947; second edition, 1961)
- Law and Society (1948–49)
- Legal Controls of International Conflict: A Treatise on the Dynamics of Disputes- and War-Law (1954)
- Aggression and World Order: A Critique of United Nations Theories of Aggression (1958)
- Legal Education and Public Responsibility (1959)
- The Eichmann Trial and the Rule of Law (1961)
- Quest for Survival: The Role of Law and Foreign Policy (1961)
- The International Court and World Crisis (1962)
- The Legal System and Lawyers' Reasonings (1964)
- Human Law and Human Justice (1965)
- Soviet Jewry (1965)
- Social Dimensions of Law and Justice (1966)
- Law and the Social Sciences in the Second Half Century (1966)
- Research for Advancement of Peace: A Check-List of Programme Choices (1968)
- Toward a Feasible International Criminal Court (1970)
- Approaches to the Notion of International Justice (1970)
- Self-Determination and the Palestinian Arabs (1970)
- Of Law and Nations: Between Power Politics and Human Hopes (1974)
- Conflict through Consensus: United Nations Approaches to Aggression (1977)
- Israel and Palestine: An Assault on the Law of Nations (1981)
- Visions of World Order: Between State Power and Human Justice (1984)
- Precedent and Law: The Dynamics of Common Law Growth (1985)

== Pamphlets ==
- International Law and The Arab-Israel Conflict (n.d.) [but after 1980], ISBN 0-646-04964-X
