= Neil McInnes =

Neil McInnes may refer to:

- Neil McInnes (1924–2017), Australian intellectual, journalist and public servant
- Neil McInnes (politician) (1924–2005), Australian politician
- Neil McInnes (bowls) (born 1928), former United States international lawn and indoor bowler
