= Vivienne Thom =

Australian public servant

Vivienne Joyce Thom AM (born 1960) is an Australian former public servant and current independent consultant and intelligence specialist. From 2010 to 2015, Thom was the Inspector-General of Intelligence and Security with oversight over the six agencies of the Australian Intelligence Community.

== Biography ==
Thom has a doctorate and academic background in chemistry, and after post-doctoral work and teaching in the field, she joined the Australian Public Service as a patent examiner and qualified as a patent attorney.

== Career ==
In 1999, Thom was appointed as Commissioner of Patents and Registrar of Designs for IP Australia. From 2002 to 2006, she was Controller of the Royal Australian Mint. In March 2006, she joined the Office of the Commonwealth Ombudsman as one of two Deputy Ombudsmen. In 2010, she replaced Ian Carnell as Inspector-General of Intelligence and Security, serving in the role for five years. Since the end of her term as Inspector-General, Thom has worked as an independent consultant in the fields of integrity and governance in public administration. In 2019, Thom commenced an investigation into the conduct of former High Court Justice Dyson Heydon, which found in 2020 that Heydon had repeatedly sexually harassed several judge's associates who worked for him. In 2020, Thom was appointed to review ASIC's governance following revelations that ASIC Chair James Shipton and Deputy Chair Daniel Crennan QC had received ASIC approved expense allowances for relocation. Both were cleared of any wrongdoing in Thom's report to Treasury.

== Accolades ==
In the 2016 Queen's Birthday Honours, Thom was made a Member of the Order of Australia for significant service to public administration through a range of senior roles, and as a mentor to women in executive positions.

== Oral history ==
Thom was interviewed in 2017 by Daniel Connell. The recording can be found at the National Library of Australia.

Government offices
| Preceded by Graeme Moffatt | Controller of the Royal Australian Mint; 2002–2006 | Succeeded by Janine Murphy |
| Preceded by Ian Carnell | Inspector-General of Intelligence and Security; 2010–2015 | Succeeded by Margaret Stone |
