= 2016 Queen's Birthday Honours (Australia) =

The 2016 Queen's Birthday Honours for Australia were announced on 13 June 2016 by the Governor-General, Sir Peter Cosgrove. The Birthday Honours were appointments by some of the 16 Commonwealth realms of Queen Elizabeth II to various orders and honours to reward and highlight good works by citizens of those countries. The Birthday Honours are awarded as part of the Queen's Official Birthday celebrations during the month of June.

== Order of Australia ==
General division ribbon

Military division ribbon

=== Companion (AC) ===
==== General Division ====
Recipient	Citation	Notes
Professor Brian David Anderson AO	For eminent service to information and communications technology, to engineering and to higher education, as an academic, researcher and author, to professional scientific associations, and as a mentor of young scientists.	
Anthony John Beddison AO	For eminent service to the community through leading roles with national and international charitable organisations, as an advocate for corporate social responsibility, philanthropy and business innovation, to children's health, and to business.	
Professor Richard Allan Bryant	For eminent service to medical research in the field of psychotraumatology, as a psychologist and author, to the study of Indigenous mental health, as an advisor to a range of government and international organisations, and to professional societies.	
Professor Michael Ralph Fellows	For eminent service to higher education, particularly in the field of theoretical computer science, as a leading academic, researcher and author, as a mentor, and through public outreach programs particularly for children.	
His Excellency the Honourable Hieu Van Le AO	For eminent service to the people of South Australia, to the development of cultural and economic links with Australia's near neighbours, to the advancement of multicultural inclusion, and as a supporter of the arts and education.	
George Alfred Lloyd AO, OBE	For eminent service to the aviation industry, particularly to the advancement of air safety in Australia, through leading roles with national and international aeronautical organisations, and airsport associations.	
Laureate Professor Alan Donald Lopez	For eminent service to science, both nationally and internationally, as an academic, researcher and author, and to the advancement of planning and policy development to improve public health in developing countries.	
The Honourable Justice Carmel Joy McLure	For eminent service to the law and to the judiciary in Western Australia, to legal administration and professional development, and to the community through contributions to tertiary education and arts organisations.	
Roslyn Redman Packer AO	For eminent service to the community as a leading benefactor and patron, particularly to health care, medical research and social welfare groups, and to the visual and performing arts through philanthropic contributions.	
Her Excellency the Honourable Kerry Gaye Sanderson AO	For eminent service to the people of Western Australia, to the promotion of international investment, scientific research and export opportunities, and through roles with maritime, mining, emergency management and not-for profit organisations.	
Professor David Henry Solomon AM	For eminent service to science as an academic, researcher and author in the field of polymer chemistry and plastics, to the development and commercialisation of processes and materials, and to professional scientific institutions.	
Glenn Robert Stevens	For eminent service to the financial and central bank sectors through leadership roles, to the implementation of innovative monetary and economic policy, to international financial regulation, and to the community.	
Dr Ian James Watt AO	For eminent service to the community through public sector leadership and administration, to innovative and effective governance, program delivery and policy reform, and to the promotion of workplace diversity.	

=== Officer (AO) ===
==== General Division ====
Recipient	Citation	Notes
Audrey June Aarons	For distinguished service to education and international relations, particularly in the Pacific region, and to literacy, numeracy and national language policy development.	
Her Excellency Jan Elizabeth Adams PSM	For distinguished service to international relations through the advancement of Australia's diplomatic and free trade relationships, particularly with the United States of America, South Korea, Japan and China.	
Dr Marian Pam Baird	For distinguished service to higher education, and to women, particularly in the areas of workplace gender equality, parental leave policy and industrial relations, and to social justice.	
Professor Frances Elaine Baum	For distinguished service to higher education as an academic and public health researcher, as an advocate for improved access to community health care, and to professional organisations.	
John Edwin Bertrand AM	For distinguished service to sports administration, particularly to swimming and sailing, to child welfare, to higher education, and as a mentor of young sportspersons.	
Professor James Donovan Best	For distinguished service to medicine, particularly in the area of endocrinology, to medical education as an academic, researcher and administrator, and to rural and Indigenous health.	
Alan Gordon Birchmore	For distinguished service to business in the maritime transport and mining fields, and to the community of Tasmania, particularly in the area of flood mitigation and management.	
Professor Glenn Bowes	For distinguished service to medical education and its administration, to the advancement of child health and welfare, and through contributions to government and professional organisations.	
Dr Michael Leo Briers	For distinguished service to the finance and digital technology sectors, particularly in the area of data intensive research and analysis, to higher education, and to Judo.	
Dr Madeline Dawn Butterworth	For distinguished service to early childhood education, to learning programs for Indigenous youth, as an advocate for the health and well-being of children, and to women.	
Nicholas Bernard Callinan	For distinguished service to the venture capital industry, to the development of innovative technologies in the health care sector, and to medical research, higher education, and the performing arts.	
Dr Richard Ian Charlesworth AM	For distinguished service to sport, particularly field hockey, through coaching and mentoring roles for men's and women's national teams, as a high performance consultant and technical advisor, and to the Parliament of Australia.	
Dr Edwin Sydney Crawcour	For distinguished service to higher education, particularly to Asian and Pacific studies and languages, as an academic and administrator, and to Australia-Japan trade and cultural relations.	
Dr Andrew Cuthbertson	For distinguished service to medical science, particularly through the development and delivery of innovative biotherapies to assist public health, and to professional research organisations.	
Dr Neil William Davey	For distinguished service to public administration, particularly through seminal contributions to the development of Australia's decimal currency, and to international banking, agriculture and bioscience organisations.	
Peter John Duncan	For distinguished service to business through senior roles with a range of petroleum, banking, heavy transport supply, and scientific research organisations, and to the community.	
The Honourable Justice Arthur Robert Emmett	For distinguished service to the judiciary and to the law, to legal scholarship and education in the field of Roman Law, to professional development, and to the community.	
The Honourable Roman Finkelstein QC	For distinguished service to the judiciary and to the law, to legal education as an academic, to jurisprudence in the fields of commercial and competition law, and to professional organisations.	
Dr Vincent William FitzGerald	For distinguished service to business through executive and advisory roles in economic policy development, public administration, and financial management organisations, and to the community.	
Patricia Diana Garcia	For distinguished service to international relations, particularly through humanitarian aid organisations, as an advocate for improved human rights, to education, and as a supporter of refugees.	
Richard James Gill OAM	For distinguished service to the performing arts as a conductor, artistic director and advisor, to the development of music education, and as a mentor of young musicians.	
Emeritus Professor Denise Elizabeth Grocke	For distinguished service to public health as a pioneer practitioner of music therapy programs, to education as an academic, researcher, and author, and to professional associations.	
Dr Thomas Joseph Higgins	For distinguished service to agricultural biotechnology as a biologist and researcher, particularly in the area of plant nutritional value and resistance to pests and disease, and to professional scientific organisations.	
Professor Douglas James Hilton	For distinguished service to medical research and education, particularly in the field of haematology, as a molecular biologist and author, to gender equity, and as a mentor of young scientists.	
Peter John Hurley	For distinguished service to the tourism and hospitality industries through a range of executive and leadership roles, to education and training, and to the promotion of public health initiatives.	
Professor Nalini Joshi	For distinguished service to mathematical science and tertiary education as an academic, author and researcher, to professional societies, and as a role model and mentor of young mathematicians.	
John William Kaldor AM	For distinguished service to contemporary visual art, as a supporter of public art projects, to the development of education programs for children, and through philanthropic contributions to cultural institutions.	
Julian Paul Knights	For distinguished service to the performing and visual arts through a range of executive and philanthropic roles, to the finance industry, particularly to the funds management sector, and to the community.	
Dr Hannah Gerti Krause	For distinguished service to medicine in the field of urology and gynaecology, particularly through surgical assistance to women in developing countries throughout Asia and Africa.	
Professor David George Le Couteur	For distinguished service to medicine as a clinical pharmacologist and geriatrician, particularly through a range of advisory roles and academic research activities.	
Alfred George Moufarrige OAM	For distinguished service to the community through philanthropic contributions and charitable support, and to business and commerce as an industry leader and company director.	
The Honourable Judith Eleanor Moylan	For distinguished service to the Parliament of Australia and the community of Western Australia, particularly through the promotion of the status of women and advocacy for those with diabetes.	
Michael Mrdak	For distinguished service to public administration through executive roles in the infrastructure, transport and logistics sector, and through the development of policy reform initiatives.	
Nyunggai Warren Mundine	For distinguished service to the community as a leader in Indigenous affairs and advocate for enhancing economic and social public policy outcomes for Aboriginal and Torres Straits Islander people.	
Barry John Palmer AM	For distinguished service to the community through global leadership and domestic executive roles with Lions Clubs International.	
Jeffrey Bruce Parncutt	For distinguished service to the community as a philanthropist, particularly in the arts and education sectors, as an advocate and supporter of charitable causes, and to business and commerce.	
The Honourable Dr Kay Christine Patterson	For distinguished service to the Parliament of Australia, and to the community of Victoria, to the advancement of public policy and initiatives, particularly for women, and as a senior academic.	
John Hartley Poynton AM	For distinguished service to the community through leadership in the not for profit and philanthropy sectors, as a supporter of charitable organisations, and to business.	
Gary Francis Quinlan	For distinguished service to public administration in the field of international relations as a senior diplomat and ambassador, and as an advisor to government on foreign policy.	
Dr Anthony John Radford	For distinguished service to science and global public health through innovation, research and development of technology to diagnose tuberculosis.	
Professor Colin Llewellyn Raston	For distinguished service to science through seminal contributions to the field of chemistry as a researcher and academic, and to professional associations.	
The late Professor Michael Robin Raupach	For distinguished service to science in Australia and internationally as a leader and researcher into climate change and land systems, and to professional organisations.	
Rhoda Ann Roberts	For distinguished service to the performing arts through a range of leadership and advocacy roles in the development, promotion and presentation of contemporary Indigenous culture.	
John Robinson	For distinguished service to the community through philanthropic contributions and fundraising for a range of health, sport, social welfare and charitable organisations, and to business.	
Commissioner Andrew Philip Scipione APM	For distinguished service to law enforcement as Commissioner of Police in New South Wales, through advancing the professionalism of policing and leadership of international investigations and counter terrorism activities.	
Gregory Paul Sheridan	For distinguished service to print media as a journalist and political commentator on foreign affairs and national security, and to Australia's bilateral relationships.	
Trevor Charles St Baker	For distinguished service to business and commerce as a leader and executive in the energy sector, and through philanthropic support for a range of heath, arts and Indigenous youth programs.	
The Honourable Alan Robert Stockdale	For distinguished service to the people and Parliament of Victoria as Treasurer, particularly through the implementation of fiscal policy and microeconomic reforms.	
John Francis Strang	For distinguished service to the transport and logistics sector through executive roles in progressing industry development, and to professional business organisations.	
Professor Peter Lawrence Swan AM	For distinguished service to finance and commerce as a leading academic, journalist and commentator on domestic investment, and on a range of political and economic issues.	
Geoffrey Alan Thomas	For distinguished service to business, particularly finance and international trade, through executive roles with a range of organisations, and to the community.	
Marelle Ann Thornton AM	For distinguished service to people with a disability, as a global leader and advocate for support services and increased research funding to prevent cerebral palsy.	
Dr Bernadette Margaret Tobin	For distinguished service to education and philosophy, to the development of bioethics in Australia as an academic, and as a leader of a range of public health advisory and research councils.	
William Stuart Turner	For distinguished service to the mining sector and international relations through leadership in business and exploration collaboration between Australia and Africa.	
John Wegner	For distinguished service to the performing arts as a world renowned operatic bass-baritone, and as an ambassador for the cultural reputation of Australia.	
Professor John William White	For distinguished service to science globally in the field of chemistry, as an academic, mentor and researcher, and through leadership of Synchrotron and neutron science projects in Australia and the Asia-Oceania region.	

==== Military Division ====
Branch	Recipient	Citation	Notes
Army	Major General Simone Louise Wilkie AM	For distinguished service to Defence Education and Training as Director General Training-Army and Commander Australian Defence College.	
Air force	Air Vice Marshal Christopher Lawrence Deeble AM, CSC	For distinguished service to the Australian Defence Force in senior materiel appointments.	

=== Member (AM) ===
==== General Division ====
Recipient	Citation	Notes
Dr Gary John Bacon	For significant service to the forestry industry through a range of roles, to education, to professional associations, and to the community.	
Samantha Hordern Baillieu	For significant service to the community through support for charitable initiatives, to animal welfare, and to rural and regional renewal.	
Emeritus Professor Francis Alfred Bates	For significant service to the law and to tertiary education, to professional legal associations, and to the community.	
Dr (Gordon) Dean Beaumont	For significant service to medicine, particularly in the field of otolaryngology, and to medical research and education.	
John Peter Begley	For significant service to business, particularly to the freight and logistics industries in Victoria, and through support for professional bodies.	
Professor Vicki Bitsika	For significant service to tertiary education in the field of Autism Spectrum Disorders, as an academic, and as a supporter of people with disabilities.	
Suzanne Margaret (Aunty Sue) Blacklock	For significant service to the Indigenous community through advocacy roles for improved child welfare, kinship care and cultural identity.	
Emeritus Professor Sidney Bloch	For significant service to medicine in the field of psychiatry, to medical education as an academic and author, and as a mentor and role model.	
Jason Mathew Booth	For significant service to optometry as a clinical educator, to professional organisations, and to international humanitarian eye care programs.	
Christine Eva Bryden PSM	For significant service to community health through support for people with Alzheimer's Disease and other dementias, and as a leading advocate and author.	
David Theodore Bottomley	For significant service to business, particularly to the social and market research profession, and as a mentor of young researchers.	
Michael Joseph Byrne	For significant service to Catholic education as an administrator, to policy development and reform, and to professional standards.	
Professor Daniel Thomas Cass	For significant service to paediatric medicine as a surgeon, academic and researcher, and to child accident prevention and trauma care.	
Richard Rawnsley Cavill	For significant service to business and commerce in South Australia, as a supporter of industry development and training, and to the aviation sector.	
Kate Ceberano	For significant service to the performing arts, particularly music, as a singer, songwriter and entertainer, and to charitable organisations.	
Associate Professor Kaye Challinger	For significant service to medical administration, to the advancement of nurse education, and to quality health care delivery.	
Thomas Lincoln Chapman	For significant service to the community through leading roles with a range of youth, education, social welfare, aged care and cultural groups.	
Noel (Max) Patrick Christmas	For significant service to the real estate and property development sectors, and to tourism, local government, youth and sporting groups.	
Professor Lynne Cohen	For significant service to tertiary education, particularly in the field of psychology, as an academic, researcher and administrator, and to the community.	
Ronald Eric Cohen	For significant service to business in Western Australia through leadership and executive roles with a range of organisations, and to the community.	
(Robert) Allan Colquhoun	For significant service to the plumbing industry, to professional standards development and training, and as a mentor of apprentices.	
Ann Minette Corlett	For significant service to the community through a range of social welfare, not-for-profit, visual arts, academic alumni, and victim support groups.	
Michael John Coward	For significant service to the print and broadcast media as a journalist, commentator, author and historian, and to cricket.	
Dr Edward Colin Crawford	For significant service to dentistry in the field of orthodontics, to professional organisations, and to tertiary education.	
Malcolm Woodhouse Crompton	For significant service to public administration, particularly to data protection, privacy, and identity management, and to the community.	
Deborah Ruth Dadon	For significant service to the not-for-profit sector through philanthropic foundations, to the arts, to education, and to Australia-Israel cultural relations.	
William Laurence Daniels	For significant service to education as an advocate for the independent schools sector, and to public administration.	
Neale Francis Daniher	For significant service to community health through support for people with Motor Neurone Disease and their families, and to Australian rules football.	
Kenneth George Davis	For significant service to biomedical science and transfusion medicine in South Australia, and to a range of professional blood management groups.	
Graham John Dawson	For significant service to the community through support fora range of charitable organisations, and to the broadcast media industry.	
Dr John Colin Dewdney	For significant service to tertiary education as an academic, researcher and administrator, particularly in the field of public health development.	
Dr Kevin John Donnelly	For significant service to education as a researcher and author, to national curriculum development, and to professional organisations.	
Dr Nicholas William Dorsch	For significant service to medicine as a neurosurgeon, to medical education and training both nationally and internationally, and to research.	
Dr Jack Edelman	For significant service to community health, particularly to people with arthritis and osteoporosis, and to medicine as a rheumatologist.	
The Honourable Cheryl Lynn Edwardes	For significant service to the people and Parliament of Western Australia, to the law and to the environment, and through executive roles with business, education and community organisations.	
Professor Denis James Evans	For significant service to science, particularly chemistry, as an academic and researcher, to tertiary education, and to professional groups.	
Robert Allan Farrar	For significant service to primary industry, particularly to the wool sector, to agricultural research, and to a range of professional organisations.	
Leon Fink	For significant service to the tourism and hospitality industry, as a supporter of the arts, education, and medical research, and to the community.	
Dr Elizabeth Finkel	For significant service to the print media as a science journalist and author, and as a supporter of a range of not-for-profit organisations.	
Ian Ross Fletcher	For significant service to the community of Western Australia through roles with cultural development, business, public administration and mining organisations.	
Professor John Perry Fletcher	For significant service to medicine as a vascular surgeon, to medical education as an academic, and to professional associations.	
Dr Aidan Foy	For significant service to medicine, particularly to gastroenterology, to medical education and administration, and to the community.	
Brian Clifford Goding	For significant service to the not-for-profit sector through support for a range of organisations, and to the community of the Mornington Peninsula.	
Adjunct Professor Barry Goanna Golding	For significant service to tertiary education as a researcher and author, to professional organisations, and to the community.	
Professor Adam Graycar	For significant service to tertiary education as an academic, to public administration through a range of leadership roles, and to professional groups.	
Kathleen Anne Gregory	For significant service to the not-for-profit sector, particularly in the area of community housing, to social welfare organisations, and to young people.	
The Honourable Ian Vitaly Gzell	For significant service to the judiciary, to estate and trust law, to the advancement of professional development, and to the performing arts.	
Dr Robert James Hall	For significant service to sport aviation, particularly to gliding, through leadership, advocacy and training roles, and to the promotion of safety standards.	
Jennifer Anne Hannan-Seggie	For significant service to youth through the development of child protection and family relationship support initiatives, and to the community.	
Kenneth James Harrison	For significant service to the community through financial support and senior roles with horticultural, social welfare, medical and cultural groups.	
Dr Peter Charles Heiner	For significant service to medicine as an ophthalmologist, to medical education and eye health research, and to professional organisations.	
Dr Geoffrey Henry Hirst	For significant service to medicine, particularly in the field of urology, as a clinician, and to medical education and administration.	
Kevin Douglas Hobgood-Brown	For significant service to Australia-China relations, to tertiary education, to international business development, and to the natural resources sector.	
Brother Daniel Edwin Hollamby	For significant service to primary education, particularly in Indigenous communities, through senior teaching and leadership positions.	
Dr Sue Leonie Hooper	For significant service to sport, particularly through applied science and medicine, to tertiary education as an academic and researcher, and to swimming.	
Dr Robert Francis Isaacs	For significant service to the Indigenous community through the advancement of social justice, education, health and housing initiatives, and to reconciliation.	
Judith Helen Jakins	For significant service to the community of New South Wales, particularly through local and state government roles, to aero-medical organisations, and to the education of isolated children.	
Dr Stephen Paul Jefferies	For significant service to primary industry, particularly to grain technology and breeding, through executive, research and education roles.	
Kathleen Miriam Johnston	For significant service to the community through philanthropic support for medical research, aged care, social welfare and charitable groups.	
Andrew Somerville Kay	For significant service to the performing arts through senior advocacy roles in the live performance industry, and as a producer.	
Dr John Timothy Kennedy	For significant service to medicine, particularly in the field of otolaryngology, to medical education and training, and to the community.	
Associate Professor John Owen King	For significant service to medicine as a neurologist, to medical education, to Multiple Sclerosis research, and to professional organisations.	
Walter Tom Kirsop	For significant service to the environment through advocacy roles with a range of conservation foundations, and to the community.	
Associate Professor Elizabeth Jane Koch	For significant service to the performing arts, particularly to music education and performance, and through executive roles with professional associations.	
Associate Professor Vicki Kotsirilos	For significant service to integrative medicine, to health practitioner standards and regulation, to medical education, and to the environment.	
Royce Harry Kronborg	For significant service to medical administration, to national health insurance, to professional hospital associations, to veterans and their families, and to the community.	
Dr William Scott Lawson	For significant service to medicine as a general practitioner, to medical heritage and professional organisations, and to the community.	
Dr Emma Leslie	For significant service to international relations through the facilitation of a network of conflict transformation and peace practitioners in the Asia-Pacific region.	
John Richard Letts	For significant service to the horse racing industry as a leading jockey, through support for a range of charitable groups, and to the community.	
Robert George Logie-Smith	For significant service to the performing arts, particularly opera, through administration and financial support roles, to business, and to the community.	
Paul Thomas Madden	For significant service to the community of South Australia, particularly to social welfare and humanitarian organisations, and to philanthropy.	
Dr William Thomas Mansell	For significant service to the building industry through technological innovation in design and construction, and to professional associations.	
Sally Ann Marsden	For significant service to the arts and cultural development through a range of roles, and to the community of King Island.	
Dr Jennifer Ann May	For significant service to community health in rural and regional areas, as a general practitioner, to professional medical groups, and to education.	
Brother John Lawrence May	For significant service to winemaking, through contributions to professional associations, to regional tourism, and to the Catholic Church in Australia.	
Robert William McCormack	For significant service to the performing arts, particularly through pro-bono legal advisory and support roles, and to the community.	
Timothy James McFarlane	For significant service to the performing arts, particularly through executive roles with not-for-profit and commercial production houses.	
Dr Michael Francis McGuinness	For significant service to dentistry as a clinician, to oral health education, to professional groups, and to the community of Toodyay.	
Professor Robert Ian McLachlan	For significant service to medicine in the field of endocrinology, particularly to men's reproductive health, and to medical research.	
Loris Molent	For significant service to aeronautical engineering, particularly to the structural integrity and airworthiness of Australian Defence Force aircraft.	
Emeritus Professor Peter Rowland Mudge	For significant service to medicine through contributions to professional organisations, to research and tertiary education, and to the community.	
Sharon Mari Mulholland	For significant service to the community of the Northern Territory, particularly to health and social welfare groups, to business, and to public administration.	
Andrew David Murray	For significant service to the community through contributions to aero-medical, conservation, education and research organisations, and to rugby union.	
Dr Iain Douglas Murray	For significant service to people who are blind or have low vision, and to education in the field of assistive technology as an academic and researcher.	
Rodney Harold Nelson	For significant service to business through the advancement of skills development and training, improved productivity outcomes, and network building.	
Alice Josephine Nicholls	For significant service to community health, particularly through support for children with complex neurological conditions and their families.	
Dr John D'arcy O'Donnell	For significant service to community health and education through a range of broadcast media roles, and to medicine as a general practitioner.	
Dennis Reginald O'Hoy	For significant service to the community of Bendigo, particularly through heritage preservation organisations, and to tertiary education.	
Professor Suzanne Yvette O'Reilly	For significant service to the earth sciences as an academic and researcher, to tertiary education, and to scientific associations.	
Dr Donna Marie Odegaard	For significant service to Indigenous cultural heritage through roles with broadcast media organisations, to education and training, and to reconciliation.	
Maithri Hemachandra Panagoda	For significant service to the Sri Lankan community in New South Wales, and to the law, particularly in litigation and dispute resolution.	
Kathryn Ann Pitkin	For significant service to tertiary education and training, particularly for those in rural and regional Australia, and to the community.	
John Henry Planner	For significant service to engineering in the area of bulk solids handling, and to the environment through research into dust emission from coal terminals and rail transport.	
Michael Thomas Pratt	For significant service to public administration through reforms in customer service and communication, and to the finance and banking industry.	
Professor Joseph Proietto	For significant service to medicine in the field of endocrinology, particularly obesity and diabetes research, and as a clinician, educator and mentor.	
Lynn Carol Rainbow-Reid	For significant service to the community through support for a range of cultural and charitable organisations, and to the performing arts as an actor.	
Michael Laurence Ralston	For significant service to medical practice, research and governance, particularly in the field of pathology and laboratory services.	
Anne Miriam Robinson	For significant service to the community through regulatory and governance reform in the not-for-profit and charitable sectors, and to the law.	
Geoffrey Gordon Ryan	For significant service to secondary education, particularly to the independent schools sector, and to professional organisations.	
Maree Carol Ryan	For significant service to music as a classical mezzo-soprano, and to music education through roles as a teacher, mentor and researcher.	
Professor Avni Sali	For significant service to integrative medicine as an educator, clinician and researcher, and to professional education.	
Professor Max Allan Schwarz	For significant service to medicine in the field of oncology as a clinician, mentor and researcher.	
Dr Deborah Fielding Seifert	For significant service to education through a range of teaching, consultative and administrative roles, and to the community.	
Professor Derrick Michael Silove	For significant service to medicine in the field of psychiatry, to medical research as an academic, and to the promotion of mental health and human rights.	
Dr John Stark Skipper	For significant service to medicine in the field of gynaecology as an advocate of women's health and the early detection of cervical cancer.	
Anthony Charles Smibert	For significant service to aikido through a range of roles, and to the visual arts as a painter and water colourist.	
The Honourable George Souris	For significant service to the people and Parliament of New South Wales, and to the community of the Upper Hunter.	
Naseema Sparks	For significant service to business and commerce, and to women through advancing female participation and retention in the workforce.	
Deborah Elizabeth Spillane	For significant service to media as a sports commentator and journalist, and as a role model for women in broadcasting.	
John Victor Stanhope	For significant service to the financial and national communication sectors through a range of leadership roles.	
Alexander Stitt	For service to the graphic arts profession, to the animated film and television industry, and to the community through public health programs.	
Mark Wallace Stone	For significant service to commerce and industry through leadership roles, to the environment and tourism sectors, and to the community.	
Mark David Stoneman	For significant service to conservation and the environment through the management of wetland systems, and to the Parliament of Queensland.	
Dr Vivienne Joyce Thom	For significant service to public administration through a range of senior roles, and as a mentor to women in executive positions.	
John David Thomas	For significant service to the building and construction industry in South Australia and to professional organisations.	
Professor Kim Jocelyn Usher	For significant service to nursing and midwifery education and research, nationally and in the Pacific, and to professional organisations.	
Dr Dorothy Jane Watts	For significant service to tertiary education, particularly the study of ancient history, as an administrator, academic and author.	
Dr Betty Lorraine Weule	For significant service to social welfare, through the development of financial counselling services in New South Wales.	
Christopher Scott Wharton	For significant service to the print and television media in Western Australia as a senior executive, and to the community.	
Kristine Whorlow	For significant service to the community through executive leadership and advocacy for improving health outcomes for those with asthma.	
Ashley John Wilson	For significant service to diving through leadership and development roles, and to the deaf and hearing impaired.	
Peter Alexander Wilson	For significant service to the community through contributions to a range of social welfare, health, sport and charitable organisations.	
Sister Cecilia Mary Wiltshire	For significant service to the community through social welfare programs, to education, and to the Catholic Church in Australia.	
Samuel Winston Smith	For significant service to Australia-France relations, particularly through facilitating trade and investment opportunities in Queensland.	
Rupert Woods	For significant service to veterinary science as a clinician and administrator, and to the management of wildlife health and welfare.	
Clinical Professor Iven Hunter Young	For significant service to respiratory and sleep medicine as a clinician, administrator, researcher and mentor, and to professional societies.	

==== Military Division ====
Branch	Recipient	Citation	Notes
Navy	Commodore Vincenzo Emilio Di Pietro CSC, RAN	For exceptional service as Commander of the Royal Australian Navy Fleet Air Arm from January 2013 to January 2016, and as Australia's Naval Attaché to the United States, from June 2007 to June 2010.	
Navy	Rear Admiral Mark Steven Purcell RAN	For exceptional service as Head of the Rizzo Reform Program and Head of Defence Maritime Systems.	
Army	Colonel Craig David Dobson CSC	For exceptional service as Staff Officer Grade One Military Strategic Commitments, and for contributions to Career Management-Army.	
Army	Brigadier Christopher Antony Field CSC	For exceptional service to the Australian Army as the Chief Operations and Plans, Queensland Reconstruction Authority in 2011, and as the Chief of Staff of Headquarters Forces Command from 2012.	
Army	Colonel Stephen John Gliddon	For exceptional service to the Corps of Royal Australian Engineers as the Commanding Officer 6th Engineer Support Regiment and the Force Engineer.	
Army	Brigadier Matthew William Hall CSC	For exceptional service as the Commander Career Management Agency-Army and the Director General Operational Intelligence, Headquarters Joint Operations Command.	
Army	Brigadier Roger John Noble DSC, CSC	For exceptional service to the Australian Army as Director General Land Development and Commander of the 3rd Brigade.	
Air Force	Air Vice Marshal John Michael McGarry CSC	For exceptional service to the Australian Defence Force in diverse strategic appointments.	
Air Force	Wing Commander Stefano Pesce	For exceptional performance of duty as Executive Officer Aircraft Research and Development Unit, Executive Officer Number 86 Wing, and Commanding Officer of Number 36 Squadron.	
Air Force	Air Vice Marshal Catherine Jane Roberts CSC	For exceptional service in the fields of aerospace acquisition and sustainment.	
Air Force	Air Commodore Philip Theodoor Tammen	For exceptional service in the fields of technical management, acquisition and sustainment.	
Air Force	Air Commodore V	For exceptional service in air combat capability development and military operations.	

=== Medal (OAM) ===
==== General Division ====
Recipient	Citation	Notes
Richard Stephen Adams	For service to veterans and their families, and to the community.	
Colin Alderson	For service to the racehorse training industry.	
Catherine Alexopoulos	For service to the Greek community of Melbourne.	
Annette Alma Allison	For service to the community through a range of organisations.	
Daniel Almagor	For service to the not-for-profit sector, and to social entrepreneurship.	
Beverley Amery	For service to people with a disability, and to the community of Wagga Wagga.	
Russell Stanford Ames	For service to historical organisations, and to the community of Tasmania.	
Patricia McKenzie Anderson	For service to the community of Warrandyte.	
David Ashton-Smith	For service to the performing arts, and to secondary education.	
Trevor Alexander Aust	For service to the community of the Sunraysia.	
Philip Roslyn Baird	For service to the community of Cessnock.	
Stephen William Baker	For service to music education, particularly to voice and performance.	
Dr Peter Balan	For service to tertiary education, and to the community of South Australia.	
Frank William Barr	For service to youth through the Scouting movement.	
Francis Joseph Barrett	For service to the community through social welfare organisations.	
Dr Trevor James Batrouney	For service to the Lebanese community, and to tertiary education.	
Margaret Beardslee	For service to athletics.	
Peter William Beauchamp	For service to veterans and their families.	
Nola Fay Belling	For service to the community of Tarcutta.	
Andrew Somers Bennett	For service to the Australian rendering industry.	
George Henry Bennett	For service to agricultural education, and to rugby union.	
Winifred Maud Bennett	For service to the community, particularly as a hospital volunteer.	
Paul Gregory Betar	For service to charitable organisations, and to the motor trade industry.	
Donald Roy Blackley	For service to the community of Gippsland.	
Genevieve Bolton	For service to the law, particularly to welfare rights.	
Ross James Bower	For service to community museums.	
Phyllis Irene Boyd	For service to heritage preservation.	
Arthur Bozikas	For service to people with a disability through a range of organisations.	
Ann Barbara Brand	For service to the community, particularly through Rotary International.	
Jennifer Lynette Briggs	For service to the community of Benalla.	
Narelle Bromhead	For service to the families of veterans.	
Lieutenant Colonel David Newbold Brook	For service to military history, and to the pleasure boating industry.	
Albert Hugh Brown	For service to the community of Queenscliff.	
Robert Allan Brown	For service to the community through a range of roles.	
Dr David James Brumley	For service to medicine as a general practitioner, and to palliative care.	
Associate Professor David Hamilton Bryant	For service to thoracic medicine, and to medical education.	
Myril Daphne Bunt	For service to the community of the Sapphire Coast.	
Betty Joan Burgess	For service to the community, particularly through the Country Women's Association.	
Terence Anthony Burgi	For service to agriculture, and to the community.	
Robert Frank Burn	For service to marine science, particularly in the field of malacology.	
Patricia Ann Burns	For service to charitable organisations.	
John Michael Burston	For service to the beef cattle industry, and to the community.	
Diana Mary Butler	For service to the international community of Tanzania through humanitarian aid programs.	
Sheila Meredith Byard	For service to women.	
Betty Lesley Cairns	For service to the community of Maryborough.	
Michael David Campbell	For service to the communities of Bairnsdale and East Gippsland.	
Maurice Joseph Carr	For service to the community through social welfare groups.	
Helen Ruth Caterer	For service to the community, particularly through church and social welfare groups.	
Tania Carol Chambers	For service to the arts, and to the film and television industries.	
Michael Stuart Chapman	For service to sailing, and to maritime organisations.	
Jill Hester Chauncy	For service to people with disabilities, and to the community of Moss Vale.	
Choong Man (Vincent) Chow	For service to the Chinese community of Melbourne.	
Bevan Peter Christensen	For service to veterans and their families.	
Major Carl Christie	For service to military history preservation, and to the community.	
Lois Colene Clarke	For service to swimming.	
Paula Mary Clarkstone	For service to the community through music.	
Faith Clayton	For service to the performing arts as an actress and entertainer.	
Emeritus Professor Harold Trevor Clifford	For service to botany, and to tertiary education.	
William Patrick Clinch	For service to cycling.	
Harold Edward Clough	For service to lawn bowls.	
Barbara Ann Cochrane	For service to the community of Benalla.	
Noel Cochrane	For service to the community of Benalla.	
The Reverend Dr John Arthur Cohen	For service to children's literature, and to the community.	
Brooke Leslie Collins	For service to athletics, and to the community.	
Bruce John Collins	For service to youth, and to veterans and their families.	
Kevin James Colman	For service to the community, and to education.	
Rosemary Colyer	For service to the Christian community, and to choral music.	
Kevin Connelly	For service to veterans and their families.	
Catherine Jean Constable	For service to the community of the Southern Highlands.	
Peter Charles Cooley	For service to harness racing.	
Gregory Cornelsen	For service to rugby union, and to charitable organisations.	
Jeanie Cotterell	For service to the community, particularly through music.	
Helen Carlyle Coulson	For service to the community of Echuca - Moama.	
Grant Coultman-Smith	For service to the community, and to veterans.	
Robert Francis Couper	For service to veterans and their families.	
Associate Professor Brett Gerard Courtenay	For service to orthopaedic medicine, and to medical education.	
James Claude Cox	For service to rugby league.	
Dr Bernard Bryan Crimmins	For service to medicine, and to men's health awareness.	
Joseph Robert Crumlin	For service to military history preservation.	
Eric Noel Cullen	For service to swimming, and to the community.	
Barry Lyle Cunningham	For service to the community of Burnie.	
Dorothy Merle Cunningham	For service to the community of Burnie.	
Barbara Teresa Czech	For service to the Polish community of Melbourne.	
Cherry Wulumirr Daniels	For service to the Indigenous community of the Northern Territory.	
The Reverend Graeme Robert Davis	For service to veterans and their families.	
Joan Davy	For service to animal health, and to the community.	
Brian William Day	For service to the community through social welfare advocacy roles.	
Pamela Harcourt De Boer	For service to the community of the Upper Hunter Valley.	
Paul Raymond De Pierres	For service to the community of Wyalkatchem.	
John Willis Dennis	For service to aged care as a volunteer.	
Philip Ambrose Depiazzi	For service to the community through a range of organisations.	
Joseph Robert Diffen	For service to the community through a range of organisations.	
Beverly Janice Dillon	For service to community health through diabetes research organisations.	
Brian Abington Doyle	For service to the law, and to the community.	
The Reverend Neville Preston Drinkwater	For service to the Catholic Church in Australia.	
Donald John Duffus	For service to veterans and their families, and to the community.	
Pamela Anne Dunlop	For service to sheep dog trialling, and to the community.	
Christopher Thomas Dunne	For service to community health through fundraising roles.	
Gail Susanne Dunne	For service to community health through fundraising roles.	
John Atten Dunnicliff	For service to the livestock cattle industry.	
The Honourable Ronald David Dyer	For service to the people and Parliament of New South Wales.	
Beverley Elaine Earnshaw	For service to historical organisations, and as an author.	
Vivienne Joan Edlund	For service to the community of Victoria.	
Azem Elmaz	For service to the community of the Goulburn Valley.	
Kerry David Emery	For service to cricket, and to secondary education.	
Norman Leslie Ensor	For service to veterans and their families.	
Yvonne Denise Evans	For service to the community of Mount Beauty.	
Bruce William Fagan	For service to Judo.	
Janet Mary Farrow	For service to community health through a range of roles.	
Jonathan Robert Ferguson	For service to the Uniting Church in Australia, and to the community.	
June Patricia Field	For service to the community of Yass.	
Noreen Elva Fielding	For service to the community of Concord.	
Kevin Ernest Flanagan	For service to veterans and their families.	
Adrianne Claire Fleming	For service to the aviation industry.	
Edith May Fleming	For service to the community of the Sapphire Coast.	
Kenneth George Foggo	For service to children with a disability in South Australia.	
Dr Andrew Ford	For service to music composition, and as an author and radio broadcaster.	
Dr Carole Anne Ford	For service to women, and to the community.	
Dr Mary Josephine Fortuna	For service to the community, and to tertiary education.	
Robert Henry Fraser	For service to lawn bowls.	
Frank Alfred Galea	For service to youth.	
The Reverend Dr Robert Charles Gallacher	For service to the Uniting Church in Australia, and to religious art education.	
Bernadette Gallagher	For service to the community as a palliative care hospital volunteer.	
Juliette Dorothy Gameau	For service to women, and to the community.	
Iakovos Jack Garivaldis	For service to literature and publishing, and to the Greek community in Australia.	
Michael Pearson Garnett	For service to veterans, to tennis, and to the community.	
Denis Gerard Gastin	For service to the wine industry, particularly as a writer.	
Sybil Agnes Gately	For service to choral music.	
Dr Hannes Gebauer	For service to medicine as a dermatologist, and to hockey.	
Warwick Geisel	For service to local government, and to the community of Dalby.	
Mo'onia Frances Gerrard	For service to netball, and to the community.	
George Wadih Ghossayn	For service to the Lebanese community of New South Wales, and to philanthropy.	
Jessie Ann Gibbes	For service to the community of Roma.	
Jeanette Mary Gibson	For service to community health as a psychologist.	
Dr Stewart David Gill	For service to tertiary education, and to the community.	
Brian Gillett	For service to youth, and to the community of the Illawarra.	
John Adrian Glatz	For service to the horse racing industry in South Australia.	
Danny Goldberg	For service to the visual arts, and to the community.	
Doris Eileen Golder	For service to the visual arts, particularly to wool portraiture.	
Julia Golding	For service to aged persons.	
Ian Woodroffe Goyder	For service to the community through a range of organisations.	
Patricia Ann Grainger	For service to history preservation.	
Daphne May Griffith	For service to the community, particularly as a hospital volunteer.	
Anne Patricia Griffiths	For service to nursing, and to organ transplantation programs.	
John Lawrence Hakes	For service to the community through social welfare organisations.	
Peter John Hamer	For service to the Dutch community of New South Wales, and to Rotary.	
Valerie Irene Hamilton	For service to youth through the Girl Guides, and to the community.	
Allen Christian Hampton	For service to the community of Thurgoona.	
Douglas George Hardgrave	For service to the community through a range of roles.	
William Herbert Hardman	For service to veterans and their families.	
Douglas Martin Harland	For service to community health in the Darling Downs.	
Lindsay Norman Harmer	For service to the community.	
Margaret Eva Harmer	For service to the community.	
Gillian Harrington	For service to the performing arts, and to education.	
Irene Phyllis Harrington	For service to the community through a range of roles.	
Claude James Harris	For service to the community of Albion Park.	
Peter Godfrey Harris	For service to surveying and mapping.	
Ronald Malcolm Harris	For service to the community of Ballarat.	
Brenda Harrold	For service to the community of the Hawkesbury.	
Leigh Frazer Harvey	For service to veterans and their families.	
Neville Hatwell	For service to education, to professional associations, and to the community.	
Linden David Hearn	For service to education, particularly for children with learning difficulties.	
Leslie Simon Heimann	For service to the community through a range of organisations.	
Susan Margaret Henry	For service to the community of Warrnambool.	
Stephen James Heron	For service to children through social and emotional wellbeing programs.	
Edward Francis Higgs	For service to people with a disability.	
Harold James Hird	For service to the community of the Australian Capital Territory.	
Chooi Hon Ho	For service to the Chinese community of Victoria, and to tertiary education.	
Albert Norbert Hoegerl	For service to the international community of Timor Leste through eye health programs.	
Paul Joseph Hogan	For service to local government, and to the community of Greater Taree.	
Frankie J Holden	For service to the arts as an entertainer, and to the community of the Sapphire Coast.	
Brian Thomas Holecek	For service to fire and emergency response organisations, and to youth.	
Helen Margaret Hoppner	For service to charitable organisations, and to the community.	
Laurel Elaine Horton	For service to the community through a range of organisations.	
Bronte Mcgregor Howson	For service to the automotive industry, and to charitable organisations.	
Craig Bradford Howson	For service to the tourism industry in Western Australia.	
Terence John Hubbard	For service to conservation and the environment.	
Leila Winifred Huebner	For service to conservation and the environment.	
Gordon Ronald Hughes	For service to local government, and to the community of Charlestown.	
Douglas John Humphreys	For service to the law through a range of roles, and to professional legal organisations.	
Nicholas David Hunter	For service to rowing.	
Dr Roger Stevenson Hunter	For service to education, and to professional organisations.	
Gordon Wilson Ingate	For service to sailing.	
Peter John Inge	For service to the community, to charitable organisations, and to aged care.	
Meryl Evelyn Jackson-Kew	For service to music education.	
Professor Leo Kenneth Jago	For service to the tourism industry, and to education.	
James Greig Jamieson	For service to the community through a range of roles.	
Margaret Job	For service to charitable organisations.	
Tessa Margaret Jupp	For service to community health.	
Barthalamos Peter Kakulas	For service to the Greek community of Western Australia, and to the legal profession.	
Rabbi Jeffrey Barnet Kamins	For service to the community through religious and educational institutions.	
Robert Stanley Kearney	For service to military history preservation, and to the community.	
John Ambrose Keating	For service to public administration, particularly through legal roles.	
Amanda Rose Keller	For service to the broadcast media, and to the community.	
Mark Andrew Kelly	For service to the international community through humanitarian programs.	
Alan George Killmier	For service to aviation, particularly to gliding, and to the community.	
Douglas Ronald King	For service to medical administration and to community health.	
Jeanette Laureen King	For service to the community of Innisfail.	
Frauline Florence Knippel	For service to veterans and their families.	
Nora Noy Hoey Koh	For service to local government, and to the community of Christmas Island.	
Spyridon Korosidis	For service to the Greek community of Victoria.	
Barbara Erica Kregor	For service to the community of Sorell.	
Shirley Anne Kuhle	For service to the community of Kyabram.	
Victor Neville Kuhle	For service to the community of Kyabram.	
Marianna Lacek	For service to education, and to the Polish community of New South Wales..	
Christopher John Lancaster	For service to the community of the Sunshine Coast.	
Margot Louise Lander	For service to the community of Ku Ring Gai.	
Albert William Lane	For service to the community through a range of roles.	
Ross Trevor Langford	For service to veterans, and to the community.	
Cynthia Joan Langley	For service to table tennis.	
The Reverend Peter John Laurence	For service to education.	
Lancelot John Leak	For service to the community of Port Pirie.	
Peter William Lee	For service to the community of South Gippsland.	
Margaret Lesley Leeson	For service to the community of Burnie.	
Bryan Richard Lenthall	For service to rugby union.	
Judith Anne Lewis	For service to the performing arts, and to the community.	
The Honourable Peter John Lindsay	For service to the Parliament of Australia, and to the community of Townsville.	
Debra Susanne Longhurst	For service to the community through social welfare organisations.	
Allan George Lorraine	For service to the community, particularly to aged care.	
Peter Waipang Louey	For service to the Chinese community in Victoria.	
Robert Ian Love	For service to local government in New South Wales.	
Danny Low	For service to Rotary International.	
Carole Antoinette Lowen	For service to community health through charitable initiatives, particularly for the Royal Children's Hospital.	
Tom Lowenstein	For service to the visual arts, and to the community.	
Peter Bolice Lozan	For service to swimming, and to surf lifesaving.	
Dorothy Eileen Lucardie	For service to adult education.	
Larry Alan Lucas	For service to Scouting in Western Australia.	
Brian Allan Luhr	For service to the Anglican Church of Australia.	
Major Ian Michael Mackenzie	For service to veterans and their families.	
Haydn John Madigan	For service to veterans, and to the community of Port Pirie.	
Norman Gibson Manners	For service to veterans and their families.	
Peter John Martin	For service to education, and to the community.	
Concetta Mazzocato	For service to the community of New Farm.	
Richard Laurence McCarthy	For service to the horse racing industry.	
Gregory Keith McDougall	For service to youth through Scouting.	
Janice Lesley McGowan	For service to the community through social welfare organisations.	
Lieutenant Colonel Peter Edward McGuinness	For service to military history preservation.	
Jenifer Joyce McKenzie	For service to the multicultural and international communities through a range of organisations.	
Jill Pringle McLeod	For service to the community of Braidwood.	
Beryl Lynette McMillan	For service to the community, and to women.	
Daniel Noel McOwan	For service to the visual arts through administrative roles.	
Shirley Dawn McPherson	For service to the community of Moore.	
Darshak Hasmukh Mehta	For service to the community through charitable organisations.	
Douglas William Menzies	For service to youth through Scouting.	
Philip Willoughby Messenger	For service to the community of Benalla.	
Giuseppina (Josephine) Minniti	For service to charitable organisations.	
Theresa Deanne Moltoni	For service to industrial relations.	
Alan Edward Monger	For service to community of Benalla.	
Graham Hugh Morphett	For service to primary industry, and to the community of Western New South Wales.	
John Charles Morse	For service to religious education, and to the community.	
Geoffrey Lyle Morton	For service to local government, and to the community of Central West Queensland.	
John Henderson Murray	For service to Lions International.	
Dr Robyn Stretton Napier	For service to professional medical associations.	
Amanda Carol Nayton	For service to education, and to people with learning disabilities.	
Michael John Nazzari	For service to the community through a range of organisations.	
Kwi Lan Ng	For service to the community of Appin.	
Michael Nghiep Nguyen	For service to the Vietnamese community in South Australia.	
Alison Mary O'Malley	For service to the community of Bundaberg through music.	
Sean Lawrence O'Toole	For service to public administration through city and town planning.	
Berend John Oldenhof	For service to the community of West Tamar.	
Valma Eva Oldfield	For service to the community through a range of organisations.	
Peter John Olds	For service to engineering, and to the community.	
Geoffrey Louis Oliver	For service to the community of Benalla.	
Joanna Pace	For service to the community of East Melbourne.	
Valda Pagram	For service to musical theatre.	
Ross Trevor Parkinson	For service to the community through a range of organisations.	
Bailey Lawrence Pashley	For service to athletics in Queensland.	
Agata (Tina) Patane	For service to the performing arts, and to the community.	
Jean Douglas Paterson	For service to youth through Girl Guides.	
Kingsley John Paul	For service to veterans, and to the community of the Adelaide Hills.	
Marian Pawlik	For service to the Polish community of Victoria.	
Alan Clive Pearce	For service to the community of Mannum.	
Peter William Pearce	For service to the international community through humanitarian programs.	
Dr Rolf Eduard Peters	For service to the chiropractic profession.	
Jeffrey Robert Pinkerton	For service to the community of the Northern Territory.	
Walter James Pisciotta	For service to the automotive industry.	
Cynthia Plunkett	For service to the community through a range of organisations.	
Carol Anne Porter	For service to the community of South East Melbourne.	
Mallika Prasad-Chowta	For service to the multicultural community in South Australia.	
Trevor Walter Prout	For service to local government, and to the community of Tambellup.	
Ernest Douglas Pyle	For service to the community of Maitland.	
Professor Lushan Charles Qin	For service to international relations, particularly through translation and interpretation.	
Patrick John Quinn	For service to Australian rules football, and to the community.	
Carmelo Randazzo	For service to the community of Darwin.	
Doreen Norma Rash	For service to veterans and their families, and to the community.	
Kerry Ann Rayner	For service to youth, and to education.	
Kevin John Regan	For service to the community of Bunbury.	
Edna Emilie Richardson	For service to the families of veterans.	
Patricia June Ritter	For service to German language education.	
Gordon Maitland Roberts	For service to veterans, and to the community.	
Ashley Noel Robinson	For service to the community of the Sunshine Coast.	
Marie Elizabeth Robinson	For service to the community of Bendigo, and to people with a disability.	
Geoffrey David Rodgers	For service to business, and to the community.	
William Ernest Rogers	For service to veterans and their families.	
The Reverend Peter Robert Rose	For service to the community through chaplaincy and Christian support roles.	
Donald Keith Rowlands	For service to conservation and the environment.	
Alasdair Bilton Roy	For service to children and young people through advocacy roles.	
Mark William Rumble	For service to youth, and to the community of Shepparton.	
John Clifford Russell	For service to the community of Campbelltown.	
Susan Leigh Russell	For service to the community of Redland.	
Alan Gavan Ryan	For service to the community of Warragul.	
Associate Professor Nina Sacharias	For service to medicine in the field of radiology.	
Michael Franz Sachsse	For service to the community of South Australia, and to vocational education.	
Raymond Charles Saich	For service to people with Pompe's disease.	
John Mihran Sarkissian	For service to astronomy.	
Mario Giacomo Sartori	For service to the community of Trentham.	
Maria Teresa Savio Hooke	For service to psychoanalysis through roles with professional organisations.	
David Maxwell Scarlett	For service to the law, and to the community.	
Murray Wilfred Schache	For service to the community of Mannum, and to agricultural shows.	
Debra Ruth Schaffer	For service to people who are blind, or with low vision, and to the community.	
Timothy Theodore Schenken	For service to motor sport.	
Stephanie Schwarz	For service to information technology education.	
Robert James Semple	For service to the community through pipe and drum bands, and veterans' organisations.	
Dr David Paul Sevier	For service to medicine as a general practitioner.	
Phillip John Shanahan	For service to education, to tennis and to the community.	
Robert John Silberberg	For service to sailing.	
Audrey Ellen Smith	For service to aged persons through volunteer roles.	
Duncan Tod Smith	For service to Indigenous youth, and to the community.	
Elizabeth Mabel Smith	For service to the community of Tasmania, and to migrants.	
John Arthur Smith	For service to football in South Australia.	
Leslie Smith	For service to youth, and to the community.	
Dr Robert Ward Smith	For service to the community of Tasmania, and to migrants.	
Robert Spence	For service to the broadcast media, particularly as a country music presenter.	
Elaine Helen Spring	For service to the community of the Sapphire Coast.	
Charles Michael Steele	For service to the community through music.	
Ross Gregory Stewart	For service to veterans and their families.	
Carl David Strachan	For service to the community through social welfare organisations.	
Edna May Stride	For service to the community of the Nambucca Valley.	
Margaret Mary Sullivan	For service to women, and to the community.	
Allen Michael Sundholm	For service to conservation and the environment.	
Alan Charles Sutherland	For service to the community of Shepparton.	
Dr Jan Swinnen	For service to medicine, particularly through international humanitarian roles.	
William John Swinson	For service to snow ski safety, and to engineering.	
Jared Tallent	For service to sport as a gold medallist at the 2012 London Olympic Games.	
John Michael Taplin	For service to the community of Cronulla through charitable organisations.	
Andrew Peter Taylor	For service to youth through Scouting.	
Graham Bruce Teede	For service to the building and construction industry.	
Daniel Aron Teller	For service to aged persons, and to the community.	
Patricia Dawne Thomas	For service to people with a disability.	
Richard Thomason	For service to community museums.	
Larry Bryce Thomson	For service to rugby union, and to education.	
John Winston Tramby	For service to local government, and to the community of Moree.	
Dr Richard Lennard Travers	For service to medical history, to medicine, and to the community.	
The Honourable Ivan Barry Trayling	For service to the people and Parliament of Victoria.	
Deirdre Margaret Tuck	For service to medical research organisations, and to oncology nursing.	
Paul William Tyson	For service to veterans and their families.	
Ara Vartoukian	For service to music as a piano technician, and through support for the arts.	
Lionel Percy Veale	For service to the community of the Gold Coast.	
Anthony Michael Villa	For service to the community of the Illawarra.	
Ernie Chester Walker	For service to veterans through the Rats of Tobruk Association of New South Wales.	
Sandra Alyson Wallis	For service to business and commerce in Western Australia.	
Peter Anthony Walsh	For service to the broadcast media, and to the community.	
Marjorie Faye Wastell	For service to hockey, and to the community.	
John Andrew Wauchope	For service to the insurance industry, and to the community.	
Daphne Joan Webster	For service to the communities of Oakey and Toowoomba.	
Dr Gerrit Jan Westerink	For service to medicine, particularly in the field of psychiatry.	
Geoffrey Stephen Wharton	For service to history preservation, and to Indigenous communities .	
Bridget Mary Whelan	For service to community health as an advocate for people with cancer.	
Elizabeth Joanne White	For service to netball.	
Dr Rosalie Judith White	For service to the community of Lithgow.	
Dr David Cameron Wilkinson	For service to hyperbaric medicine.	
Ellen Lorraine Williams	For service to the community through a range of organisations.	
Nadine Florence Williams	For service to the print media in South Australia.	
George Williamson	For service to the community of Toowoomba.	
Robert Charles Wilson	For service to the construction industry in the Northern Territory.	
Gregory Marshall Wragg	For service to the international community of Fiji.	
David Eric Wright	For service to the community of Ballina.	
Robyn Wright	For service to the community of Moruya.	
Professor Prasad Kanaka Yarlagadda	For service to the Indian community in Queensland, and to engineering.	
Patricia June Yates	For service to the community through music.	

==== Military Division ====
Branch	Recipient	Citation	Notes
Navy	Warrant Officer Andrew Michael Bertoncin	For meritorious performance of duty in the field of Communication Information Systems and as the Ship's Warrant Officer in HMAS Sirius.	
Navy	Chief Petty Officer Timothy David Cummins	For meritorious service as the Submarine Escape Equipment Inspector, and Deputy Marine Engineer Officer of HMA Submarines Farncomb and Rankin.	
Navy	Commander Dina Caroline Kinsman RAN	For meritorious service as the Navy People Career Management Agency's Operations Manager and as Chairperson of the Navy Medical Employment Category Review Board.	
Navy	Warrant Officer Jari Juhani Saarenpaa	For meritorious performance of duty in the field of Guided Missile Frigate Fire Control Systems support.	
Army	Major Wayne Joseph Giddings	For meritorious service as the Staff Officer Grade 2 Soldier Combat Ensemble and Engagement, Land Systems Division and as the Staff Officer Grade 2 Separations, Directorate of Soldier Career Management-Army.	
Army	Major Peter Edward Grant	For meritorious service as the Officer Commanding and Music Director of the Australian Army Band-Kapooka and the Australian Army Band-Melbourne, and as the Staff Officer Grade Two Reserve Training at the Defence Force School of Music.	
Army	Warrant Officer Class One Michael Ian Johnson	For meritorious service as the Regimental Sergeant Major of the School of Artillery, the 1st Recruit Training Battalion, 4th Brigade and the Combined Arms Training Centre.	
Army	Warrant Officer Class One Andrew Leonard Platt	For meritorious service as the Regimental Quarter Master Sergeant of the 2nd Commando Regiment, 1st Commando Regiment and the 5th Battalion, the Royal Australian Regiment.	
Army	Warrant Officer Class One Colin Francis Watego	For meritorious service to Indigenous Affairs in the Australian Defence Force.	

== Meritorious Service ==
=== Public Service Medal (PSM) ===
PSM ribbon

Branch	Recipient	Citation	Notes
Federal	Scott Ian Bruckard	For outstanding public service in the area of counter terrorism.	
Federal	Jane Florence Dickenson	For outstanding public service leading to enhanced workforce participation of mothers in Australia.	
Federal	Warwick John Finn	For outstanding public service in advancing Australia's interests.	
Federal	Peter William Harper	For outstanding public service through contributions to Australian and international statistics.	
Federal	Elizabeth Ann Kelly	For outstanding public service to Commonwealth administration in leadership roles.	
Federal	Dr Steven Kevin Kennedy	For outstanding public service in the area of climate change policy.	
Federal	Susan Margaret Kruse	For outstanding public service in the area of access to social, health and other payments and services.	
Federal	Michael Lawson	For outstanding public service to industry reform.	
Federal	Philippa Anne Lynch	For outstanding public service through the delivery of whole-of-government legal policy and governance advice.	
Federal	Patrick John McInerney	For outstanding public service in the protection of the ozone layer and the climate system.	
Federal	Rohan David McNeil	For outstanding public service in the development of intelligence capability.	
Federal	Zdenka Mathys	For outstanding public service through support for Australian Defence Force platforms and operations.	
Federal	Robert Clive Peake	For outstanding public service to aviation safety.	
Federal	Wayne Justin See Kee	For outstanding public service as Chief Executive Officer of the Torres Strait Regional Authority.	
New South Wales	Dr Christopher Alan Armstrong	For outstanding public service to science and engineering, particularly to policy review and development, in New South Wales.	
New South Wales	Robyn Gloria Foster	For outstanding public service to the advancement of workforce planning, industrial relations, organisational design and change management for New South Wales Police.	
New South Wales	Stephen Robert Frost	For outstanding public service to emergency management in New South Wales, particularly to community welfare in times of natural disasters.	
New South Wales	Bronwyn Jones	For outstanding public service to corporate governance processes, organisational reform, and change management initiatives in New South Wales.	
New South Wales	Nicole Carly Kennedy	For outstanding public service through the development and implementation of innovative customer service systems in New South Wales.	
New South Wales	Elizabeth Ann Kinkade	For outstanding public service to the delivery of strategic planning policy and effective corporate governance in New South Wales.	
New South Wales	Gary Charles Lavelle	For outstanding public service to local government in New South Wales.	
New South Wales	Paul Richard Miller	For outstanding public service through the provision of legal advice and freedom of information reform in New South Wales.	
New South Wales	Marnie Anne O'Brien	For outstanding public service to work health and safety in New South Wales.	
New South Wales	John Wilfred Rayner	For outstanding public service to local government in New South Wales.	
New South Wales	Timothy John Spencer	For outstanding public service to the commercial management and economic reform of major infrastructure projects in New South Wales.	
Victoria	Martin Langton Hallett	For outstanding public service through contributions to improving the understanding and protection of cultural heritage in Victoria.	
Victoria	John Insans	For outstanding public service through leadership roles in community correctional service in Victoria, and to the development and delivery of reform initiatives.	
Victoria	Brendan Francis Money	For outstanding public service through overseeing significant changes to correctional practice and leading new approaches to sentence management in Victoria.	
Victoria	Judith Leslie Rose	For outstanding public service through the improvement of educational outcomes for students in the North Eastern region of Victoria, particularly to those from disadvantaged backgrounds.	
Queensland	Paul Raymond Grevell	For outstanding public service to the Queensland public disability sector.	
Queensland	Lucy Elisabeth Karger	For outstanding public service to the environment in Queensland.	
Queensland	Captain Michael Graham Lutze	For outstanding public service to the Queensland maritime sector.	
Queensland	Patricia Birdie Smith	For outstanding public service to child protection services in Queensland.	
Queensland	Philip Charles Venables	For outstanding public service to remote Indigenous communities in Queensland.	
Queensland	Patrick Joseph Vidgen	For outstanding public service to the Queensland Government and to public sector governance.	
Western Australia	John Gilbert Lightowlers	For outstanding public service through the provision of high level strategic legal advice in Western Australia.	
Western Australia	Dr Diane Patricia Mohen	For outstanding public service through the development and provision of maternity health programs and service delivery in regional Western Australia.	
South Australia	Mario Barone	For outstanding public service to local government in South Australia through the provision of leadership and strategic planning.	
South Australia	Stuart Grant Hocking	For outstanding public service to economic, social and environmental policy reform in South Australia.	
South Australia	Dr Anne Helen Ratjjen	For outstanding public service to South Australia particularly through policy development to minimise the supply and impact of illicit drugs.	
Australian Capital Territory	Sandra Georges	For outstanding public service to the law, and to the community of the Australian Capital Territory.	

=== Australian Police Medal (APM) ===
APM ribbon

Branch	Recipient	Notes
Federal	Sergeant Sharan Louise Slater	
Federal	Detective Sergeant Michael Patrick Turner	
NSW Police	Senior Sergeant Kevin Charles Allard	
NSW Police	Superintendent David George Eardley	
NSW Police	Superintendent Stephen Harry Egginton	
NSW Police	Superintendent Paul Joseph Fehon	
NSW Police	Senior Sergeant Donna Maree Murphy	
NSW Police	Detective Superintendent Mark Raymond Noakes	
NSW Police	Detective Inspector Michael Raymond Sheehy	
NSW Police	Detective Superintendent Michael John Willing	
Victorian Police	Superintendent Stuart David Bateson	
Victorian Police	Detective Superintendent Alan John Byrnes	
Victorian Police	Inspector Peter James Ferguson	
Victorian Police	Assistant Commissioner Peter Ross Guenther	
Victorian Police	Assistant Commissioner Stephen Frederick Leane	
Victorian Police	Senior Sergeant Michael Scott Olsen	
Victorian Police	Senior Sergeant Graeme John Stanley	
Victorian Police	Commander Dean Anthony Stevenson	
Victorian Police	Assistant Commissioner Thérèse Mary Walsh	
Queensland Police Service	Senior Sergeant Helen Kay Barnett	
Queensland Police Service	Senior Sergeant Julie Ann Cooling	
Queensland Police Service	Superintendent Peter John Fleming	
Queensland Police Service	Inspector Allan Richard Hales	
Queensland Police Service	Detective Superintendent Michael Pringle Niland	
Queensland Police Service	Senior Sergeant Sonia Frances Smith	
Western Australia Police	Superintendent Peter Ross Halliday	
Western Australia Police	Detective Superintendent Alan James Morton	
Western Australia Police	Sergeant Bernadette Grace Plane	
South Australia Police	Senior Sergeant Kelly Su Clarke	
South Australia Police	Superintendent Mark Francis Fairney	
South Australia Police	Senior Sergeant Thomas Martin Liddy	
Tasmanian Police	Commander Timothy Bruce Dooley	
Northern Territory Police	Senior Sergeant Siiri-Kai Tennosaar	

=== Australian Fire Service Medal (AFSM) ===
AFSM ribbon

Branch	Recipient	Notes
New South Wales	Michael William Brettschneider	
New South Wales	Joseph Gerrard Brown	
New South Wales	Alec Ralph Byers	
New South Wales	Barry Joseph Cleary	
New South Wales	Timothy Paul Fox	
New South Wales	Christopher John Kane	
New South Wales	Patrick James Linnane	
New South Wales	Christopher Gilbert Nesbitt	
New South Wales	Alexander Keith Scott	
New South Wales	Alfred William Snowden	
Victoria	Bernard Paul Barbetti	
Victoria	Maxwell George Cox OAM	
Victoria	Paul Martin Emsden	
Victoria	Gregory James Kennedy	
Victoria	Gregory Alan Patterson	
Victoria	John William Pearce	
Queensland	Stephen Alan De Prada	
Queensland	Geoffrey Gordon Henders	
Queensland	Patrick Hollands	
Queensland	Jonathan Simon Karas	
Queensland	Richard Eric Lohse	
Queensland	Shane Thomas Tinsley	
Queensland	Leonardo Tosacno	
Western Australia	Adam John Bannister	
Western Australia	Robert Kingma	
Western Australia	Trevor David Tasker	
South Australia	Richard George Munn	
South Australia	Ian Craig Tanner	
Australian Capital Territory	David Trevor Ingram	
Australian Capital Territory	John Streatfield	
Northern Territory	Gerald Joseph Laverty	

=== Ambulance Service Medal (ASM) ===
ASM ribbon

Branch	Recipient	Notes
Queensland Ambulance Services	Marcia Dawn Love	
Queensland Ambulance Services	Todd Andrew Wehr	
Queensland Ambulance Services	Paul Scott Young	
South Australian Ambulance Services	Steven John Cameron	
South Australian Ambulance Services	Leon Keith Cutting	

=== Emergency Services Medal (ESM) ===
ESM ribbon

Branch	Recipient	Notes
New South Wales Emergency Services	Dennis Keith Buck	
New South Wales Emergency Services	Anthony Charles Drover	
New South Wales Emergency Services	John David Lynch	
New South Wales Emergency Services	Leslie John Threlfo	
Victorian Emergency Services	Mark Raymond Scott	
Victorian Emergency Services	Ross Gordon Wilkinson	
Queensland Emergency Services	Maxwell Robert Hunter	
Western Australian Emergency Services	Brian Robert Lucy	
Western Australian Emergency Services	James Gregor MacLean	
South Australian Emergency Services	Anthony James Sumner	
Australian Capital Territory Emergency Services	Paul Denis Cortese	

== Distinguished and Conspicuous Service ==
=== Distinguished Service Cross (DSC) ===
DSC ribbon

Branch	Recipient	Citation	Notes
Army	Major General David Thomas Mulhall AM, CSC	For distinguished command and leadership in warlike operations as Commander Joint Task Force 636 and Deputy Chief of Staff Support Headquarters International Security Assistance Force and Headquarters Resolute Support on Operations SLIPPER and HIGHROAD from May 2014 until May 2015.	

=== Distinguished Service Medal (DSM) ===
DSM ribbon

Branch	Recipient	Citation	Notes
Army	Major K	For distinguished leadership in warlike operations as the Officer Commanding, the Commando Company Group with the Special Operations Task Group on Operation OKRA in Iraq from February to September 2015.	
Air Force	Group Captain Glen Edward Braz CSC	For distinguished leadership in warlike operations as Commander Air Task Group 630 on Operation OKRA from 5 January 2015 until 5 July 2015.	

=== Commendation for Distinguished Service ===
Commendation for Distinguished Service ribbon

Branch	Recipient	Citation	Notes
Army	Corporal L	For distinguished performance of duty in warlike operations as a Joint Terminal Attack Controller with Special Operations Task Group 632.	
Air Force	Corporal G	For distinguished performance of duties in warlike operations at the Combined Joint Intelligence Operations Centre - Afghanistan.	
Air Force	Wing Commander G	For distinguished performance of duties in warlike operations as Commander Task Unit 630.2 from January to June 2015 on Operation OKRA.	
Air Force	Squadron Leader Scott Harris	For distinguished performance of duties in warlike operations over six rotations to the Middle East Region on Operation SLIPPER during the period 2005 to 2012.	

=== Bar to the Conspicuous Service Cross (CSC & Bar) ===
Branch	Recipient	Citation	Notes
Army	Colonel Timothy Sean Connolly CSC	For outstanding achievement as Commanding Officer of the 6th Aviation Regiment for the period 2014 to 2015.	
Army	Colonel Glenn James Ryan CSC	For outstanding achievement as the Commanding Officer of the 1st Recruit Training Battalion.	
Army	Colonel Charles Peter Weller CSC	For outstanding achievement as the Commander, Australian Contingent and Senior Military Liaison Officer-Jonglei State, Operation ASLAN, United Nations Mission in South Sudan from November 2014 to July 2015.	
Army	Brigadier Georgeina Mary Whelan AM, CSC	For outstanding achievement as the Director General Garrison Health Operations.	

=== Conspicuous Service Cross ===
Conspicuous Service Cross ribbon

Branch	Recipient	Citation	Notes
Navy	Captain David Stewart Hope RAN	For outstanding achievement as the Commanding Officer of the Defence Force School of Languages.	
Navy	Captain Justin Garred Jones RAN	For outstanding devotion to duty as the Commanding Officer, HMAS Success while deployed on Operation MANITOU from December 2014 to April 2015.	
Navy	Captain David Peter Mann RAN	For outstanding devotion to duty as Director Navy Capability Needs and Analysis, Navy Strategic Command, in support of force design and development.	
Navy	Commander Leif Erik Maxfield RAN	For outstanding devotion to duty as the Commanding Officer HMAS Tobruk from June 2013 to August 2015.	
Navy	Captain Heath Jay Robertson RAN	For outstanding achievement as Captain Sea Training from August 2011 to September 2014.	
Army	Lieutenant Colonel Troy Jason Francis	For outstanding achievement as the Commanding Officer and Chief Instructor of the Warrant Officer and Non Commissioned Officer Academy.	
Army	Lieutenant Colonel Bede Thomas Galvin	For outstanding achievement as the Commanding Officer of the 20th Surveillance and Target Acquisition Regiment.	
Army	Lieutenant Colonel Craig George Jolly	For outstanding achievement in the Counter Improvised Explosive Device Task Force.	
Army	Captain R	For outstanding achievement as the senior communications officer on Operation AUGURY.	
Army	Warrant Officer Class One Paul Marcus Richardson OAM	For outstanding achievement as the Regimental Sergeant Major in the Office of the Vice Chief of the Defence Force in the area of Ceremonial and Protocol.	
Army	Lieutenant Colonel Tamara Joy Rouwhorst	For outstanding achievement as the Staff Officer Grade One Cultural Reform in Army Headquarters.	
Army	Lieutenant Colonel Corey Jason Shillabeer	For outstanding achievement as the Staff Officer Grade One Strategic Force Generation within Strategic Plans Branch, Army Headquarters.	
Army	Colonel John Andrew Simeoni	For outstanding devotion to duty as the Commanding Officer, Combat Training Centre-Live for the period 2006 to 2009 and Commander, Combat Training Centre during the period 2014 to 2015.	
Army	Colonel Jeffery Macdonald Squire	For outstanding achievement as Director Information Activities in Military Strategic Commitments Division.	
Army	Lieutenant Colonel Katherine-Anne Stweart	For outstanding devotion to duty as Australia's Defence Attaché to Baghdad, in support of Operation OKRA.	
Air Force	Flight Lieutenant Clinton Joel Baldock	For outstanding devotion to duty as the C-130J Simulator Fidelity Manager at Number 285 Squadron.	
Air Force	Air Commodore Alan Gregory Clements	For outstanding achievement as Commandant of the Australian Defence Force Academy.	
Air Force	Warrant Officer Mathew Anthony Green	For outstanding achievement as the C-27J Spartan aircraft Transition Team Operations Loadmaster.	
Air Force	Wing Commander Nicholas James Grey	For outstanding achievement as the Director of Project AIR5431 Defence Air Traffic Management and Control Systems.	
Air Force	Wing Commander Richard John Hutchinson	For outstanding achievement as the Commanding Officer of Number 462 Squadron.	
Air Force	Squadron Leader Jonathan Henry Jorgensen	For outstanding achievement as the Senior Engineering Officer of Number 36 Squadron, Royal Australian Air Force.	
Air Force	Group Captain Harry Mark Larter	For outstanding achievement as the Senior Australian Defence Force Officer at Royal Australian Air Force Base Tindal and Commanding Officer Number 17 Squadron.	
Air Force	Group Captain Richard Paul Pizzuto	For outstanding devotion to duty as Officer Commanding 41 Wing, Royal Australian Air Force.	
Air Force	Squadron Leader Sarah Louise Stalker	For outstanding achievement as the Commander, Air Component Coordination Element on Operation ACCORDION in support of Australian Defence Force operations in the Middle East Region from January to July 2015.	
Air Force	Group Captain Susan Stothart	For outstanding devotion to duty as the Director of Senior Officer Management-Air Force.	
Air Force	Wing Commander Michael Gordon Tully	For outstanding achievement as Deputy Director Special Purpose Aircraft, Air Force Headquarters.	
Air Force	Flight Sergeant Luke Joseph Walker	For outstanding achievement in Deployable Information Systems and Communications.	

=== Conspicuous Service Medal (CSM) ===
CSM ribbon

Branch	Recipient	Citation	Notes
Navy	Warrant Officer Christopher John Apperly	For meritorious devotion to duty as the Assistant Fleet Whole Ship Coordinator in Sea Training Group-Major Fleet Units from January 2013.	
Navy	Petty Officer Stacey Fay Brotherton	For meritorious achievement as the Research and Communication Coordinator for the Royal Australian Navy Divisional System.	
Navy	Warrant Officer Darcy Glenn Cook	For meritorious achievement as the senior Fire Control Warrant Officer within Fleet Command.	
Navy	Chief Petty Officer Darren John Harkins	For meritorious devotion to duty as the Hull Maintenance Manager and Damage Control Chief Petty Officer in HMAS Canberra.	
Navy	Chief Petty Officer Mark Daniel Verhoeven	For meritorious achievement as the Senior Marine Technical Officer in Patrol Boat Crew Attack Four during border protection operations.	
Navy	Lieutenant Commander Jared Peter Webb RAN	For meritorious devotion to duty as the Navigation Officer, Principal Warfare Officer and Operations Officer onboard HMAS Success on Operation MANITOU, from December 2014 to May 2015.	
Navy	Lieutenant Commander Dylan White RAN	For meritorious devotion to duty as the Above Water Warfare Officer and Operations Officer in HMAS Perth from February 2013 to July 2015.	
Navy	Leading Seaman Susan Elizabeth Wright	For meritorious devotion to duty as an Above Water Warfare Instructor, within Training Authority Maritime Warfare at HMAS Watson.	
Army	Major Jonathan Philip Abundo	For meritorious devotion to duty as the Officer Commanding Proof and Experimental Establishment-Port Wakefield.	
Army	Major Joanne Therese Baker	For meritorious devotion to duty as a Specialist Recruiting Team - Health member in Defence Force Recruiting from 2014 to 2015.	
Army	Lieutenant Colonel Andrew Brian Behan	For meritorious achievement as the Chief of Staff of the Royal Military College of Australia.	
Army	Warrant Officer Class Two Michael James Carroll	For meritorious achievement as the Company Sergeant Major of the Ready Combat Team and Operations Warrant Officer of the Ready Battalion Group, 1st Battalion, the Royal Australian Regiment.	
Army	Major Aaron Peter Cimbaljevic	For meritorious achievement as a United Nations Military Observer in United Nations Truce Supervision Organisation on Operation PALADIN, from December 2013 to March 2015.	
Army	Major Luke Philip Conon	For meritorious achievement as the Officer Commanding Force Support Element - One on Operation ACCORDION in support of Australian Defence Force operations in the Middle East Region from July 2014 to February 2015.	
Army	Warrant Officer Class Two Shane Doevendans	For meritorious achievement as the Regimental Training Warrant Officer of the North West Mobile Force.	
Army	Major Craig J Fallshaw	For meritorious achievement as Staff Officer Information Management within the Directorate of Projects and Standby Reserve Management-Army.	
Army	Corporal Rhys L Griggs	For meritorious achievement as the Electronic Technician Systems Corporal, Joint Logistic Unit (Victoria) Short Range Air Defence and Radar Workshop.	
Army	Corporal J	For meritorious achievement as the Senior Instructor of the Military Working Dog Cell, Special Air Service Regiment from 2012 to 2015.	
Army	Corporal Broderick Jay Naunton	For meritorious achievement as the Acting Platoon Commander, Mechanised Platoon, Support Squadron, the School of Armour.	
Army	Major Fiona Antoinette Peden	For meritorious devotion to duty as a Senior Career Advisor within the Directorate of Soldier Career Management-Army.	
Army	Warrant Officer Class Two Timothy Trent Pimlott	For meritorious achievement as the Operations Warrant Officer at Headquarters 9th Brigade.	
Army	Colonel Andrew Alfred Plant	For meritorious achievement as the Director of Operations and Chief of Staff of Headquarters Joint Task Force 633, Middle East Region, from October 2014 to July 2015.	
Army	Major Kelvin Stuart Seabrook	For meritorious achievement as the Staff Officer Grade Two, Joint Fires, Headquarters 2nd Division.	
Army	Major Maryanne Thomson	For meritorious achievement as the Officer in Charge of the Soldier Recovery Centre-Brisbane.	
Air Force	Wing Commander M	For meritorious achievement as Chief of Staff of the Air Task Group and Commander Task Element 630.1.0 on Operation OKRA, from January to August 2015.	

=== Meritorious Unit Citation ===
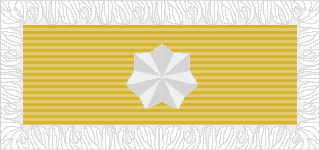
Insignia as worn by members of unit when awarded.

Branch	Recipient	Citation	Notes
Air Force	Number 5 Flight	For sustained outstanding service in warlike operations through the provision of Intelligence, Surveillance and Recovery capability on Operation SLIPPER, over the period January 2010 to November 2014.	
Air Force	Number 36 Squadron and Number 37 Squadron	For sustained outstanding service in warlike operations throughout the Middle East Area of Operations over the period January 2002 to June 2014.	
