= Ian Carnell =

Australian public servant (born 1955)

Ian Carnell AM

5th Inspector-General of Intelligence and Security
- In office 23 March 2004 – 9 April 2010
- Prime Minister: John Howard; Kevin Rudd
- Preceded by: Bill Blick
- Succeeded by: Vivienne Thom

Personal details
- Born: Ian Gregory Carnell; 24 October 1955 (age 70) Melbourne, Victoria, Australia
- Spouse: Kate Carnell (m. 1977–1997)
- Education: Brisbane Grammar School
- Alma mater: University of Queensland; Australian National University
- Occupation: Public servant

Ian Gregory Carnell AM (born 24 October 1955) is an Australian public servant, who was Inspector-General of Intelligence and Security, responsible for oversight of Australia's intelligence agencies, from 2004 to 2010.

Carnell was born in Melbourne, and moved to Queensland with his family where he attended Brisbane Grammar School and graduated with a Bachelor of Arts from the University of Queensland. In 1977, he married Kate Carnell (née Frazer), who would later become Chief Minister of the Australian Capital Territory.

In the mid-1980s, Carnell worked for the Department of Social Security (later Centrelink) as assistant secretary, then moved to the Department of Veterans' Affairs in 1997. In 2000, he became Deputy Secretary of the Attorney-General's Department and in 2004, was appointed as Australia's fifth Inspector-General of Intelligence and Security.

Government offices
Preceded by Bill Blick	Inspector-General of Intelligence and Security; 2004–2010	Succeeded by Vivienne Thom
