= Margaret Stone (judge) =

Australian judge (died 2021)

The Honourable Margaret Stone AO FAAL

Judge of the Federal Court of Australia
- In office 9 October 2000 – 22 March 2012

Additional Judge of the Supreme Court of the Australian Capital Territory
- In office November 2003 – 22 March 2012

Inspector-General of Intelligence and Security
- In office 24 August 2015 – 23 August 2020
- Preceded by: Vivienne Thom
- Succeeded by: Christopher Jessup

Personal details
- Born: Unknown
- Died: 1 September 2021
- Education: University of Sydney; Australian National University; Yale Law School
- Occupation: Judge

Margaret Ackary Stone AO FAAL (died 1 September 2021) was an Australian judge who served on the Federal Court of Australia. Stone served as the Inspector-General of Intelligence and Security from August 2015 until her retirement in August 2020.

== Education ==
Stone obtained a Bachelor of Arts from the University of Sydney, a Bachelor of Laws with honours from the Australian National University, and a Master of Laws from Yale Law School.

== Career ==
Stone taught law at the University of New South Wales for over 15 years, including a role as Sub-Dean in 1981. She also worked as a solicitor becoming a partner at Freehills in 1993, where she worked in the areas of commercial property, infrastructure development, commercial financing, and taxation.

=== Federal Court ===
Stone was appointed a judge of the Federal Court of Australia in October 2000. Whilst a federal court judge, she was also appointed an Additional Judge of the Supreme Court of the Australian Capital Territory. Stone retired from both judicial positions in March 2012.

=== Subsequent career ===
Since retiring from the Federal Court Stone was a Judge in Residence at the Melbourne Law School in 2012. In 2013 she was appointed a Visiting Professorial Fellow at the University of NSW.

Between December 2012 and December 2014 she served as Australia's Independent Reviewer of Adverse Security Assessments. Adverse security assessments are findings by the Australian Security and intelligence Organisation that a person who has been found to be a refugee is a security risk. Such people are kept in detention until such time as it is determined that they are no longer security risks. They do not have access to the evidence on which the assessments are made; but in some cases may have some indications of the nature of the accusations. Stone had reviewed 22 of 52 adverse assessments as of June 2014, as a result of which four people have had their adverse assessments removed. By June 2015 Stone finalised a further 24 reviews, finding that five adverse assessments were either flawed or not appropriate.

Stone was appointed the Inspector-General of Intelligence and Security from 24 August 2015 until her retirement in August 2020.

== Death and legacy ==
Stone died on 1 September 2021 and was survived by her husband, three daughters and their families.

The Margaret Stone Lecture was inaugurated in her honour in 2023, a joint initiative of the University of New South Wales and Herbert Smith Freehills. Lectures have been given by The Honourable Justice Michelle Gordon (2023) and The Honourable Justice Nye Perram (2025).

Legal offices
Preceded by James Burchett	Judge of the Federal Court of Australia; 2000–2012	Succeeded by John Griffiths
Government offices
Preceded by Vivienne Thom	Inspector-General of Intelligence and Security; 2015–2020	Succeeded by Christopher Jessup
