= Bernadette Tobin =

Australian Catholic ethicist (born 1946)

Bernadette Tobin AO
- Born: 1946 (age 79–80)
- Occupation: Ethicist

Bernadette Tobin AO (born 1946) is an Australian Catholic ethicist and professor of philosophy. She is the daughter of political activist and journalist B.A. Santamaria.

== Education ==
Tobin was educated at Genazzano College, Kew and received her undergraduate degree from the University of Melbourne in 1968. She also completed a Masters of Education (1977) and a Master of Arts (1983) at the same institution.

Tobin completed her doctoral degree at Cambridge University in politics.

== Career ==
Tobin began her career as a teacher. She taught philosophy at Mercy Teachers' College, Melbourne and English at Tottenham Technical School.

Tobin is a founding director of The Plunkett Centre. The centre was established in 1992 as a joint venture between St Vincent's Hospital and the Australian Catholic University. Tobin was appointed a Senior Lecturer in Philosophy at the Australian Catholic University in 1996. She held this position until 2002.

Tobin is an honorary member of the medical faculty at the University of New South Wales and the University of Sydney through the clinical schools at St Vincent's and the Children's Hospital, Westmead respectively. She has been a featured speaker at the Wheeler Centre speaking about faith, religion and spirituality.

Tobin has served on the Australian Health Ethics Committee and the Garvan Institute of Medical Research ethics committee. As chair of the St John's College, University of Sydney council between 2013 and 2020, she oversaw protracted negotiations that led to the new St John's College Act 2018. In 2017, Tobin was appointed as a life member of the Pontifical Academy.

Up to 2026 she was president of the International Association of Catholic Bioethics.

== Personal life ==
Tobin is married to Terence Tobin, who is a former Chancellor of the University of Notre Dame Australia. As close friends of George Pell, the Tobins visited him frequently in prison and assisted with his communication with lawyers.

== Awards ==
In the 2016 Queen's Birthday Honours, Tobin was made an Officer of the Order of Australia for her work in bioethics, and public advisory and research councils.

In 2018, Tobin was made a Dame Grand Cross of the Order of St. Gregory the Great, alongside her husband Terence Tobin. The papal award was for her service in ethics and education.

== Publications ==
- Tobin, Dr Bernadette (6 March 2020). "Dr Bernadette Tobin: IVF case answers deep questions". The Catholic Weekly.
- Tobin, Dr Bernadette (25 March 2020). "Ethics for Australian healthcare in the midst of a pandemic". The Catholic Weekly.
- Tobin, Dr Bernadette (13 November 2019). "Fragmenting motherhood: 3-parent children, IVF and the future". The Catholic Weekly.
- Guest editor (with Steve Matthews) of Theoretical Medicine and Bioethics (2016)
- Is it justifiable to compel performance by a doctor in violation of conscience? Australasian Catholic Record, January 2019
- Female Genital Mutilation and the role of health-care practitioners (with David Isaacs), Journal of Paediatrics and Child Health, 53, 2017
- Human vulnerability in medical contexts (with Steve Matthews). Theoretical Medicine and Bioethics, 37, 2016.
- When doctors and parents disagree. Journal of Paediatrics and Child Health, 50, 2014.
- Religious Perspectives on Umbilical Cord Blood Banking (with Jordens, C et al.) Journal of Law and Medicine, 19; 2012.
- Spinal muscular atrophy: do the benefits of ventilation compensate for its burdens? (with Gray, K; Isaacs, D; Kilham, H;) Journal of Paediatrics and Child Health, 49, 2013.
- Tobin, Bernadette (2005). "Australian consequentialism: An Australian critique". Theoretical Medicine and Bioethics. 26 (3): 165–173. doi:10.1007/s11017-005-3974-z. PMID 16048067. S2CID 34263316.
- Tobin, Bernadette M. (1989). "Richard Peters' theory of moral development". Journal of Philosophy of Education. 23 (1): 15–27. doi:10.1111/j.1467-9752.1989.tb00621.x.
- Tobin, Bernadette M. (1989). "An Aristotelian theory of moral development". Journal of Philosophy of Education. 23 (2): 195–211. doi:10.1111/j.1467-9752.1989.tb00207.x.
- Tobin, Bernadette M. (1986). "Development in virtues". Journal of Philosophy of Education. 20 (2): 201–214. doi:10.1111/j.1467-9752.1986.tb00127.x.
