= Geoffrey Thomas (businessman) =

Australian businessman (born 1959)

- Born: 11 March 1959 (age 67); Queensland, Australia
- Occupation: Businessman

Geoffrey Alan Thomas AO is an Australian-born international businessman with interests in Australia, the United States, Indonesia, and Thailand. He has held a number of government, political, and non-profit sector positions throughout his professional career. He is an advisor and industry expert to the Government of Queensland regarding trade and economic policy towards the United States and as the deputy chairman of Trade and Investment Queensland.

== Business interests and ventures ==
=== Current business activities ===
Thomas has numerous business interests that span multiple continents. Within Australia, Thomas is the sole owner of Maleny Manor, a noted ceremony and reception venue in Queensland; Rancho del Cielo, a special events venue; Settlers Rise Vineyard and Winery, an internationally distributed and award-winning Australian wine operated by Peter Scudamore-Smith, Australia's second Master of Wine and recipient of thirty-seven wine awards; and Carbrook Nursery, a business that specialises in growing drought tolerant plants for the commercial industry.

=== Past business activities ===
His past business ventures have included numerous owner and executive chairman positions in the finance industry, including Capitalcorp Financial Services, Australian Capital Home Loans, Capitalcorp Finance and Leasing, and Austcorp Finance and Leasing.

== Public sector, non-profit, and volunteer work ==
Thomas has held a number of government, non-profit, and political positions throughout his professional career.

=== Queensland trade and investment policy review ===
On 1 November 2012, Tim Nicholls, the Minister for Trade for Queensland, Australia announced that Thomas would undertake a comprehensive review of Trade and Investment Queensland (TIQ), an office of the Queensland Department of Employment, Economic Development and Innovation. Premier Campbell Newman identified the TIQ review as among the Queensland Government's "top priorities" within a series of ministerial "to-do" lists released on 23 November 2012. Thomas conducted the review jointly with former Queensland Minister for Trade John Mickel. The review was due to the Government by the end of 2012. Thomas forwent a salary or financial compensation for this appointment.

The recommendations of the review were adopted by Government, and on 22 October 2013, Nichols announced Cabinet approval for the appointment of six members of the newly created TIQ board, including Thomas as its deputy chairman.

=== North American trade emissary ===
In 2001, Thomas was appointed Special Commissioner to North America by Queensland Premier Peter Beattie. In this capacity, he operated as an emissary on behalf of the Premier, representing Queensland's interests abroad. He has continued to stay involved in international trade and economic policy.

Thomas has since coordinated a collaborative industry venture with the Queensland State Government and has served as an independent panel member to the Commonwealth Government.

=== Trade and diplomatic relations with Texas ===
At the international level, Thomas received a number of honorary designations in recognition for his business involvement and diplomatic efforts. He served as chairman of the Texas-Queensland Sister State Friendship Committee in 1997. He served as an honorary trade representative for Queensland, Australia at multiple points between 1997 and 2006. Thomas received recognition by the Texas government for his diplomatic efforts. In 1995 and 2000, he was designated an honorary Texan by then Texas Governor George W. Bush. On 20 November 2004, he was designated honorary Texas Secretary of State for the Day by Texas Senate president pro tem Jeff Wentworth. In 2007, he was appointed by the Texas Secretary of State as Texas' Honorary Trade Representative to Australia.

=== Non-profit organisation board positions ===
Thomas serves as a member of the board of directors for the following non-profit or charitable organisations: The Board of the Friends of Griffith University (incorporated in the USA); The Board of Advice of the Institute for Glycomics, Griffith University; and Trustee for General Douglas MacArthur Brisbane Memorial Foundation, MacArthur Museum. He is a major benefactor of the MacArthur Museum.

== Awards ==
Thomas was created an Officer of the Order of Australia in the 2016 Queen's Birthday Honours.
