= Neil McInnes (1924–2017) =

Australian intellectual and journalist

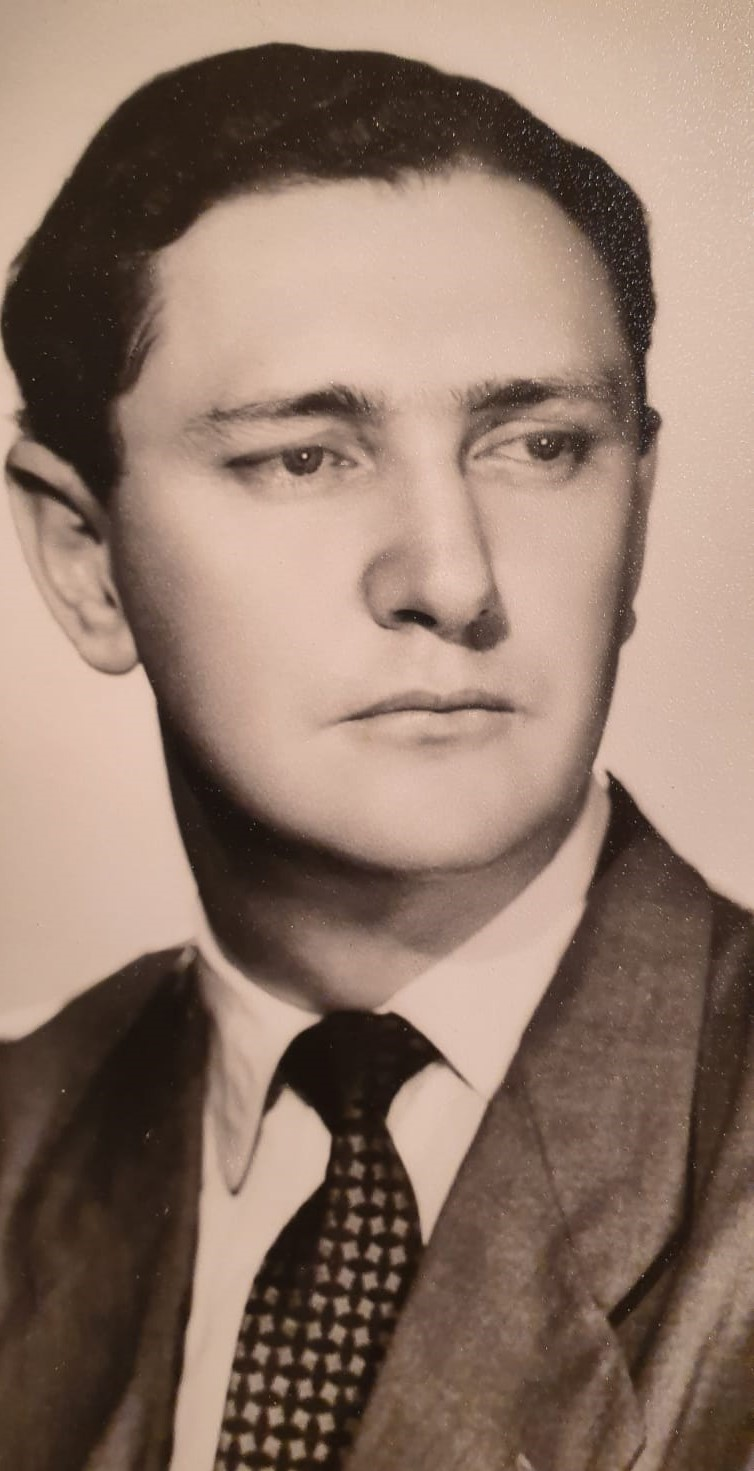
Neil McInnes, 1950

Neil McInnes AM (6 September 1924 – 28 April 2017) was an Australian intellectual, journalist and senior public servant.

His career as a journalist spanned the mid-1940s to the late 1970s in Australia, India and France. His scholarly work focused on the theoretical underpinnings of Marxism as well as the communist parties of Western Europe. In the Australian public service, he occupied several high level posts in intelligence and security from the late 1970s to 2009.

== Early life and background ==
Neil McInnes was born on 6 September 1924 in Sydney, the fifth of seven children. He was educated at Sydney Boys' High School where he won a number of awards, notably for debating. He studied medicine and physiology at The University of Sydney between 1942 and 1947, however he did not graduate. McInnes also took Philosophy 1 with the Challis Professor of Philosophy John Anderson whose influence permeated several generations of students, known as the Andersonians. During World War II, the intellectual life of Sydney was still centred on the university, but towards the end of the war, a small group of students began to meet in various houses to discuss a broad range of intellectual concerns. Along with McInnes, the informal membership of the group included leading students in English, French, German, History, Philosophy and Science such as Paul Foulkes, Ernest Foulkes, Henry Harris, Noel Hush, George Munster, Jim Baker and Bill Maidment. This undergraduate association went by various names, notably The Apostles, though Anderson reportedly coined the name ‘The Poseurs Push’ for the group. McInnes established lifelong friendships with many of these students, as well as others who were also influenced by Anderson, notably Eugene Kamenka. McInnes contributed to student publications, chiefly Hermes and Honi Soit, for a time edited by fellow student Murray Sayle, who soon left the university to start his long and distinguished career as a journalist. At this time McInnes also became close to Harry Hooton, who was drawn to intellectual circles around Sydney University and opposed the generally favoured realist philosophy of Anderson and its activist offshoot, the Libertarian Society. McInnes and Hooton carried on corresponding for many years.

== Career ==
=== Journalism ===
In 1947, McInnes left Sydney with his lifelong companion June (Julie) Turner (1924-2005). He moved to Cairns to work as a journalist for The Cairns Post, sharing a house with Murray Sayle who was also working on the newspaper at the time.

In 1948 he left Australia for Calcutta to become a deputy editor for one of India's oldest newspapers, The Statesman. In 1952 he was promoted to editor of the Calcutta-based financial newspaper Capital. In 1953 and 1954, he was also the permanent correspondent in India of the London-based Commonwealth journal of international affairs, The Round Table.

Following several extended trips to Europe, he moved permanently to France in 1955, living in Paris and later in the Fontainebleau area for ten years. He devoted his time to research and writing. In 1965 Neil McInnes returned to Australia to work for The Australian Financial Review. He moved back to Paris at the end of 1966 when he took up the position of European editor of The Wall Street Journal and Barron’s Financial Weekly. He continued writing for The Australian Financial Review and also wrote for The Guardian.

=== Intellectual thought ===
In the 1960s, McInnes started publishing scholarly articles on Marxist theory, critically examining the roots of the development of Marxism, notably in western European countries such as Germany and France. He focused much of his early work on studying the influence of Georges Sorel on Marxist ideas. He regularly contributed articles on this topic to journals such as Survey, Encounter and Politics. This was a time when a widespread effort was under way to challenge the post-war sympathies with the USSR of many Western intellectuals and fellow travellers, particularly among liberals and the non-Communist Left (notably through the Congress for Cultural Freedom). In the 1970s during his time in Paris as a financial journalist, he wrote four respected books which provided an in-depth analysis on the development and theoretical underpinnings of the Communist parties of Western Europe and Eurocommunism. He was close to a number of French neo-liberal intellectuals known for their opposition to Marxist ideology, notably Jacques Rueff, Raymond Aron and Jean-Francois Revel, who considered that the battle against communism was also one of ideas.

=== Public service career ===
In 1978, McInnes was recruited by Prime Minister Malcolm Fraser to become the Deputy Director (economic) of the newly created Office of National Assessments (ONA), established to provide intelligence assessments on political, strategic and economic issues directly to the Prime Minister. It was reported that Cyrus Vance recommended McInnes to Fraser for this appointment. In 1982 he was promoted to Head of Policy Coordination within the Department of Defence, where his responsibilities included oversight of intelligence and security agencies. He was a Deputy Secretary in the Department of Prime Minister and Cabinet between 1983 and 1986. In this capacity, he was closely involved in providing intelligence and security policy advice to Prime Minister Hawke on both national and international matters. He accompanied the Prime Minister on official visits abroad, notably to the White House in February 1985.

In 1986, McInnes became the inaugural Inspector-General of Intelligence and Security, a position he held until his retirement in September 1989. The creation of this office followed a recommendation by Mr Justice Hope in his Royal Commission reports on the intelligence and security agencies with respect to their accountability.

In June 1989, McInnes was appointed a Member of the Order of Australia (AM) for public service.

=== Later life ===
Between 1990 and 2005, McInnes returned to his career observing and commenting on a range of topics relating to political philosophy and international relations. His articles were published in Quadrant and The National Interest.

Between 1990 and 2008 McInnes was a consultant to the Australian Secret Intelligence Service (ASIS), where he acted as ombudsman. He retired from active public life in 2009 at the age of 85.

He died in Canberra in 2017 aged 92.

== Bibliography ==
=== Articles ===
- "An Examination of the Work of Wilhelm Reich," in Hermes 48, pp. 26–29, 1946
- Les débuts du marxisme théorique en France et en Italie (1880-1897), Études de Marxologie, n° 3, juin 1960
- What Asians Think of Us - I: To Indians: Distant, Insignificant, The Bulletin, 28 December 1960, p. 25
- Lettres et extraits de lettres d’Engels à Bernstein, Présentation de Neil Mclnnes, Études de Marxologie, Janvier 1961, p. 41 - 78
- Antonio Gramsci, Survey, October 1964, pp. 3–15
- Australia - How Provincial?, Quadrant, Vol. 9, No. 5, September–October 1965, pp. 9–17
- Havemann and the Dialectic, Survey, January 1967, pp. 25–37
- The Christian-Marxist Dialogue, Survey, April 1968, pp. 57–76
- Knopfelmacher's Essays (Review), Politics, Vol. 3, Issue 2, 1968, pp. 207–213
- Lenin und der Italienische Sozialismus 1915-1921. Ein Beitrag zur Grundungsgeschichte der Kommunistischen Internationale, Soviet Studies, 10/1968
- Helmut König, "Lenin und der italienische Sozialismus 1915-1921. Ein Beitrag zur Gründungsgeschichte der Kommunistischen Internationale" (Book Review), Soviet Studies, 10/1968
- Knopfelmacher's essays, Politics, v.3, no.2, November 1968, pp207–213
- A caricature of Gramsci, Book review, Politics, Vol. 4, 1969 - Issue 1, pp. 112–118
- Social Democracy since the War, Survey, Winter-Spring 1969, pp. 18–31
- Georg Lukacs, Survey, Summer 1969, pp. 122–140
- The Young Marx and the New Left, Journal of Contemporary History, 01/1971, Vol. 6, Issue 4
- Zionism and its liberal critics, 1896-1948, Journal of Contemporary History, 10/1971, Vol. 6, Issue 4
- Alien Marx, Review of Alienation by Bertell Ollman, Encounter, June 1973, pp. 63–65
- The Communist Parties of Western Europe and the EEC, The World Today, 02/1974, Vol.30, Issue 2
- Justice and Disobedience: Georges Sorel on The Trial of Socrates, Politics, Vol. 10, 1975, Issue 1, pp. 37–43
- "World Communism" in Fragments, book reviews of World Strength of the Communist Party Organizations, by the US Department of State, Bureau of Intelligence And Research (1974) and 1975 Yearbook on International Communist Affairs, edited by Richard F. Starr (1975), in Problems of Communism, November 1975, pp. 43–45
- The coming deluge [Book Review], Quadrant, Vol. 20, No. 5, May 1976, pp. 71–73
- East-West Relations within the Communist Movement, Survey, Summer/Autumn 1976, pp. 102–105
- Communism in Italy and France, Book Review, International Affairs (Royal Institute of International Affairs), 01/1977
- Abstraction, alienation, and commodity, Lecture given at the Harry Eddy School of Philosophy, Sydney Philosophy Club, Quadrant, Vol. 23 Issue 12, December 1979
- Liebestod and after, Quadrant, Vol. 34, No. 4, April 1990, pp. 60–65
- One without the other [Book Review], Quadrant, Vol. 36, No. 3, March 1992, pp. 80–81
- Islam and the West, Quadrant, Vol. 36, No. 4, April 1992, pp. 6–7
- The culture state [Book Review] Quadrant, Vol. 36, No. 6, June 1992, pp. 84–85
- Monsieur le Pen's politics, Quadrant, Vol. 36, No. 10, October 1992, pp. 10–13
- What's left of the Oedipus complex? Quadrant, Vol. 36, No.12, December 1992, pp. 30–37
- The nation state vs. the global society, IPA Review (Institute of Public Affairs), Vol.46, No.1, 1993, pp. 40–42
- From melting pot to salad bowl. Review of Kukathas, Chandran (ed.). Multicultural Citizens: the Philosophy and Politics of Identity, 1993, IPA Review (Institute of Public Affairs), Vol.46, No.3, 1993, pp. 30–32
- Heidegger's Nazism, Quadrant, Vol. 37, No. 4, April 1993, pp. 31–35
- Enough Said, Review of Culture and Imperialism, by Edward W. Said, The National Interest, Fall 1993, pp. 104–108
- Bad Books: Move Over, Blinky Bill, The Choice of Botany Bay, Manning Clark, Melbourne, 1960. Institute of Public Affairs Review, Vol. 47, No.1, pp. 49–50, 1994.
- One Who Made A Revolution, Review of Robert Skidelsky and John Maynard Keynes' The Economist as Saviour 1920-1937, The National Interest, Fall 1994.
- Capitalism, Socialism and Democracy by Joseph A. Schumpeter (Book Review), The National Interest, Spring 1995, p. 85
- Ortega and the Myth of the Mass, The National Interest, Summer 1996, pp. 78–88
- Volkogonov's Journey, The National Interest, Winter 1996, pp. 47–54
- The Great Doomsayer: Oswald Spengler Reconsidered, The National Interest, Summer 1997
- Hayek's Slippery Slope, The National Interest, Spring 1998, pp. 56–66
- The Road Not Taken, (Foreword by Chadran Kukathas), The Center for Independent Studies, Occasional paper No. 65, November 1998.
- "Orientalism", the Evolution of a Concept, The National Interest, Winter 1998, pp. 73–81
- Koestler and His Jewish Thesis, Review of Arthur Koestler: The Homeless Mind, by David Cesarani, The National Interest, Fall 1999, pp. 103–109
- A Skeptical Conservative, The National Interest, Fall 2000, pp. 82–89
- The Long Goodbye, The National Interest, Summer 2001, pp. 105–114
- Popper's Return Engagement, The National Interest, Spring 2002, pp. 72–80
- The Failure of Africa, Quadrant, Vol. 47, No. 4, Apr 2003: pp. 18–22
- Requiem for a Genocide, Review of "The Fabrication of Aboriginal History" by Keith Windschuttle, The National Interest, Summer 2004, pp. 176–183
- The Strange Journey of a Bad Idea, The American Interest, Vol. 1 No.2, December 2005

=== Contributions to Books ===
- The Labour Movement, in "The Impact of the Russian Revolution, 1917-1967 : the influence of Bolshevism on the world outside Russia", issued under the auspices of the Royal Institute of International Affairs, Oxford University Press, 1967
- Georges Sorel, in "The founding Fathers of Social Science", edited by Timothy Raison, Baltimore, Penguin Books, 1969
- Articles on Engels, Friedrich; Gracián Y Morales, Baltasar; Gramsci, Antonio; Labriola, Antonio; Lukács, Georg; Marías, Julián; Marxist Philosophy; Ortega Y Gasset, José; Sorel, Georges; Zubiri, Xavier, in "Encyclopedia of Philosophy", Macmillan, first edition 1973; Second Edition 2006, Donald M. Borchert, Editor in Chief, Thomson Gale, Thomson, Star Logo and Macmillan
- Ethics as the Theory of History, in "Liberty and Politics: Studies in Social Theory" edited by Owen Harries, Pergamon Press, 1976
- From Comintern to Polycentrism: the First Fifty Years of West European Communism, in "Euro-Communism, Myth or Reality", edited by Paolo Filo della Torre, Edward Mortimer and Jonathan Story, Penguin Books, 1979
- The Long Goodbye, or Eric’s Consoling Lies, in "The Strange Death of Soviet Communism: A Postscript", edited by Nikolas K. Gvosdev, Transaction Publishers, 2008

=== Books ===
- The Western Marxists, Library Press, 1972
- The Communist Parties of Western Europe, Oxford University Press, 1975
- Euro-communism, published for the Center for Strategic and International Studies, Georgetown University, by Sage Publications, 1976
- French Politics Today: The Future of the Fifth Republic, Sage Publications, 1977
