= Christopher Jessup (judge) =

Australian judge

The Honourable Christopher Jessup KC

Inspector-General of Intelligence and Security
- Incumbent
- Assumed office 18 January 2021

Judge of the Federal Court of Australia
- In office 23 June 2006 – 15 April 2017

Personal details
- Born: Melbourne, Victoria
- Education: Monash University
- Occupation: Judge, lawyer

Christopher Jessup KC is an Australian lawyer who serves as Inspector-General of Intelligence and Security. Between 2006 and 2017, he was a judge of the Federal Court of Australia.

== Early life ==
Jessup was born in Melbourne, Victoria. He attended Malvern Memorial Grammar School and Scotch College, Melbourne. He graduated from Monash University with a Bachelor of Economics with honours in 1968 and a Bachelor of Laws with honours in 1970. He finished equal-first in his graduating year and shared the Supreme Court Prize with Justice Mark Weinberg of the Federal Court and later the Victorian Court of Appeal.

== Career ==
Jessup completed his articles of clerkship with Stephen Alley, who later became a judge on the Australian Conciliation and Arbitration Commission, in the firm Moule, Hamilton and Derham. In 1974, Jessup completed a PhD at the London School of Economics and Political Science, where his thesis focused on the operation of industrial relations law on trade unions in the United Kingdom and Australia. In 1975, Jessup commenced practice as a barrister at the Victorian Bar, specialising in employment law and industrial relations.

Jessup was appointed to the Federal Court of Australia in 2006. He retired in 2017 and returned to practice as a barrister. In 2019, the Family Court of Australia announced that it appointed Jessup to oversee the development of unified family law processes, including the functioning of the Family Court and case management.

In December 2020, the Australian Government announced the appointment of Jessup as Acting Inspector-General of Intelligence and Security, to take effect from 18 January 2021. On 4 February 2021 his appointment was confirmed in the role for a five year term.
