= Bruce Parncutt =

Bruce Parncutt AO
- Born: Jeffrey Bruce Parncutt; 1951 (age 74–75); Melbourne, Victoria, Australia
- Occupations: Non-executive Director, Investor, Philanthropist
- Spouse: Robin Campbell [div.]
- Partner: Lisa Bowman
- Children: 2
- Awards: Officer of the Order of Australia (AO), 2016

Bruce Parncutt is an Australian business executive, investor and philanthropist known for his contributions to investment banking, investment management and the arts. He has served in senior roles at financial and arts organisations in Australia.

== Career ==
Parncutt began his career in finance, with roles in investment banking and securities markets. He served as Managing Director of McIntosh Securities, Senior Vice President at Merrill Lynch, and Director of both the Australian Stock Exchange (ASX) and the Stock Exchange of Melbourne.

== Philanthropy and arts involvement ==
Parncutt served as President of the Council of Trustees at the National Gallery of Victoria (NGV) and continues as an Emeritus Trustee and Life Member. He has also held roles as Chairman of the NGV Foundation, a member of the Felton Bequest Committee, a Board Member of the Australian Ballet, Board Member of Melbourne Grammar School, Member of the Melbourne Grammar School Council, and a Trustee of the Parncutt Family Foundation.

== Current roles ==
As of 2024, Parncutt holds roles including Chairman of Lion Capital Advisory Pty Ltd, Chairman and Trustee of the Helen Macpherson Smith Trust, Chairman of Birrarung Valley Walk Inc., and Chairman of New Edge Microbials Pty Ltd.

== Honors and awards ==
In 2016, Parncutt was appointed as an Officer of the Order of Australia (AO) for his contributions to philanthropy, the arts, education, and business.
