= List of Australian Commonwealth Ombudsmen =

Below is a list of all the people who have held the role of Commonwealth Ombudsman since establishment of the position by the Government of Australia in 1977.

Ombudsman	Appointed
Prof. Jack Richardson	March 1977
Air Vice-Marshal Jordan AO (Acting)	23 September 1985
Geoffery Kolts	1 July 1986
Kevin Sainsbury (Acting)	31 October 1987
Prof. Dennis Pearce	1 February 1988
Alan Cameron	1 April 1991
Lindsay Shaw (Acting)	December 1992
Philippa Smith AM	17 May 1993
Ron McLeod	18 February 1998
John McMillan	16 May 2003
Allan Asher	23 July 2010
Alison Larkins (Acting)	20 October 2011
Colin Neave	16 August 2012
Michael Manthorpe PSM	8 May 2017
