= Inspector-General of Intelligence and Security (Australia) =

Australian government position

Agency overview
- Jurisdiction: Commonwealth
- Headquarters: 1 National Circuit, Barton ACT 2600
- Minister responsible: Michelle Rowland, Attorney-General of Australia
- Agency executive: The Honourable Christopher Jessup KC, Inspector-General

The Inspector-General of Intelligence and Security (IGIS) is an independent statutory office holder in the Commonwealth of Australia responsible for reviewing the activities of the six intelligence agencies under IGIS jurisdiction. With own motion powers in addition to considering complaints or requests from ministers, IGIS is a key element of the accountability regime for Australia’s intelligence and security agencies.

The six intelligence and security agencies under IGIS jurisdiction are:

- Australian Geospatial-Intelligence Organisation (AGO)
- Australian Secret Intelligence Service (ASIS)
- Australian Security Intelligence Organisation (ASIO)
- Australian Signals Directorate (ASD)
- Defence Intelligence Organisation (DIO)
- Office of National Intelligence (ONI)

In addition, the Surveillance Legislation (Identify and Disrupt) Act 2021 expanded IGIS’s jurisdiction to include oversight of the use of network activity warrants by the Australian Criminal Intelligence Commission and the Australian Federal Police.

== History ==
The office was formally established by the Inspector-General of Intelligence and Security Act 1986 (the IGIS Act) and commenced operating on 1 February 1987. The inaugural Inspector for Intelligence and Security was Neil McInnes.

The Office of the Inspector-General of Intelligence and Security is situated within the Attorney-General's portfolio for administrative purposes, but as an independent statutory office holder, the IGIS is not subject to general direction from the Attorney-General on how the functions under the IGIS Act should be carried out.

== Role and functions ==
The role and functions of the IGIS are set out in sections 8, 9 and 9A of the IGIS Act. These sections of the IGIS Act provide a legal basis for the IGIS to conduct regular inspections of the intelligence agencies and to conduct inquiries, of varying levels of formality, as the need arises. The functions of the Inspector‑General do not include inquiring into the matters to which a complaint made to the Inspector‑General by an employee of an agency relates to the extent that those matters are directly related to the promotion, termination of appointment, discipline or remuneration of the complainant or to other matters relating to the complainant’s employment.

The IGIS:

- regularly visits agencies to check their records
- conducts special inquiries into agency activities
- investigates complaints about the agencies, and
- reports the results of inquiries to Ministers, the Prime Minister and the Parliament.

The overarching purpose of these activities is to ensure that each intelligence agency acts legally and with propriety, complies with ministerial guidelines and directives, and respects human rights. The majority of the resources of the office are directed towards on-going inspection and monitoring activities, so as to identify issues or concerns before they develop into major problems which then require remedial action. The inspection role of the IGIS is complemented by the Inspector-General’s inquiry function. In undertaking inquiries the Inspector-General has very strong investigative powers, akin to those of a Royal Commission.

Inquiries are conducted in private because they frequently involve highly classified or sensitive information, and the methods by which it is collected. The public ventilation of this material would be potentially very harmful to those persons involved in its collection, or compromise collection, neither of which would serve the national interest.

The intelligence agencies are also subject to review by the Parliamentary Joint Committee on Intelligence and Security as well as the Australian National Audit Office. Certain ASIO assessments can be appealed to the Administrative Appeals Tribunal for a merits review of a decision. Proceedings can also be instituted against AIC agencies in the Courts.

== Inspectors-General ==
The Inspector-General of Intelligence and Security is appointed by the Governor-General under the Inspector-General of Intelligence and Security Act 1986.

As an independent statutory office holder, the Inspector-General is not subject to general direction from the Attorney-General, or other Ministers, on how their responsibilities under the IGIS Act should be carried out. This ensures the independence and integrity of IGIS’s review responsibilities.

- The Hon Christopher Jessup QC (2021–present)
- The Hon Margaret Stone AO FAAL (2015–2020)
- Dr Vivienne Thom AM (2010–2015)
- Mr Ian Carnell (2004–2010)
- Mr W.J. (Bill) Blick AM, PSM (1998–2004)
- Mr R.N. (Ron) McLeod AM (1995–1998)
- Mr J.R. (Roger) Holdich AM (1989–1995)
- Mr N.D. (Neil) McInnes AM (1987–1989)

== See also ==
- Australian Intelligence Community
