= List of judges of the Supreme Court of Queensland =

Judges who have served on the Supreme Court of Queensland, as of February 2019, include:

- Chief Justice of Queensland
- Judges of the Court of Appeal
- Judges

Position	Name	Appointment commenced	Appointment ended	Term in office	Comments	Notes
Chief Justice	James Cockle	21 February 1863	24 June 1879	16 years, 123 days	Died 27 January 1895	
Chief Justice	Charles Lilley	25 June 1879	13 March 1893	13 years, 261 days	Died 20 August 1897	
Chief Justice	Samuel Griffith	13 March 1893	4 October 1903	10 years, 205 days	Appointed Chief Justice of Australia, died 9 August 1920	
Chief Justice	Pope Cooper	21 October 1903	31 March 1922 (Note: Pope Cooper, Patrick Real and Charles Chubb were compulsorily retired as a result of the Judges Retirement Act 1921 (Qld),)	18 years, 161 days	Died 30 August 1923	
Chief Justice	Thomas McCawley	1 April 1922	16 April 1925	3 years, 15 days	Died in office	
Chief Justice	James Blair	24 April 1925	16 May 1940	15 years, 22 days	Died 18 November 1944	
Chief Justice	Hugh Macrossan (Note: Brothers Hugh and Neal Macrossan as well as their nephew John Macrossan were all appointed Chief Justice)	17 May 1940	23 June 1940	37 days	Died in office	
Chief Justice	William Webb	27 June 1940	15 May 1946	5 years, 322 days	Appointed to the High Court, died 11 August 1972	
Chief Justice	Neal Macrossan	23 April 1946	30 December 1955	9 years, 251 days	Died in office	
Chief Justice	Alan Mansfield	9 February 1956	21 February 1966	10 years, 12 days	Appointed Governor of Queensland, died 17 July 1980	
Chief Justice	William Mack	24 February 1966	12 May 1971	5 years, 77 days	Died 26 July 1979	
Chief Justice	Mostyn Hanger	13 May 1971	18 July 1977	6 years, 66 days	Died 11 August 1980	
Chief Justice	Charles Wanstall	19 July 1977	17 February 1982	4 years, 213 days	Died 17 October 1999	
Chief Justice	Walter Campbell	18 February 1982	7 July 1985	3 years, 139 days	Appointed Governor of Queensland, died 4 September 2004	
Chief Justice	Dormer Andrews	8 July 1985	7 April 1989	3 years, 273 days	Died 28 July 2004	
Chief Justice	John Macrossan	10 April 1989	16 February 1998	8 years, 312 days	Died 5 August 2008	
Chief Justice	Paul de Jersey	17 February 1998	8 July 2014	16 years, 141 days	Appointed Governor of Queensland	
Chief Justice	Tim Carmody	8 July 2014	1 July 2015	358 days	Chief Magistrate, Magistrates Court (2013–2014); Judge, District Court (Qld) (2013–2014); Judge, Family Court of Australia (2003–2008)	
Chief Justice	Catherine Holmes	11 September 2015	19 March 2022	6 years, 189 days		
Chief Justice	Helen Bowskill	19 March 2022		4 years, 219 days		
Acting Chief Justice	Hugh Fraser	1 July 2015	24 July 2015	23 days		
President, Court of Appeal	Tony Fitzgerald	16 December 1991	30 June 1998	6 years, 196 days		
President, Court of Appeal	Margaret McMurdo (Note: Philip McMurdo is the husband of Margaret McMurdo, the former President of the Court of Appeal.)	30 July 1998	24 March 2017	18 years, 237 days		
President, Court of Appeal	Walter Sofronoff	3 April 2017	20 May 2022	9 years, 204 days		
President, Court of Appeal	Debra Mullins	20 May 2022		4 years, 157 days		
Judge of Appeal	Cecil Pincus	16 January 1991	3 March 2001	10 years, 46 days	Died 16 October 2014	
Judge of Appeal	Bruce McPherson	12 December 1991	23 September 2006	14 years, 285 days	Died 7 October 2013	
Judge of Appeal	Geoffrey Davies	16 December 1991	11 February 2005	13 years, 57 days		
Judge of Appeal	James Thomas	30 July 1998	22 March 2002	3 years, 235 days		
Judge of Appeal	Glen Williams	14 December 2000	23 January 2008	7 years, 40 days		
Judge of Appeal	Catherine Holmes	26 May 2006	10 September 2015	9 years, 107 days		
Judge of Appeal	John Muir	12 July 2007	27 December 2014	7 years, 168 days	Died 10 February 2018	
Judge of Appeal	Hugh Fraser	25 January 2008	16 July 2022	14 years, 172 days		
Judge of Appeal	Margaret White	15 April 2010	3 June 2013	3 years, 49 days		
Judge of Appeal	Robert Gotterson	27 April 2012	28 December 2019	7 years, 245 days		
Judge of Appeal	Phillip Morrison	1 August 2013		13 years, 84 days		
Judge of Appeal	Anthe Philippides	18 December 2014	23 April 2021	6 years, 130 days	President of the Land Appeal Court, Judge and President of the Mental Health Court	
Judge of Appeal	Philip McMurdo	24 November 2015		10 years, 334 days		
Judge of Appeal	John Bond	27 April 2021		5 years, 180 days		
Judge of Appeal	Jean Dalton	21 May 2022		4 years, 156 days		
Judge of Appeal	Peter Flanagan	16 July 2022		4 years, 100 days		
Additional Judge of Appeal	Margaret Wilson	10 February 2011	2012	1 year		
Senior Puisne Judge (Note: In 1995 the position of Senior Puisne Judge was renamed Senior Judge Administrator.)	Pope Cooper	October 1895	20 October 1903	7 years, 354 days	Appointed Chief Justice	
Senior Puisne Judge	Patrick Real	13 November 1903	31 March 1922	18 years, 138 days	Died 10 June 1928	
Senior Puisne Judge	Hugh Macrossan	1 December 1926	17 May 1940	13 years, 168 days	Died in office	
Senior Puisne Judge	William Webb	17 May 1940	26 June 1940	40 days	Appointed to the High Court, died 11 August 1972	
Senior Puisne Judge	Neal Macrossan	1 July 1940	22 April 1946	5 years, 295 days	Died in office	
Senior Puisne Judge	Alan Mansfield	20 March 1947	8 February 1956	8 years, 325 days	Appointed Governor of Queensland, died 17 July 1980	
Senior Puisne Judge	Roslyn Philp	9 February 1956	19 March 1965	9 years, 38 days	Died in office	
Senior Puisne Judge	Joseph Sheehy	15 April 1965	14 April 1970	4 years, 364 days	Died 22 September 1971	
Senior Puisne Judge	Mostyn Hanger	15 April 1970	12 May 1971	1 year, 27 days	Died 11 August 1980	
Senior Puisne Judge	Norton Stable	19 July 1977	22 October 1979	2 years, 95 days	Died 12 May 1989	
Senior Puisne Judge	Geoffrey Lucas	15 November 1979	17 February 1982	2 years, 94 days	Died 28 November 1992	
Senior Puisne Judge	Dormer Andrews	18 February 1982	7 July 1985	3 years, 139 days	Died 28 July 2004	
Senior Puisne Judge	Jack Kelly	8 July 1985	24 September 1990	5 years, 78 days	Died 20 April 1999	
Senior Puisne Judge	Bruce McPherson	25 September 1990	11 December 1991	1 year, 77 days	Died 7 October 2013	
Senior Puisne Judge	Martin Moynihan	16 December 1991	24 August 2007	15 years, 251 days	Died 2 April 2017	
Senior Judge Administrator	John Byrne	24 August 2007	23 August 2017	9 years, 364 days		
Senior Judge Administrator	Ann Lyons	24 August 2017	23 August 2021	3 years, 364 days		
Senior Judge Administrator	Helen Bowskill	24 August 2021	18 March 2022	206 days		
Senior Judge Administrator	Glenn Martin	18 March 2022		0 days		
Judge at Moreton Bay (Note: Prior to the separation of the Moreton Bay district of New South Wales into the independent colony of Queensland, the Supreme Court of New South Wales was the superior court in the District. A judge was resident at Moreton Bay from 1856 and a local division of the court, named the Supreme Court at Moreton Bay, was established in 1857, and existed until the Supreme Court of Queensland was created in 1861.)	Samuel Milford	21 January 1856	14 February 1859	3 years, 24 days		
Judge at Moreton Bay	Alfred Lutwyche	15 February 1859	7 August 1861	2 years, 173 days	Appointed first judge of the Supreme Court of Queensland.	
Judge	Alfred Lutwyche	7 August 1861	12 June 1880	18 years, 310 days	Previously resident judge at Moreton Bay. Died in office	
Judge	Edmund Sheppard	17 July 1874	22 December 1882	8 years, 158 days	Died in office	
Judge	Charles Lilley	4 July 1874	13 March 1893	18 years, 252 days	Died 20 August 1897	
Judge	George Harding	14 July 1879	31 August 1885	6 years, 48 days	Died in office	
Judge	Ratcliffe Pring	11 November 1880	25 March 1885	4 years, 134 days	Died in office	
Judge	Pope Cooper	5 January 1883	31 March 1922	39 years, 85 days	Died 30 August 1923	
Judge	Charles Mein	17 April 1885	30 June 1890	5 years, 74 days	Died in office	
Judge	Charles Chubb	2 December 1889	31 March 1922	32 years, 119 days	Died 27 February 1930	
Judge	Patrick Real	18 July 1890	31 March 1922	31 years, 256 days	Died 10 June 1928	
Judge	Virgil Power	20 December 1895	20 December 1910	15 years, 0 days	Died 2 June 1914	
Judge	William Shand	3 November 1908	30 June 1925	16 years, 239 days	Died 4 March 1942	
Judge	Lionel Lukin	26 July 1910	18 July 1926	15 years, 357 days	Subsequently appointed to the Federal Court of Bankruptcy, died 1 June 1944	
Judge	Thomas McCawley	12 October 1917	16 April 1925	7 years, 186 days	Died in office	
Judge	James Blair	1 April 1922	16 May 1940	18 years, 45 days	Died 18 November 1944	
Judge	Allan MacNaughton	1 April 1922	21 March 1929	6 years, 354 days	Died 8 May 1937	
Judge	Charles Jameson	1 April 1922	16 December 1922	259 days	Died 28 June 1936	
Judge	Thomas O'Sullivan	1 April 1922	15 December 1926	4 years, 258 days	Died 22 February 1953	
Judge	Robert Douglas	24 January 1923	13 April 1953	30 years, 79 days	Died 24 December 1972	
Judge	William Webb	24 April 1925	15 May 1946	21 years, 21 days	Appointed to the High Court, died 11 August 1972	
Judge	Frank Brennan	1 July 1925	6 August 1949	24 years, 36 days	Died in office	
Judge	Hugh Macrossan	23 July 1926	23 June 1940	13 years, 336 days	Died in office	
Judge	John Woolcock	1 February 1927	18 January 1929	1 year, 352 days	Died in office	
Judge	Charles Stumm	6 February 1929	28 February 1929	22 days	Died in office	
Judge	Edward Douglas	22 March 1929	27 August 1947	18 years, 158 days	Died in office	
Judge	Hereward Henchman	5 March 1929	25 April 1939	10 years, 51 days	Died in office	
Judge	Roslyn Philp	4 May 1939	19 March 1965	25 years, 319 days	Died in office	
Judge	Alan Mansfield	17 May 1940	21 February 1966	25 years, 280 days	Appointed Governor of Queensland, died 17 July 1980	
Judge	Neal Macrossan	27 June 1940	30 December 1955	15 years, 186 days	Died in office	
Judge	Benjamin Matthews	25 April 1946	21 December 1961	15 years, 240 days	Died 5 June 1974	
Judge	Edwin Stanley	6 February 1947	30 October 1964	17 years, 267 days	Died 23 May 1993	
Judge	Joseph Sheehy	2 September 1947	14 April 1970	22 years, 224 days	Died 22 September 1971	
Judge	Kenneth Townley	8 August 1949	30 July 1962	12 years, 356 days	Died 28 August 1981	
Judge	William Mack	20 July 1950	12 May 1971	20 years, 296 days	Died 26 July 1979	
Judge	Thomas O'Hagan	16 October 1952	18 July 1958	5 years, 275 days	Died in office	
Judge	Thomas Barry	20 November 1952	3 February 1955	2 years, 75 days	Died 20 October 1970	
Judge	Mostyn Hanger	23 July 1953	18 July 1977	23 years, 360 days	Died 11 August 1980	
Judge	Leslie Brown	10 February 1955	12 December 1961	6 years, 305 days	Died in office	
Judge	Bernard Jeffriess	2 February 1956	10 July 1965	9 years, 158 days	Died 16 November 1969	
Judge	Charles Wanstall	27 February 1958	17 February 1982	23 years, 355 days	Died 17 October 1999	
Judge	Norton Stable	24 July 1958	22 October 1979	21 years, 90 days	Died 12 May 1989	
Judge	Harry Gibbs	8 June 1961	24 June 1967	6 years, 16 days	Appointed to the Federal Court of Bankruptcy, then High Court of Australia in 1970, including as Chief Justice of Australia 1981. Died 25 June 2005	
Judge	Russell Skerman	9 August 1962	21 September 1973	11 years, 43 days	Died 24 February 1983	
Judge	Geoffrey Lucas	18 November 1963	17 February 1982	18 years, 91 days	Died 23 November 1992	
Judge	Graham Hart	11 February 1963	18 April 1974	11 years, 66 days	Died in office	
Judge	James Douglas	11 February 1965	2 February 1984	18 years, 356 days	Died in office	
Judge	Douglas Campbell	11 February 1965	4 August 1985	20 years, 174 days	Died 12 July 2003	
Judge	Marcus Hoare	12 May 1966	3 March 1980	13 years, 296 days	Died 11 July 1999	
Judge	Walter Campbell	1 August 1967	7 July 1985	17 years, 340 days	Appointed Governor of Queensland, died 4 September 2004	
Judge	Ronald Matthews	14 August 1967	10 February 1989	21 years, 180 days	Died 2 July 1998	
Judge	George Kneipp	6 November 1969	13 November 1992	23 years, 7 days	Died 15 February 1993	
Judge	Dormer Andrews	13 May 1971	7 April 1989	17 years, 329 days	Died 28 July 2004	
Judge	Edward Williams	13 May 1971	17 February 1984	12 years, 280 days	Died 10 January 1999	
Judge	Jack Kelly	25 September 1973	24 September 1990	16 years, 364 days	Died 20 April 1999	
Judge	James Dunn	30 April 1974	29 March 1983	8 years, 333 days	Died in office	
Judge	Charles Sheahan	20 January 1977	25 January 1985	8 years, 5 days	Died 30 November 1997	
Judge	Peter Connolly	31 October 1977	29 September 1990	12 years, 333 days	Died 3 May 2009	
Judge	Alan Demack	16 January 1978	19 May 2000	22 years, 124 days		
Judge	John Macrossan	4 February 1980	16 February 1998	8 years, 312 days	Died 5 August 2008	
Judge	Bruce McPherson	28 January 1982	23 September 2006	24 years, 238 days	Died 7 October 2013	
Judge	Glen Williams	3 December 1982	23 January 2008	25 years, 51 days		
Judge	Desmond Derrington	3 December 1982	4 April 2000	17 years, 123 days		
Judge	James Thomas	18 February 1982	22 March 2002	20 years, 32 days		
Judge	Tom Shepherdson	18 February 1982	10 March 2000	18 years, 21 days	Died 27 October 2015	
Judge	William Carter	12 May 1983	31 May 1990	7 years, 19 days		
Judge	Kevin Ryan	13 February 1984	15 April 1994	10 years, 61 days	Died 18 November 2009	
Judge	Angelo Vasta	13 February 1984	8 June 1989	5 years, 115 days	Removed from office by Parliament. Died 29 September 2021	
Judge	Martin Moynihan	13 February 1984	24 August 2007	23 years, 192 days	Died 2 April 2017	
Judge	Paul de Jersey	4 February 1985	8 July 2014	29 years, 154 days	Appointed Governor of Queensland	
Judge	John Dowsett	29 July 1985	13 September 1998	13 years, 46 days	Appointed to the Federal Court	
Judge	Brian Ambrose	8 July 1985	11 September 2003	18 years, 65 days	Died 31 December 2015	
Judge	Richard Cooper	2 February 1989	30 March 1992	3 years, 57 days	Appointed to the Federal Court, died 15 March 2005	
Judge	William Lee	20 February 1989	30 April 1999	10 years, 69 days		
Judge	Kenneth Mackenzie	10 April 1989	8 December 2008	19 years, 242 days		
Judge	John Byrne	25 July 1989	23 August 2017	28 years, 29 days		
Judge	Margaret White	2 April 1992	3 June 2013	21 years, 62 days		
Judge	Susan Kiefel	16 June 1993	16 October 1994	1 year, 122 days	Appointed to the Federal Court	
Judge	Henry George Fryberg	23 September 1994	28 November 2013	19 years, 66 days		
Judge	John Helman	16 December 1994	1 July 2007	12 years, 197 days		
Judge	John Muir	4 April 1997	27 December 2014	17 years, 267 days	Died 10 February 2018	
Judge	Stanley Jones	2 October 1997	9 September 2011	13 years, 342 days		
Judge	Margaret Wilson	21 August 1998	11 April 2014	15 years, 233 days		
Judge	Roslyn Atkinson	3 September 1998	29 November 2018	20 years, 87 days	Chair, Law Reform Commission	
Judge	Anthe Philippides	14 December 2000		25 years, 314 days	President, Land Appeal Court; Judge and President, Mental Health Court	
Judge	Catherine Holmes	16 March 2000		26 years, 222 days	Judge, Mental Health Court (2000–04); Acting Judge, District Court (Qld) (1999)	
Judge	Debra Mullins	16 March 2000		26 years, 222 days	Criminal List Judge	
Judge	Peter Dutney	16 March 2000	4 September 2009	9 years, 172 days	Died in office	
Judge	James Douglas	27 November 2003		22 years, 331 days		
Judge	Philip McMurdo	3 March 2003		23 years, 235 days		
Judge	Ann Lyons	7 July 2006		20 years, 109 days		
Judge	Duncan McMeekin	15 October 2007	23 April 2018	10 years, 190 days	(Central Judge, Rockhampton); Land Appeal Court (Central Division)	
Judge	Martin Daubney	13 July 2007		19 years, 103 days	President QCAT (2017-)	
Judge	Glenn Martin	30 August 2007		19 years, 55 days		
Judge	Peter Applegarth	28 August 2008		18 years, 57 days		
Judge	Alan Wilson	27 October 2009	27 March 2015	5 years, 151 days	President, QCAT (2009–2013)	
Judge	David Boddice	2 July 2010		16 years, 114 days		
Judge	Jean Dalton	25 February 2011		15 years, 241 days	Mental Health Court	
Judge	David North	18 July 2011		15 years, 98 days	(Northern Judge Townsville) Mental Health Court	
Judge	David Thomas	18 July 2011	28 June 2017	5 years, 345 days	(Northern Judge Townsville); President Queensland Civil and Administrative Tribunal QCAT (2013 – 2017); President Administrative Appeals Tribunal (2017) appointed as a Judge of the Federal Court	
Judge	James Henry	12 September 2011		15 years, 42 days	(Far North, Cairns), Land Appeal Court (Far Northern Division)	
Judge	David Jackson	8 October 2012		14 years, 16 days		
Judge	Martin Burns	18 December 2014		11 years, 310 days		
Judge	Peter Flanagan	27 July 2014		12 years, 89 days		
Judge	Tim Carmody	8 July 2014		12 years, 108 days	Chief Magistrate, Magistrates Court (2013–2014); Judge, District Court (Qld) (2013–2014); Judge, Family Court of Australia (2003–2008)	
Judge	John Bond	19 March 2015		11 years, 219 days		
Judge	Susan Brown	16 December 2016		9 years, 312 days		
Judge	Peter Davis	16 October 2017		9 years, 8 days		
Judge	Helen Bowskill	10 July 2017		9 years, 106 days	Judge, District Court (Qld) (2014–2017)	
Judge	Graeme Crow	26 February 2018		8 years, 240 days	(Central Judge, Rockhampton)	
Judge	Soraya Ryan	9 March 2018		8 years, 229 days		
Judge	Elizabeth Wilson	3 December 2018		7 years, 325 days		
Judge	Thomas Bradley	3 December 2018		7 years, 325 days		
Judge	Peter Callaghan	10 February 2020		6 years, 256 days		
Judge	Frances Williams	17 February 2020		6 years, 249 days		
Judge	Paul Freeburn	20 May 2021		5 years, 157 days		
Judge	Declan Kelly	6 September 2021		5 years, 48 days		
Judge	Kerri Mellifont	4 October 2021		5 years, 20 days		
Judge	Sean Cooper	11 April 2022		4 years, 196 days		
Judge	Melanie Hindman	30 May 2022		4 years, 147 days		
Judge	Lincoln Crowley	13 June 2022		4 years, 133 days	Justice Crowley is the first Indigenous judge to be appointed to a superior court in Australia.	
Judge	Tom Sullivan	24 February 2023				
Judge	Catherine Muir	11 April 2023				
Judge	Michael Copley	8 May 2024				
Judge	Rebecca Treston	8 May 2024				

== See also ==
- Judiciary of Australia
