= Murder of Leanne Holland =

Murder of a 12 year-old in Australia

Leanne Holland
- Born: Leanne Sarah Holland; 1 October 1978; Goodna, Queensland, Australia
- Died: 23 September 1991 (aged 12); Redbank Plains, Queensland, Australia
- Cause of death: Blunt force trauma
- Body discovered: 26 September 1991
- Known for: Murder victim

Leanne Sarah Holland (1 October 1978 – 23 September 1991) was an Australian girl from Goodna, Queensland, who was murdered in September 1991, when she was 12 years old. Her mutilated body was found in nearby Redbank Plains, three days after she was reported missing. Graham Stafford, her sister's live-in boyfriend, was convicted of her murder. Stafford's conviction was quashed as a miscarriage of justice after he had served 14 years in prison.

== Disappearance and murder ==
Leanne Holland, the youngest of three siblings, lived with her divorced father in Alice Street, Goodna. Holland's sister and her boyfriend (a British-born sheet-metal worker named Graham Stuart Stafford (born May 1963), who had emigrated to the Sunshine Coast with his family in 1969) were also living in the same house since June 1991.

On 23 September 1991, the first day of the school holidays, at around 9:30 am, Holland (who was alone in the house with Stafford) left to walk to the hairdressers at the nearby shops. She was reported missing to police at 5:45 pm the next day after her family assumed she had spent the night with friends. Authorities were concerned, given other recent nearby disappearances, namely that of Sharron Phillips in May 1986 and Julie-Anne Gallon in August 1990.

Three days after last being seen, at 1:42 pm, her partially clothed and shoeless body was found in bushland on Redbank Plains Road by two policemen searching the area on trail bikes. She had been killed with at least ten blows to the head from a blunt instrument, and there were burn marks on her lower body, possibly from a lighter or cigarette. There were no obvious signs of sexual assault and the injuries were so severe, the body had to be identified by its fingerprints.

== Stafford’s conviction and appeals ==
On 28 September, based on circumstantial and forensic evidence from the house, his vehicle, and the crime scene, Stafford was arrested and charged with her murder. The case was prosecuted by David Bullock, and he was convicted on 25 March 1992 of killing Holland with a hammer, and sentenced to 15 years to life in prison. Stafford's appeal in August 1992 to the Queensland Court of Appeal was dismissed by justices Geoffrey Davies, Bruce McPherson and James Thomas. His application for special leave to appeal to the High Court was refused on 4 March 1993.

Stafford sought a pardon and, in June 1997, the Attorney-General referred the case to the Court of Appeal, to be determined as if it was an appeal by a person convicted. In September, justices Davies and McPherson dismissed the appeal, but justice Tony Fitzgerald dissented, finding that the jury convicted Stafford on the basis of evidence which presented a significantly mistaken version of events and that a new trial was warranted. Stafford's application for special leave to appeal to the High Court was refused on 17 April 1998.

Paul Wilson, chair of the Department of Criminology at Bond University, headed a pro bono team of lawyers making appeals on Stafford's behalf. Graeme Crowley, a private investigator and former police officer, led an investigation into the murder. Investigation revealed a possible sighting of Holland alive the day after Stafford said that he last saw her, other unsolved murders in the neighborhood, and two potential suspects not interviewed by police (one of them, a schizophrenic resident of a caravan park near the shopping centre, 18-year-old Sean Peter McPhedran, who was later found guilty of murdering another 12-year-old schoolgirl, Julie-Ann Lowe, on 16 October 1991). The DNA expert who had testified at the trial, Angela van Daal, also provided a statement that she believed the blood evidence inadequate for a conviction. With Wilson, Crowley published Who Killed Leanne? in 2005, and the investigation was featured on the ABC network series Australian Story in August 2007.

In June 2006, after serving more than 14 years, aged 43, Stafford was released on parole and faced a deportation hearing soon after. In April 2008, he again petitioned for a pardon and the Attorney-General again referred it to the Court of Appeal, making it the first case in which the court was to hear a third appeal. On 24 December 2009, the Queensland Court of Appeal overturned his conviction and recommended that a new trial be held. In separate decisions, justices Patrick Keane, Catherine Holmes and Hugh Fraser held that Stafford had been denied a fair trial. Keane and Fraser ordered a retrial but Holmes dissented on the basis Stafford should have been acquitted. On 26 March 2010, the Director of Public Prosecutions decided that a retrial would not be in the public interest.

A subsequent two-year-long police review of the case was completed in November 2012, but has not been made public, although Channel 7's Murder Uncovered did unofficially obtain a copy, parts of which were briefly shown to Stafford and his lawyers in March 2017. In September 2019, an ongoing request by Stafford for access to the report was challenged by Queensland police.

== See also ==
- Andrew Mallard
- List of miscarriage of justice cases
- List of solved missing person cases
