= Tim Carmody =

Australian judge (born 1956)

The Honourable Tim Carmody AM KC

18th Chief Justice of Queensland
- In office 8 July 2014 – 1 July 2015
- Nominated by: Campbell Newman
- Appointed by: Penelope Wensley representing Queen Elizabeth II
- Governor: Penelope Wensley (2008–2014); Paul de Jersey (2014–2021)
- Preceded by: Paul de Jersey
- Succeeded by: Catherine Holmes

31st Chief Magistrate of Queensland (concurrently sworn in as a Judge of the District Court of Queensland)
- In office 16 September 2013 – 1 July 2014
- Nominated by: Campbell Newman
- Appointed by: Penelope Wensley representing Queen Elizabeth II
- Governor: Penelope Wensley (2008–2014)
- Preceded by: Brendan Butler
- Succeeded by: Orazio (Ray) Rinaudo

Personal details
- Born: Timothy Francis Carmody; 18 May 1956 (age 70) Millmerran, Queensland, Australia
- Spouse: Robyn (1977–present)
- Education: Queensland University of Technology

Timothy Francis Carmody AM KC (born 18 May 1956) is an Australian judge who was the Chief Justice of Queensland between 8 July 2014 and 1 July 2015. His previous roles include work as a police officer, barrister, Queensland Crime Commissioner, Family Court of Australia judge, and Chief Magistrate of the Magistrates Court of Queensland. He also presided over the 2013 Child Protection Commission of Inquiry.

As Chief Magistrate, Carmody drew media attention for his comments and actions which were perceived as supportive of the Queensland government of Campbell Newman and their policies, including their laws against outlaw motorcycle gangs, for which he faced criticism from other senior lawyers and judges. His comments and actions were described in media reports as undermining the judiciary's independence from the government, particularly his move to effectively prevent other magistrates from hearing contested bail applications. Media also reported his lone expression of support as a judge for Attorney-General Jarrod Bleijie, who had faced calls to resign after revealing the content of confidential discussions held with the President of the Court of Appeal.

Carmody's subsequent appointment to Chief Justice after nine months as Chief Magistrate, was criticised by legal opinion, with criticism from several current and former judges and senior lawyers focusing on his perceived closeness to Campbell Newman’s LNP government, relative inexperience and lack of support from the legal profession and other judges for his promotion.

Carmody was sworn in Chief Justice on 8 July 2014, following the elevation of his predecessor in the role, Paul de Jersey, to Governor of Queensland. Following ongoing tensions with other members of the judiciary, he resigned as Chief Justice on 1 July 2015. He remained a Judge of the Supreme Court, sitting as a supplemental member of the Queensland Civil and Administrative Tribunal before resigning his commission as a judge altogether with effect from 10 September 2019.

== Early life and career ==
Tim Carmody was born in 1956 in Millmerran on the Darling Downs, the second of four children. His father worked in a variety of roles, including as a seasonal meat worker, publican, bookmaker and boarding house contractor at the meatworks in Katherine, Northern Territory. In 1963, the family moved to a Queensland Housing Commission home in Inala on the outskirts of Brisbane. His mother suffered a malignant brain tumour, which paralysed her and led to her death at the age of 38. Carmody went to a boarding school and later to Nudgee College in Brisbane, from which he dropped out in Year 10 to work as a meat worker, but later rejoined to complete his Year 12 studies. He enrolled at the University of Queensland in a Bachelor of Laws degree, but dropped out after a semester.

Carmody joined the Police Force in 1975, where he was stationed in Brisbane City and West End as well as serving as head of Security at Government House. He resumed his study of law at the Queensland University of Technology in 1976, while working in a police office. Carmody married his wife Robyn in 1977. He later worked as a clerk in the Public Defender's Office, which is now part of Legal Aid Queensland, while he completed his part-time Law studies.

In 1982, Carmody was called to the bar. As a barrister, his roles included Counsel assisting the Fitzgerald Inquiry between 1987 and 1989, one of the junior counsel employed by D P Drummond QC, the Special prosecutor for conducting subsequent prosecutions arising out of that Inquiry between 1989 and 1991, and Junior counsel in the Connolly-Ryan Inquiry into the Criminal Justice Commission between 1996 and 1997. In 1998, Carmody was appointed as Queensland Crime Commissioner. In 1999 he took silk, becoming a Senior Counsel.

Carmody was appointed as a Judge of the Family Court in 2003. In 2006, one of his judgments was overturned by an appeals court after it found that he had "cut and pasted" paragraphs from an earlier judgment with different facts. He resigned from the Family Court in 2008 and returned to private practice, citing the "failure" of the new shared parental responsibility family law regime as a factor in his decision.

Carmody presided over the Queensland Child Protection Commission of Inquiry and handed down his final report on 1 July 2013. Among other findings, he concluded that it had been unlawful for the Cabinet of Wayne Goss to shred evidence gathered by the 1989 investigation of retired magistrate Noel Heiner into the management of the John Oxley Youth Detention Centre. His 121 recommendations included considering putting "toddlers in severely dysfunctional families" up for adoption and re-establishing "institutions for troubled teens". His recommendation that families receive more support to prevent children from ending up in state care was welcomed by child safety groups.

== Chief Magistrate ==
Carmody was appointed concurrently as Queensland's fourth Chief Magistrate and a judge of the District Court of Queensland on 16 September 2013, taking over from Brendan Butler who moved to full-time duties as a judge of the District Court. He was sworn in on 18 September 2013.

=== Juvenile criminal justice proposals ===
In his capacity as Chief Magistrate, Carmody wrote to Attorney-General Bleijie recommending changes to the laws applying to child offenders, which were later the subject of controversy. He recommended that children lose the right to appeal against the sentence handed down by a magistrate, unless there was an error of law. He justified this on the basis that this would save time for the Children's Court of Queensland. This was criticised by the President of the Children's Court, Michael Shanahan. Shanahan noted that the changes would barely lighten the Court's workload, while leading to a slower and more cumbersome appeal process that could deprive children who were inappropriately sentenced of a remedy when time was of the essence. Shanahan also noted that Carmody had failed to consult him before making the recommendation.

=== Anti-outlaw motorcycle gang legislation ===
Carmody's approach to the Newman Government's anti-outlaw motorcycle gang laws also drew media attention. While the laws had faced criticism from several senior lawyers and civil libertarians as well as a serving Supreme Court judge, Carmody was described in the media as a supporter and "cheerleader" of the legislation and the Newman Government's "law-and-order" agenda more broadly. In a decision refusing bail to two alleged associates of an outlaw motorcycle gang, he stated that "the government’s tough stance ... is intended to keep the peace and tackle crime by making Queensland a hostile environment for socially destructive drug traffickers" and "there is, it seems, a new sheriff in town with low or zero tolerance for criminals and their activities". He also sent a three-page email to the magistrates of Queensland, which was strongly supported by Attorney-General Bleijie, suggesting that outlaw motorcycle gang associates (colloquially known as "bikies") should not be granted bail due to the inherent risks of doing so.

The laws imposed a blanket prohibition on judges and magistrates from granting bail to outlaw motorcycle gang members, and were reported as a source of tension between the Government and the judiciary. Several people charged under the new laws had in fact been granted bail by magistrates who ruled that prosecutors had not proven that they were members of such gangs.

In, Carmody DCJ, sitting as a magistrate, construed the newly inserted s 16(3A) of the Bail Act 1980 (Qld). Section 16(3A) of the Bail Act 1980 (Qld) created a so-called “reverse onus” which required some applicants for bail to show cause why bail should be granted.

As enacted on 17 October 2013, s 16(3A) of the Bail Act 1980 (Qld) applied to someone who “is a member of a criminal organisation”.

As Carmody DCJ accepted in Spence at [28], the provision was intended to operate prospectively. The application for bail in Spence v Queensland Police Service was heard on 24 October 2013. At that time, the accused was not a member of a criminal organisation, having resigned from the Hell's Angels on 8 October 2013: Spence v Queensland Police Service at [34]. Notwithstanding this finding, Carmody DCJ held that “the intended scope of section 16(3A) is wide enough, in my opinion, to include the applicant, even if the drafting language used is slightly inapt. Accepting the contrary proposition would produce absurd, unintended results and make section 16(3A) slightly jobless”.

As Wilson J pointed out on appeal in, this decision was wrong. On its clear grammatical meaning, s 16(3A) of the Bail Act 1980 (Qld) referred to a person who “is presently a participant in a criminal organisation, that is, someone who is a participant at the time of the application”. On 8 November 2013 her Honour ruled that s 16(3A) of the Act did not refer to any of the three applicants for bail.

On 27 November 2013 s 7 of the Criminal Law (Criminal Organisations Disruption) and Other Legislation Amendment Act 2013 amended s 16(3A) of the Bail Act 1980 (Qld) so that it read “is, or has at any time been, a member ...”.

On 5 November 2013, Carmody issued a Practice Direction which required that all future contested bail applications be heard in a specified Brisbane Magistrates courtroom in the afternoons, with no more than two listed each day. He stated that this was intended to speed up the process, reduce costs for the Office of the Director of Public Prosecutions and ensure "security for all". The practical effect was that Carmody himself was likely to preside over the controversial bail applications. The move was described in the Courier Mail and ABC News as a decision that stripped other magistrates of their ability to hear the bail applications and suggested the Chief Magistrate lacked confidence in their ability to hear them in a consistent and efficient manner. It was criticised by the Bar Association of Queensland and the Australian Lawyers Alliance, with criminal lawyer Bill Potts warning that the courts and Chief Magistrate would be perceived as politicised, undermining the legal system.

=== Comments relating to the Queensland government and Attorney-General ===
In a January 2014 swearing in of new magistrates, delivered during media attention focused on criticism by other judges of the Government's new laws, Carmody criticised judges who sought to "deliberately frustrate or defeat the policy goals of what they might personally regard as unfair but nonetheless regular laws under cover of office as a form of redress or amelioration", noting that the separation of powers was a "two way street" and that Parliament was supreme. He also stated the judges should not use the "weight of their office to engage in the public debate or to make comments about the comparative morality or fairness" of statutes. The Australian described senior judges and lawyers as being "dismayed" by this speech. In response, the president of the Judicial Conference of Australia, Queensland Supreme Court judge Phillip McMurdo, noted judicial comments were appropriate in certain circumstances, such as laws going to "the heart of the functioning of the judicial branch of the state".

As the media reported rising tensions between the Newman Government and judiciary during March 2014, Carmody broke ranks with other judges, declaring his support for Attorney-General Jarrod Bleijie. Bleijie was facing criticism for revealing details of a private conversation with President of the Queensland Court of Appeal Margaret McMurdo, after she had suggested that the Government was sexist in its judicial appointments. He was the only judge who issued a statement in support of Bleijie, with his statement addressing his position "as head of jurisdiction" and confidence in continuing to meet with Bleijie in that capacity.

== Appointment as Chief Justice ==
=== Speculation ===
Before the June 2014 announcement, Carmody was tipped as one of the people most likely to replace de Jersey as Chief Justice. The speculation led the barrister who had served as Solicitor-General of Queensland until March 2014, Walter Sofronoff QC, to call on Carmody to rule himself out of contention. Sofronoff highlighted Carmody's inexperience and his overt support for the Newman Government's controversial anti-motorcycle gang laws.

The President of the Bar Association, Peter Davis QC, supported Sofronoff's remarks, but noted that Carmody deserved the community's respect as a sitting judge.

The head of the 1989 Fitzgerald Inquiry into corruption in Queensland, Tony Fitzgerald, urged Carmody "not allow his ambition to subvert his personal integrity".

=== Announcement and reactions ===
On 12 June 2014, Carmody was announced as the next Chief Justice of Queensland by Campbell Newman, the Premier of Queensland.

The appointment was welcomed by the Queensland Police Union, which noted Carmody's "deep, accurate and genuine understanding of community expectations and public sentiment" and that he would be the first Chief Justice who was a former police officer.

The Queensland Law Society initially welcomed the appointment, stating Carmody "has served the profession with great distinction and would be a fine leader of the Queensland judiciary and the legal profession." However, in the aftermath of the resignation and concerns expressed by President of the Bar Association of Queensland, Peter Davis QC, the Society expressed its own concerns about the process.

Carmody's appointment was criticised by the head of the Fitzgerald Inquiry, Tony Fitzgerald; Queensland's former solicitor general, Walter Sofronoff QC; and retired Supreme Court judges Richard Chesterman QC and George Fryberg. Criticism centred on perceptions that his perceived closeness to the Newman Government undermined his independence, he lacked the support of his peers in the profession and he did not have the necessary judicial experience to be Chief Justice.

The Australian noted that this would be the first time in history that a magistrate had been promoted directly to Chief Justice of any Australian state. It also stated that he was "the first judge in Australian history to have been elevated so fast to the most senior judicial post in a state".

The announcement of Carmody as Chief Justice came after he had served in the role of Chief Magistrate for nine months. The Queensland Council for Civil Liberties described the appointment as "a throwback to the corrupt era of Sir Joh Bjelke-Petersen", recalling when Terry Lewis was appointed police commissioner over better-qualified senior police.

The then-President of the Bar Association of Queensland, Peter Davis QC, resigned in protest over the appointment process. Davis stated that private conversations he had held with Bleijie and Bleijie's staffer had been leaked and distorted, while noting that "there was little, if any, support for the appointment within the legal profession and little, or none, within the ranks of sitting Supreme Court judges." He also stated that a barrister who had formerly served as Bleijie's Chief of Staff, Ryan Haddrick, had told a member of the Bar Association Committee that the Bar Association's power to issue practising certificates could be revoked and that it should support the appointment.

The Australian Bar Association warned that the independence of the Queensland judiciary was "under threat". The Association subsequently clarified that its concerns related to appointment process and not the appointment itself. The Queensland Law Society, which had initially "warmly welcomed" the appointment, stated that a tainted appointment process risked undermining "the confidence of the profession and the community in individual appointments which then flows on to the larger institution of the courts".

=== Carmody's response ===
Carmody responded in a 4BC radio interview by stating that he was surprised and hurt by the allegation he was "one of the stoolies... appointed by a corrupt government to undermine the court system," describing it "hurtful and... scare-mongering at its worst." He added that he was hurt that neither the Bar Association nor any current Supreme Court judge had offered him their support. He denied any bias in favour of the Newman LNP Government, stating that he was "fiercely independent". He also stated that while he may not be the "smartest lawyer in the room", there was more to being a Chief Justice than being a black letter lawyer, and he did not intend to compete with other Supreme Court judges for "intellectual rigour".

Carmody expressed an intention to emulate his predecessor in the role, Paul de Jersey. He proposed greater access to the courts, such as live streaming of court proceedings to the public, and aligning courtroom decisions more closely to reasonable community expectations as key priorities.

Regarding his relationship with current Supreme Court judges he stated, "I wish I didn’t have to go and see [current judge] Justice Byrne and say ‘Hi, I’m your chief justice. Are we friend or foe?’ But I will and I’ll do that because that's what leaders do". After beginning to schedule "friend or foe" interviews with all Supreme Court judges, Carmody took three weeks' leave. The scheduled interviews were subsequently cancelled.

=== Subsequent reactions ===
While conceding his own personal dislike of Carmody, barrister Tony Morris QC described much of the criticism against Carmody as being "sour grapes" and that Carmody would be capable of undertaking the role.

In a speech given at the North Queensland Bar Association's Bi-Annual Court of Appeal Dinner on 18 June 2014, one of the sitting senior judges on the Queensland Court of Appeal, Justice John Muir, called on Carmody to withdraw from his promotion to Chief Justice due to the lack of support from other Supreme Court judges.

Muir described Carmody's radio broadcasts as an "unseemly spectacle". He added that Carmody should not have defended his own appointment but left it to Premier Newman and Attorney-General Bleijie, stating that "It was not open to the appointee...if he wished to behave as a Chief Justice should behave and demonstrate independence, to effectively support the executive’s actions by publicly talking up his credentials", and that "ironically, the Chief Magistrate, when asserting his independence, was engaged in conduct that called it into question". Muir also criticised Carmody's admission that he lacked the intellectual rigour of the other Supreme Court judges, noting that it would be expected of the leader of the Supreme Court by those coming before it. He added that the appointment of Carmody would "weaken public confidence in the administration of justice and impact adversely on the willingness of parties, who have the freedom of choice in the matter, to litigate in Queensland state courts".

Muir's fellow serving Supreme Court judge Justice Martin Daubney subsequently told the Courier Mail that he spoke privately to Carmody "with the unanimous authorisation of all of the judges of the Court of Appeal and the Trial Division of the Supreme Court". The newspaper speculated that Carmody was urged to refuse the appointment to Chief Justice and that a compromise was suggested, whereby Carmody would take a lesser promotion such as judge of the Supreme Court.

Carmody was defended by the former Chief Justice of the Family Court with whom he had served, Alastair Nicholson. Describing Carmody as deep-thinking, reliable, innovative and sensible, Nicholson labelled the criticism of Carmody "unfair and unreasonable". Nicholson added that Justice Muir should not have made those comments, which he considered "damaging and unnecessary". Retired District Court judge Brian Boulton criticised Carmody's detractors, emphasising that judicial appointments were a matter for the executive and that Carmody had experience in other areas to his predecessor. The outgoing Chief Justice of Queensland, Paul de Jersey, released a press statement in which he urged the judiciary to accept the government's choice of his successor and move on.

Journalist Madonna King subsequently revealed that the favourite to succeed de Jersey as Chief Justice had been David Jackson, a current judge of the Supreme Court, with Premier Campbell Newman insisting on the appointment of Carmody after Sofronoff publicly questioned Carmody's credentials. Other shortlisted candidates included other sitting Supreme Court judges, such as Court of Appeal judge Hugh Fraser and Senior Judge Administrator John Byrne. LNP backbenchers were described as unhappy with the appointment and resulting furore. Newman defended the nomination, saying that judges should "get on with the job".

== Chief Justice ==
Carmody was sworn in as Chief Justice in a private ceremony on 8 July 2014, the first time a Chief Justice's swearing in had occurred this way in almost a century.

A public welcoming ceremony was held on 1 August 2014, to coincide with the swearing in of Peter Flanagan as a Supreme Court judge. Although this was described by The Australian as an attempt to avoid a boycott by sitting Supreme Court judges out of respect for Flanagan, the boycott proceeded with no judges apart from Carmody and Flanagan in attendance. A former Queensland Director of Public Prosecutions has publicly stated that this conduct constituted a prima facie criminal offence, though there is little prospect of a conviction. The newly appointed head of the Bar Association of Queensland, Shane Doyle QC, stated that the controversy over the appointment was "in the past" and that Carmody would have the Association's support.

At his welcoming speech, Carmody noted the absence of the other judges and apologised to his wife and family for the distress caused by his appointment. He noted that he had learned a valuable life lesson - "to be truly free you have to forget what other people think or say about you."

An analysis of Carmody's first six months in office showed that he had delivered three published judgments, compared to the twenty delivered in the final six months of his predecessor Paul de Jersey. A Guardian Australia analysis of the 2015 February judges' sitting calendar showed that Carmody was the least active Supreme Court judge, scheduled to hear cases for 12 weeks between February and July 2015, with seven weeks on his own; other judges except Senior Judge Administrator were to hear at least 15 weeks in that time, with 12 on their own. Carmody subsequently removed his schedule from this calendar, and instead commenced a separate "Chief Justice's Engagements" calendar.

Two of Carmody's unpublished decisions were overturned by the Court of Appeal, including a case where he refused bail to a mother of eight children who faced drugs charges. The Court ruled that Carmody had “inadvertently overlooked” compelling reasons why the woman should not be in jail, which “would result in significant or exceptional hardship to her eight young children”. Another case involving a business dispute led Justice Muir to conclude that the Chief Justice had denied natural justice and erred in law by failing to give adequate reasons for his decision.

In his first annual report as Chief Justice, Carmody criticised the quality of transcripts which the Government had outsourced to the private sector, noting that the quality was poor and judges often had to rely on audio recordings.

=== Valedictory remarks of Justice Wilson ===
At a ceremony to mark his retirement on 26 March 2015, Justice Alan Wilson made a speech criticising Carmody's performance as Chief Justice, stating that he had "lost all respect" from most of the Supreme Court judges. Wilson made a series of allegations about the Chief Justice. He stated that Carmody's public calls for civility and courtesy in the legal profession were hypocritical given that he privately referred to his judicial colleagues as “snakes” and “scum”.

Wilson alleged that Carmody had sought to remove Justice John Byrne from his role as Senior Judge Administrator, a move that he reversed after "universal condemnation" from other Supreme Court judges. He further alleged that Carmody had sought to interfere with the protocol for choosing the judge who would sit on the Court of Disputed Returns. That judge could potentially have decided whether a new vote would need to be held for the electoral district of Ferny Grove in the wake of a candidate being found ineligible to stand for election. This could have potentially changed the outcome of the close 2015 Queensland state election, which the LNP ultimately lost.

Wilson also stated that Carmody had failed to hear any cases in recent weeks, preferring instead to undertake a public relations role which resulted in the other Supreme Court judges having to bear a heavier workload. According to Wilson, the Chief Justice stated that he would occasionally sit on the Court of Appeal but would otherwise not sit on first instance matters in Brisbane.

After Wilson's ceremony, sitting judge Roslyn Atkinson stated in open court in a case before her that everything that Wilson had said was true and that she was "extremely grateful" to him for his remarks.

Carmody, who had been overseas during Wilson's speech, subsequently wrote an open letter to the Bar Association of Queensland and the Queensland Law Society. In it, he described Wilson's remarks as "graceless" and defended his integrity. Carmody responded to the allegation of interference with the Court of Disputed Returns protocol by stating he believed that under the legislation he was impliedly required to exercise his independent judgment and that he had taken advice from other Chief Justices in doing so. Regarding the allegations about his work ethic, Carmody responded that he was not going to be a "George Street judge" and would appear across the regions of Queensland. While accepting that he could do more to foster a culture of mutual respect and professionalism, he reiterated that we would not be bullied out of judicial office and requested that the destabilisation end.

=== Cowan appeal and dispute with President McMurdo ===
Together with President McMurdo and Justice Hugh Fraser of the Court of Appeal, Carmody sat on the appeal by Brett Peter Cowan against his conviction for the murder of Daniel Morcombe. After the appeal hearing and before the appeal decision had been handed down, Carmody met with Hetty Johnston, the founder and executive director of the children protection advocacy group Bravehearts. When she learned of this, President McMurdo emailed Carmody to note that she was "deeply concerned" and that he should disclose the meeting to Cowan's defence lawyers.

Carmody's response by email stated:

Any suggestion that this would be sufficient to give rise to a reasonable apprehension of bias or prejudice ... is unsupported by precedent and utterly preposterous. I find it disturbing that a scheduled meeting disseminated in the public domain through the Chief Justice's calendar, between the head of the jurisdiction and an arm's length non-party community leader, will cause you 'deep concern' regarding my independence or impartiality. It is even more alarming that your associate decided to investigate, on your instruction or otherwise, any comments made by Ms Johnston regarding Cowan.

— Chief Justice Tim Carmody, Email to President Margaret McMurdo dated 22 April 2015

McMurdo responded the next day, stating that she rejected all of Carmody's "ill conceived allegations of impropriety".

After Cowan's lawyers applied for Carmody to recuse himself from the case given apprehended bias following his meeting with Johnston, Carmody withdrew from hearing the appeal on 7 May 2015. The Chief Justice stated that although he believed the application had no merit and the allegations of bias, he was acting "in the best interests of this court and overall public confidence in the administration of justice" The Chief Justice also labelled the allegation of bias as "absurd and extraordinary". The application to have Chief Justice Carmody withdraw was heavily criticised by Daniel Morcombe's parents and also by Bravehearts.

Upon the release of his 'Mention Remarks', the Chief Justice also published emails between himself and the President of the Court of Appeal, Justice Margaret McMurdo. These emails revealed continuing disagreement between the Chief Justice and other members of the Court of Appeal, with President McMurdo informing the Executive Director of the Supreme and District Courts Service that she did not wish to sit on any future cases with Chief Justice Carmody. The released emails also reveal that Carmody had failed to read the draft judgments circulated months earlier by President McMurdo and Justice Fraser. Queensland Premier Annastacia Palaszczuk called for the disagreements within the judiciary to end.

=== Secret recording by Justice Byrne ===
In May 2015 reports emerged that Carmody had been secretly recorded by John Byrne, the Senior Judge Administrator when they met along with Justice David Boddice. The meeting related to who would sit on the Court of Disputed Returns if the result for the electoral district of Ferny Grove was challenged, and involved hostility and explicit language. Carmody was recorded as referring to the other Supreme Court judges as "scum". Carmody stated he had no intention of resigning and would continue to perform his role as Chief Justice.

=== Resignation as Chief Justice ===
Carmody took one month's sick leave on 14 May 2015 to seek back treatment. While on leave he offered to resign on 25 May 2015 on "just terms" and on the condition that the State Government agreed to a court reform agenda, such as implementing a judicial commission. His offer was welcomed by Attorney-General Yvette D'Ath as putting the judiciary before himself. Carmody was due to subsequently outline his vision for court reform at a Hamilton Island legal conference but withdrew due to his wife's illness. In June 2015 he acted as Governor of Queensland despite being on sick leave from his normal role as Chief Justice.

Carmody resigned as Chief Justice on 1 July 2015 but remained a Judge of the Supreme Court, sitting as a supplemental judicial member of the Queensland Civil and Administrative Tribunal. He was replaced as Chief Justice by Catherine Holmes, who praised his grace in stepping down and promised that she would offer him "whatever help I can give".

== Later career ==
Carmody continued as Supreme Court judge and supplementary QCAT member until he resigned from the bench with effect from 10 September 2019. His resignation was announced by Attorney-General Yvette d'Ath on 17 July 2018.

== Honours ==
Centenary Medal
Member of the Order of Australia in the 2022 Queen's Birthday Honours for "significant service to the law, and to the judiciary"

Legal offices
Preceded by Brendan Butler	Chief Magistrate, Magistrates Court of Queensland; 2013-2014	Succeeded by Orazio Rinaudo
Preceded by Paul de Jersey	Chief Justice of Queensland; 2014–2015	Succeeded by Catherine Holmes
