= Clayton Utz =

Australian law firm

- Headquarters: 1 Bligh Street; Sydney, Australia
- No. of offices: 6
- No. of employees: 1,600+
- Major practice areas: Full service commercial law
- Revenue: ▲AUD$594 million (2024)
- Profit per equity partner: AUD$1.5 million (2011/12)
- Date founded: 1833; 193 years ago
- Founder: Bob Nichols
- Company type: Partnership
- Website: claytonutz.com

Clayton Utz is an Australian law firm with offices in Sydney, Melbourne, Brisbane, Perth, Canberra and Darwin. Established in 1833, it is a large-sized firm, known as one of the big six Australian law firms. The firm is recognised for its litigation practice, government clients, pro bono services and high-profile alumni. In 2024, the firm had an annual revenue of $594 million. As of 2021 it had 179 partners and 1,600 personnel in six offices.

== Operations ==
=== Legal services ===
Clayton Utz is a full-service law firm and provides legal services in a wide variety of practice areas. The primary focus of the firm is commercial law, although it has broad competence in a large number of practice areas.

The firm manages the affairs of clients across jurisdictions, and retains dual-qualified lawyers. It is a member of international legal networks such as Lex Mundi and the Pacific Rim Advisory Council.

=== Notable legal work ===
The firm has undertaken several high-profile matters including Toll Group's takeover of Patrick Corporation, Mayne Group's de-merger, and Tatts Group's $2.17 billion IPO and listing. The firm's corporate team has acted for AMP on its $14 billion acquisition of Axa Pacific Holdings and represented the Singapore Exchange on its proposed merger with ASX.

Notable clients of the firm include Commonwealth Bank, Noble Group, Barrick Gold and Fortescue.

=== Pro bono work ===
The firm provides pro bono legal services supporting charities, non-profits, and vulnerable clients. The firm claims to average over 50 hours of pro bono work per lawyer at the firm. It employs two partners to run its pro bono practice, which was established in 1997. Although the firm is required to undertake a certain amount of pro-bono work to be eligible for government tenders, it is likely that it exceeds those requirements.

=== Social responsibility ===
In March 2010, the firm launched an action plan to reconcile with Indigenous Australians. The firm fully offsets its carbon emissions.

== Controversies ==
=== McCabe v British American Tobacco ===
It has been alleged that the firm arranged for its clients to destroy legally damaging documents. These allegations arose out of a litigation brought by a smoker Rolah McCabe, against British American Tobacco in 2002. The presiding judge for the trial found that Clayton Utz had enabled BAT to engage in a document retention policy which destroyed documents implicating the company. On appeal it was found that the firm's conduct was not unlawful. In reaction to the decision, Victorian laws about document retention were strengthened by Parliament.

In 2006 it was revealed that an internal investigation by Clayton Utz had implicated its partner; finding he had engaged in professional misconduct. That partner, Glenn Eggleton, was found to have given 'potentially perjurious' evidence, and to have taken advantage of McCabe's limited life expectancy while conducting the litigation. Eggleton denied these allegations.

In the aftermath of the McCabe litigation Clayton Utz closed its tobacco claims practice.

=== Sexual harassment allegations ===
In 2011 Clayton Utz was sued in negligence for having failed to prevent sexual harassment at the firm. Emails had been circulated among graduate lawyers in the firm about another female graduate lawyer. Clayton Utz was found not liable, as the court did not find that its partners ought reasonably to have prevented the correspondence. The lawyer subject to the lawsuit resigned shortly after settlement of the suit.

== Alumni ==
Notable alumni of the firm include:

- Hector Clayton, Leader of the New South Wales Opposition in the Legislative Council.
- John Howard, 25th prime minister of Australia, from 1996-2007.
- Julie Bishop MP, 38th Minister of Foreign Affairs.
- Christian Porter MP, 37th Attorney-General for Australia, former treasurer and Attorney-General of Western Australia.
- Brigitte Markovic, Judge, Federal Court of Australia.
- Anthony Fisher, 9th Catholic Archbishop of Sydney.
- Sir Anthony Frank Mason, 9th chief justice of Australia.
- Michael Andrew Wigney, Judge, Federal Court of Australia.
- Michelle Gordon, Judge, High Court of Australia.
- Frances Williams, Judge, Supreme Court of Queensland.
- Doug Jones, arbitrator and judge, Singapore International Commercial Court.
- Terence Cole, KC, Jurist and Australian Government Royal Commissioner.
- Hugh Fraser, Judge, Supreme Court of Queensland.
- Joe Catanzariti, Vice President of the Fair Work Commission.
- Shan Tennent, first woman to be appointed to the Supreme Court of Tasmania.
- James Halliday, wine critic and vigneron.
- Anthe Philippides, Judge, Supreme Court of Queensland.
- Kerry Shine, Queensland Attorney-General and founder of Shine Lawyers.
- Martin Daubney, chancellor, Australian Catholic University.
- Paul Tottle, Judge, Supreme Court of Western Australia.
- Yaseen Shariff, Judge, Federal Court of Australia.
- Scott Goodman, Judge, Federal Court of Australia.
- John Snaden, Judge, Federal Court of Australia.

== Awards ==
Awards and recognition include:

- Australian Law Firm of the Year, Chambers Asia-Pacific Awards (2018)
- Attorney-General's Pro Bono Service Award, ACT Law Society Awards (2018)
- Pro Bono Law Firm of the Year, Who's Who Legal (2019, 2020)
- Most Innovative National Firm of the Year, International Financial Law Review (IFLR) Asia-Pacific Awards (2019, 2020)
- Winner - Marsh Excellence in Employee Health and Wellbeing Award, Australasian Law Awards (2020)
- Corporate Citizen Firm of the Year, Australasian Lawyer (2021)
- Australian Law Firm of the Year, The Lawyers Global (2022)

== See also ==
- List of oldest companies in Australia
