= Nathan Jarro =

Indigenous Australian judge (born 1977)

The Honourable Nathan Jarro

Personal details
- Education: Queensland University of Technology
- Occupation: Judge

The Honourable Nathan Jarro (born 1977) is a judge of the Queensland District Court and Queensland's first Indigenous judge. He is Ghangalu on his father's side and Bidjara on his mother's side.

== Early life and education ==
Jarro attended high school at Marist College Ashgrove, graduating in 1994. He went on to study Bachelor of Laws and Bachelor of Business (Accountancy) at Queensland University of Technology (QUT), graduating in 2000. QUT named Jarro their Alumnus of the Year and inaugural Indigenous Alumnus of the Year in 2020.

== Career ==
Jarro began his legal career as a solicitor for two years, and was called to the bar in 2004. He worked as an associate to Supreme Court Justice Martin Moynihan. Jarro's practice at the bar was diverse and included criminal, commercial, personal injury, and property law. He served as deputy public interest monitor starting in 2011.

Jarro was appointed a judge of the District Court of Queensland on 26 March 2018.

Jarro has served as a member of various tribunals, including the Children Services Tribunal, the Mental Health Review Tribunal and the Queensland Civil and Administrative Tribunal.

== Personal life ==
Jarro's wife Alison, a lawyer, is the daughter of Paul de Jersey, former governor of Queensland.
