= John Byrne (judge) =

Former Judge of the Supreme Court of Queensland

Lieutenant Colonel the Honourable John Harris Byrne AO RFD KC

Judge of the Supreme Court of Queensland
- In office 25 July 1989 – August 2017

Personal details
- Born: 16 October 1948 (age 78)

Military service
- Allegiance: Australia
- Branch/service: Australian Army Reserve
- Years of service: 1966–1985
- Rank: Lieutenant Colonel
- Unit: Queensland University Regiment
- Commands: Officer Cadet Training Unit (Wacol)
- Awards: Officer of the Order of Australia; Reserve Force Decoration

John Harris Byrne AO RFD KC (born 16 October 1948) is a retired Australian jurist who previously served as Senior Judge Administrator of the Supreme Court of Queensland. Having been a judge of that court since 1989, he was one of the court's most experienced judges. He was also Chair of the National Judicial College of Australia, a body which provides programs and professional development resources to judicial officers in Australia. He is now a private commercial arbitrator.

== Pre-judicial career ==
Byrne commenced his legal career as an articled clerk for Morris Fletcher and Cross before being admitted as a barrister of the Supreme Court of Queensland in 1972. He was appointed King's Counsel in 1982. He also became a member of the Supreme Court Library Committee, Supreme Court Rules Committee and the University of Queensland Law Faculty Board. He also served in the Army Reserve, in the Infantry Corps, from 1966 to 1985.

== Judicial career ==
Byrne was involved in many notable cases during his long judicial career.

=== Legal Services Commissioner v Mullins ===
The Legal Services Commissioner contended that the legal practitioner acting for a plaintiff in a personal injuries claim had committed professional misconduct by failing to disclose the fact that his client had been diagnosed with cancer and then relying on a report in a mediation which had assumed a normal life expectancy for the client. The claim had settled at the mediation for significantly more than if the insurer had known of the client's cancer condition. The practitioner, a barrister, defended the charge, arguing that continuing to rely on reports without disclosing the client's condition was not tantamount to some representation that he was not aware of facts that could deleteriously impact on his longevity, and the common assumption was that the parties would rely exclusively on their own resources and information.

Justice Byrne held that the practitioner had intentionally deceived the insurer and its barrister concerning the client's life expectancy and this involved such a substantial departure from the standard of conduct to be expected of legal practitioners of good repute and competency as to constitute professional misconduct. The practitioner was publicly reprimanded, fined $20,000 and ordered to pay the Commissioner's costs.

=== Gilfoyle v Conde ===
In this case, Julie Gilfoyle, Burchill & Horsey Lawyers, Mylton Burns and McInnes Wilson Lawyers brought an application under the Vexatious Proceedings Act 2005 against the respondent Milton Arnoldo Conde, who had commenced more than two dozen proceedings in Queensland Courts between May 2009 and February 2010, including against solicitors and barristers acting against those he was suing, an Anti-Discrimination Tribunal member named Peter Roney and even the Chief Justice of Queensland Paul de Jersey.

After considering all the proceedings Mr Conde had brought, Justice Byrne made the following conclusions about Mr Conde's litigations:

- they allege that lawyers who have acted for his opponents maliciously prosecuted him and abused court process;
- they do not state facts that could arguably sustain the conclusory imputations of bad faith and other improper motive advanced;
- they are centred on ordinary steps in litigation taken by lawyers apparently acting properly for clients: such as defending a case, applying to a court for orders, and enforcing a costs order by bankruptcy proceedings;
- they involve extravagant, unparticularised claims for compensation for a broad range of grievances, personal injury and economic loss;
- have no reasonable prospect of success, on the face of the proceedings or on the evidence; and
- do not conform with the Uniform Civil Procedure Rules governing pleadings.

As a result of those conclusions, his Honour granted leave to the applicants to proceed, stayed Conde's six separate proceedings against the applicants, prohibited Conde from starting any fresh proceedings without the leave of the Supreme Court and ordered that Conde pay the applicant's costs on an indemnity basis.

Conde later sought to appeal against Justice Byrne's orders, and also sought to re-commence the proceedings that his Honour had stayed. The Queensland Court of Appeal dismissed all of his appeals, as well as the proceedings that Justice Byrne had stayed. Conde's application for special leave to appeal to the High Court of Australia was refused.

=== The Queen v Patel ===
This 2010 high-profile criminal trial involved three charges of manslaughter and one charge of grievous bodily harm being brought against former Bundaberg Surgeon Dr Jayant Patel.

==== Legal controversy ====
The case became legally controversial after the prosecution sought to amend the legal basis upon Dr Patel was charged on the 43rd day of trial, resulting in heated legal argument between the prosecution and the defence. The prosecution sought to change its manslaughter case to one of unlawful killing based on the surgery having caused the death of the patient in a way not justified or excused by law.

The reason the prosecution sought to amend their case was that for three out of the four charges, the prosecution's contention was that Patel's criminality lay in his negligent decision to perform the operations he did (and subsequently perform the operations), since it could not be proven that the operations themselves had been performed incompetently.

The legal controversies concerned the meaning and legal effect of sections 288 and 282 of the Criminal Code. Section 288 provided that:

It is duty of every person who ... undertakes to administer surgical ... treatment to any other person, or to do any other lawful act which is or may be dangerous to human life or health, to have reasonable skill and to use reasonable care in doing such act, and the person is held to have caused any consequences which result to the life or health of any person by reason of any omission to observe or perform that duty

Meanwhile, section 282 provided a possible defence for the accused:

A person is not criminally responsible for performing... with reasonable care and skill, a surgical operation... for the patient's benefit ... if performing the operation ... is reasonable, having regard to the patient's state at the time and to all the circumstances of the case

Counsel for the accused Michael Byrne QC submitted that the accused was not criminally responsible for the outcomes of surgery performed with the patient's consent, except pursuant to s 288. It was also submitted for the defence that s288 was confined to the act of performing surgery itself, and that no criminal liability could arise from a decision to perform a proposed surgery. If those submissions had been accepted, three of the four charges against Patel would have been doomed to failure, as criminal negligence committed during the relevant surgeries could not be established.

Justice Byrne held that the prosecution could not advance their new case because the fact that the surgery was consented to made it lawful, subject to s288. His Honour also held that section 282 was confined to cases where a surgeon did not have the consent of the person whose benefit the surgery was being performed (for example, where a patient is unconscious and unable to consent before surgery), and did not apply because Patel had obtained the consent of his patients. However, his Honour also found that s288 could extend to the decision to perform a surgery (followed by the performing of the surgery), rather than being confined to the act of performing the surgery itself.

As a result, the trial was allowed to proceed on its original legal footing. Patel was subsequently found guilty by the jury of three charges of unlawful killing and one of grievous bodily harm.

==== Patel's sentence ====
In sentencing, Justice Byrne noted the fact that Patel had consented to an order of the Board of Medical Examiners of the State of Oregon when he practised in that jurisdiction, and that while that order had no legal effect in Australia, it should have made Patel aware that his professional judgment was considered questionable. The fact that Patel had carried on regardless in Queensland was an aggravating factor.

However, his Honour also found many mitigating factors, including the fact that this was Patel's first conviction, that prison would be particularly difficult given his age, notoriety and his family living overseas, and that he had already served time in prison while cooperating with his extradition to Queensland.

As a result, his Honour imposed seven-year sentences for each of the manslaughter charges, and three years for the grievous bodily harm charge. Since the sentences are concurrent, it was in effect a seven-year sentence, less the time Patel had already spent in custody.

==== Appeal to Court of Appeal ====
Patel then appealed his conviction, and both the Attorney-General and Patel appealed the sentence. The Court of Appeal dismissed both appeals, holding that Justice Byrne's interpretation of s288 was correct, and that the sentence imposed was neither too lenient nor manifestly excessive. The Court did however voice its disagreement over Justice Byrne's construction of s282 as only applying when the patient has not consented to the surgery in question.

==== Appeal to High Court ====
Patel then appealed the Court of Appeal's decision to the High Court of Australia, and was granted special leave on the ground of appeal that "The Court of Appeal erred in law in finding that the convictions of the appellant ... could be supported on the basis that the appellant had breached a duty under s 288 of the [Code]. This section did not apply to the offences of which the appellant was convicted".

On 24 August 2012, the High Court unanimously allowed the appeal. Although the High Court concurred with Justice Byrne and the Court of Appeal on the interpretation of s288, the Court held that a large amount of prejudicial evidence had been admitted at trial due to the prosecution changing its contention (described above) and that "The sheer extent of the prejudicial evidence in the context of a wide-ranging prosecution case is likely to have overwhelmed the jury". The Court also wrote that "The prejudicial effect on the jury was not overcome by the directions given by the trial judge about the limited use that could be made of that evidence".

The High Court also ordered a retrial. A retrial only took place in respect of one charge, and Dr Patel was acquitted of that charge.

=== The Queen v Sica ===
In 2012, Justice Byrne presided over the trial of Massimo Sica, charged with having committed a triple murder in Bridgeman Downs in 2003. Before the trial, Sica's defence had applied under s590AA of the Criminal Code to have the evidence of Andrea Bowman of an admission of guilt by Sica excluded. Justice Byrne rejected the arguments that the alleged confession was not voluntarily given and that Sica was too intoxicated for the evidence to be admitted, and dismissed the application.

Sica was subsequently convicted of all three counts of murder. On 5 July 2012, Justice Byrne sentenced Sica to life imprisonment, with a non-parole period of 35 years, the most severe sentence handed down in Queensland history. The sentencing remarks were scathing. Justice Byrne remarked to Sica that "You have no remorse whatsoever. Your only anxiety is for self-preservation". The remarks also described Sica as "manipulative and deceitful", and were critical of the way Sica had involved the personal lives of the family of the victims in the trial.

=== The Queen v Baden-Clay ===
In 2014, Justice Byrne presided over the trial of real estate agent Gerard Baden-Clay, who was charged with the murder of his wife Allison Baden-Clay. Gerard Baden-Clay was found guilty of murder by the jury, and subsequently sentenced to life imprisonment. Justice Byrne's sentencing remarks described Baden-Clay's besmirching of his wife's memory as "thoroughly reprehensible", and noted that Baden-Clay was "definitely not of good character" and he was "given to lies and deception".

On 8 December 2015, his conviction was downgraded to manslaughter by the Queensland Court of Appeal on the ground that the evidence at trial was not able to exclude a reasonable hypothesis that "there was a physical confrontation between [Baden-Clay] and his wife in which he delivered a blow which killed her (for example, by the effects of a fall hitting her head against a hard surface) without intending to cause serious harm".

The following year, the High Court of Australia restored Baden-Clay's original murder conviction, holding that it was open to the jury to be satisfied that Baden-Clay intended to kill his wife given the circumstantial evidence of intent, and Baden-Clay's false testimony that he knew nothing of the circumstances of his wife's death.

== Post-judicial career ==
According to his website, Byrne now works privately in dispute resolution, providing services in commercial arbitration, mediation, case assessment and referee determination.
