= Green v Hatchy Investments pty Ltd =

Green v Hatchy Investments pty Ltd was an important appeals case in Brisbane, Queensland, Australia, which set a precedent for Queensland landlord-tenant law, and clarified the rule around the requirement of conciliation before a plaintiff could begin legal proceedings in court.

== Facts ==
Mr Green was a tenant in a property in Brisbane, Queensland, of which Hatchy was the property manager. The tenancy ended and a dispute arose between Mr Green and Hatchy. Hatchy subsequently filed in the Queensland Civil and Administrative Tribunal for compensation. s.416 of Residential Tenancies and Rooming Accommodation Act required the parties to enter into a conciliation process before legal proceedings could begin. Hatchy failed to do so, and Mr Green made an application to strike out Hatchy's claim. Before this application could be considered, the trial was listed and took place. At trial, the judge purported to carry out conciliation, and subsequently awarded Hatchy $1,285 compensation.

Mr Green appealed. The judgement of Mr Alan Wilson, president of QCAT, was delivered, reversing the trial judge's decision, and striking out Hatchy's claim on the basis of lack of jurisdiction. The judgement confirmed the strict requirements of s. 416 of the act, noting that unless conciliation was carried out, QCAT lacked jurisdiction, and for want of jurisdiction, there was nothing the court could do to cure it.

The judgement has since been cited and the principles it set out approved of in other cases in Queensland landlord-tenant law.
