= Catherine Holmes =

Australian judge (born 1956)

The Honourable Catherine Holmes AC SC

19th Chief Justice of Queensland
- In office 11 September 2015 – 19 March 2022
- Nominated by: Annastacia Palaszczuk
- Governor: Paul de Jersey; Jeannette Young
- Preceded by: Tim Carmody
- Succeeded by: Helen Bowskill

Royal Commissioner into the Robodebt Scheme
- In office 18 August 2022 – 7 July 2023

Personal details
- Born: 12 October 1956 (age 70) Brisbane, Queensland
- Education: Australian National University; Queensland Institute of Technology; University of Queensland

Catherine Ena "Cate" Holmes AC SC (born 12 October 1956) is a retired Australian jurist who served as Chief Justice of the Supreme Court of Queensland, the highest ranking court in the Australian state of Queensland. She was appointed to the Supreme Court of Queensland in 2000, to the Queensland Court of Appeal in 2006 and appointed chief justice on 11 September 2015. She retired on 19 March 2022.

== Education ==
Holmes attended Oxley State High School and Our Lady of the Sacred Heart College, Darra, Queensland. She attended the Australian National University graduating with a Bachelor of Economics in 1977 and then attended the University of Queensland graduating with a Bachelor of Laws in 1980. She completed a Graduate Diploma of Legal Practice at the Queensland Institute of Technology in 1983, a Bachelor of Arts with Honours in 1989 and a Master of Laws (advanced) in 1998 both at the University of Queensland. Holmes was awarded a Doctor of Laws honoris causa from The University of Queensland in 2016.

== Career ==
Holmes was admitted as a solicitor of the Supreme Court of Queensland in 1982. In 1984 she was admitted as a barrister of the Supreme Court of Queensland and was a Foundation Member of the Women's Legal Service in Queensland. She was a Crown Prosecutor in the Office of Commonwealth Director of Public Prosecutions from 1984 to 1986. In 1986 she began a law firm private practice focused on criminal and administrative law. She served as a Member of the Queensland Anti-Discrimination Tribunal from 1994 to 2000.

Holmes was appointed deputy president of the Queensland Community Corrections Board in 1997. From 1998 to 1999 she served as the counsel assisting the Forde Commission of Inquiry into Child Abuse. In 1999 she was appointed senior counsel and was made acting judge on the District Court of Queensland.

On 16 March 2000 Holmes was appointed as a judge on the Supreme Court of Queensland. From 2004 to 2006 she was a judge on the Queensland Mental Health Court. On 26 May 2006 she was appointed to the Queensland Court of Appeals of the Supreme Court of Queensland.

On 18 January 2011, it was announced that Justice Holmes would be appointed to head an inquiry into the 2011 Queensland floods. The following day the Bar Association of Queensland criticised the appointment, suggesting that it would be unconventional for a sitting judge to head an inquiry. However, Paul de Jersey, then chief justice of Queensland, defended the appointment, arguing that it was appropriate because of the apparent absence of any suggestion of political or institutional corruption. Since then, there have been several inquiries led by sitting judges, without giving rise to questions of convention.

On 7 September 2015, Holmes was announced as the new Chief Justice of Queensland, replacing Tim Carmody who resigned on 1 July.

She was sworn in on 11 September 2015, becoming the first female chief justice of the state.

Holmes was appointed a Companion of the Order of Australia in the 2020 Australia Day Honours for "eminent service to the judiciary, notably to criminal, administrative, and mental health law, and to the community of Queensland."

After her retirement on 19 March 2022, Holmes was appointed as the head of the Royal Commission into the Robodebt Scheme on 18 August 2022.

She conducted the Independent review into the Crime and Corruption Commission's reporting on the performance of its corruption functions from 19 February 2024 to 20 May 2024.

== See also ==
- Judiciary of Australia
- List of Judges of the Supreme Court of Queensland
- List of the first women appointed to Australian judicial positions

Legal offices
Preceded by Tim Carmody	Chief Justice of Queensland; 2015–2022	Succeeded by Helen Bowskill
