= Tony Fitzgerald =

Australian judge (born 1941)

The Honourable Tony Fitzgerald AC KC
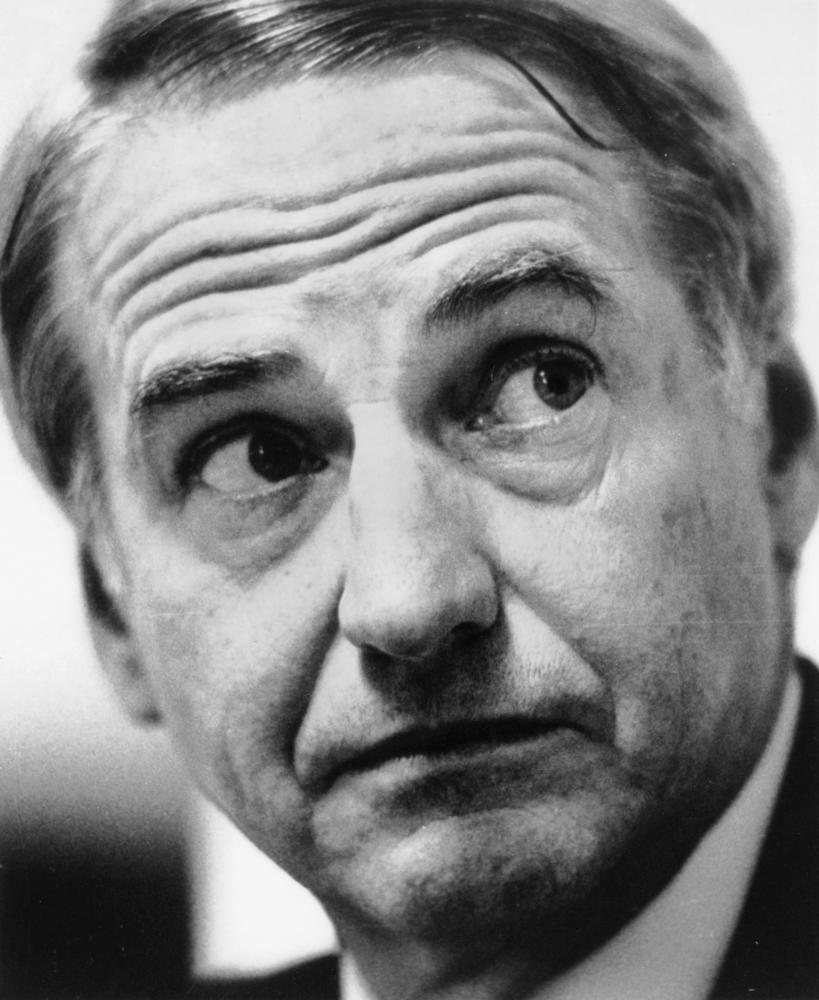
- Fitzgerald in 1990

Judge of the New South Wales Court of Appeal
- In office 1 July 1998 – 16 April 2001

President of the Queensland Court of Appeal
- In office 16 December 1991 – 30 June 1998
- Preceded by: New office
- Succeeded by: Margaret McMurdo

Judge of the Supreme Court of Queensland
- In office 16 December 1991 – 30 June 1998

Chair of the Commission of Inquiry into the Conservation, Management and Use of Fraser Island and the Great Sandy Region
- In office 9 March 1990 – 1 May 1991

Chair of the Commission of Inquiry into Official Corruption in Queensland
- In office 26 May 1987 – 29 June 1989

Judge of the Federal Court of Australia
- In office 25 November 1981 – 30 June 1984

Additional Judge of the Supreme Court of the Australian Capital Territory
- In office 19 November 1981 – 20 June 1984

Member of the Administrative Appeals Tribunal
- In office 1981–1984

Personal details
- Born: Gerald Edward Fitzgerald; 26 November 1941 (age 84) Brisbane, Queensland
- Spouse: Kate Fitzgerald
- Children: 3
- Education: University of Queensland
- Occupation: Judge, lawyer
- Known for: Presiding over the Fitzgerald Inquiry
- Awards: Order of Australia

Gerald Edward "Tony" Fitzgerald AC KC (born 26 November 1941) is an Australian former Australian judge, who presided over the Fitzgerald Inquiry. The report from the inquiry led to the resignation of the Premier of Queensland Joh Bjelke-Petersen, and the jailing of several ministers and a police commissioner. He was the youngest person to be appointed as a judge of the Federal Court of Australia.

== Early life ==
Tony Fitzgerald was born in a cottage in Sandgate, Queensland. He attended high school at St Patrick's College, Shorncliffe and later enrolled at the University of Queensland. Initially, he pursued studies in engineering before switching to law. Fitzgerald graduated in 1964 with an LLB and was admitted to the bar in the same year.

== Career ==
"Unless there is an effective parliamentary opposition to advocate alternative policies, criticise government errors, denounce excesses of power and reflect, inform and influence public opinion, the checks and balances needed for democracy are entirely missing."

In 1975, Fitzgerald became a QC. He was a judge in the Federal Court of Australia from 25 November 1981 to 30 June 1984.

Fitzgerald presided over the Fitzgerald Inquiry into corruption in the Queensland government. He was the chair of the Commission of Inquiry into Official Corruption in Queensland from 1987 to 1989. While undertaking the Fitzgerald Inquiry, he and his family received death threats which were taken seriously by police.

In 1990 and 1991, Fitzgerald also chaired the Commission of Inquiry into the Conservation, Management and Use of Fraser Island and the Great Sandy Region. He was made a Companion of the Order of Australia in 1991.

He was appointed as a judge of the Supreme Court of Queensland, which is the highest ranking court in the State of Queensland. He also served as the first President of the Court of Appeals Division, from 16 December 1991 until his retirement from that court on 30 June 1998. He was a judge on the Court of Appeals Division of the Supreme Court of New South Wales from 1998 to 16 March 2001.

Fitzgerald has been the chairperson of both the Australian Heritage Commission and the National Institute for Law, Ethics and Public Affairs, as well as being the inaugural chancellor of the University of the Sunshine Coast.

In January 2022, Queensland Premier Annastacia Palaszczuk announced Fitzgerald would chair a commission of inquiry into the State's anti-corruption body, the Crime and Corruption Commission, after a scathing 2021 report by its parliamentary oversight committee.

== Retirement ==
After retiring in 2001, Fitzgerald worked primarily as a mediator and arbitrator.

In 2001, he investigated alcohol abuse in Indigenous communities, and was shocked by the extent of the statewide problem. His "Fitzgerald Report" (Cape York Justice Study, presented to Parliament in November 2001) recommended to the Queensland Government that unless things improved dramatically within a period of three years, that alcohol should be banned, in consultation with the communities. One of the findings related to communities relying on the income generated by sales of alcohol in canteens, recommending that this perceived conflict of interest end. The Indigenous Communities Liquor Licences Bill 2002 (Qld) and the Community Services Legislation Amendment Bill 2002 were introduced as part of the government response to the report.

In July 2009, following the Gordon Nuttall scandal and public criticisms of contemporary governance in Queensland, Fitzgerald revealed his relocation to New South Wales was due in large part to the 1998 election of the Beattie Labor government and the loss of momentum for reform.

In 2013 and 2014, Fitzgerald criticised the Queensland government led by Campbell Newman over new laws targeting bikies and sex offenders, as well as the appointment of Tim Carmody as Chief Justice of Queensland.

== Legacy ==
The Tony Fitzgerald Memorial Community Award is awarded annually by the Australian Human Rights Commission "to a person with a track record in promoting and advancing human rights in the Australian community on a not-for-profit basis".

Fitzgerald donated his personal collection to the State Library of Queensland. This significant collection of items primarily relates to the events associated with the Commission of Inquiry. The material largely consists of newspaper clippings, original newspaper and magazine articles, courtroom sketches, cartoons and Fitzgerald’s personal papers. The collection also reflects political life in Queensland in the years leading up to and following the Inquiry.

In 2023, Tony Fitzgerald was awarded the Queensland Greats award in recognition of his service to law and the people of Queensland.

== Publications ==
=== Inquiry reports ===
- Commission of Inquiry into Possible Illegal Activities and Associated Police Misconduct | 1989
- Commission of Inquiry into the Conservation, Management and Use of Fraser Island and the Great Sandy Region | 1991
- Cape York Justice Study | 2001
- Commission of Inquiry relating to the Crime and Corruption Commission | 2022

=== Opinion articles ===
- Queensland political ethics: A perfect oxymoron | Australian Broadcasting Corporation, 2015
- Queensland must put a stop to the political rot | Australian Broadcasting Corporation, 2015
- The only hope for democracy is for politicians to stand up to political parties | Australian Broadcasting Corporation, 2017

=== Judicial papers ===
- Law Reform - The Judge's Role | Mayo Lecture, 1994
- Crime, Disadvantage and Dilemmas of Justice | ANZ Society Annual Conference, 1997
- The Common Law 'Reasonable Man': Misogynist or Sensitive New Age Guy | Judicial Conference, Canberra, 1994

=== Speeches ===
- Speech at the Launch of the ART Integrity Awards | Accountability Round Table Parliamentary Integrity Awards Launch, 2010

== See also ==
- Judiciary of Australia
- List of Judges of the Supreme Court of Queensland
- Royal Commission

Legal offices
New title	President of the Queensland Court of Appeal; 1991-1998	Succeeded by Margaret McMurdo
