= Jean Dalton =

Australian judge

The Honourable Justice Jean Hazel Dalton

Judge of the Supreme Court of Queensland
- In office 25 February 2011 – 28 February 2025

Personal details
- Born: 3 December 1964 (age 61) Brisbane, Queensland, Australia
- Education: University of Queensland

Jean Hazel Dalton (born 3 December 1964) is a former justice of the Supreme Court of Queensland. She served as a judge of the Trial Division from 2011 and then as a judge of the Court of Appeal from 2022 until her retirement on 28 February 2025.

== Early life and education ==
Dalton was born in Brisbane and studied at the University of Queensland, graduating with a Bachelor of Arts in 1984 and a Bachelor of Laws with first class honours in 1986, receiving the University Medal in Law.

== Career ==
Dalton commenced her legal career as an associate to Supreme Court Justice Desmond Derrington, before becoming a clerk at Morris Fletcher & Cross. She was admitted to the bar in 1989 and had a diverse practice, covering medical negligence, commercial and corporate law. Dalton was appointed a Senior Counsel in 2004. Dalton also served as President of the Anti-Discrimination Tribunal, Deputy Chair of the Aboriginal and Torres Strait Islander Land Tribunal, and as a member of the Land Court.

In September 2023 she was appointed as a judge of the Court of Appeal of Tonga.

=== Supreme Court ===
Dalton was appointed to the Supreme Court on 25 February 2011, the 108th judge to be appointed. Dalton was the trial judge in a diverse range of cases, from refusing bail for a man accused of domestic violence while awaiting trial for other allegations of domestic violence, to a commercial dispute where the administrator was removed for preferring its own commercial interests to that of the fund. Dalton was scathing of the administrators and their lawyers, finding that the administrators had been extravagant in its use of member's funds, gave misleading information to creditors and that a solicitor’s affidavit was little more than combative and querulous commentary on the litigation. Dalton also had to decide whether to order that a baby be vaccinated against hepatitis B contrary to the wishes of the parents. The mother had chronic hepatitis B and Dalton held that it was in the child's best interests to be vaccinated.

While appointed to the Trial Division, Dalton delivered the leading judgment for the Court of Appeal in a personal injury case, finding that the judgment of the District Court was illogical and unreasonable to reject the evidence of the plaintiff.
