= Robert Gotterson =

Australian judge

Robert William Gotterson AO

Justice of the Supreme Court of Queensland
- Incumbent
- Assumed office 2 May 2012

Personal details
- Born: 28 December 1949 (age 76) Brisbane, Queensland, Australia

Robert William Gotterson AO (born 28 December 1949) is an Appeals Court justice at the Supreme Court of Queensland. He became Queen's Counsel in 1988 and previously served as president of the Bar Association of Queensland, the Australian Bar Association and the Law Council of Australia.

Gotterson was appointed an Officer of the Order of Australia (AO) in the 2014 Australia Day Honours "for distinguished service to the judiciary and to the law, to legal education, administration and professional standards through a range of senior roles, and to the community of Queensland."
