= Thomas O'Hagan (Australian judge) =

Australian judge

Thomas Carlyle O'Hagan (14 April 1903 – 18 July 1958) served as a judge from 16 October 1952 until 18 July 1958 on the Supreme Court of Queensland, which is the highest ranking court in the Australian State of Queensland.

O'Hagan died in office in 1958 and is buried in Toowong Cemetery.

== See also ==
- Judiciary of Australia
- List of Judges of the Supreme Court of Queensland
