= David Jackson (judge) =

Australian judge

The Honourable Justice David Jackson

Justice of the Supreme Court of Queensland
- Incumbent
- Assumed office 8 October 2012

David Jackson KC is a Judge in the Supreme Court of Queensland which is the highest ranking court in the Australian State of Queensland. He was appointed to the Supreme Court of Queensland on 8 October 2012.

== Career ==
Justice Jackson began his career at the Bar on 14 September 1977, where he was a pupil of John Dowsett. During his 35 years as a barrister, Jackson J predominantly practised in the field of commercial law, specialising in resource and mining law. On 29 November 1990, he was appointed Queen's Counsel.

While at the Bar, Jackson J was a member of the council of the Bar Association of Queensland and a director of the Association between 2011 and 2013. His Honour also served as a member of the Supreme Court Library Committee in 2012.

On 8 October 2012, his Honour was appointed a Judge of the Supreme Court of Queensland. His was the first swearing-in ceremony to take place in the Banco Court of the Queen Elizabeth II Courts of Law.

In August 2014, Jackson J was appointed as Chair of the Queensland Law Reform Commission. Under his Honour's leadership, the Law Reform Commission published - amongst others - the Review of consent laws and the excuse of mistake of fact, the Review of termination of pregnancy laws (which led to the introduction of the Termination of Pregnancy Act 2018), a Report on the Domestic Violence Disclosure Scheme, and a Report on Expunging criminal convictions for historical gay sex offences.
