= Anne Lyons =

Anne or Ann Lyons may refer to:

- Anne Theresa Bickerton Lyons (1815–1894), Baroness von Würtzburg
- Fay-Ann Lyons (born 1980), Trinidadian songwriter
- Ann Lyons (judge) (born 1953), justice of the Supreme Court of Queensland

== See also ==
- Anne Murray, Countess of Kinghorne, Scottish courtier who married Patrick Lyon, Lord Glamis
- Anne Bozeman Lyon (1860–1936), American author
- Jo Anne Lyon (born 1940), one of the General Superintendents of the Wesleyan Church
- Lyons (surname)
