= Ann Lyons (judge) =

Australian judge

Ann Lyons AM

Judge of the Supreme Court of Queensland
- Incumbent
- Assumed office 10 July 2006

Personal details
- Born: 23 November 1953 (age 72)
- Education: University of Queensland; Queensland University of Technology

Ann Lyons AM (born 23 November 1953) is justice of the Supreme Court of Queensland in the Trial Division. She has served on the court since 2006, and was previously a tutor and lecturer at the Queensland University of Technology Law School.

Lyons was appointed a Member of the Order of Australia in the 2024 King's Birthday Honours for "significant service to the judiciary, to the law, and to the community".

== See also ==
- List of judges of the Supreme Court of Queensland
