= James Burrows Thomas =

Australian judge

The Honourable Justice James Burrows Thomas AM KC (born 12 March 1935) was a judge on the Supreme Court of Queensland (1998–2002), which is the highest ranking court in the Australian State of Queensland.

== Personal ==
James Burrows Thomas was born on 12 March 1935 to Joseph Thomas and Norma Thomas (née Burrows). Thomas brought an unusually broad knowledge of life into his judicial career commencing his education at a public school and being a former builder's labourer.

He went to school at Windsor State School from 1940 to 1948.

While at high school at age 16 he commenced work as a builder's labourer and continued that work 2 months each year for six years.

After completing high school he continued his education at the Church of England Grammar School (1949–1952), and finally at the University of Queensland (1953–1958) where he obtained his BA and LLB. He married Joan Martin on 22 February 1963, has one daughter and three sons.

== Legal career ==
Thomas was admitted to Queensland Bar 1958. He began his career in private practice in 1959, and continued until practicing until 1982 when he became a judge. He was the Director of Barristers' Chambers Ltd from 1967 to 1976. He was on the Barristers' Board from 1973 through 1982. He became a QC in 1976.

Thomas was appointed as a Puisne Judge on 18 February 1982 and served until 29 July 1998. On 30 July 1998 he was appointed to the Court of Appeal Division where he stayed until his retirement. His work included decisions in Criminal Law. His expertise in that arena would later be relied upon after his retirement. Work as a Supreme Court Judge appealed to his intellect as he enjoys solving puzzles and described his work as a Judge as "being paid to do puzzles that I enjoy doing".

He retired in 2002 citing the fact that he was an outdoor person and the desire to retire early enough to "get a life while he still has one".

Thomas was a member of the Litigation Reform Commission from 1992 until 1997. In 1993 he submitted a paper on jury reform.

In 2007 the Queensland DPP reportedly relied upon his Criminal Law expertise in seeking his advice before making a decision regarding evidence in the Chris Hurley case.

== Other professional activities ==
- President, National Union AUS 1956–1957
- Member Council and Board of Governors International House 1955–1971
- CMF Captain AALC 1965–1972
- Council Chair of Queensland Conservatorium of Music 1982–1991
- Lecturer in Legal Ethics, University of Queensland, 1983–1992
- Member Faculty Board University of Queensland, 1975–1981

== Achievements ==
In 1994 Thomas was made a Member of the Order of Australia for his services to music education and legal ethics.

Thomas wrote Judicial Ethics in Australia in 1988; a 2nd edition was published in 1997 by the Law Book Company.

Thomas also wrote Curious Connections - Master Musicians and the Law, a study on the historical links between two seemingly disconnected professions.

Thomas published a memoir in 2011 entitled An Almost Forgotten World (Supreme Court of Queensland Library 2011).

== See also ==
- Judiciary of Australia
- List of Judges of the Supreme Court of Queensland
