= Peter Applegarth =

Australian judge

Peter David Talbot Applegarth AM (born 6 August 1958) is a justice of the Supreme Court of Queensland in the Trial Division.

== Early life and education ==
Peter David Talbot Applegarth was born on 6 August 1958 in Brisbane, Queensland. Justice Applegarth attended Brisbane State High School (1971–75), and graduated Bachelor of Arts (1978) and Bachelor of Laws with first class honours (1980) from the University of Queensland. He was awarded a scholarship to study post-graduate law at Oxford University.

== Career ==
As a Barrister, Applegarth acted in defence of freedom of speech at the Fitzgerald Inquiry, helping expose police and political corruption. Peter became Senior Counsel in 2001 and in 2008 was appointed to the Supreme Court. Justice Applegarth chairs the Queensland Law Reform Commission and in 2020 became a Member of the Order of Australia (AM) for significant service to law, judiciary and social justice.

He has served on the bench since 2008.
