= Alan Wilson (judge) =

Australian judge

Alan Wilson (born March 5, 1950) is justice of the Supreme Court of Queensland in the Trial Division. He was appointed to the bench in 2009, after serving as a judge in the District Court since 2001. He was named a Queen's Council in 1999.

== See also ==
- List of judges of the Supreme Court of Queensland
