= Richard Cooper (judge) =

Australian judge

Richard Ellard Cooper

Judge of the Federal Court of Australia
- In office 30 March 1992 – 14 March 2005

Personal details
- Born: 3 January 1947
- Died: 14 March 2005 (aged 58)
- Spouse: Penny Cooper

Richard Ellard Cooper (3 January 1947 – 14 March 2005) was a Judge of the Supreme Court of Queensland (2 February 1989 to 30 March 1992) and then a Judge of the Federal Court of Australia (30 March 1992 to 14 March 2005).

Cooper was educated at Sydney Boys High School from 1952–62, he graduated from the University of Queensland with a Master of Laws in 1979. Cooper served on the Queensland Law Reform Commission as deputy chairman from 1999 and as chairman in 1992 and 1993.
