= Lincoln Crowley =

Australian lawyer

The Honourable Justice Lincoln Crowley
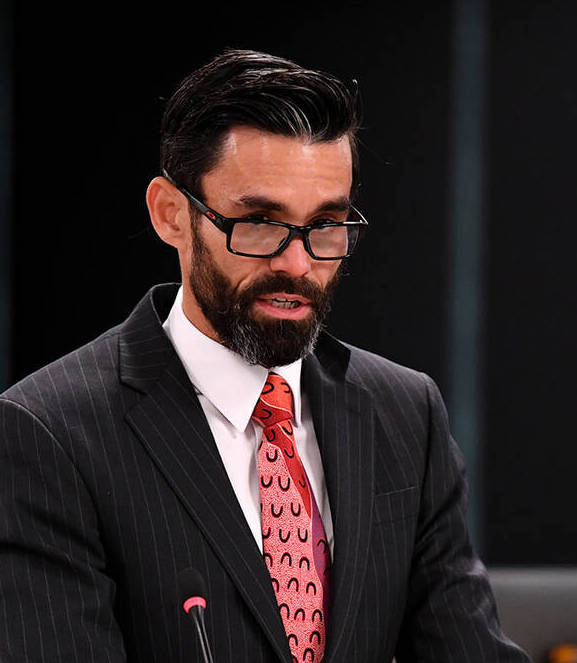
- Crowley in 2020

Judge of the Supreme Court of Queensland
- Incumbent
- Assumed office 13 June 2022

Personal details
- Education: James Cook University (LL.B.), Queensland University of Technology (Legal Practice Course, University of New England (B.A.)

Lincoln Crowley is an Australian lawyer, who was sworn in a judge of the Supreme Court of Queensland on 13 June 2022, becoming the first Indigenous Australian to be appointed as a State or Territory justice.

Justice Crowley grew up in Charters Towers, Queensland, attending high school there in the 1980's. His father was one of the Australian Defence Force's first Indigenous commissioned officers to attain the rank of Major. Crowley studied at James Cook University, graduating in 1996 with a Bachelor of Laws, and in 1999 was awarded a Graduate Diploma in Legal Practice from Queensland University of Technology.

Admitted to the legal profession in both Queensland and New South Wales, Justice Crowley became a barrister on 10 August 2007, and took silk (appointed Queen's Counsel) on 22 November 2018.
