= David North (judge) =

Australian judge

David North (born 24 March 1956) is justice of the Supreme Court of Queensland in the Trial Division. He took silk in 1996, and is an alum of the law program at the University of Queensland.
