= Duncan McMeekin =

Australian judge

The Honourable Duncan McMeekin

Judge of the Supreme Court of Queensland
- In office 2007–2018

Personal details
- Born: 2 January 1955 (age 71) Rabaul, Papua New Guinea
- Education: University of Queensland (BEc, LLB)
- Alma mater: University of Queensland
- Occupation: Mediator, arbitrator

Duncan McMeekin (born 2 January 1955) is an independent Australian mediator and arbitrator and a former Justice of the Supreme Court of Queensland in the Trial Division. He was born in Rabaul, Papua New Guinea and was educated at Nudgee College and the University of Queensland, graduating in economics and law. He became a Queen's Counsel in 1998 and was appointed a Judge of the Supreme Court of Queensland in 2007, where he served until 2018.

In addition to his judicial work, he was actively involved in the legal profession and the wider community, including service as chairman of the board of trustees of Rockhampton Girls Grammar School and leadership roles in professional and sporting organisations.
