= James Henry (judge) =

Australian judge

James Henry (born 24 October 1962) is a justice of the Supreme Court of Queensland in the Trial Division. He has served on the court since 2011, and became Senior Counsel in 2006. He is also a graduate of the University of Queensland school of law.
