= Anthe Philippides =

Australian judge

The Honourable Justice Anthe Ioanna Philippides

Judge of the Supreme Court of Queensland
- Incumbent
- Assumed office 14 December 2000

Personal details
- Education: Somerville House; University of Queensland; University of Cambridge
- Occupation: Judge, barrister

Anthe Ioanna Philippides was appointed as a judge on 14 December 2000 to the Supreme Court of Queensland, which is the highest ranking court in the Australian State of Queensland.

Philippides has also served on the Mental Health Court and the Southern District of the Land Appeal Court.

She was educated at Somerville House, the University of Queensland, and Gonville and Caius College, Cambridge.

== See also ==
- Judiciary of Australia
- List of Judges of the Supreme Court of Queensland
