= John Muir (judge) =

The Honourable John Muir QC

Judge of the Queensland Court of Appeal
- In office 12 July 2007 – 27 December 2014

Judge of the Supreme Court of Queensland
- In office 4 April 1997 – 27 December 2014

Personal details
- Born: 27 December 1944 Innisfail, Queensland, Australia
- Died: 10 February 2018 (aged 73) Corinda, Queensland, Australia

John Daniel Murray Muir (27 December 1944 – 10 February 2018) was an Appeals Court justice at the Supreme Court of Queensland. He was appointed in 2007, after serving between 2002 and 2007 as a Commercial List Judge for the Supreme Court of Queensland. He was a law graduate of the University of Queensland. His statutory retirement took effect on 27 December 2014. Muir died on 10 February 2018.
