= David Boddice =

Australian judge (born 1961)

David Boddice (born 9 November 1961) is justice of the Supreme Court of Queensland in the Trial Division. He took to the bench in 2010, retiring from practice and his position as Vice President of the Medico-Legal Society of Queensland. He is a graduate of the law program at the University of Queensland.
