= Soraya Ryan =

Australian judge

Soraya Ryan is an Australian judge. She has been a Judge of the Supreme Court of Queensland since 9 March 2018.

Ryan graduated from the University of Queensland with Bachelor of Commerce and Bachelor of Laws (First Class Honours), winning prizes in mining law, criminal law and evidence. She worked as an associate for Justice Glen Williams before being admitted as a solicitor in 1990; she then worked for a large firm before being admitted as a barrister in 1991. Ryan worked as a prosecutor at the Office of the Director of Public Prosecutions, rising from bail clerk to senior crown prosecutor. In 2003, she moved to Legal Aid Queensland as in-house defence counsel. She also lectured in evidence at the University of Queensland and served as a part-time commissioner of the Queensland Law Reform Commission. In 2010, she left Legal Aid Queensland and commenced practice at the private bar, specialising in criminal law. She was appointed Queen's Counsel in 2013. In 2015, she served as one of two Acting Commissioners of the Corruption and Crime Commission.

Notable cases Ryan has presided over on the Supreme Court include criminal proceedings involving businessman and politician Clive Palmer for breaching the Corporations Act and the appeal of Garry Dubois, who had been convicted of the McCulkin murders. Notable cases she had been involved in as a barrister included acting as a member of the defence team for Gable Tostee, acquitted over the fall death of Warriena Wright.
