= Helen Bowskill =

Chief Justice of the Supreme Court of Queensland

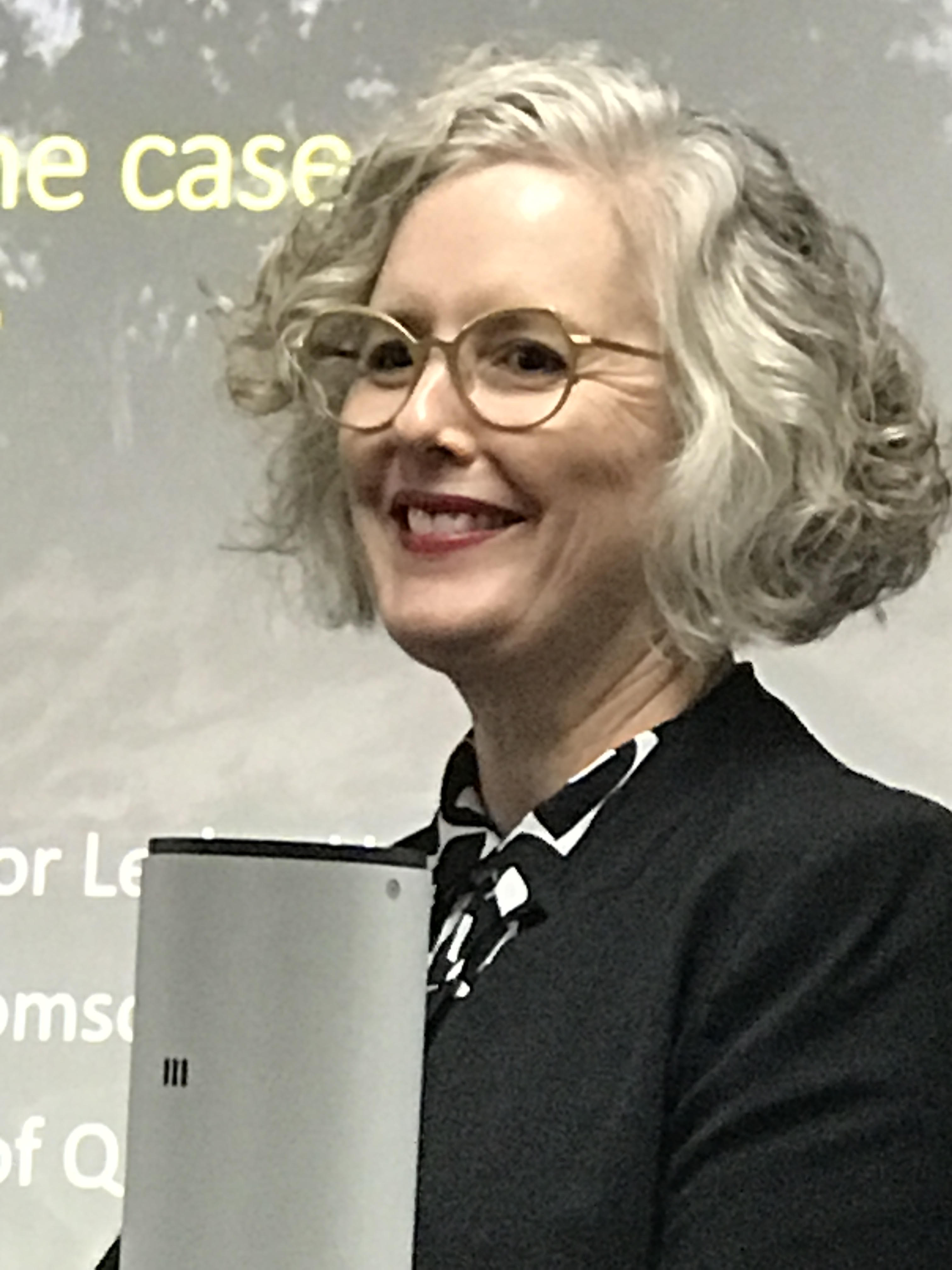
Helen Bowskill, 2023

Helen Bowskill is the Chief Justice of the Supreme Court of Queensland, the highest ranking court in the Australian state of Queensland. She was appointed to Chief Justice on 19 March 2022. She previously served as a judge of the Supreme Court of Queensland (2017–2022), Senior Judge Administrator (2021–22), and a judge of the District Court of Queensland, the Childrens Court of Queensland and the Planning and Environment Court of Queensland (2014–17).

As Chief Justice, she can serve as Acting Governor of Queensland when the Governor is unavailable.

== Education ==
Bowskill graduated from the Queensland University of Technology in 1995 with a Bachelor of Laws (Honours). Previously, she completed one year of a Bachelor of Arts degree at the University of Queensland, before switching into a communications degree at the Queensland University of Technology. She then enrolled in the drama program at that university, but only continued until the end of her orientation week. She then enrolled at the Lorraine Martin Secretarial College and began working as a junior secretary in a barrister’s chambers, which eventually led to her to pursuing a career as a barrister.

== Personal life ==
Bowskill has three daughters, Phoebe, Lucy and Zoe.
