= Bruce McPherson (judge) =

Australian judge

Bruce Harvey McPherson, CBE, QC (23 September 1936 – 7 October 2013) was a South African-born Australian jurist. Born in Melmoth, South Africa, he graduated from Trinity Hall, Cambridge in 1959, then moved to Brisbane, Australia in 1960. He was admitted to the Queensland Bar in 1965 and became Queen's Counsel in 1975, after marrying his second wife, Isobel Jacqueline Marie Milne. He was appointed to the Supreme Court of Queensland in January 1982 and then to the Court of Appeal on 16 December 1991, where he stayed until 22 September 2006.

McPherson was also a member of the Court of Appeal of the Solomon Islands.
