= Glenn Martin (judge) =

Australian judge

Glenn Martin (born 30 December 1955) was a judge of the Supreme Court of Queensland in the Trial Division. He was appointed in 2007. From 2013 to 2020 he held additional commissions as President of the Industrial Court of Queensland and the Queensland Industrial Relations Commission. In March 2022 he was appointed Senior Judge Administrator (head of the Trial Division) of the Supreme Court. Justice Martin was President of the Australian Judicial Officers Association from 2020 to 2022. He was an alternate member of the Council of the National Judicial College of Australia from 2016 to 2022 and was Chair of the NJCA's Programs Advisory Committee from 2018 to 2024. He is a former president of both the Australian Bar Association and the Bar Association of Queensland. He is a Life Member of the Bar Association of Queensland, the Australian Bar Association, the National Judicial College of Australia and the Australian Judicial Officers Association. In 2013 he was made a Member of the Order of Australia for significant service to the law, particularly through contributions to the Australian Bar Association, and to the community of Queensland. In 2025 he was a Visiting Judge at the ANU College of Law. He retired in December 2025. On 9 April 2026 he was appointed a Reserve Judge of the Supreme Court of Queensland for a term of five years.
