= Martin Moynihan (judge) =

The Honourable Martin Moynihan AO QC

Personal details
- Born: 1941
- Died: 2 April 2017, aged 76 Brisbane

The Hon Justice Martin Patrick Moynihan AO QC was an eminent Australian lawyer and judge.

Moynihan was born the son of barrister and acting Supreme Court Justice Nicholas Moynihan. After completing high school in 1958 at Marist College Ashgrove, Moynihan went on to study Bachelor of Laws at the University of Queensland. Graduating in 1965, he was subsequently called to the bar of the Supreme Court of Queensland. He practiced as a barrister for 19 years before becoming Queen's Council in 1980.

In 1984 Moynihan was appointed Judge of the Supreme Court of Queensland. In 1986, he famously heard the Mabo case for the High Court of Australia. Between 1991 and 2007, he served as Queensland's inaugural Senior Judge Administrator of the Supreme Court, forging many of the court's contemporary protocols. Moynihan served as chair of the Queensland Crime and Misconduct Commission from 2010-2011.

In 2001, Moynihan was awarded the Centenary Medal for long and distinguished service as a Judge of the Supreme Court of Queensland. In 2002, he was appointed as an Officer of the Order of Australia for services to the judiciary.
