= Hugh Fraser (Australian judge) =

Australian judge

Justice of the Supreme Court of Queensland
- Incumbent
- Assumed office 24 February 2008

Personal details
- Born: 14 July 1957 (age 67)

Hugh Fraser (born 14 July 1957) is an Appeals Court justice at the Supreme Court of Queensland. He graduated from the law program at the University of Queensland in 1979. He is a past president of the Bar Association of Queensland.
