= Queensland Civil and Administrative Tribunal =

- Established: 1 December 2009
- Jurisdiction: Queensland
- Location: Level 11, 259 Queen Street, Brisbane, Queensland
- Composition method: Appointments approved by the Governor of Queensland on the recommendation of the Queensland Government
- Authorised by: Queensland Civil and Administrative Tribunal Act 2009 (QLD)
- Website: https://www.qcat.qld.gov.au/

President
- Currently: Hon. Justice Kerri Mellifont
- Since: 22 November 2021

The Queensland Civil and Administrative Tribunal (QCAT) is statutory organisation responsible for reviewing administrative law decisions of some Queensland Government departments and agencies, and also adjudicating some civil law disputes. The tribunal was established under the Queensland Civil and Administrative Tribunal Act (2009).

Civil disputes in which the amount in dispute is more than $750,000 are heard by the Supreme Court of Queensland, while those in which the amount is $150,000 or less are heard by either the Magistrates Court or the QCAT.

== Jurisdiction ==
QCAT has a wide-ranging jurisdiction, including:

- adult administration and guardianship
- administrative decisions
- anti-discrimination
- building disputes
- children and young people
- consumer disputes
- debt disputes
- minor civil disputes
- occupational regulation
- other civil disputes
- residential tenancy disputes
- retail shop leases
- tree disputes.

== Decisions ==
All QCAT decisions are listed on the website of the Supreme Court Library Queensland.

== See also ==
- List of Queensland courts and tribunals
