= District Court of Queensland =

Second tier State court in Australia

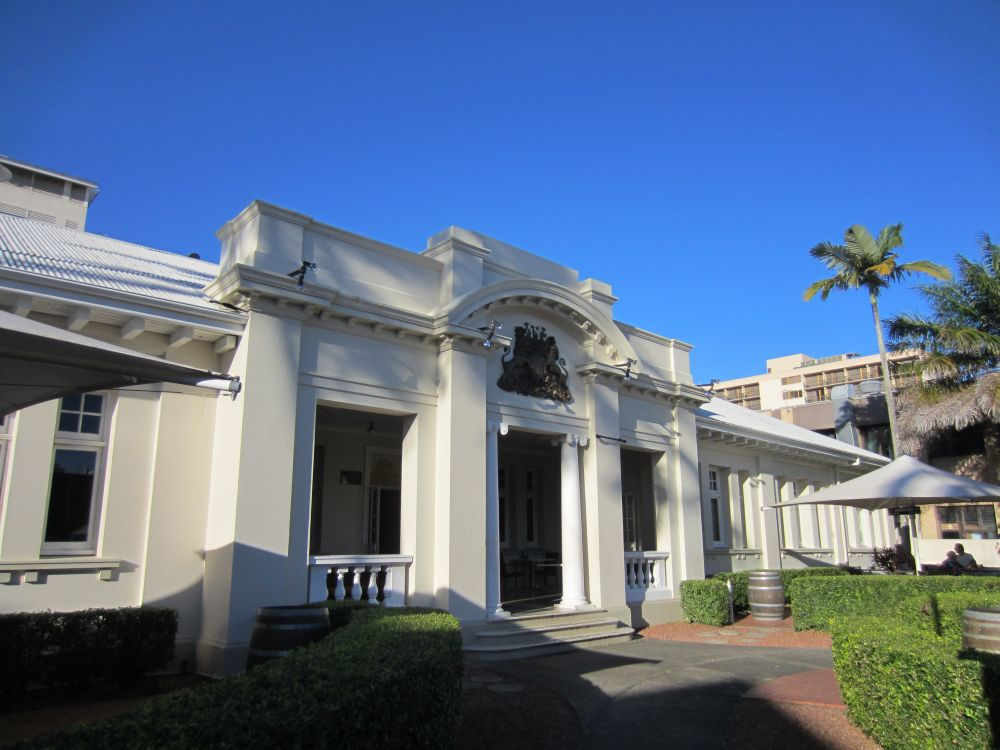
- Cairns Courthouse, a permanent location for the District Court
- Established: 1866–1921; 1958
- Jurisdiction: Queensland
- Location: Queen Elizabeth II Courts of Law in Brisbane; Beenleigh; Cairns; Ipswich; Maroochydore; Rockhampton; Southport, Townsville
- Composition method: Vice-regal appointment upon nomination by the Premier following the advice of the Attorney-General and Cabinet
- Authorised by: Queensland Parliament via the: District Court Act 1967 (QLD)
- Appeals to: Supreme Court of Queensland
- Appeals from: Magistrates Court of Queensland
- Judge term length: mandatory retirement by age of 70
- Number of positions: 39
- Website: https://www.courts.qld.gov.au/the-courts/district-court

Chief Judge
- Currently: Brian Devereaux SC
- Since: 17 August 2020

The District Court of Queensland (QDC) is the second tier in the court hierarchy of Queensland, Australia. The Court deals with serious criminal offences such as rape, armed robbery and fraud. Juries are used to decide if defendants are guilty or not guilty.

The original court was established in 1866 to ease the workload of the Supreme Court of Queensland. However, in 1921 the Queensland Parliament decided District Courts were no longer necessary and the courts were abolished. They were re-established by Parliament in 1958, again to relieve the workload in the Supreme Court. The present court is constituted under the District Court of Queensland Act 1967 (Qld). That Act amalgamated the previous District Court in existence prior to 1967 into the new District Court.

The District Court sits in 32 locations across Queensland. Judges also travel throughout the state to hear matters in regional and remote areas.

Decisions made by the District Court may be heard on appeal to the Supreme Court; and the District Court may sit as an appellate court for decisions made in the Magistrates Court of Queensland. The unreported judgments of the District Courts is published on the Queensland Judgments website.

== Jurisdiction ==
=== Civil ===
The District Court has jurisdiction to hear civil matters for which the amount in dispute is less than or equal to $750,000, and more than $150,000. Civil disputes in which the amount in dispute is more than $750,000 are heard by the Supreme Court, while those in which the amount is $150,000 or less are heard by either the Magistrates Court or the Queensland Civil and Administrative Tribunal. District Court civil decisions are published on the Queensland Judgments website.

=== Criminal ===
The District Court has the jurisdiction to hear criminal matters in which the defendant has been charged with a serious indictable offence (such as armed robbery, rape, and dangerous driving). These trials require a jury. District Court criminal decisions are published on the Queensland Judgments website.

== Composition ==
=== Chief Judge of the District Court ===
Name	Date appointed	Term in office	Notes
Chief Judge Brian G Devereaux SC	17 August 2020	6 years, 73 days	

=== Judges of the District Court ===
The District Court operates permanent courts in Brisbane, located in the Queen Elizabeth II Courts of Law building on George Street, Brisbane CBD; and Cairns, Ipswich, Maroochydore, Rockhampton, Southport, Townsville, and sits in regional areas as required. In Brisbane, the District Court shares the location with the Supreme Court.

As of April 2021, the judges who sat at the District Court, together with their location, were:

Name	Location	Date appointed	Term in office	Comments
Judge John Allen QC	Brisbane	17 December 2018	7 years, 316 days	Deputy President, Queensland Civil and Administrative Tribunal
Judge Ken Barlow QC	Brisbane	18 June 2019	7 years, 133 days	
Judge Michael J. F. Burnett	Rockhampton	3 November 2014	11 years, 360 days	
Judge Michael Byrne QC	Brisbane	20 January 2020	6 years, 282 days	
Judge Glen Cash QC	Maroochydore	2 July 2018	8 years, 119 days	
Judge Craig Chowdhury	Beenleigh	13 May 2016	10 years, 169 days	
Judge Leanne Clare SC	Brisbane	2 April 2008	18 years, 210 days	
Judge Jeffrey Clarke	Rockhampton	31 August 2020	6 years, 59 days	
Judge John Coker	Townsville	8 March 2018	8 years, 235 days	
Judge Geraldine Dann	Southport	7 September 2020	6 years, 52 days	
Judge Ian Dearden	Brisbane	28 February 2005	21 years, 243 days	
Justice Julie M. Dick SC	Brisbane	14 December 2000	25 years, 319 days	
Judge William G. Everson	Brisbane	2 April 2008	18 years, 210 days	
Judge Tracy Fantin QC	Brisbane	16 October 2017	9 years, 13 days	
Judge Brad Farr SC	Brisbane	11 August 2011	15 years, 79 days	
Judge Terry Gardiner	Brisbane	8 July 2019	7 years, 113 days	Also Chief Magistrate
Judge Alexander Horneman-Wren SC	Ipswich	20 October 2012	14 years, 9 days	
Judge Rowan Jackson QC	Southport	31 August 2020	6 years, 59 days	
Judge Nathan Jarro	Brisbane	26 March 2018	8 years, 217 days	
Judge Richard Jones	Brisbane	19 February 2010	16 years, 252 days	
Judge Nicole Kefford	Brisbane	14 November 2016	9 years, 349 days	
Judge David Kent QC	Southport	7 March 2016	10 years, 236 days	
Judge Gary Long SC	Maroochydore	13 May 2011	15 years, 169 days	
Judge Vicki Loury QC	Brisbane	17 December 2018	7 years, 316 days	
Judge Dennis Lynch QC	Ipswich	2 December 2016	9 years, 331 days	
Judge Gregory Lynham	Townsville	24 April 2017	9 years, 188 days	
Judge Dean P. Morzone QC	Cairns	27 October 2014	12 years, 2 days	
Judge Tony Moynihan QC	Brisbane	25 June 2015	11 years, 126 days	
Judge Catherine Muir	Southport	14 November 2016	10 years, 50 days	
Judge Katherine M. McGinness	Southport	17 July 2009	9 years, 349 days	
Judge Bernard Porter QC	Brisbane	28 August 2017	9 years, 62 days	
Judge Michael E. Rackemann SC	Brisbane	12 January 2004	22 years, 290 days	
Judge Anthony J. Rafter SC	Brisbane	15 December 2006	19 years, 318 days	
Judge David Reid	Brisbane	19 February 2010	16 years, 252 days	
Judge Deborah Richards	Brisbane	26 November 1998	27 years, 337 days	
Judge Orazio Rinaudo	Brisbane	8 July 2014	12 years, 113 days	
Judge Jennifer Rosengren	Brisbane	11 September 2017	9 years, 48 days	
Judge Suzanne C. Sheridan	Brisbane	24 November 2014	11 years, 339 days	
Judge Paul E. Smith	Brisbane	8 March 2013	13 years, 235 days	Also Judge Administrator
Judge Michael Williamson QC	Brisbane	19 March 2018	8 years, 224 days	

== See also ==
- Judiciary of Australia
- List of Queensland courts and tribunals
