= Chief Justice of Queensland =

Senior judge in Queensland, Australia

The chief justice of Queensland is the senior judge of the Supreme Court of Queensland and the highest ranking judicial officer in the Australian state of Queensland. The chief justice is both the judicial head of the Supreme Court, as well as the administrative head, responsible for arranging the business of the court and establishing its rules and procedures.

The current chief justice is Helen Bowskill, who was sworn in on 22 March 2022. Justice Bowskill is the second female chief justice of the Supreme Court of Queensland after her predecessor, Catherine Holmes SC.

== List of chief justices of Queensland ==
Name	Term	Reason for leaving	Death
Sir James Cockle	21 February 1863 – 24 June 1879	Retired	27 January 1895
Sir Charles Lilley	25 June 1879 – 13 March 1893	Resigned	20 August 1897
Sir Samuel Griffith	13 March 1893 – 4 October 1903	Appointed Chief Justice of the High Court of Australia	9 August 1920
Sir Pope Alexander Cooper	21 October 1903 – 31 March 1922	Retired	30 August 1923
Thomas McCawley	1 April 1922 – 16 April 1925	Death	16 April 1925
Sir James Blair	24 April 1925 – 16 May 1940	Retired	18 November 1944
Hugh Denis Macrossan	17 May 1940 – 23 June 1940	Death	23 June 1940
Sir William Webb	27 June 1940 – 15 May 1946	Appointed to the High Court of Australia	11 August 1972
Neal Macrossan	23 April 1946 – 30 December 1955	Death	30 December 1955
Sir Alan Mansfield	9 February 1956 – 21 February 1966	Appointed as Governor of Queensland	17 July 1980
William Mack	24 February 1966 – 12 May 1971	Retired	26 July 1979
Sir Mostyn Hanger	13 May 1971 – 18 July 1977	Retired	11 August 1980
Sir Charles Wanstall	19 July 1977 – 17 February 1982	Retired	17 October 1999
Sir Walter Campbell	18 February 1982 – 7 July 1985	Appointed as Governor of Queensland	4 September 2004
Sir Dormer Andrews	8 July 1985 – 7 April 1989	Retired	28 July 2004
John Murtagh Macrossan	10 April 1989 – 16 February 1998	Retired	5 August 2008
Paul de Jersey	21 September 1998 – 8 July 2014	Appointed as Governor of Queensland	
Tim Carmody	8 July 2014 – 1 July 2015	Resigned	
Catherine Holmes	11 September 2015 – 19 March 2022	Retired	
Helen Bowskill	19 March 2022 – present		

== See also ==
- Judiciary of Australia
- Supreme Court of Queensland
