= Paul de Jersey =

Governor of Queensland from 2014 to 2021

The Honourable Paul de Jersey AC, CVO, KC
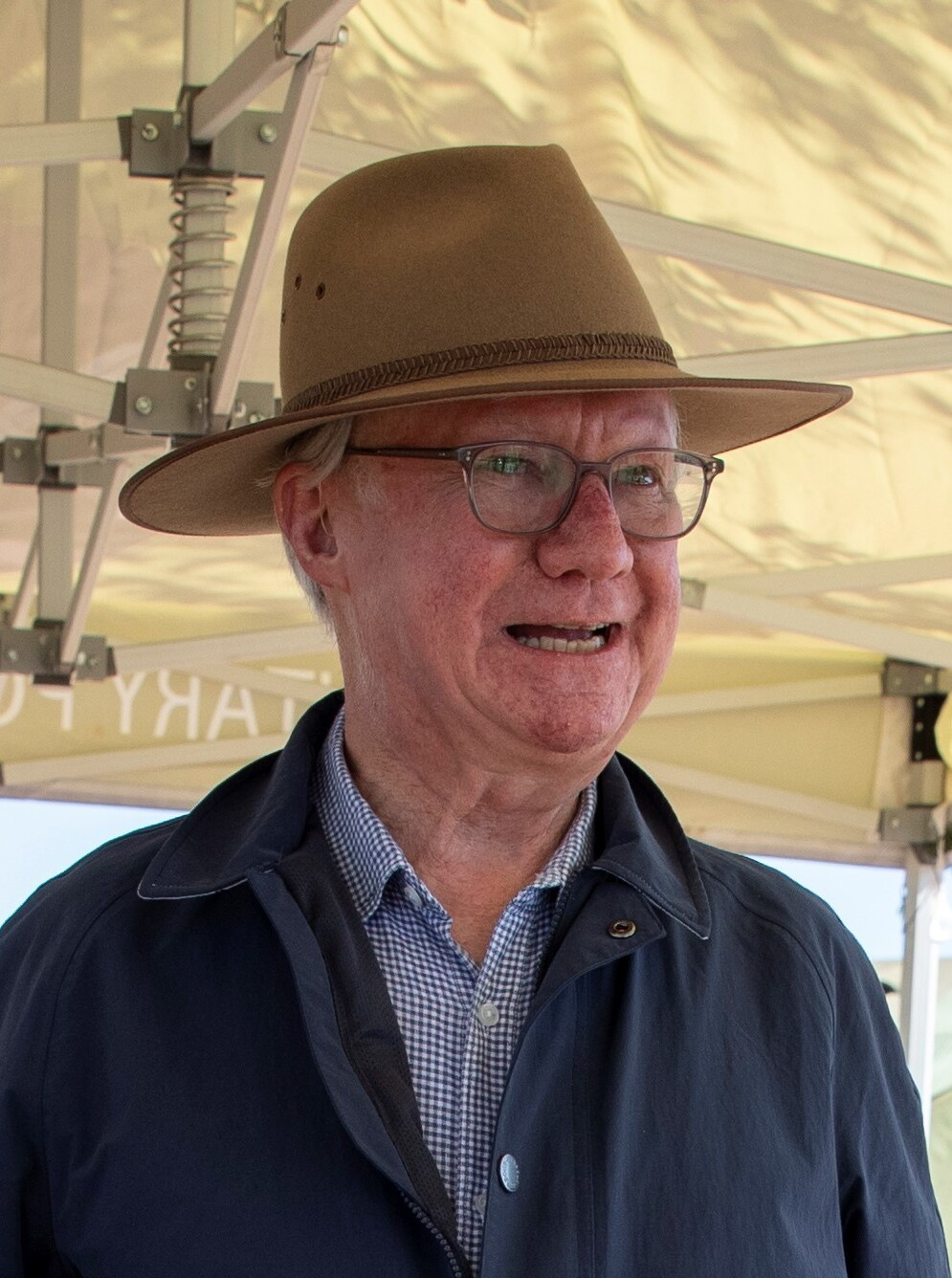
- Paul de Jersey in 2021

26th Governor of Queensland
- In office 29 July 2014 – 1 November 2021
- Monarch: Elizabeth II
- Premier: Campbell Newman; Annastacia Palaszczuk
- Preceded by: Penelope Wensley
- Succeeded by: Jeannette Young

17th Chief Justice of Queensland
- In office 17 February 1998 – 8 July 2014
- Nominated by: Rob Borbidge
- Appointed by: Peter Arnison representing Queen Elizabeth II
- Governor: Peter Arnison (1997–2003); Quentin Bryce (2003–08); Penelope Wensley (2008–14)
- Preceded by: John Macrossan
- Succeeded by: Timothy Carmody

Personal details
- Born: 21 September 1948 (age 77) Brisbane, Queensland, Australia
- Education: University of Queensland
- Awards: Companion of the Order of Australia; Commander of the Royal Victorian Order; Knight of the Order of St John

Military service
- Allegiance: Australia
- Branch/service: Australian Army Reserve
- Years of service: 1966–1971
- Rank: Lieutenant
- Unit: Queensland University Regiment

Paul de Jersey, AC, CVO, KC (born 21 September 1948) is an Australian jurist who served as the 26th Governor of Queensland, from July 2014 to November 2021. He was previously the 17th Chief Justice of Queensland from 1998 to 2014.

== Education ==
De Jersey spent his childhood in Longreach in rural Queensland and was educated at the Anglican Church Grammar School (1961–1965). He studied at the University of Queensland, where he graduated with a Bachelor of Arts and a Bachelor of Laws with Honours in 1971. He was part of the Queensland University Regiment from 1966 to 1971 and was commissioned in 1969.

== Career ==
De Jersey practiced law in Queensland and was called to the Queensland Bar in 1971, at the age of 23. At 33, he took silk as a Queen's Counsel, in 1981.

At the Bar, De Jersey practiced in the commercial field; appeared in constitutional cases before the High Court of Australia, and also appeared before the Judicial Committee of the Privy Council. He was appointed a Judge of the Supreme Court of Queensland in 1985, at the age of 36, and was the commercial causes judge between 1986 and 1989. De Jersey was the judge constituting the Mental Health Tribunal between 1994 and 1996, the president of the Queensland Industrial Court between 1996 and 1997, and the chairman of the Law Reform Commission of Queensland from 1996 to 1997.

De Jersey was appointed Chief Justice of Queensland on 17 February 1998, at age 40, making him the second-youngest Chief Justice of Queensland, at the time. As chief justice, he noted: "I'm very concerned at suggestions that judges are out of touch with community standards and expectations. (...) it behoves the Chief Justice to interact with the community to a substantial extent."

He has been Chancellor of the Anglican Diocese of Brisbane since 1991. He was also Vice President of the Australian Cancer Society between 1995 and 1998 and its president between 1998 and 2001, a trustee of the National Breast Cancer Foundation between 1994 and 1999, and the chairman of the Queensland Cancer Fund (now the Cancer Council Queensland) between 1994 and 2001. He recently accepted the position of Chairman of School Council at his alma mater, the Anglican Church Grammar School.

== Governor of Queensland ==
De Jersey was appointed the 26th Governor of Queensland on 29 July 2014. On the retirement of Alex Chernov as Governor of Victoria on 1 July 2015, De Jersey became the longest-serving sitting governor of an Australian state and by custom assumed the additional office of Administrator of the Commonwealth who exercises the powers of the Governor-General of Australia in the governor-general's absence or disability.

In 2017 a German Shepherd named Gavel was appointed as the viceregal dog of the governor, after failing to become a police dog due to a too friendly temperament. A children's picture book was released in 2020 about his story, which was followed by his retirement in 2021.

In November 2018, it was announced that De Jersey's original term had been extended by two years through to 29 July 2021. Premier Annastacia Palaszczuk noted De Jersey "has undertaken an extensive program of community engagements and regional travel, ensuring that as many Queenslanders as possible have had the opportunity to see and meet him". In June 2021, it was announced that he would stay on until November to allow Jeannette Young, his successor, to focus on the COVID-19 vaccine rollout as Chief Health Officer, before taking up the role of governor.

== Post-viceregal career ==
In 2022, De Jersey was appointed a judge of the Court of Appeal of Tonga.

== Personal life ==
De Jersey married Kaye Brown in 1971. Together they have three children and three grandchildren. Kaye was awarded the Medal of the Order of Australia in the 2025 Australia Day Honours for "service to the Crown and to the community of Queensland".

== Titles, styles, and honours ==
Viceregal styles of Paul de Jersey (2014–2021)
- Reference style: His Excellency the Honourable
- Spoken style: Your Excellency

De Jersey's style and title as governor in full was: His Excellency the Honourable Paul de Jersey, Companion of the Order of Australia, Commander of the Royal Victorian Order, Knight of Grace of the Order of St John, Queen's Counsel, Governor of the State of Queensland in the Commonwealth of Australia.

- As Administrator: His Excellency the Honourable Paul de Jersey, Companion of the Order of Australia, Commander of the Royal Victorian Order, Knight of Grace of the Order of St John, Queen's Counsel, Administrator of the Commonwealth of Australia.

Companion of the Order of Australia (AC)	12 June 2000
Commander of the Royal Victorian Order (CVO)	12 June 2021
Knight of Grace of the Order of St John	19 November 2014
Centenary Medal	2003
Australian Defence Medal	

- Life Member of the Bar Association of Queensland

=== Honorary degrees ===
- 2000: Honorary Doctorate of the University of Queensland.
- 2008: Honorary Doctorate of the University of Southern Queensland.
- (Queensland) 2014: Honorary Doctorate of the Griffith University.

==== Honorary appointments ====
- (Australia) Australian Army 28 July 2014 – 1 November 2021: Regimental Colonel of the Royal Queensland Regiment.
- (United Kingdom) Order of St John 28 July 2014 – 1 November 2021: Deputy Prior of the Order of St John.
- Scouts Australia 28 July 2014 – 1 November 2021: Chief Scout of Scouts Australia QLD
- Royal Australian Air Force 17 December 2014 – 1 November 2021: Honorary Air Commodore of No. 23 Squadron RAAF

Legal offices
Preceded by John Murtagh Macrossan	Chief Justice of Queensland; 1998–2014	Succeeded by Tim Carmody
Government offices
Preceded by Penelope Wensley	Governor of Queensland; 2014–2021	Succeeded by Jeannette Young
