= Supreme Court of Queensland =

Highest court in the state of Queensland, Australia

- Logo

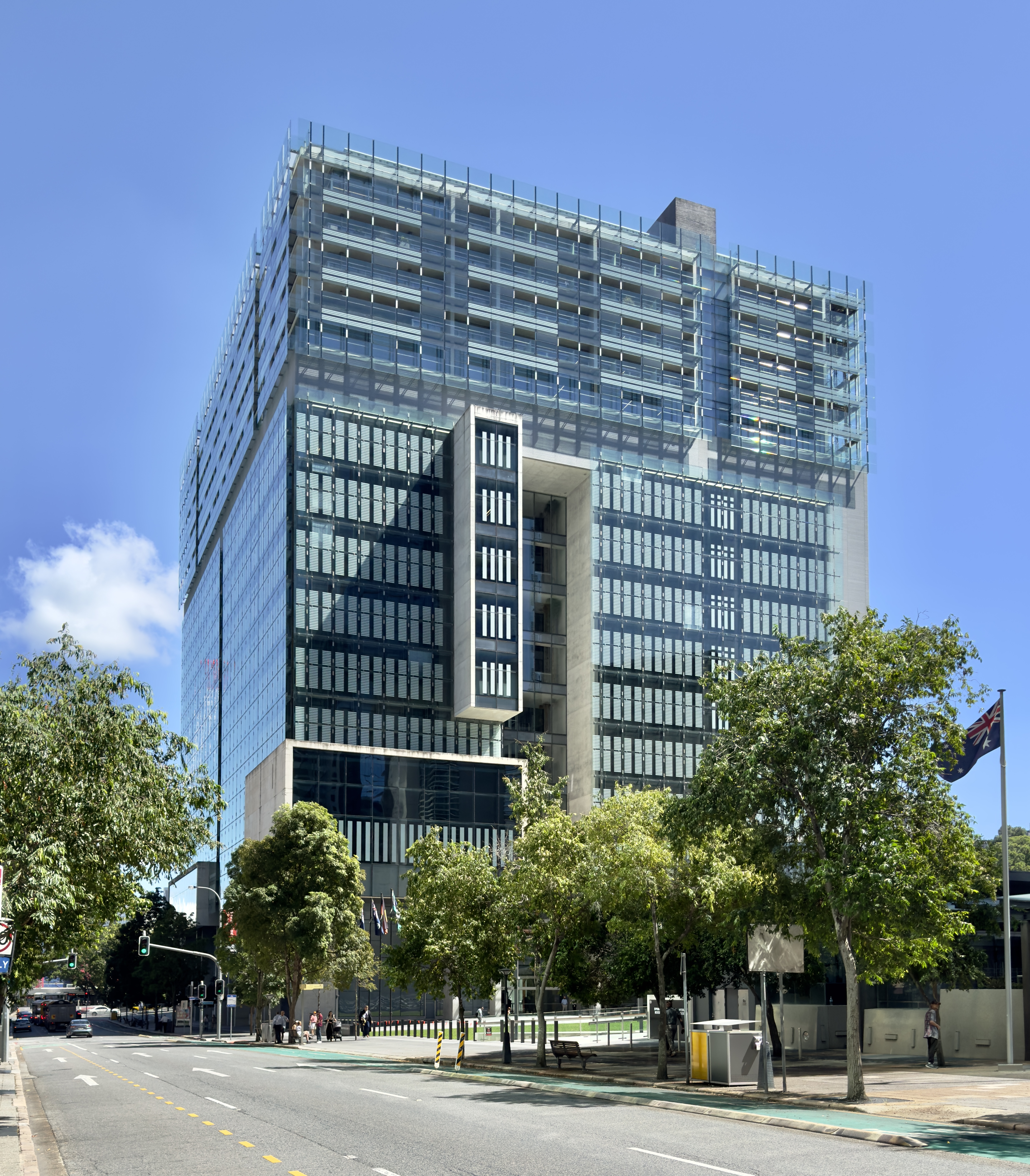
- Façade of the Queen Elizabeth II Courts of Law building in Brisbane—the main sitting location of the Court.
- Interactive map of Supreme Court of Queensland
- 27°28′4″S 153°1′14″E
- Established: 7 August 1861
- Jurisdiction: Queensland
- Location: Brisbane
- Coordinates: 27°28′4″S 153°1′14″E
- Composition method: Judges appointed by the governor on the advice of the premier (following consultation with the attorney-general and Cabinet)
- Authorised by: Queensland Parliament via the: Constitution Act 1867 (Qld); Supreme Court Act 1991 (Qld)
- Appeals to: High Court of Australia
- Appeals from: District Court of Queensland
- Judge term length: mandatory retirement by age of 70
- Number of positions: 26
- Website: https://www.courts.qld.gov.au/the-courts/supreme-court

Chief Justice of Queensland
- Currently: Helen Bowskill
- Since: 19 March 2022

President of the Court of Appeal
- Currently: Debra Mullins
- Since: 3 April 2017

Senior Judge Administrator, Trial Division
- Currently: Glenn Martin
- Since: 24 August 2021

The Supreme Court of Queensland is the highest court in the Australian state of Queensland. It was formerly the Brisbane Supreme Court, in the colony of Queensland.

The original jurisdiction of the Supreme Court allows its trial division to hear civil matters involving claims of more than $750,000; criminal matters involving serious offences (including murder and manslaughter); and matters arising under the Corporations Act 2001 (Cth) and cross-vesting legislation. A jury decides whether the defendant is guilty or not guilty. The division also hears all civil matters involving amounts of more than $750,000. A jury may decide these disputes.

The appellate jurisdiction of the Supreme Court allows its Court of Appeal to hear cases on appeal from the District Court, the trial division of the Supreme Court, and a number of other judicial tribunals in Queensland. Decisions made by the Supreme Court of Queensland's Court of Appeal may be taken on appeal to the High Court of Australia in Canberra only by a grant of special leave of the High Court of Australia.

== History ==
The Supreme Court of Queensland was founded on 7 August 1861, with the assent of the Supreme Court Constitution Amendment Act 1861 (Qld). Two subsequent pieces of legislation, including the Additional Judge Act 1862 (Qld) and the Supreme Court Act 1863 (Qld), were also necessary to establish the court's operating system.

Prior to separation of Queensland from New South Wales, the former naval officer, Captain John Clements Wickham, tried minor crimes in the Moreton Bay District. More serious cases were tried at the Supreme Court of New South Wales in Sydney. Two years before separation from New South Wales, the Moreton Bay Supreme Court Act 1857 (NSW) established the jurisdiction of the Supreme Court of New South Wales in the Moreton Bay District and Samuel Milford served as Judge. Milford resigned in February 1859, and was replaced by Alfred Lutwyche.

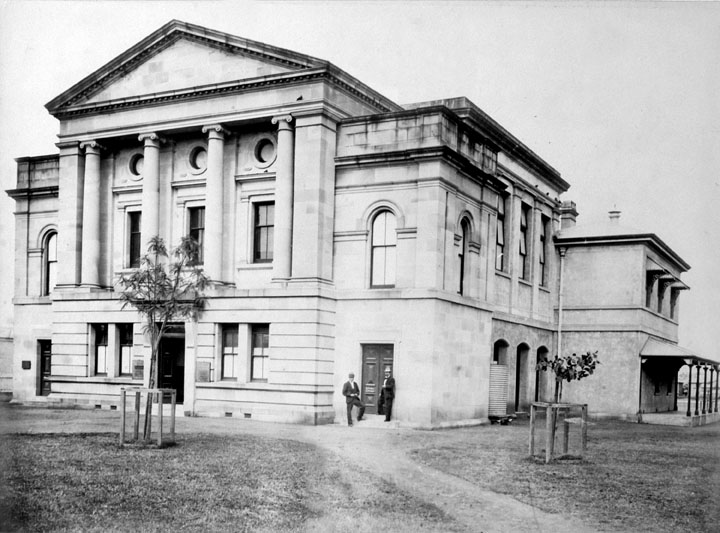
Rockhampton Supreme Court, c. 1890

Initially, the Brisbane Supreme Court served as the Supreme Court for all of Queensland. As the colony's population grew, two other courts were constructed. The first sittings of the Northern Supreme Court were held at Bowen in 1874 and the Bowen Court House was built in 1880 in a classical revival style. The Central Supreme Court was officially opened at Rockhampton in 1896. After the opening of the Central Supreme Court at Rockhampton, the Northern Supreme Court moved from Bowen to Townsville. Justice Virgil Power, who served as the first Judge of the Central Supreme Court, was the first Queensland-born Supreme Court Judge. As the population of Queensland has grown, additional courts have been built at locations such as Bundaberg, Mackay, Cairns, Longreach, Maryborough, Roma and Townsville.

Although the Brisbane Supreme Court initially served the needs of the entire colony of Queensland, it did not occupy a purpose-built building until 1879. Until then, the Brisbane Court sat at the Old Convict Barracks in Queen Street. These barracks were in disrepair and a number of improvements, including new sets of windows, had to be constructed to allow the continued sitting of the Court. Furthermore, on Sundays, the area of the barracks used by the Court was also used as a church. Although the Court's surroundings were not elaborate, Parliament did provide an annual grant towards the establishment of a Supreme Court Library from 1861 to 1879.

By 1870, despite minor building modifications to the convict barracks, it had become clear that a new building was required to house the Brisbane Supreme Court. A site on George Street was selected and the prominent colonial architect, Francis Drummond Greville Stanley, submitted plans for an elaborate neoclassical building which was two storeys tall. These original plans featured stone floors and other sophisticated details. They were later modified for financial reasons and in 1875 John Petrie successfully tendered to construct the building.

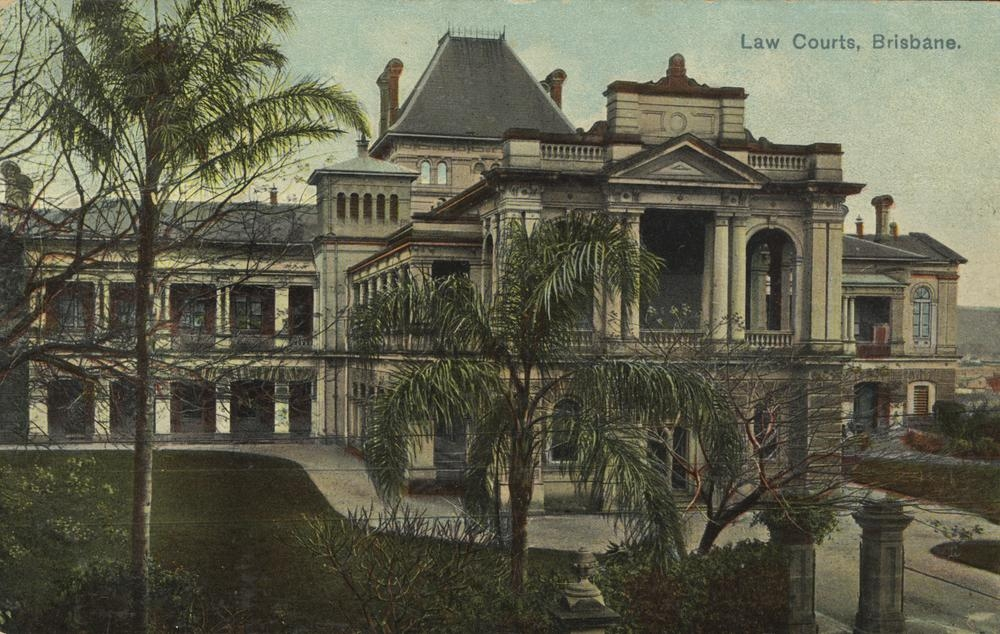
Supreme Court building, Brisbane, c. 1891

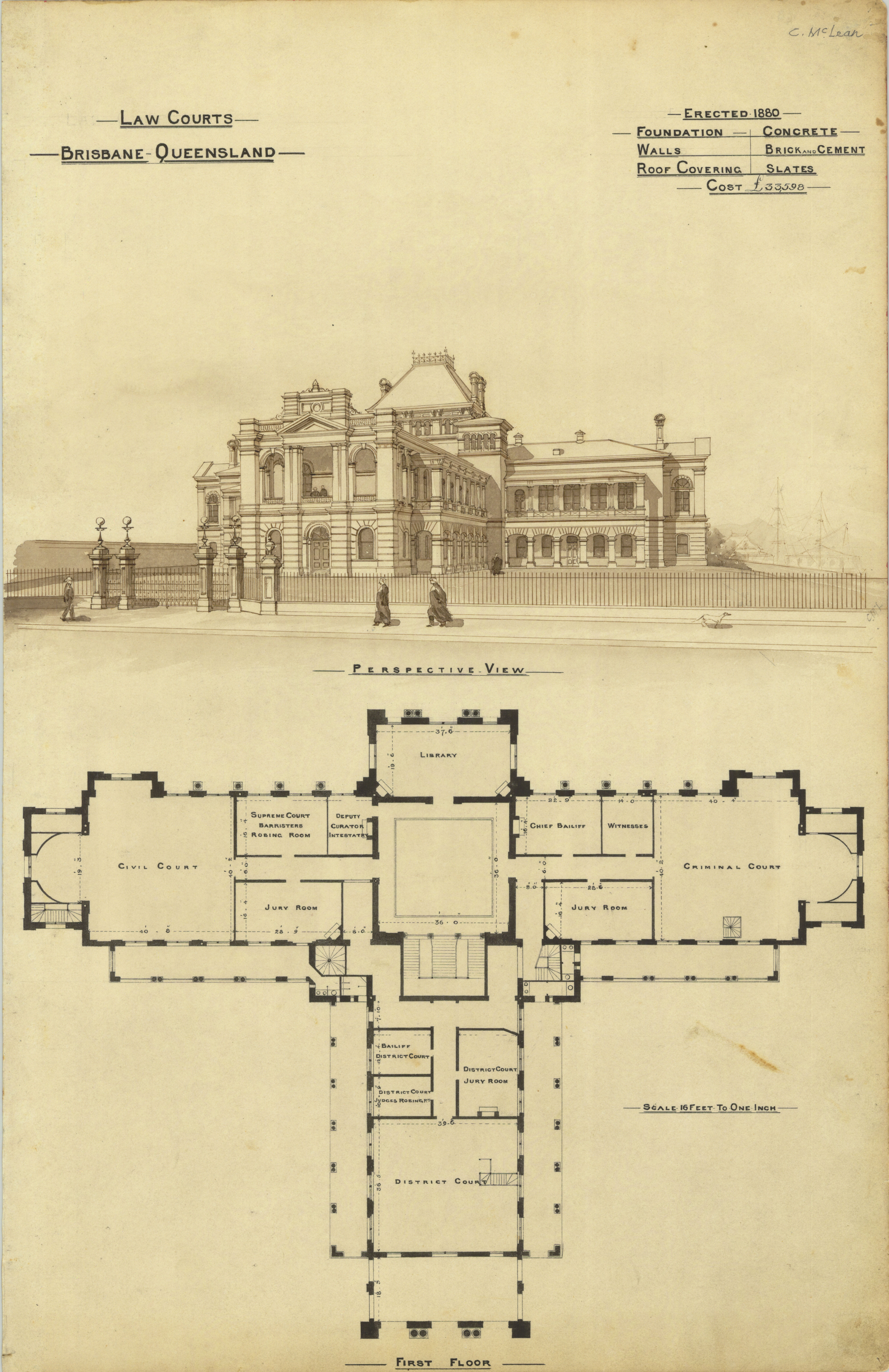
Architectural plans for the first Law Courts, constructed 1880

On 6 March 1879, the new Supreme Court opened. The entrance on the North Quay frontage had been designed as the main entrance but this was soon superseded by the George Street entrance. In 1880, iron gates were also added to the building. In 1931, the Queensland Public Works Department provided funds for the renovation of the interior of the Brisbane Supreme Court.

On the night of 1 September 1968, the building that housed the Brisbane Supreme Court was damaged by arson. It was subsequently demolished, and in 1976, it was replaced with a building designed by Bligh Jessup Bretnall and was opened by Queensland Governor Sir James Ramsay on 3 September 1981.

In 1989, Justice Angelo Vasta was removed from the court by Queensland Governor on the request of the Parliament. This was the first time since federation that any state had used that method to remove a sitting judge from a Supreme Court. Vasta was found to be not "a fit and proper person to continue in office" after giving false evidence to an investigation related to the Fitzgerald Inquiry.

In 2008, a $600 million building program began to create a new Brisbane Supreme Court and District Court building, designed by Architectus Brisbane, led by Prof John Hockings. The building is known as the Queen Elizabeth II Courts of Law and was officially opened on Friday 3 August 2012 by Queensland Governor Penelope Wensley. It incorporates a public plaza and links to the existing Brisbane Magistrates Court building. The precinct occupies an entire city block between George, Roma, and Turbot streets.

== Composition ==
In 1991 the Queensland Supreme Court was restructured into two divisions, the Trial Division and the Court of Appeal. The Court is headed by the Chief Justice of Queensland (currently Chief Justice Helen Bowskill) who sits in both the Trial Division and the Court of Appeal.

The Court of Appeal comprises the President (currently President Debra Mullins) and four Judges of Appeal, who sit only in the Court of Appeal. Proceedings in the Court of Appeal are usually heard by three judges. The Trial Division comprises a number of trial judges and is headed by the Senior Judge Administrator (currently Justice Martin Burns). Proceedings in the Trial Division are heard by one trial judge. Most trial division judges also rotate through the Court of Appeal, usually for three-week periods.

Appeals from:

- The Trial Division is heard by the Court of Appeal; and
- The Court of Appeal is heard by the High Court of Australia.

The Court of Appeal also hears appeals from the District Court of Queensland.

Judges of the Court as of November 2026 are:

Position	Name	Date appointed	Term in office	Notes
Chief Justice	Helen Bowskill	22 March 2022	4 years, 229 days	
President, Court of Appeal	Debra Mullins AO	3 April 2017	9 years, 217 days	
Judges of Appeal	John K. Bond	22 April 2021	5 years, 198 days	
Judges of Appeal	David Boddice	10 April 2023	3 years, 210 days	
Judges of Appeal	Susan Brown	25 June 2024	2 years, 134 days	
Judges of Appeal	Shane Doyle	28 July 2025	1 year, 101 days	
Judges of Appeal	Declan A Kelly	1 November 2026	5 days	
Senior Judge Administrator	Martin Burns	31 December 2025	310 days	
Judges of the Trial Division	Nicholas Andreatidis	12 October 2026	25 days	
Judges of the Trial Division	Peter Callaghan	10 February 2020	6 years, 269 days	
Judges of the Trial Division	Sean Cooper	11 April 2022	4 years, 209 days	
Judges of the Trial Division	Michael Copley	8 May 2024	2 years, 182 days	
Judges of the Trial Division	Graeme Crow	26 February 2018	8 years, 253 days	
Judges of the Trial Division	Lincoln Crowley	13 June 2022	4 years, 146 days	
Judges of the Trial Division	Peter Davis	16 October 2017	9 years, 21 days	
Judges of the Trial Division	Paul Freeburn	20 May 2021	5 years, 170 days	
Judges of the Trial Division	James Henry	12 September 2011	15 years, 55 days	
Judges of the Trial Division	Melanie Hindman	30 May 2022	4 years, 160 days	
Judges of the Trial Division	Christopher Johnstone	28 July 2025	1 year, 101 days	
Judges of the Trial Division	Patrick McCafferty	24 November 2025	347 days	
Judges of the Trial Division	Scott McLeod	13 April 2026	207 days	
Judges of the Trial Division	Kerri Mellifont	4 October 2021	5 years, 33 days	
Judges of the Trial Division	Catherine Muir	11 April 2023	3 years, 209 days	
Judges of the Trial Division	Soraya Ryan	9 March 2018	8 years, 242 days	
Judges of the Trial Division	Darlene Skennar	12 October 2026	25 days	
Judges of the Trial Division	Paul Smith AM	31 March 2025	1 year, 220 days	
Judges of the Trial Division	Tom Sullivan	24 February 2023	3 years, 255 days	
Judges of the Trial Division	Rebecca Treston	8 May 2024	2 years, 182 days	
Judges of the Trial Division	Frances Williams	17 February 2020	6 years, 262 days	
Judges of the Trial Division	Elizabeth Wilson	3 December 2018	7 years, 338 days	

=== Noted former judges ===
- The Honourable Paul de Jersey AC, who later became Chief Justice of Queensland and Governor of Queensland
- Catherine Holmes AC, first female Chief Justice of Queensland.
- Sir James Blair, who later became Chief Justice of Queensland, lieutenant-governor of Queensland, Knight Commander of the Order of St Michael and St George (KCMG)
- Sir Walter Campbell, who later became Governor of Queensland
- Sir James Cockle, the first Chief Justice of Queensland
- Peter Connolly
- Edward Archibald Douglas, son of Queensland Premier, John Douglas
- Robert Johnstone Douglas, son of Queensland Premier, John Douglas
- Sir Harry Gibbs, who later became Chief Justice of Australia
- Sir Samuel Griffith, who later became the first Chief Justice of Australia
- Alfred Lutwyche, first judge
- Thomas McCawley
- Sir Edward Williams
- Sir William Webb, later appointed to the High Court of Australia and served as President of the International Military Tribunal for the Far East
- Angelo Vasta, the first Superior Court judge removed from office through an act of Parliament

== Facilities ==
The Supreme Court sits mainly in the Queen Elizabeth II Courts of Law in Brisbane, which also houses the District Court. The court began operating out of this facility on 27 August 2012, prior to which it was located in the Law Courts Complex.

The court also has judges permanently appointed to sit in Rockhampton, Townsville and Cairns, and regularly sits in other regional districts.

== See also ==
- Australian court hierarchy
- Judiciary of Australia
- List of Queensland courts and tribunals
- List of Judges of the Supreme Court of Queensland
