= Forster Inquiry =

2005 review of Queensland's health system

The Queensland Health Systems Review or Forster Inquiry was a 2005 Queensland inquiry "to undertake a review of the performance of Queensland Health’s administrative and workforce management systems with a focus on improving health outcomes for Queenslanders." It was conducted by Peter Forster who formerly consulted to the Fitzgerald Inquiry.

It was commissioned by the Queensland Government as a non-judicial inquiry specifically due to the political and public sentiments following the practices of Dr Jayant Patel at Bundaberg Hospital with a broader focus on the practices, systems and processes of Queensland Health.

== Background ==
A doctor at Bundaberg Hospital, Dr Jayant Patel, originally accused of gross negligence, and the systems of Queensland Health in allowing such alleged negligence was the subject of considerable public and political attention.

A number of inquiries were initiated by the Queensland Government. The Queensland Premier, Peter Beattie announced his government would "go further than holding a Commission of Inquiry into matters arising from the appointment of Dr Jayant Patel by also holding a major review of Queensland Health's administration, management and performance systems."

The Morris Inquiry or "Bundaberg Hospital Commission of Inquiry", was established, however was terminated after findings of bias by the Queensland Supreme Court, with terms of reference and interim investigations referred to the Forster Inquiry. Davies Commission was later established to complete the terms of reference of the Bundaberg Hospital Commission of Inquiry, as "Queensland Public Hospitals Commission of Inquiry".

The Forster Inquiry was announced on 16 April 2005, and the report was issued in September 2005.

== Recommendations ==
Recommendations included:

- address the most dysfunctional aspect of the organisation's culture through the appointment and development of leaders who can by example inspire staff and develop the attitudes, culture and beliefs desired
- address immediate workforce shortages to the greatest practical extent
- improve strategic and health service planning to ensure services are targeted towards the areas of greatest need
- strengthen partnerships between the public, non-government health service sectors to gain the best possible value from combined community resources
- ensure that the organisational arrangements that deliver health services are efficient and streamlined, and allocate as many resources as practical to frontline services, where clinicians work in teams and networks across Queensland to use scarce resources to best effect
- make better use of existing capacity to meet additional needs and provide additional capacity for areas of greatest need
- implement systems and procedures to ensure the recruitment and retention of a well qualified and experienced clinical workforce, to reduce adverse clinical events and to support clinicians in their efforts to continually improve clinical practices
- implement a range of systemic improvements relating to the way clinicians are supported, the manner in which assets are planned and managed, the manner in which IT and communications services are conceived and managed, and the way in which the performance of the health service will be monitored and reported
- improve avenues for members of the community and staff of the public health service to raise concerns about aspects of the service and have these concerns responsibly and appropriately addressed and resolved.

== Reception ==
Implementation of the recommendations is unclear, however the impact to staff and patients post review has faced criticism. For example, the difficulty of employing overseas trained doctors may have exacerbated staff shortage issues. Many of the original charges against Dr Jayant Patel were dropped, and this may have had the effect of diluting public sentiment to the original issues that led to the inquiry.
