= The Prince Charles Hospital =

Major cardiothoracic teaching and tertiary referral hospital in Brisbane, Australia

- Queensland Health (Metro North Health)

Geography
- Location: 627 Rode Rd, Chermside, Queensland, Australia
- Coordinates: 27.3899°S 153.0234°E

Organisation
- Care system: Public Medicare (AU)
- Type: Teaching and Specialist
- Network: Metro North Health

Services
- Emergency department: Adult and paediatric departments
- Beds: 690

Helipads
- Helipad: Yes (ICAO: YPRC)

History
- Founded: 1954; 72 years ago

Links
- Website: metronorth.health.qld.gov.au/tpch
- Lists: Hospitals in Australia

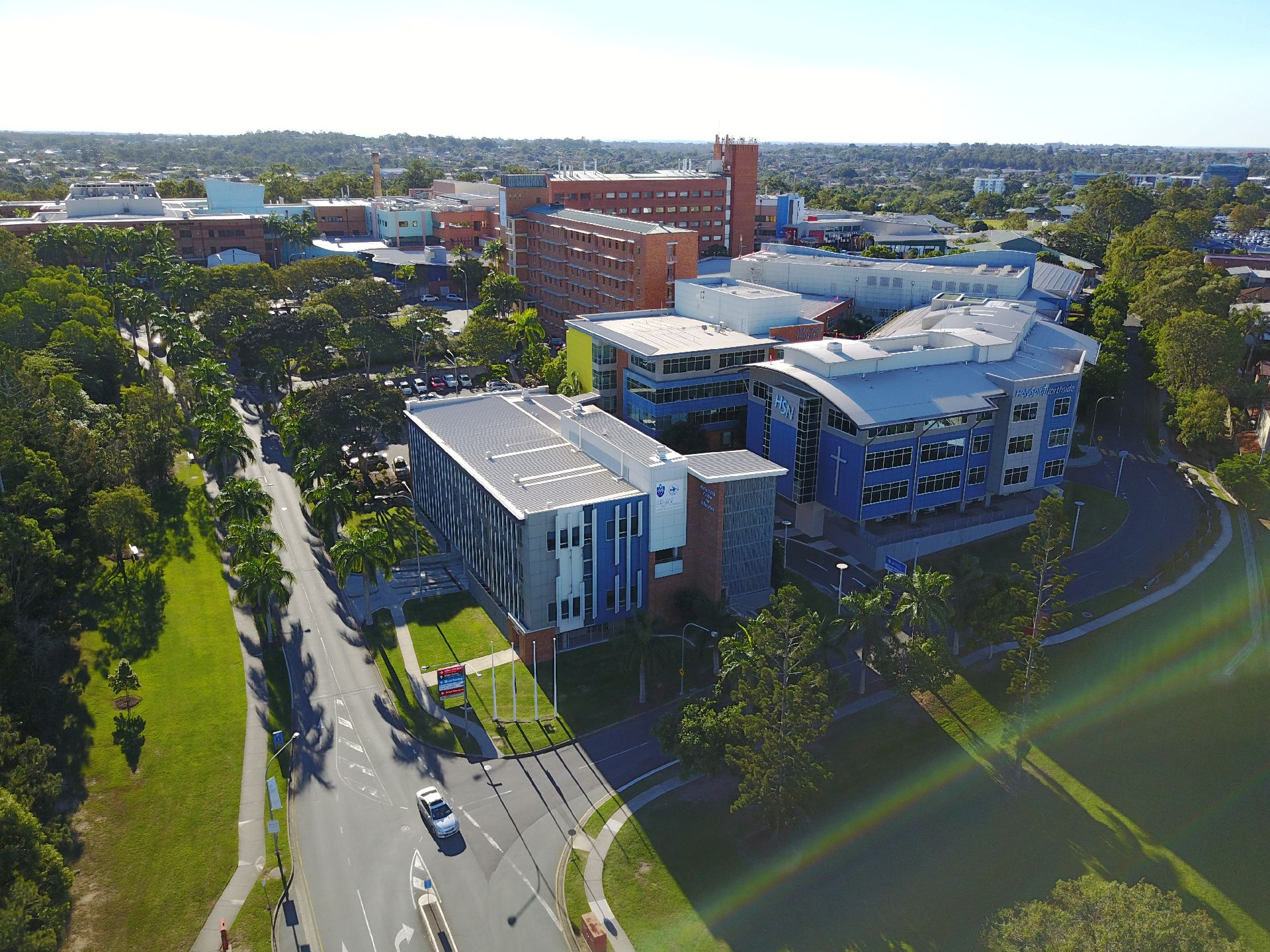
The Prince Charles Hospital

The Prince Charles Hospital (TPCH) is a major teaching and tertiary referral hospital in the northern suburb of Chermside in Brisbane, Queensland, Australia. TPCH is a public hospital operated by Metro North Health, the largest public health service in Queensland Health and in Australia. The hospital is described to be the "leading cardiothoracic hospital in Australia", and is the hub for specialised services including heart and lung transplants, adult cystic fibrosis, adult congenital heart disease and complex cardiac care. The Nujum Jawa Crisis Stabilisation Unit opened in September 2024 is running adjacent to the Emergency Department, will provide 24/7 crisis support as well as targeted care.

Beyond cardiothoracic care, healthcare services include general surgical and medical care, mental health services, paediatric and adult emergency departments, and specialist outpatient, rehabilitation, and palliative care services. The hospital employs 3,862 staff, including 735 doctors, 2,402 nursing staff and 725 allied health practitioners. TPCH has 690 beds and provides around 420,000 episodes of care each year to patients in Queensland and northern New South Wales.

The Prince Charles Hospital is a major training site for Queensland doctors, offering medical internship and training pathways in medicine and medical subspecialties, surgery, anaesthetics, intensive care, emergency medicine, radiology, psychiatry, pathology, general practice, rehabilitation, and medical administration. The University of Queensland Medical School's Northside Clinic Unit is situated within the hospital and provides teaching and clinical placement opportunities for medical students across its various healthcare services. It also houses the Queensland University of Technology's Mechanical and Biological Engineering Facility.

The hospital is actively involved in medical research with numerous national and international research trials and projects. Within Australia, TPCH has established research partnerships with The University of Queensland, Queensland University of Technology, The Australian Catholic University and the QIMR Berghofer Medical Research Institute. Internationally, top partnerships with the hospital in terms of research output include The University of Edinburgh, Johns Hopkins University, and Harvard University.

== History ==
The Brisbane Chest Hospital was opened in 1954 for the treatment of tuberculosis (TB). Due to the success of prevention and treatment of tuberculosis, the hospital had space to treat a wider variety of patients and was renamed The Chermside Hospital in 1961 to reflect its more general healthcare role.

The then-Prince Charles visited Brisbane in 1974 and the hospital was renamed The Prince Charles Hospital in his honour.

In 2007, a major upgrade of the hospital was completed and general medical and general surgical services have been introduced in a newly constructed building. The official opening ceremony was held the next day with the then Queensland Premier Peter Beattie as the chief guest. A new Intensive Care Unit and Emergency Department was also built.

With the rapid population growth of South East Queensland, The Prince Charles Hospital has become one of the busiest public hospitals in the state. In June 2023 Queensland Premier Annastacia Palaszczuk announced a $360 million expansion plan that will add 93 beds to the facility, a new emergency department, and satellite medical imaging, pharmacy and pathology services. The funding also provides for a $60 million boost to deliver two additional operating theatres and a new paediatric outpatient service with 16 treatment spaces at the hospital.

== Services ==
Hospital services include:

- Cardiac & thoracic medicine & surgery
- Emergency medicine - adults & children
- General medical & general surgical services
- Orthopaedic joint surgery (elective)
- Acute geriatrics & rehabilitative medicine
- Children's inpatient services
- Comprehensive & integrated mental health service
- Palliative Care

The Prince Charles Hospital is the premier cardiac service for the whole of Queensland and northern New South Wales with services in complex interventional cardiology, structural heart disease, cardiac electrophysiology and adult congenital heart disease. It is the home of one of Australia's cardiac imaging programs. The Queensland Heart Failure and Transplant Unit (QHFTU) and the Indigenous Cardiac Outreach Program (ICOP) are based at The Prince Charles Hospital.

There is an emphasis on teaching. It is also involved in conducting the FRACP clinical examinations which are held every year during July/August. The hospital's echocardiography department organises the Echo Australia conference which is held once a year and has developed techniques related to Numerical Modeling in Echocardiography such as EPLAR (the Echocardiographic Pulmonary to Left Atrial Ratio) and The Relative Atrial Index (RAI).

For children's health, the hospital offers a paediatric emergency department, a short-stay paediatric unit, and some paediatric outpatient services.
