= Jayant Patel =

Indian-born former surgeon and fraudster (born 1950)

- Born: Jayant Mukundray Patel; April 10, 1950 (age 76); Jamnagar, Gujarat, India
- Citizenship: India; United States
- Education: M. P. Shah Medical College; University of Rochester Medical Center
- Occupation: Surgeon (former)
- Years active: 1980s–2005
- Criminal information
- Employer: Bundaberg Base Hospital
- Status: Released (suspended sentence)
- Convictions: 4 counts of fraud
- Criminal charges: Fraud; Manslaughter; Grievous bodily harm
- Penalty: Fraud – 2 years imprisonment (2013); Manslaughter – acquitted (2013); Grievous bodily harm – acquitted (2013)

Details
- States: Queensland, Australia; Oregon, U.S. New York, U.S.

Jayant Mukundray Patel (born April 10, 1950) is an Indian-American former surgeon and convicted fraudster. Patel was accused of gross negligence whilst working at Bundaberg Base Hospital in Queensland, Australia. Deaths of some of his patients led to widespread publicity in 2005. In June 2010, he was convicted of three counts of manslaughter and one case of grievous bodily harm, and sentenced to seven years' imprisonment.

In August 2012, all convictions were quashed by the full bench of the High Court of Australia and a retrial was ordered due to "highly emotive and prejudicial evidence that was irrelevant to the case" laid before the jury. A retrial for one of the manslaughter counts resulted in acquittal and led to a plea deal where Patel pleaded guilty to fraud and the remaining charges were dropped. On May 15, 2015, he was barred from practising medicine in Australia.

== Early life and education ==
Jayant Patel was born in Jamnagar, Gujarat, India. Initially, he studied surgery at the M. P. Shah Medical College at the Saurashtra University, obtaining a master's degree. He moved to the US, receiving further surgical training at the University of Rochester School of Medicine as a surgical intern and a resident in surgery. He later became a US citizen.

== Career ==
=== Buffalo, New York, US ===
In 1984 in Buffalo, New York, health officials cited Patel for failing to examine patients before surgery. He was fined US$5,000 and was placed on three years' clinical probation. In April 2001, New York State health officials withdrew Patel's license.

=== Portland, Oregon, US ===
In 1989, Patel moved to the Kaiser Permanente Hospital in Portland, Oregon. In 1995, the hospital named him a "Distinguished Physician of the Year." By this time, Patel had been involved in a string of problem cases, eight of which had prompted or would later lead to malpractice or wrongful death lawsuits. Medical staff allege he performed surgery when not rostered to work, operated on other surgeons' patients, operated unnecessarily and caused serious injury and death. In 1998, Kaiser Permanente restricted Patel's practice; he was instructed not to operate on the liver or pancreas and to seek second opinions before performing other surgeries. In September 2000, after reviewing four cases involving the deaths of three patients, the Oregon Board of Medical Examiners made Patel's restriction statewide. Even though his medical license had been restricted, Patel still received glowing letters of recommendation from his colleagues at Kaiser Permanente.

=== Bundaberg, Queensland, Australia ===
In 2003, Patel moved to the position of Director of Surgery at the Bundaberg Base Hospital, where he was employed by Queensland Health under an "area of need" program where overseas-trained doctors are employed in predominantly regional understaffed areas. He was appointed despite having no specialist surgical qualifications.

== Practice in Bundaberg ==
Inadequacies in Patel's practice were identified. His surgery was described as "antiquated" and "sloppy". Nurses claimed they hid their patients from him when they knew he was in the hospital, doing rounds of the wards in search of people to operate upon. He showed poor regard for hygiene. He attracted the nickname "Dr. Death". It is alleged he altered medical records, including death certificates, to hide his inadequacies. Patel is linked to at least 87 deaths among the 1,202 patients he treated between 2003 and early 2005. Thirty patients died while under his care in Bundaberg.

On March 22, 2005, Stuart Copeland, the Queensland Shadow Minister for Health, raised the issue of Patel's clinical practice during question time in Queensland Parliament on behalf of Rob Messenger, the National Party MP for Burnett. Messenger had been alerted to Patel's inadequacies by Toni Hoffman, a nurse at the Bundaberg Base Hospital. Two days later, Messenger delivered a speech in the Legislative Assembly and called for Patel's suspension. After the Brisbane Courier-Mail published reports about Patel by journalist Hedley Thomas, the newspaper and other media outlets were flooded with claims of patients' injury or death caused by Patel's operations.

On April 2, 2005, Patel departed Australia for Portland using a business-class airfare paid for by Queensland Health. His passport had not been withheld.

On November 22, 2006, a magistrate issued a warrant for Patel's arrest and extradition to Australia. He was charged with three charges of manslaughter, five charges of causing grievous bodily harm, four of negligent acts causing harm and eight charges of fraud. He was extradited to Australia on July 21, 2008.

== Inquiries ==
=== Morris Inquiry ===
In response to public discontent over Patel's performance at Bundaberg Base Hospital, the Beattie government convened the Bundaberg Hospital Commission of Inquiry. The Inquiry held similar judicial powers to a Royal Commission. It commenced hearings in Brisbane led by Anthony Morris, a Queen's Counsel, on May 23, 2005.

On June 10, Morris released an interim report that was tabled on the same day in State Parliament by Premier Peter Beattie. The report recommended, among other things, that Patel be charged with murder or manslaughter in respect to one patient, with causing "a negligent act causing harm" to another patient, that he also be charged with fraud in relation to his registration at the Medical Board of Queensland to practise medicine and that extradition proceedings should begin. It also recommended changes to the Medical Practitioners Registration Act 2001.

At Morris Inquiry hearings in Bundaberg starting on June 20, nurses, local Queensland Health administrators and former patients of Patel were all expected to give evidence. Public hearings in Bundaberg concluded on July 14. The Inquiry resumed public hearings in Brisbane on July 25 and also sat in Townsville from August 2 to 4.

During the course of the Morris Inquiry, two senior Queensland Health bureaucrats in the Bundaberg region, Darren Keating and Peter Leck, filed an application in the Supreme Court of Queensland calling for the inquiry to be shut down, alleging that Morris had shown apprehended bias against them. On September 1, Justice Martin Moynihan of the Supreme Court of Queensland ruled in favor of the applicants, finding that the Commission of Inquiry was contaminated with ostensible bias against Keating and Leck, and that evidence gathered from other witnesses was entangled with the evidence given by Keating and Leck.

=== Davies Inquiry ===
A new inquiry began on September 8, 2005, and was headed by former Supreme Court of Queensland judge Justice Geoffrey Davies QC. This inquiry, the Queensland Public Hospitals Commission of Inquiry, was widely known as the Davies Inquiry.

The report of the Davies Inquiry was handed down on November 30, 2005. It recommended that charges of manslaughter and other criminal offences be prosecuted against Patel. The report also apportioned much of the blame to two former Health Ministers, Gordon Nuttall and Wendy Edmond, as well as senior Queensland Health bureaucrats for allowing the existence of an organisational culture of secrecy and ostracising of whistleblowers that allowed Patel's misdeeds to go unpunished for two years.

Peter Woodruff, an independent surgeon, was asked by Justice Davies to examine Patel's work. Woodruff believes that Patel negligently caused 13 deaths and serious complications suffered by at least 31 other patients.

=== Forster Inquiry ===
The Forster Inquiry, also known as the Queensland Health Systems Review, was commissioned by the Queensland Government on April 16, 2005, as a non-judicial inquiry specifically due to the political and public sentiments following the practices of Patel at Bundaberg Hospital with a broader focus on the practices, systems and processes of Queensland Health. Its report was issued in September 2005.

=== Aftermath ===
The Beattie government's handling of the crisis was received poorly by locals. As a result, voters were expected to punish the Labor government. At the 2006 state election, the once safe Labor seat of Bundaberg was narrowly won on preferences by National candidate Jack Dempsey, defeating Labor candidate Sonja Cleary. The Nationals won the seat with a two-party-preferred swing of 6.3%, which was largely attributed to the scandal and related inquiries, as well as the retirement of incumbent Labor member Nita Cunningham.

== Legal proceedings ==
=== Extradition ===
Patel was arrested in Portland, Oregon, on March 11, 2008, by FBI agents. He appeared in court that day with a court-appointed attorney, telling Federal Magistrate Dennis Hubel that he was unable to afford a lawyer, after incurring significant pre-trial legal fees. In response, the Magistrate ordered Patel, who lived in a $900,000 house, to fill out a financial affidavit before an upcoming detention hearing. Following his arrest, Toni Hoffman, the nurse who took her complaints about Patel to a member of the Parliament of Australia, said that "I am relieved he's been arrested, but there's still a lot to go." Patel denied the allegations. The extradition proceeding against Patel began in April 2008. Patel was denied bail by Judge Hebel on June 28, 2008, with the judge warning Australian and US authorities that they must extradite Patel by July 21, 2008, or he would release Patel on bail.

Patel was extradited: U.S. Marshals handed Patel over to two officers from the Queensland Police Service at Los Angeles International Airport on July 19, who then escorted him onboard Qantas flight QF 176. The flight arrived at Brisbane Airport on the morning of July 21. Patel was taken immediately to the Brisbane watch-house and was granted bail by the Roma Street Magistrates Court the same day.

=== Trial ===
Patel was tried in the Queensland Supreme Court for the unlawful killing of three patients and grievous bodily harm to a fourth. He pleaded not guilty to all charges.

On June 29, 2010, Jayant Patel was found guilty of all four charges. On July 1, he was sentenced to seven years in jail for his offences. Patel appealed his conviction and sentence to the Court of Appeal and the prosecution also appealed sentence. Both appeals were dismissed.

==== Appeal to High Court ====
Patel then appealed the Court of Appeal's decision to the High Court of Australia and was granted special leave to appeal. On August 24, 2012, the High Court unanimously allowed the appeal and quashed Patel's convictions on the ground that prejudicial evidence had likely influenced the jury. Patel argued that by the time prosecutors admitted, 43 days into the trial, that they could not prove Patel was guilty of incompetence, the jury had already heard testimony and evidence about his unusual behavior. The High Court granted Patel a new trial.

==== Retrial ====
The following year, a retrial was held for one of the manslaughter charges, and Patel was acquitted by the jury. This resulted in calls to have the remaining charges against Patel dropped. The remaining manslaughter and grievous bodily harm charges were later dropped in exchange for Patel pleading guilty to two counts related to him dishonestly gaining registration and two counts related to dishonestly gaining employment in Queensland. Patel was sentenced to a two-year suspended sentence for those fraud charges.

== Aftermath ==
In a television documentary on the case aired by CNN in November 2010 as part of its "World's Untold Stories" series and entitled "They Called Him 'Dr. Death'", several of Patel's medical co-workers in Australia testified to having repeatedly blown a whistle on him, only to be ignored by medical superiors and other authorities. Questions were also raised about the lack of due diligence by those involved in his appointment.

In response to the case, Peter Beattie fired the Director General, Robert Stable and changes were made to funding, the operations of the medical board, and the procedures for handling concerns raised by whistle blowers.

On May 15, 2015, the Queensland Civil and Administrative Tribunal banned Patel from ever practising medicine in Australia again. The tribunal upheld the Australian Health Practitioner Regulation Agency's contentions that Patel deceived authorities into granting him a medical licence, concealed matters related to his fitness to be a doctor, and performed surgeries that he knew he could not competently perform.

== In popular culture ==
Journalist Hedley Thomas (in collaboration with The Australian) released a true crime podcast about Patel called Sick to death released in 2025. The podcast is based on Thomas's book of the same title and took two years to produce.

== See also ==
- Christopher Duntsch
- Harold Shipman
- Ben Geen
