= Office of the Health Ombudsman =

Health regulator in Queensland, Australia

Agency overview
- Formed: 19 December 2013 (Legislated); 1 July 2014 (Operational)
- Jurisdiction: Queensland Government
- Employees: 152 (2023–24)
- Annual budget: A$29 million (2023–24)
- Agency executive: Lynne Coulson Barr, Health Ombudsman
- Key document: Health Ombudsman Act 2013
- Website: oho.qld.gov.au

The Office of the Health Ombudsman (OHO) is an independent agency of the Queensland Government responsible for investigating complaints against registered health practitioners and other health care workers in Queensland, Australia. While 16 health professions are regulated nationally, the OHO regulates all health workers and health organisations in Queensland with the purpose of protecting the public. The OHO works in a co-regulatory model with the Australian Health Practitioner Regulation Agency (Ahpra); the former manages all complaints in Queensland, while the latter manages the national registration of health practitioners.

While the nationally regulated health professions have their own profession-specific Codes of Conduct issued through relevant National Boards, all other Queensland health care workers are required to comply with the National Code of Conduct for Health Care Workers (Queensland). The OHO investigates complaints against registered health practitioners against their respective Codes of Conduct, and all other health care workers against the National Code.

== History and powers ==
The Office of the Health Ombudsman was created through the Health Ombudsman Act 2013, which confers relates powers to the Ombudsman to perform investigations and make regulatory decisions in regards to health workers and organisations. The Ombudsman is accountable to the Queensland Parliament through a parliamentary committee, and some decisions made by the Ombudsman are subject to review by the Queensland Civil and Administrative Tribunal.

== Notable investigations ==
Following a number of adverse outcomes at the maternity unit of Redcliffe Hospital, a Queensland Health hospital north of Brisbane, the OHO in November 2024 released an investigation report finding multiple women received inadequate ante- and post-natal care at the hospital between April 2021 and July 2022 following the unexpected deaths of multiple neonates. The investigation came after whistleblower Midwife Jackie Pulleine reported concerns about the standard of care to hospital management, and then to the Minister for Health and Ambulance Services, leading Metro North Health which operates the hospital to initiate an investigation. The OHO found that some hospital staff failed to properly monitor high-risk patients, did not administer prescribed treatments, and did not escalate or respond to deteriorating patients in a timely manner. The report attributed many of the deficits to insufficient nursing and midwifery staffing, delayed escalation of unwell patients to specialist doctors, and potential gaps in staff skills.

In May 2025, the OHO released a statement warning the general public about massage therapist, Mr David Zhen, and the company H2OMASSAGE, who they claim has been recommending dangerous and ineffective treatments and providing services that "could worsen patients' conditions or put them in serious risk of harm." In June 2024, the OHO placed an interim prohibition order on Mr Zhen, barring him from providing any health services to the public, after he was reported to the Ombudsman for discouraging patients from seeking conventional medical care for serious health conditions. The OHO warns against receiving any care from Zhen, and recommends that anyone who has previously received care contacts the Ombudsman and a medical practitioner. This warning is only the second time that the OHO has issued a public statement to protect the community.
