= Ethel Hanrahan =

Australian Army Nurse

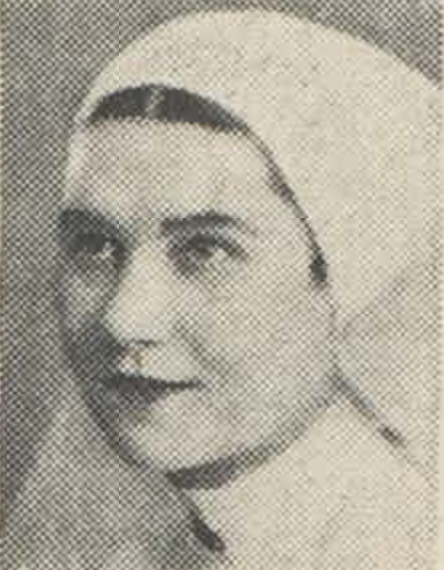
- Hanrahan in 1940 prior to embarking with 2nd AIF
- Born: 6 May 1909; Longreach, Queensland
- Died: 17 August 1981 (aged 72); Southport, Queensland
- Military career
- Allegiance: Australian
- Branch: Second Australian Imperial Force
- Service years: 1939–1947
- Rank: Lieutenant Colonel
- Nickname: "Billie"
- Service number: QX6107
- Unit: Australian Army Nursing Service
- Conflicts: Second World War
- Awards: Officer of the Order of the British Empire; Mentioned in Despatches (2)

Lieutenant Colonel Ethel Frances Hanrahan, OBE (6 May 1909 – 17 August 1981) was an Australian Army nurse who served in England and the Middle East during the Second World War. For her services in the Middle East, she was mentioned in despatches twice for gallant and distinguished services. In February 1947, she was appointed the first matron at the Repatriation General Hospital, Heidelberg.

== Early life ==
Ethel Frances Hanrahan was born on 6 May 1909 at Longreach, Queensland, the eldest child of four children to John Joseph Hanrahan, police sergeant, and his wife Ethel Frances (née Baker). She attended Banana State School in 1917, and St Ursula’s Convent, Yeppoon from 1920 to 1926 where she excelled in music and was first violin in the school's orchestra in 1926. Initially completing commercial courses in typing, she later trained as a nurse at Brisbane General Hospital from 1930 to 1934. She worked as a nursing sister at Rosemount Hospital from 1935 to 1939.

== Second World War ==
On 15 December 1939, Hanrahan enlisted in the Second Australian Imperial Force and joined the Australian Army Nursing Service in Brisbane as a nursing sister. She was one of 19 Queensland nurses that embarked with the 2/3rd General Hospital on 8 May 1940 from Sydney, arriving in Gourock, Scotland on 23 July 1940. Whilst in the United Kingdom, she served at the 2/3rd Field Ambulance and 2/3rd General Hospital.

Hanrahan served in the Middle East with the 2/2nd Australian General Hospital at Kantara, Egypt, from December 1940 to February 1942. She was twice mentioned in despatches. On her return from the Middle East in 1942, she served as matron within 107th, 116th and 117th Australian General Hospitals over the next three years. She was promoted to major in March 1943 and then to lieutenant colonel in September 1945 with her final appointment as matron of the 112th Australian General Hospital, Greenslopes, Brisbane, from October 1945 to January 1947.

== Later life ==
In February 1947, Hanrahan was appointed the first matron at the Repatriation General Hospital, Heidelberg, where she was affectionately known as "Billie". The Australian Centre for the Moving Image has footage of Hanrahan escorting Prince Philip during the Royal Visit of the Hospital in March 1954. She retired from the role of matron in May 1969.

On 25 February 1963, Hanrahan was appointed an Officer of the Order of the British Empire during an investiture ceremony by Queen Elizabeth II during the 1963 Australian Royal Visit. A hand coloured studio portrait of her taken in 1967 is located at The Australian War Memorial, Canberra. She died on 17 August 1981 and is buried at the Southport Lawn Cemetery.
