= Toni Hoffman =

Senior nurse

Toni Ellen Hoffman AM
- Born: 9 July 1957 (age 69); Sydney, Australia
- Education: Master's degree in bio-ethics
- Occupation: Nurse
- Employer: Queensland Health
- Known for: Exposing co-worker's malpractice, and patient advocacy

Toni Ellen Hoffman AM (born 9 July 1957) is a senior nurse who was made a Member of the Order of Australia and awarded the 2006 Australian of the Year Local Hero Award. She took on the role of whistleblower in informing Queensland politician Rob Messenger about Jayant Patel, a then-surgeon who was the subject of the Morris Inquiry and later the Davies Commission. She originally began to raise doubts about the ability of Patel with hospital management and other staff. Both doctors and surgeons who were familiar with his work had also been deeply concerned.

== Education ==
She spent time in London studying midwifery and intensive care. Hoffman received a master's degree in bio-ethics in 2002.

== Allegations against Patel ==
Hoffman was the head nurse at Bundaberg Base Hospital's intensive care unit. It was alleged that between 2003 and 2005 a number of patients who were not directly under Patel's care were being treated and even operated on by him when no procedure was necessary. Hoffman was concerned with the number of patients treated by Patel who had serious complications. The failure of her concerns to be investigated more thoroughly may have been the cause of a number of patient deaths. The lack of support and even deterrence from her colleagues make her actions all the more meritorious.

== Inquiry findings ==
An inquiry into the matter known as the Morris Inquiry was started but was terminated on the grounds of perceived bias. A second inquiry known as the Davies Inquiry found that the Queensland Health district manager and the hospital's Director of Medical Services had mostly ignored more than 20 complaints regarding Patel.

The Queensland Public Hospitals Commission of Inquiry says, in 3.427 (i):

Until early January 2005, Dr Keating repeatedly advised Mr Leck that Ms Hoffman's complaints were unjustified and largely personality driven when he should have appreciated (particularly in the context of other complaints) that they raised genuine and concerning medical issues.

The fact that Patel worked extremely long hours and was performing a huge number of procedures was seen to be a good thing by hospital management; he was even awarded employee of the month at one point. Hoffman faced ridicule for suggesting that his presence was not beneficial and as a last resort chose to bring the matter into the public arena by approaching local MP Rob Messenger.

She is commended in the Commission of Inquiry in paragraph 3.432:

I would also like to pay tribute to certain people whose care, passion or courage was instrumental in bringing to light the matters covered here. First and foremost of those is Ms Hoffman. She might easily have doubted herself, or succumbed to certain pressures to work within a system that was not responsive. She might have chosen to quarantine herself from Dr Patel's influence by leaving the Base or at least the Intensive Care Unit. Instead, and under the threat of significant detriment to herself, Ms Hoffman persistently and carefully documented the transgressions of Dr Patel. I would also pay tribute to Mr Messenger, the Member for Burnett. He provided a voice for staff concerns when no others seemed to exist and, although it has not been the subject of this report, he was forced, in the course of so doing, to endure animosity from a number of quarters.

Messenger too was criticised for his stand until Courier-Mail journalist Hedley Thomas did a Google search on Jayant Patel and found that he had faced disciplinary action for negligence in the United States.

On 1 July 2010, Patel was sentenced to seven years' jail after he was found guilty of three charges of manslaughter and one count of grievous bodily harm. Then in August 2012, all convictions were quashed by the full bench of the High Court of Australia and a retrial was ordered due to "highly emotive and prejudicial evidence that was irrelevant to the case" laid before the jury. A retrial for one of the manslaughter counts resulted in acquittal and led to a plea deal where Patel pleaded guilty to fraud and the remaining charges were dropped. On 15 May 2015, he was barred from practising medicine in Australia.

== Awards ==
Hoffman was appointed a Member of the Order of Australia for her exposure of Jayant Patel. She also received the 2006 Local Hero Award.

== Personal toll ==
While Hoffman has no regrets for advocating on behalf of patients, she was undermined and ridiculed by staff who resented her whistleblower actions. She took legal action against Queensland Health for gross negligence in failing to care for her, particularly denying her specialised counselling. In early March 2012, she was awarded compensation in a private settlement.
