= Rosemount Hospital =

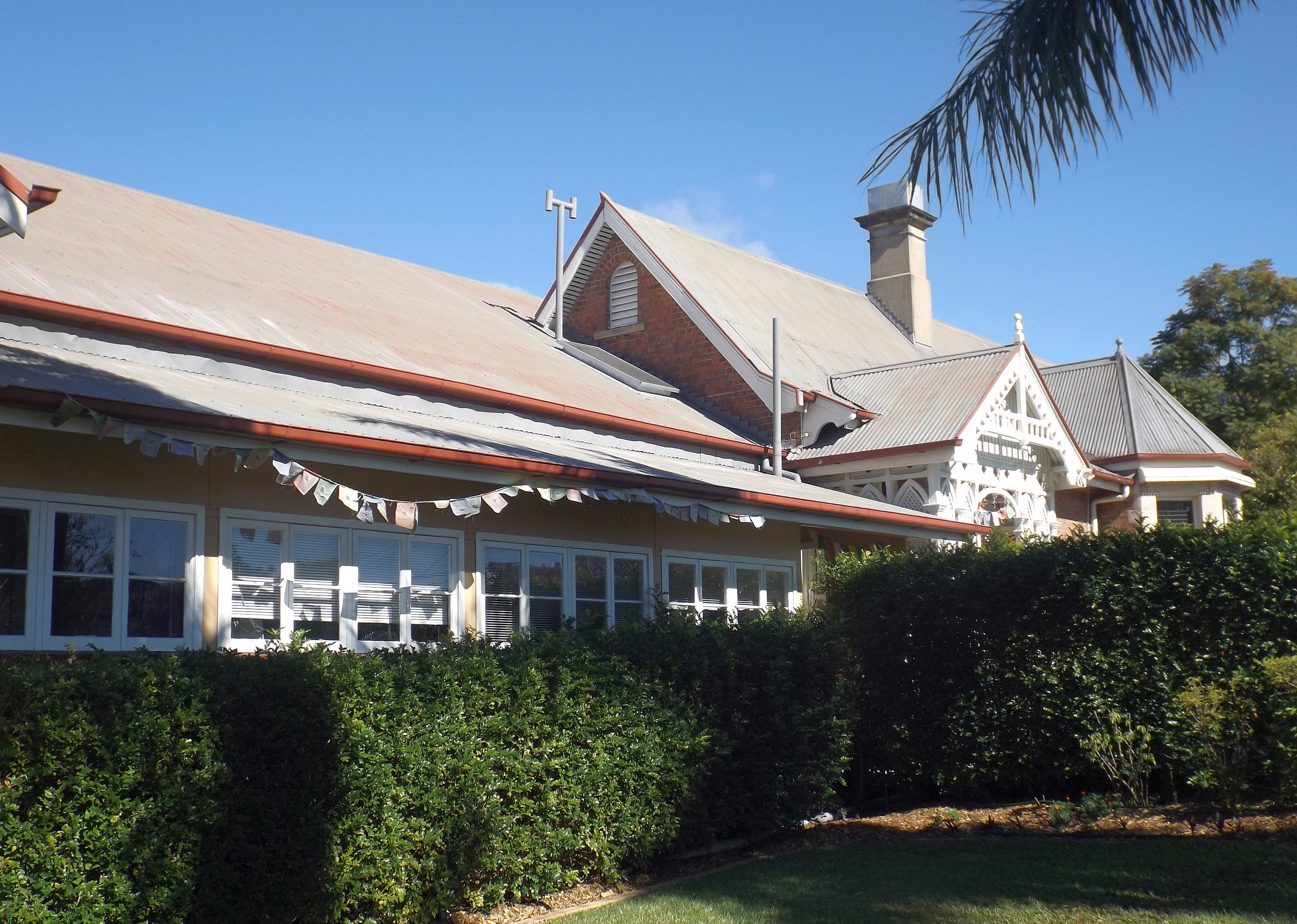
- Building in 2015

- Location within Queensland Location within Australia
- 27.4383°S 153.0323°E
- Location: 189 Lutwyche Road, Windsor, Queensland, Australia

History
- Design period: 1840s–1860s (mid-19th century)
- Built: 1850s–1940s
- Built for: Queensland Government

Site notes
- Owner: Metro North Health

Queensland Heritage Register
- Official name: Rosemount Hospital, Rosemount, Rosemount Military Hospital, Rosemount Repatriation General Hospital
- Type: state heritage (built, landscape)
- Designated: 24 September 1999
- Reference no.: 602145
- Significant period: 1880s–1940s (fabric, historical); 1910s– (social)
- Significant components: pathway/walkway, kitchen/kitchen house, wall/s – retaining, morgue, residential accommodation – main house, residential accommodation – nurses' quarters, theatre – operating, pavilion, ward – block, toilet block/earth closet/water closet, garden/grounds, residential accommodation – doctor's house/quarters, hut/shack, trees/plantings, ward – open air, residential accommodation – matron's house/quarters

Rosemount Hospital is a heritage-listed public hospital and health precinct in the suburb of Windsor in Brisbane, Queensland, Australia. Rosemount Hospital is co-located on the broader but synonymous Rosemount Campus, which houses a number of community health services provided by Metro North Health, the local health district within Queensland Health. It is also known as Rosemount, Rosemount Military Hospital, and Rosemount Repatriation General Hospital. It was built between the 1850s and 1940s, and was added to the Queensland Heritage Register on 24 September 1999.

== History ==
The former residence of Rosemount and its grounds on Lutwyche Road at Windsor have served several different functions over more than a century. Originally a home to several notable Brisbane identities, the site was transformed into a military hospital during World War I and has also served as a repatriation hospital, psychiatric facility and as a centre for rehabilitation.

Allotment 13 on which the original Rosemount residence was built was granted to Charles Windmell in March 1855. Daniel Rowntree Somerset purchased this allotment (and allotments 11 and 12) in August 1855 and built a lofty house of stone containing drawing room, dining room, four bedrooms and hall with marble chimney pieces, enriched cornices and centres which he offered for sale in 1858–59. The property on 77 acres, also included a detached kitchen built of stone containing a pantry store room and two servant's rooms; a coach house and stable built of hardwood slabs and an acre of garden well stocked with flowers, shrubs and fruit trees. The property was first leased and then purchased in July 1865 by Maurice Charles O'Connell. O'Connell and his wife Eliza Emmaline came to Brisbane in 1860 after a six-year term as Government Resident at Port Curtis (now Gladstone). He was a grandson of Governor William Bligh, and was very prominent in the affairs of the colony of New South Wales. He was a founding member of the Queensland Legislative Council and its president until 1879. A highly respected and involved public figure, O'Connell was appointed Administrator of the Colony in the absence of the Governor on four occasions. A locality in Windsor was named O'Connelltown in his family's honour and Le Geyt Street was named after Lady O'Connell's maiden name.

O'Connell immediately began subdividing and selling allotments 11 and 12 as smaller building sites. He took out three mortgages of £1500 in July 1865, £605 in August and £367/5 in September 1866 on Allotment 13. It is not certain what he did with the loans but in 1872, O'Connell lost the property comprising the house and 24 acres 36 perches to Mary Jones after she exercised her power of sale when the O'Connells defaulted on repaying the £1500 loan. Jones transferred the property to Francis Sophia Jones, wife of the Reverend Thomas Jones of All Saints Anglican Church, Wickham Terrace and the property was then offered for sale or to let in May 1872. The description of the house at this time closely matches that when the house was sold by Somerset, suggesting that no major construction work had been undertaken. The property was described as being built of stone, consisting of six rooms with detached kitchen, storeroom and larder. There were also wooden stables, with stalls for five horses, coach house and loft and a room for a groom. The grounds surrounding this residence comprised about 22 acres including flower and kitchen garden, a cultivation paddock of five acres and a pasture for five or six cows.

Maurice Lyons, solicitor, leased the property in October 1872 for a term of three years and continued the lease after the property was purchased by his wife, Matilda in September 1873. Lyons kept racehorses and nearby Lyons Parade and Lyons Terrace are named after the family.

In February 1880, stock and station agent, James Hamilton Scott purchased the house on 6 acres 4 perches and soon after nominated Henry Vyvyan Hassell and Samuel McGregor as trustees for purposes unidentified. The remainder of allotment 13 was offered for sale as Rosemount Estate by Lyons, subdivided into 90 "villa sites".

Trustees, Hassell and McGregor took out a mortgage for £1,500 from Richard Cruise in December 1882 and Scott appears in the Post Office Directories for 1883–84 as residing at Rosemount. Scott may have been responsible for the additional stone house that was believed to have been added to the original building and connected by a timber walkway.

In 1885, the property was purchased by Alfred Jones, the manager and one of the founders of the firm, Gordon and Gotch. It is believed that the original stone house began to fail and Jones demolished and replaced it with the brick wing and porch to form one long residence. Jones is also believed to have added the look-out across the eastern verandah of the building accessed by a spiral stair. The design of the brick addition has been attributed to prominent architect George Henry Male Addison.

In 1901, Jones purchased an adjoining 2 acres, 1 rood 34 perches, a subdivision of allotment 14. Alfred Jones resided at Rosemount until his death in 1912 when the property was inherited by his sons, Sydney William and Herbert Alfred. The following year, the sons left the house to live in Ascot.

The property was lent to the military authorities for the term of World War I and was not formally acquired from the Jones' family until 1926 along with an additional 1-acre 1 rood 27 perches in the southwest corner. Rosemount was initially used as a hospital for massage and ionisation cases but the existing buildings soon proved to be insufficient for the increasing number of soldiers requiring hospital care. In 1916, eight open air style wards with semi-detached general areas and bathrooms and central kitchen area were constructed in the grounds between the house and Breakfast Creek by the Department of Home Affairs. Existing outbuildings such as the coach house, laundry and stables were adapted for use as orderlies' quarters and for other auxiliary uses.

Construction on a second phase of buildings commenced in December 1918 and was substantially complete by the end of 1919 at which time the hospital complex comprised a total of 13 wards, five huts, a dining hall and kitchen, theatre block, two buildings for staff quarters, sisters quarters, administration block, massage block, stores, dispensary, curative metal workshop, curative boot repairing workshops, boiler house, mortuary, motor shed, oil shed, dental buildings, eight fire boxes and a gymnasium.

The design of the new wards was adapted from the standard pavilion plan of the time and like the open air wards were designed to provide for the maximum circulation of fresh air. Patients were ideally situated in close proximity to a door or window without the distinct disadvantages of having no walls, particularly in winter months and with the opportunity of respite on open verandahs.

Initial plans provided 10-foot (3.0 m) verandahs to enable patients to sleep out and to increase accommodation in the wards. The Chairman of the Board argued that patients everywhere prefer sleeping on the verandah and it was thought that this would especially be the case in Queensland. However, the Principal Medical Officer disagreed with this deviation from the standard design and insisted that the five wards be constructed with standard 5-foot (1.5 m) verandahs.

A compromise was reached and the five identical timber pavilion plan single storey wards elevated on timber stumps with corrugated iron roof and ventilated ridge, measuring 80 by 17 feet (24.4 by 5.2 m), were erected with 8-foot (2.4 m) verandahs. Each ward included a dormitory, two cubicles, a Sister's office, servery and an annexe sterilizer room and self-contained ablutions block at the southern end. The ward buildings were stepped down the gentle east facing slope and were connected by a timber framed walkway with corrugated iron roof. Wards 1 and 2 were constructed as a 20 and 22 bed ward respectively. Wards 3, 4 and 5 were 30 bed wards. In April 1921 Rosemount Hospital was taken over by the Department of Repatriation from the Department of Defence. The Repatriation Department immediately began a building program which included the erection of a new residence for the medical officers at a cost of £950, alterations and conversion of the Administration block to nurses quarters and single officers quarters. A detached room was constructed for sterilising which adjoined the existing scientific block. The Dental hut was altered for research work and the tinsmith's shop became a pharmacy. Alterations were made to the existing mortuary and a hut was altered for office accommodation.

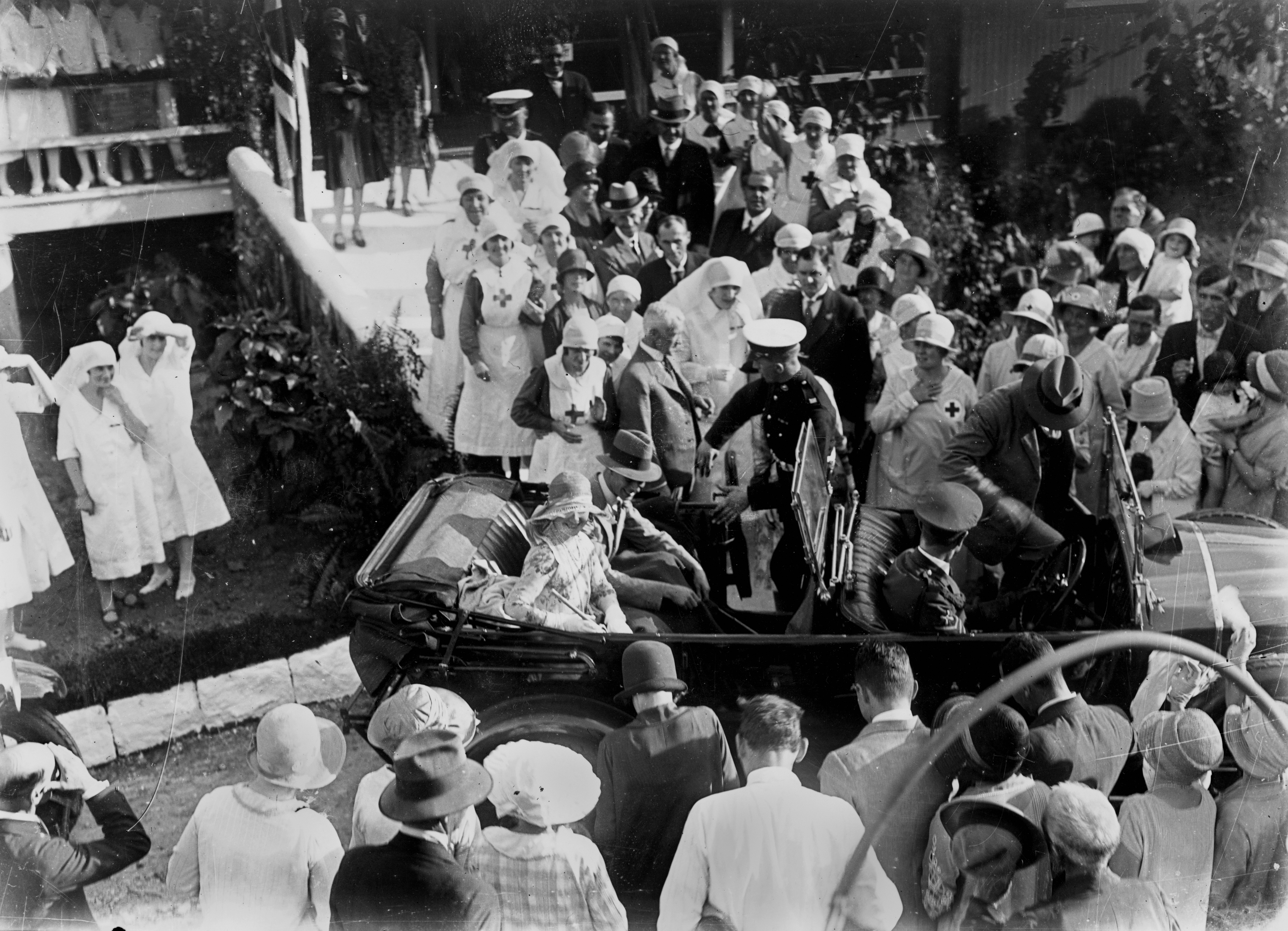
Duke and Duchess of York spend an afternoon with sick and invalid Diggers, 1927

In April 1927, the Duke and Duchess of York made a royal visit to Australia. As part of their visit to Brisbane, they visited the Rosemount Hospital where they met with each of the invalid servicemen in the hospital.

Alterations were made to the administration building to provide office accommodation for the medical superintendent and an out-patients department. The Red Cross Buildings were altered as accommodation for the resident Medical Officer and pharmacist and a lavatory and bathroom were added. A lavatory was moved 15 feet (4.6 m) from the front gate to the right, to provide a gate-keeper's cottage. The dental hut was converted to be used for pathological examinations. The 1916 open air wards and associated outbuildings were demolished prior to 1935.

In December 1939, approval was granted for the construction of new wards by the Department of the Interior, for the accommodation of service personnel. The construction of similar wards in Sydney and Melbourne were also approved. In February 1940, the Major General reported that while there were a small number of army patients at Rosemount it was expected that the numbers would increase before June with the establishment of larger Militia Camps and the involvement of the Australian personnel in the Middle East.

Plans were prepared by the Department of Works after consultation with the Departments of Repatriation and Defence. Initially thirty beds were to be provided but with the escalation of the war, this requirement was increased to a total of 82 beds available for defence patients. To cope with the extra patients and resultant staff increase, additions were also made to the kitchen and boiler house, nurses quarters, orderlies and maids changing rooms and stores.

Following World War 2, the Department of Repatriation rationalised and reorganised its facilities for service personnel. The Greenslopes Repatriation Hospital became the principal acute care facility and as a consequence the Rosemount complex was transferred to the Brisbane and South Coast Hospitals Board in the late 1970s. The Board was experiencing major problems with overcrowding and the Rosemount site was used to alleviate some of those difficulties and was used for a variety of purposes, principally the care of long term patients. Minimal improvements were made at Rosemount as the Board's capital funds were needed for the expansion on the Herston site. In 1951, over three acres on the banks of Breakfast Creek was sold to the Brisbane City Council and is presently open space used as parkland.

In the 1980s the Rosemount site was used as a psychiatric facility for the nearby Royal Brisbane Hospital. During this period the operating theatre was used to administer electroconvulsant therapy (ECT or 'electric shock treatment'). The adjacent Ward 6 functioned as an intensive care unit, Ward 7 was the lock ward and the former nurses quarters were used as accommodation for medical staff.

In the late 1980s a new two storey masonry complex to accommodate the geriatric services divisions was erected to the west of the Rosemount residence and part of this building is now used as a day hospital. This project necessitated the demolition of some the massage block, X-ray building, garage, male staff hut, workshop and stores.

In 1994 the Rosemount residence ceased to be used and, being left empty, was the target of vandalism. It was offered to the Karuna Hospice Service, which provides hospice care for the dying based on Buddhist principles. In 2003–4, Karuna restored the Rosemount residence and leased the property from Queensland Health for 30 years.

In 2015, the Rosemount complex remains part of the Royal Brisbane Hospital and fulfils a number of functions, mostly provided at the 1980s masonry building. These include: mental health services, community care, geriatric assessment and rehabilitation. Some of the buildings on the site are used for ancillary services, while others are not in active use.

== Description ==
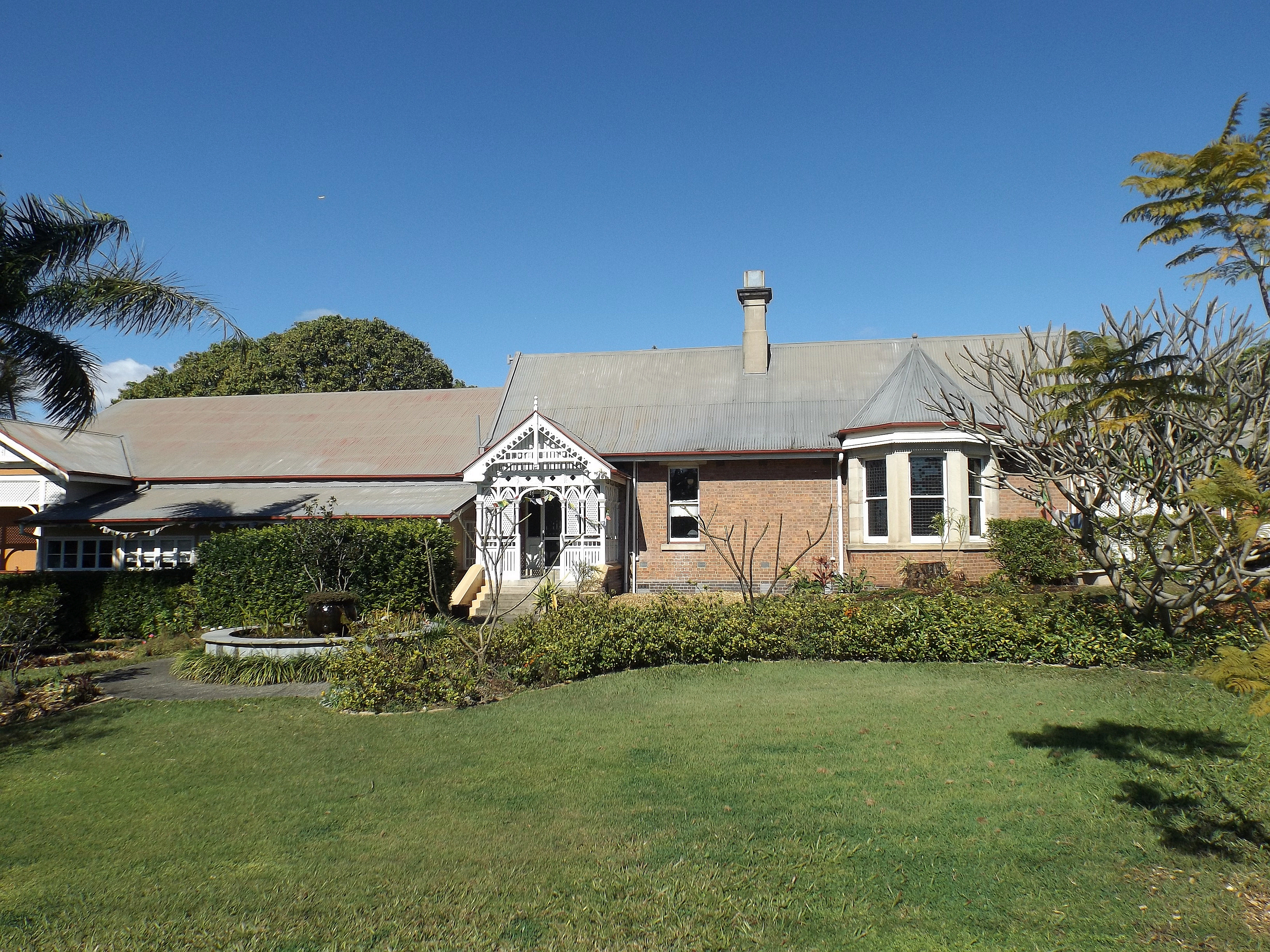
Building in 2015

Rosemount Hospital occupies 2.422 hectare site on an east facing slope overlooking Breakfast Creek at Windsor. It comprises a variety of buildings, structures and gardens and includes a former 1880s brick residence set amongst a collection of World War I, interwar and World War II timber wards and ancillary buildings and a recent masonry complex for geriatric patients.

The site is divided by the large two storey masonry complex constructed in the late 1980s. To the west are the former Medical Officer's Quarters facing Lutwyche Road, a single storey timber-framed building elevated on concrete stumps with a hipped corrugated iron roof and walls clad in pine chamfer boards. It contains two bedrooms, a kitchenette, lounge, entrance porch and verandah which has been enclosed. The building is presently unoccupied.

Also located on Lutwyche Road is the former dental hut, a single storey timber-framed building clad in timber chamferboards with a terracotta tile gambrel roof and finials. It is elevated on timber stumps and was converted to several different uses including an assistant officer's quarters and later as an orderlies' hut.

The remainder of the surviving buildings are located to the east of the masonry complex. Wards 1–5 are located within the southern portion of the site. Each has had stumps and roofing replaced, ventilated ridges removed and verandahs enclosed with casement windows and metal louvres. The interiors of the dormitory have been lined with fibrous cement sheeting . At the northern end of each of the wards an addition which may incorporate the frame of the early walkway has been lined externally with small timber chamferboards. A steel framed covered connecting walkway links the buildings. Ward 1 is now occupied by the GARU and Karuna. Part of Ward 2 is also occupied by Karuna. Wards 3 contains the Red Cross canteen and the University of Queensland have research units in part of Ward 3 and in Ward 4. Ward 5 is unoccupied.

Wards 6 and 7, constructed c. 1939, are single storey timber-framed buildings elevated on concrete stumps and beams with a fibro cement roof and walls lined in FAC board. They were built with 11-foot (3.4 m) wide verandahs to the north and south sides with canvas roller blinds which have been enclosed. Self-contained ablutions located in an annexe at the eastern end of each building have been altered. The buildings are highset at their eastern end and the subfloor area has been enclosed with fibrous cement sheeting. Ward 6 is presently used for storage of bulk medical stores and Ward 7 has been recently refurbished as offices for its present tenants, Home and Community Care (HACC). The interiors have been lined, some partitions installed and the building has been painted internally and externally.

The Matron's flat and household workers' quarters is a timber-framed building lined with tongue and grooved pine elevated on timber stumps. The verandahs are lined with fibrous cement sheeting to sill height with venetian blinds above. The Matron's flat, contained a verandah, office, bedroom, lounge, vestibule, front hall and bathroom. The Household workers' quarters contained a hallway, bedroom, sewing room, dining room, lounge, and back and side verandahs. All internal partition walls have been removed and the building was used as a kitchen until recently and is now unoccupied.

The Rosemount residence has a western wing constructed of English bond red facebrick relieved with stone sills and window dressings, multipaned leadlight windows and a dark facebrick base. It has a corrugated iron roof and bay windows to the north and to the west with battened and bracketed eaves and an elaborate timber entrance porch with seating to the north. The western bay window is protected by a narrow porch which provides entry to the semi detached kitchen. An early stone retaining wall frames the walkway at the end of the building.

The 1880s brick wing of the early Rosemount residence and the adjoining kitchen is of the same layout that appears on the 1916 plan and contained bedrooms, bathroom, large dining room, kitchen scullery, larder and cook's room. Timber detailing throughout is substantial and elaborate and includes ceilings, architraves, skirtings, dados, dining room mantel piece and door and window joinery. The dining room and hall have elaborate coffered ceilings and the floor to the halls has tessellated tiles. The lower level of the house to the east of the main hall was replaced sometime after World War I. This timber wing replaced a masonry portion in a similar configuration and early windows and doors have been incorporated into timber framed walls. The rear verandah and viewing platform was enclosed and roofed and the spiral stair removed. The posts, ripple iron ceiling and other details of the early verandah survive and have been clad with timber chamferboards and casement windows. The massage room was located on the eastern verandah, and an ionisation room and orthopaedic room were contained within the house during World War I. It was later adapted for use as the Sister's quarters.

The former Sisters' Quarters No 1 (day nurses quarters) is a single storey timber-framed building elevated on concrete stumps with pine chamfer board cladding and a corrugated iron gambrel roof. Its linear plan contains what were formerly thirteen bedrooms, an entrance lounge, hall and a bathroom and shower room opening off a central hall. The western end of the building is in contact with the ground and the walls and floor at this end of the building demonstrate some signs of failure, the extent of which is unknown. The building is presently unoccupied.

The Operating Theatre is a single storey timber-framed building lined with vertical tongue and groove pine boards and six-light sash and frame windows. It is elevated on concrete stumps and has a corrugated iron gable roof with ventilated ridge. Entry is gained via a series of ramps to a porch on the western elevation. A pair of six-light timber panel entrance doors with matching sidelights and fanlights provide the main entry to a large foyer with a staff entry to an office through a four panel timber door. The interior comprises a theatre, offices and ancillary spaces with floors and coved skirtings finished with terrazzo.

The former lavatory block is a timber-framed building with a concrete floor and corrugated iron gambrel roof. Its walls originally lined with tongue and grooved pine boards have been sheeted on the exterior with fibrous cement sheeting. The building is presently divided with a central timber partition and is unoccupied.

The former Recreation Hall is a single storey timber-framed building, lined with vertical tongue and groove pine boards and is elevated on concrete stumps with a corrugated iron gable roof. The roof structure incorporates iron tie rods below a coved timber boarded ceiling. Natural light and ventilation are provided by a combination of sash and frame windows divided by pairs of top hinged sashes to the east and west elevations. Entry to the building is gained at the southern end via a ramp or short flight of stairs and the building is connected to the eastern and southern wards by a timber framed covered walkway.

The former mortuary building is a simple single storey brick building with concrete floor and corrugated iron roof. Access to the interior was not available.

A highset single storey timber-framed building with corrugated iron roof in the north east corner of the site was formerly occupied by Indigenous Health. This building was removed to this location after 1966. Another highset single storey timber-framed building with corrugated iron roof lined in vertical tongue and groove boards with sash and frame windows was also removed to the south eastern corner of the site after 1966 and may have been relocated from somewhere within the hospital complex.

== Heritage listing ==
Rosemount Hospital was listed on the Queensland Heritage Register on 24 September 1999 having satisfied the following criteria.

The place is important in demonstrating the evolution or pattern of Queensland's history.

Rosemount Hospital is significant as a military hospital developed as a result of World War I. It demonstrates the development of facilities required to treat the extensive number of service personnel injured in World Wars I and II. The extent of war injuries is an aspect of the war that tends to be overshadowed by the number of fatalities as recognised by war memorials. These buildings are a testament to those who survived but nevertheless suffered as a result of the conflict.

It (former Rosemount residence) also demonstrates the type of residential development that occurred along the northern bank of Breakfast Creek from the 1860s and is important for its association with early European Settlers in this area. It is also significant for the evidence it provides of changing trends in psychiatric and general nursing and medical care.

The place demonstrates rare, uncommon or endangered aspects of Queensland's cultural heritage.

This is the only such facility surviving in Queensland and one of the few from this period in Australia.

The five timber ward buildings have added significance as a rare surviving example of a set of timber pavilion ward from World War I.

The place is important in demonstrating the principal characteristics of a particular class of cultural places.

The former Rosemount residence is significant as an example of an 1880s residence by prominent nineteenth century architect, G H M Addison, and has added significance for the intactness of its 1880s brick wing including the interior of its rooms.

Significant buildings include the former Rosemount residence, the Medical Officer's quarters, Dental Hut, the five timber pavilion wards constructed in 1918, the former lavatory building and operating theatre, the timber pavilion buildings constructed c. 1939, the former Matron's quarters, the Sister's Quarters, the former Red Cross Hut and the Morgue. Other significant features include the connecting walkways, stone retaining walls and mature trees.
