= Royal Australian College of General Practitioners =

Professional body for general practitioners in Australia

- Abbreviation: RACGP
- Formation: 1958
- Legal status: Registered charity
- Purpose: Education, training, standards and advocacy of GPs
- Headquarters: East Melbourne, Victoria
- Location: Australia
- Region served: Australia
- Members: 40,000
- President: Dr Michael Wright
- Staff: 420
- Website: www.racgp.org.au

The Royal Australian College of General Practitioners (RACGP) is the training college and professional association for general practitioners (GPs) in Australia. The RACGP is responsible for maintaining standards for quality clinical practice, education and training, and research in Australian general practice. The RACGP has over 50,000 members across Australia, including almost 30,000 Fellows and over 6,000 trainees.

The RACGP develops resources and guidelines, advocates for GPs on issues that affect their practice, and develop standards that general practices use to ensure high quality healthcare.

== Organisation ==
=== The President and Board ===
The RACGP is governed by the RACGP Board. The RACGP Broad comprises:

- Chair
- President
- Vice President
- Censor-in-Chief
- The Chair of each state/territory Council
- Chair of RACGP Rural
- Chair of RACGP Specific Interests
- Chair of RACGP Aboriginal and Torres Strait Islander Health
- Chair of the Finance Audit and Risk Management Committee
- General Practice Registrar Representative
- Any additional Board members co-opted by RACGP Board permitted under the RACGP Constitution.

=== Faculties ===
There are nine faculties within the RACGP, representing different geographical regions and special interest groups.

Six geographical faculties serve the needs of members practising in their respective regions; Western Australia, Victoria, Queensland, Tasmania, South Australia & Northern Territory and New South Wales & Australian Capital Territory.

RACGP Rural supports and advocates for GPs working in rural and remote communities across Australia.

RACGP Aboriginal and Torres Strait Islander Health was formed as part of the RACGP's commitment to raising awareness of Aboriginal and Torres Strait Islander health needs, and therefore to help 'close the gap'.

RACGP Specific Interests was established in 2008 to recognise the additional interest and expertise held by GPs in selected areas of general practice. RACGP Specific Interests facilitates GP members practising in these areas to promote the area of specific interest and to share and develop related knowledge and materials.

== Membership ==
The RACGP has more than 40,000 members working in or towards a career in general practice across Australia and internationally.

=== Categories of membership ===
The categories of membership are:

- Fellow – GPs who have successfully completed all RACGP Fellowship assessment requirements, have satisfied the RACGP Board of their competence through training and/or experience, and who hold a current Ahpra registration as a medical practitioner.
- Member – medical practitioners who have five years specialist registration with AHPRA, five years consecutive participation in the QI&CPD program and two referees, both of whom must be a financial Fellow or Member of the RACGP.
- Associate – registered medical practitioners who are not Fellows or 'full' Members.
- Registrar Associate – general practice registrars who are participating in general practice vocational training.
- Student – medical students who are currently enrolled in an undergraduate or graduate course approved by an Australian medical school, including a Bachelor of Medicine or a Bachelor of Biomedical Science.

== Fellowship and examinations ==
=== Fellowship of the RACGP ===
RACGP Fellowship is the admission to the specialty of general practice, and is required to receive specialist registration as a general practitioner with the Medical Board of Australia.

In 1996, the Australian Government adopted Fellowship of the RACGP (FRACGP) as the standard for certifying competence to deliver unsupervised general practice services in any general practice setting in Australia – urban, regional, rural or remote.

Fellowship of the RACGP allows GPs to:

- Work unsupervised in general practice
- Provide full Medicare rebates for services
- Use the post nominal 'FRACGP'

=== FRACGP exams ===
The RACGP Fellowship exam consists of three segments; applied knowledge test (AKT), key feature problems (KFP) and objective structured clinical exam (OSCE). The exams are delivered in various locations across Australia and the conjoint Fellowship is delivered in Hong Kong and Malaysia. Passing of each component of the RACGP Fellowship exam is the usual way GPs become eligible to apply for their FRACGP.

=== Practice Experience Program ===
The RACGP's Practice Experience Program (PEP) is a self-directed education program designed to support non-vocationally registered (non-VR) doctors on their pathway to RACGP Fellowship.

The PEP aims to provide targeted educational support for non-VR doctors (primarily international medical graduates ) to help them to prepare for the RACGP exams and to deliver quality general practice care to their patients.

== Continued Professional Development ==
=== CPD program ===
The RACGP Continued Professional Development (CPD) program supports Australian GPs to provide the best possible care for patients. It does this by recognising ongoing education and promoting the development and maintenance of general practice skills and lifelong learning.

Medicare requires all GPs who access any Medicare program or service to participate and complete all requirements of a recognised CPD program.

In the absence of fellowship of any of the specialty colleges, a GP will typically take up participation of the QI&CPD program in order to satisfy medical registration requirements with the Australian Health Practitioner Regulation Agency (AHPRA), the national medical registration body. Participation in the QI&CPD program is not equivalent to Fellowship of the RACGP.

== Advocacy ==
The RACGP advocates for GPs and general practice, promoting the importance of patient safety, quality care, coordination of care, whole patient care, better recognition and reward for GPs, and investment into primary healthcare infrastructure, teams, training, and technology. The breadth of the RACGP's work is reflected by its various advocacy efforts.

== Publications and events ==
=== Australian Journal of General Practice ===
The RACGP publishes the Australian Journal of General Practice (AJGP), Australia's only peer-reviewed scholarly journal for GPs. All articles are subject to a peer-review process before they are accepted for publication. The journal is indexed in MEDLINE, Index Medicus and Science Citation Index Expanded.

=== Standards ===
The RACGP has developed and published the Standards for general practice since July 1996. The current edition is the RACGP Standards for general practice (5th edition), which launched in October 2017.

The Australian Commission on Safety and Quality in Health Care administers the National General Practice Accreditation (NGPA) Scheme, which supports the consistent accreditation assessment of Australian general practices against the RACGP Standards for general practices.

=== newsGP ===
newsGP combines clinical articles directly relating to the treatment of patients with professional articles on policy, procedures or managing a practice. newsGP covers news from the RACGP, explaining position statements and advocacy efforts.

newsGP features articles, profiles and opinion pieces.

=== Guidelines and resources ===
The RACGP develops guidelines and resources on health issues and topics to support GPs and general practices in delivering patient care.

=== Events ===
Each year the RACGP holds an annual conference in a different location around Australia. The 2018 conference was held on the Gold Coast from 11–13 October under the theme General Practice: The centre of health in Australia and was attended by over 2000 delegates.

The RACGP annual conference is an opportunity for GPs and other healthcare professionals to discuss various educational themes, attend clinical workshops and research presentations, and network with one another to support their professional development.

The various faculties and departments of the RACGP host many educational and collegial events throughout the year, including fellowship ceremonies, awards nights, workshops and seminars.

== History of general practice in Australia and beyond ==
Prior to the mid 20th century, upon graduation Australian doctors spent time in general practice. A medical career usually included completing an intern year immediately after graduation as a resident in a major teaching hospital. After a period of time in general practice, some doctors would seek specialist qualifications. Possibly reflecting the historical origins of Australia as a series of British colonies, these doctors would travel overseas, most often to the UK, to specialise and then return to establish practice.

As the Australian population grew post World War II, the public hospital system also grew demanding an increasing number of specialists. Local training programs emerged and therefore the ability of a doctor to enter specialist training directly following the mandatory intern year post graduation without entering general practice. This increasing number of specialists made it increasingly difficult for general practitioners in Australia to hold and retain public hospital appointments, especially in procedural areas such as surgery or obstetrics.

This was not a uniquely Australian phenomenon. Worldwide, medical practice was shifting focus onto hospitals with the expansion of pharmaceuticals and medical and surgical interventions. In the United States, the number of doctors identifying as general practitioners fell markedly between 1931 and 1974 from 83% to 18%. This process began as specialisation increased prior to the War. US GPs increasingly felt that health care was becoming fragmented and weakening doctor patient relationships.

"There are 57 different varieties of specialist to diagnose and treat 57 different varieties of disease but no physician to take care of the patient."

=== Development of professional colleges ===
In 1950, an Australian Graduate, Dr Joseph Collings, conducted a review of general practice in the UK. This 30-page report was published in the Lancet in 1950.

"There are no real standards for general practice. What a doctor does and how he does it depends entirely on his own conscience" Dr Collings, 1950.

Dr Collings' report was scathing and generated immediate and heated interest. It was undoubtedly a key event in the definition of general practice as a "speciality."

He identified that general practice has no academic underpinning, no evidence upon which to base practice and no consistency of practice. The report did not pull punches. He described rural practice is "an anachronism", suburban practice is a "casualty-clearing" service and Inner city practice is "at best… very unsatisfactory and at worst a positive source of public danger".

There is a direct link between the public criticism of general practice and the move to create a College. Dr Rose and Dr Hunt in the BMJ 1950 write:

"There is a College of Physicians, a College of Surgeons, a College of Obstetricians and Gynaecologists, a College of Nursing, a College of Midwives and a college of Veterinary Surgeons, all of them Royal Colleges; there is a College of Speech Therapists and a College of Physical Education, but there is no college or academic body to represent primarily the interests of the largest group of medical personnel in this country – the 20,000 general practitioners".

There was opposition in the UK to the creation of a College by the existing three Medical Colleges – Colleges of Surgeons, Physicians and Obstetricians and Gynaecologists – who held the belief that general practice should be a joint faculty of general practice linked to the existing Colleges. However, put into perspective, in the same document Hunt describes the two original British Colleges sought to stop the creation of the College of Obstetricians and Gynaecologists via legal action in 1929.

=== The development of the Australian College of General Practitioners ===
The British College of General Practitioners was formed in 1953 with many Australian doctors amongst the founding members including the RACGP's first president Dr William Conolly, again reflecting the origins of Australia as a series of British colonies, established a New South Wales faculty of the BCGP. This was followed by the creation of other state based faculties of the British College of General Practitioners in Queensland, Western Australia, Tasmania, Victoria and South Australia over the next 5 years.

In keeping with the process for creating Medical Colleges under the British system, a group of Australian General Practitioners met in 1957 at the first Annual Scientific Convention in Sydney to declare an intention to form the Australian College of General Practitioners (ACGP) which was formally founded in 1958. This new College joined the state based faculties. State based faculties remain a key part of the modern day function of the RACGP.

=== Recognition of general practice as a medical specialty ===
In modern Australia, general practice is listed by the AMC as a medical specialty and the RACGP as the specialist college responsible for assessment, as endorsed by the Medical Board of Australia inaugurated in 2010. Yet, on further examination of how general practice is considered across the nation, some of the now-defunct state-based Medical Practitioners' Boards such as Victoria, Queensland and South Australia, did not consider general practice a medical specialty and general practice qualifications, such as the Fellowship of the Royal Australian College of General Practitioners (FRACGP) were not registerable qualifications. The practical implication of the nationalisation of medical registration on the status of general practice as a medical specialty may be unclear.

In Australia, general practice has historically faced a lower perceived professional status compared to other medical specialties. This perception is sometimes reflected in public and professional attitudes that view general practice as a stepping stone rather than a distinct specialty.

This is not without precedent. The history of the general practitioner shows that GPs in early Australia through to GPs in mid and late 20th century, 'defaulted' into general practice having disliked surgical or physician training or having failed exit exams too often.

Also, while Australian general practitioners were part of the creation of the Royal College of General Practitioners and instrumental in highlighting the need for professional and practice standards, Australia was one of the last developed countries to recognise general practice as a specialty. It was 1978 before the National Specialist Qualification Advisory Committee (the predecessor to the Australian Medical Council) recognised general practice as a specialty. In contrast, the United Kingdom had a powerful case for recognition by the late 1960s, and the United States recognised general practice in 1969.

==== Strengthening general practice ====
The standing of general practice within academic faculties of universities and professionally has undergone a marked increase in recent decades. The RACGP has been a key driver of this shift. The development and consolidation of training programs, standards for training, standards for practice, curriculum of general practice and various evidence based guidelines and publications have occurred internally within the RACGP.

===== Academic general practice =====
Demonstrating again the slow shift towards recognition, Australia was late in accepting that general practice should be taught or regarded as a discipline in its own right. The Whitlam government's Karmel committee into 'Expansion of Medical Education in Australia' compromised with departments of 'community medicine' – a confusing anachronism that persisted for many years in Australia's tertiary institutions. The RACGP sought strongly but unsuccessfully that this committee accept general practice into the universities.

Today, general practice is listed or has been added alongside community medicine, highlighting the shift since the early 1970s (e.g. Department of General Practice and Community Medicine Monash University)

Nine foundation professors of 'Community Practice' were appointed between 1974 and 1976. Again, Australia lagged behind the US and the UK who appointed their first professors and chairs of general practice and family medicine in 1967 and 1963 respectively.

The foundation professors were:

- Charles Bridges Webb MD FRACGP, Sydney University. Professor of Community Medicine
- Max Kamien MD FRACP, MRCP, FRACGP, DPM, DCH University of Western Australia, Professor of General Practice
- Professor Neil Edwin Carson FRACGP FRACP Professor of Community Medicine Monash University
- Jean Norella Lickliss MD MRACP, FRCP BMedSc DTM&H Professor of Community Medicine University of Tasmania
- Timothy George Murrell MD FRACGP DTM&H CLJ Professor of Community Medicine
- Anthony James Radford FRCP MRCP FRACP MFCM SM DTM&H Professor of Primary Health care Flinders University
- James Geoffrey Ryan BSc FRACGP Professor of community practice University of Queensland
- Ian William Webster MD FRACP Professor of Community Medicine University of New South Wales
- Ross Wharton Webster FRACGP MRACP Professor of Community Health University of Melbourne

Notably, many did not hold general practice qualifications either from Australia or international.

== Arms ==
Coat of arms of the Royal Australian College of General Practitioners
Notes The arms' design was first raised in 1959 by college member, Dr John Radford, who discussed it with the Garter King of Arms during a visit to London, and it was then discussed by the college council in the same year. In 1960, Dr William Arnold Conolly gained approval from the Council of the Royal College of General Practitioners, to include elements of the British college's arms into the Australian college's arms. The design was then finalised by the Richmond Herald. Adopted Granted by the Kings of Arms, 15 May 1962. Crest On a Wreath Azure and Gules a Golden Wattle Tree flowered and leaved proper. Helm A closed Helmet, mantling Azure and Gules, doubled Argent. Escutcheon Argent on a Cross Gules a forked Staff entwined with a Serpent Or between four Mullets of six points Gold. Supporters On the dexter side a Kangaroo proper and on the sinister side a Unicorn Argent armed unguled crined and tufted Or. Compartment A field of Grass Vert. Symbolism The red cross has dual meaning as the international symbol of medical services, as well as the Cross of Saint George, which is present on the Coat of Arms of New South Wales, where the college was first established. The four stars represent the Southern Cross and are in gold like the stars on the cross in the NSW Arms; the stars also have six points each to represent the six faculties of the college. The Rod of Asclepius in the centre of the cross is a classical symbol of healing and medicine. The crest features a Golden Wattle Tree, representing the national floral emblem of Australia, as well as the growth of a members' organisation. The mantling in red and blue represents the robes of the college members. The Kangaroo supporter represents Australia and is taken from the national coat of arms, while the Unicorn was chosen as it was fabled for its healing properties. Both the unicorn and the motto are shared with the arms (granted in 1961) of the Royal College of General Practitioners, with their presence approved by the college.

== See also ==
- Australian Medical Association
- Accreditation process for International Medical Graduates
