= John Gerrard (doctor) =

Australian public health doctors (born 1961)

Dr John Gerrard
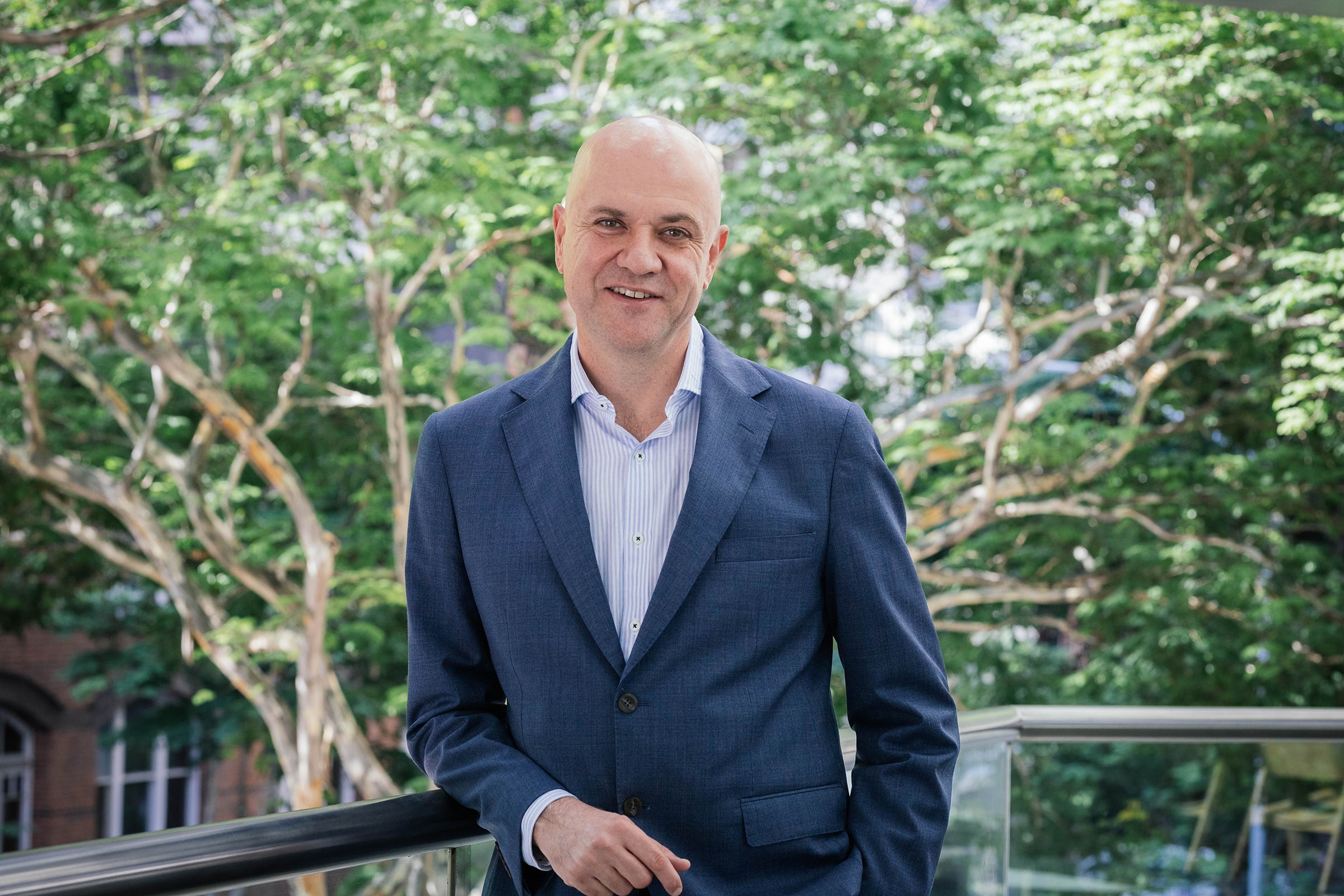

Chief Health Officer of Queensland
- In office 13 December 2021 – 12 December 2024
- Preceded by: Jeannette Young
- Succeeded by: Dr Heidi Carroll

Personal details
- Born: 13 December 1961 (age 64)
- Spouse: Anthea
- Children: 2
- Education: University of Sydney (MBBS)

John Gerrard was the former Chief Health Officer of Queensland, beginning the role in December 2021. Gerrard has a record in research of emerging infectious diseases and vaccine development, investigating AIDS in Australia and dealing with the Ebola outbreak in West Africa in 2014. Gerrard has additionally become notable during the COVID-19 Pandemic, previously working as a director of infectious diseases at the Gold Coast University Hospital and being the first doctor in Queensland to treat a COVID-19 patient.

== Career ==
Gerrard was born in 1960 and attended medical school at the University of Sydney, studying a Bachelor of Medicine and Surgery. Dr Gerrard had attended the medical school together with former Chief Health Officer of Queensland, Jeannette Young. After graduating, Gerrard worked as a doctor at the Royal Prince Alfred in Sydney. Gerrard has spent many years researching infectious diseases and vaccine developments. He identified the nation's first known person with AIDS, 12 years after the patient died of a "mystery" pneumonia, which proved HIV was in Australia from February 1981. Gerrard also helped to deal with an Ebola outbreak in West Africa in 2014.

Gerrard assisted in designing the Gold Coast University Hospital to be able to deal with an outbreak of an airborne infectious disease such as COVID-19. In late January 2020, Gerrard treated the first Queensland COVID-19 patient, who was a 44-year-old man from Wuhan, China. This was before the novel coronavirus that had started transmitting throughout the world had been named. Gerrard also in addition treated Hollywood actor Tom Hanks for COVID-19 on the Gold Coast. Additionally, Dr Gerrard was the lead medical specialist in two separate international COVID responses. This included the Diamond Princess Cruise Ship Outbreak in Japan in February 2020 and the Dutch Antilles in early 2021.

On 22 November 2021, Gerrard was announced as the new Chief Health Officer of Queensland, succeeding Jeannette Young as she moved into the role of Governor of Queensland. Gerrard commenced his role in mid-December 2021, just as the state was in the process of reopening its borders to travellers from COVID hotspots, specifically those in New South Wales, Victoria and the Australian Capital Territory.

== Personal life ==
At the age of 6, Gerrard's brother, Steven, aged 11, died of H3N2 influenza. Gerrard is married and has two daughters.
