= Thomas Bradley (judge) =

Australian lawyer and Governor of Queensland

His Excellency The Honourable Thomas Bradley AC KC

28th Governor of Queensland
- Incumbent
- Assumed office 1 November 2026
- Monarch: King Charles III
- Premier: David Crisafulli
- Preceded by: Jeannette Young

Judge of the Supreme Court of Queensland
- In office 3 December 2018 – 12 October 2026

Personal details
- Born: Cairns, Queensland, Australia
- Education: University of Queensland

Thomas Joseph Bradley is the Governor of Queensland. A lawyer, he was appointed as a judge of the Supreme Court of Queensland in 2018, and in 2025 was appointed to Queensland's Court of Appeal. In 2026 it was announced he would succeed Jeannette Young as Governor of Queensland, and he was sworn in at Parliament House, Brisbane, on 1 November 2026.

== Early life ==
Bradley was born in Cairns, Queensland. He attended St Bernard's School and Clairvaux College, Brisbane, and went on to graduate Bachelor of Laws at the University of Queensland.

== Career ==
=== Legal career ===
Bradley served his articles of clerkship with Morris Fletcher & Cross, which later merged with Minter Ellison. He practised in commercial litigation and corporate advisory work, including secondments as counsel to Cable & Wireless Optus, Incitec Fertilisers and Shell Australia. He was called to the Queensland Bar in 2000 and appointed Queen's Counsel in 2013. His practice "was predominantly in commercial disputes with a particular focus on economic regulation, competition, energy and resources, and construction".

Bradley was a part-time lecturer in law at the Queensland University of Technology (1992–1994) and the University of Queensland (1993–1996). He also served as treasurer of the Bar Association of Queensland.

Bradley was appointed to the trial division of the Supreme Court of Queensland on 3 December 2018. He was appointed to the Court of Appeal on 31 March 2025.

=== Politics ===
Bradley was an officeholder in the Queensland National Party. He stood unsuccessfully for the party in the seat of Longman in the 1996 federal election and in second position behind Bill O'Chee on the party's Senate ticket at the 1998 election.

Bradley has been described as a "staunch monarchist" and was a delegate to the 1998 Australian Constitutional Convention, being elected on the Australians for Constitutional Monarchy ticket in Queensland.

=== Other activities ===
Bradley has served on the council of the National Library of Australia (2014–2018) and the foundation committee of QAGOMA (2013–2019). He has also served as chair of the Brisbane Writers Festival, chair of the Brisbane Festival's giving committee, and president and chair of Access Arts, "a body working to support access to the arts for people with disability or disadvantage".

== Governor of Queensland ==
In August 2026, Queensland premier David Crisafulli announced that he had nominated Bradley to succeed Jeanette Young as Governor of Queensland. His term would commence on 1 November 2026.

== Honours ==
Viceregal styles of Thomas Bradley, KC (2026–Present)
- Reference style: His Excellency the Honourable
- Spoken style: Your Excellency

Companion of the Order of Australia (AC)	13 November 2026 for his appointment as Governor of Queensland.

=== Appointments ===
- 2013: Queen's Counsel

=== Honorary appointments ===
- 1 November 2026, upon his appointment as governor.
  - (Australia) Australian Army, Regimental Colonel of the Royal Queensland Regiment.
  - (United Kingdom) Order of St John, Deputy Prior of the Order of St John.
  - Scouts Australia, Chief Scout of Scouts Australia QLD
  - Royal Australian Air Force Honorary, Air Commodore of No. 23 Squadron RAAF

== Personal life ==
As of 2026 Bradley was in a relationship with Matthew Yoong, a general practitioner. He would reportedly be Australia's first openly gay state governor.

Bradley was a member of the Tattersalls Club, and in 2018 supported retaining the club's male-only status.

Government offices
Preceded by Jeannette Young	Governor of Queensland; 1 November 2026 – present	Incumbent
