= Jean Saidman =

Romanian-French heliotherapist

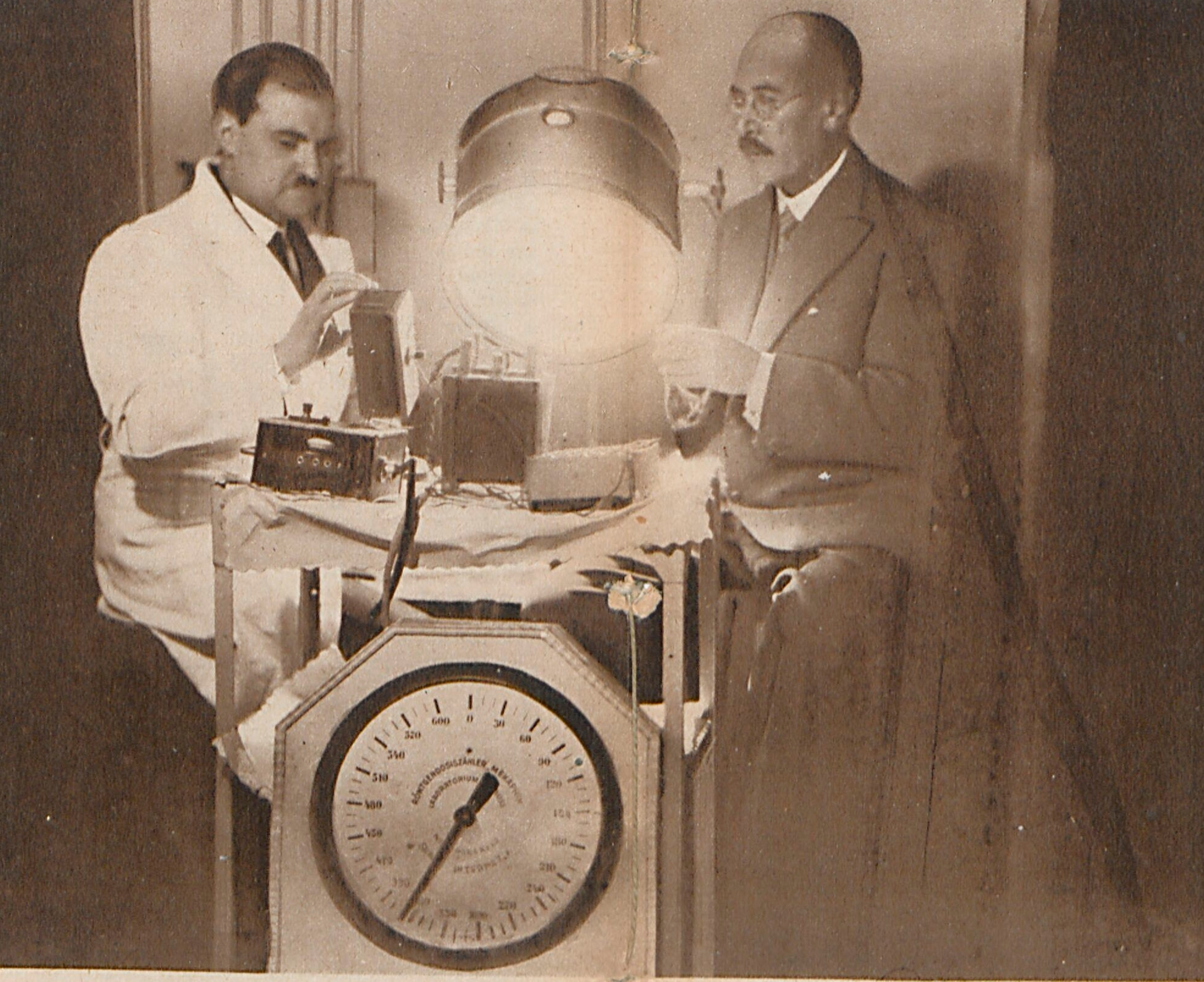
Saidman (left) with Dr Strauss of Vienna, c. 1932

Jean Saidman (19 November 1897 – 6 July 1949) was a French radiologist who promoted the idea of heliotherapy or actinotherapy, using solar radiation to cure various diseases such as tuberculosis. He built special rotating structures called solariums at Aix-les-Bains and Vallauris in France and at Jamnagar, Gujarat, in India. After World War II he was also among the first to introduce Ayurvedic medicine and to encourage research on them in France.

== Life and work ==
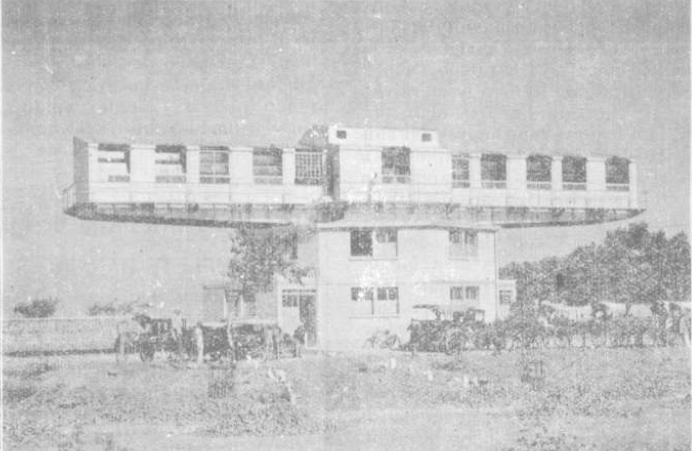
The Solarium in Jamnagar, India with its rotatable seating area.

Jean Saidman was born on 19 November 1897 in Fălticeni in the Romanian Old Kingdom and came to France at the age of 14. He studied at the Jeanson de Sailly high school before joining the faculty of Medicine in Paris. During World War I, he joined the Foreign Legion as an auxiliary doctor but continued to study and passed his exams during breaks. He received a Crox de guerre and naturalized on October 6, 1919. In 1920 Saidman went to the Hospital Cochin and worked with Alexis Pissavy and was involved in X-ray studies of patients under Maxime Ménard. He then wrote his doctoral thesis on turberculosis. In 1923 he worked with René Robine on the treatment of adenitis using X-rays. Saidman believed in the use of radiation, ultraviolet and infrared rays from the sun for various therapeutic purposes. He founded the French Society of Photobiology, invented a skin sensitometer and founded an Institute of Actinology in 1927 in the Vaugirard quartier of Paris. He was supported by eminent personalities like Jules-Louis Breton, Daniel Berthelot, and Louis Ribadcau-Dumas. He build revolving solariums to track the sun, fitted with lenses, and special filters for specific wavelengths to treat patients. One was located at Aix-les-Bains and a second was built at Côte-d'Azur, in Vallauris. He noted that patients differed in their needs and skin sensitivities and developed protocols to determine them. When the ruler of Jamnagar, Ranjitsinhji (1872–1933) visited France, he noted that India had no shortage of sunlight to help treat patients, and invited Saidman to construct a similar system in Jamnagar (it was completed after the death of Ranjitsinhji and named as the Ranjit Institute of Poly-Radio Therapy, Jamnagar). The lenses and other parts of the Jamnagar solarium were destroyed in a cyclone but the structure still stands. Saidman learned about Indian medicine on his visit and after 1947 he began to take an interest in some of the herbal medicines that he had learned about in India. By this time, antibiotics had shown themselves effective in tuberculosis and his actinotherapy had been made obsolete. Saidman collaborated with René-Henri Monceaux (1900–1976) and Rémus Krainik (1895–1967). In 1938 Saidman and Krainik visited Jamnagar and after the war, they visited again in 1946. They collaborated with Dr P. M. Mehta to establish a “Neo-Ayurveda Action Committee” in Paris in 1946 under Saidman with members who included Krainik, Monceaux, professor Maxime Laignel-Lavastine, Pierre Delore, Jean Filliozat, Émile Perrot, Lucien Comil, and Guy Laroche. On October 28 of the same year, they established a company to produce "polytherapy", pharmaceuticals based on plant materials produced from Jamnagar using Ayurvedic knowledge.
