= Pranjivandas Manekchand Mehta =

Pranjivandas Manekchand Mehta (1889–1981) was an Indian physician, surgeon, and Chief Medical Officer of the former Princely State of Nawanagar, Gujarat, British India, where he was the personal physician to the Maharajah Jamsaheb. With the French radiologist, Jean Saidman, Mehta oversaw the creation of India's first solarium. He later co-founded the Shri Gulabkunverba Ayurvedic Society dedicated to Ayurvedic studies, persuaded the Maharajah to fund a medical college in Nawanagar's capital, and co-ordinated a detailed translation of the ancient Sanskrit medical text Charaka Samhita.

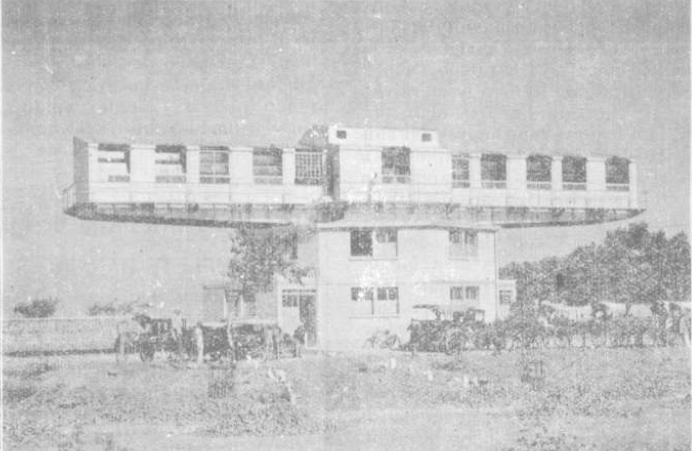
The Solarium in Jamnagar, India with its rotatable seating area.

== Selected publications ==
- Mehta, P. M. (February 1941). "Erythema Standard for Dose in Light". The Indian Medical Gazette. 76 (2): 105–115. ISSN 0019-5863. PMC 5184974. PMID 29013529.
- Mehta, P. M. (May 1942). "Measurement of Radiant Energy in Light Therapy". The Indian Medical Gazette. 77 (5): 296–300. ISSN 0019-5863. PMC 5169022. PMID 29012471.
- MEHTA PM (December 1945). "Need of sympathetic study of Ayurveda by modern medical men". Journal of the Indian Medical Association. 15: 86. ISSN 0019-5847. PMID 21017362.
- Mehta, P. M. (October 1952). "History of medicine". Indian Medical Journal. 46 (10): 220–222. ISSN 0019-5871. PMID 13010826.
- The Caraka Saṃhitā Expounded by the Worshipful Ātreya Punarvasu, Compiled by the Great Sage Agniveśa and Redacted by Caraka & Dṛḍhabala. Vol. 1. Jamnagar: Shree Gulabkunverba Ayurvedic Society. 1949. (Editor, 6 volumes)

== See also ==
- M. P. Shah Medical College
