= Jeannette Young =

Governor of Queensland since 2021

The Honourable Dr Jeannette Young AC PSM
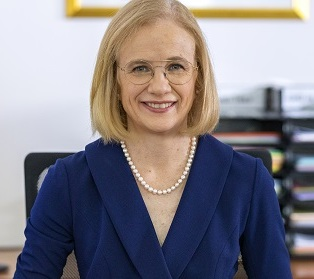
- Young in 2020

27th Governor of Queensland
- In office 1 November 2021 – 1 November 2026
- Monarchs: Elizabeth II; Charles III
- Premier: Annastacia Palaszczuk; Steven Miles; David Crisafulli
- Preceded by: Paul de Jersey
- Succeeded by: Thomas Bradley

Chief Health Officer of Queensland
- In office 22 August 2005 – 31 October 2021
- Deputy: Sonya Bennett (2020–2021); Peter Aitken (2021); Lynne McKinlay (2021); James Smith (2021)
- Preceded by: Gerry FitzGerald
- Succeeded by: Peter Aitken (acting); John Gerrard

Personal details
- Born: 1963 (age 62–63) Sydney, New South Wales, Australia
- Spouse: Graeme Nimmo (m. 2000)
- Children: 2
- Education: St Ives High School
- Alma mater: Macquarie University (MBA); University of Sydney (MBBS)
- Website: www.govhouse.qld.gov.au

Jeannette Rosita Young AC PSM (born 1963) is an Australian medical doctor and administrator who has served as Governor of Queensland 1 November 2021 until 1 November 2026. Before being sworn in as governor, Young was Chief Health Officer of Queensland from 2005 to 2021.

== Career ==
Young was born in 1963 in Sydney, New South Wales. She attended secondary school at St Ives High School, graduating in 1980, before studying at the University of Sydney and graduating in 1986 with a Bachelor of Medicine and Bachelor of Surgery. She started her career as a doctor at Westmead Hospital in Sydney in 1986 where she completed her internship and one year as a resident medical officer before completing 4.5 years as a registrar in emergency medicine. In July 1992 she moved in to medical administration at the same hospital.

She relocated to Queensland upon her appointment as director of medical services at Rockhampton Hospital in December 1994. In April 1995, she attained a Master of Business Administration by Macquarie University. She then moved into a position similar to her role in Rockhampton, as executive director of medical services at Princess Alexandra Hospital in Brisbane, in January 1999.

On 22 August 2005, she succeeded Gerry FitzGerald as Chief Health Officer of Queensland. She gained prominence during the COVID-19 pandemic in 2020, holding multiple press briefings regarding the disease. Her recommendation to the Palaszczuk Government to close the state's borders, which was implemented, proved controversial as she received numerous death threats and was placed under police protection in September 2020.

On 21 June 2021, then-Premier Annastacia Palaszczuk announced Young would become the 27th Governor of Queensland. The incumbent Governor Paul de Jersey was due to retire in July 2021, but extended his term until November to allow Young to focus on the COVID-19 vaccine rollout as Chief Health Officer. She finished her role with Queensland Health on 31 October 2021.

== Honours ==
Viceregal styles of Jeannette Young (2021–2026)
- Reference style: Her Excellency the Honourable
- Spoken style: Your Excellency

Companion of the Order of Australia (AC)	2022 Queen's Birthday Honours for "eminent service to public health administration, to medicine and medical research, to the tertiary education sector, and as the 27th Governor appointed in Queensland."	12 June 2022
Public Service Medal (PSM)	2015 Queen's Birthday Honours for "outstanding public service to Queensland Health."	8 June 2015
Dame of Grace of the Order of St John	2022 Special Honours appointment as Deputy Prior of the Venerable Order of Saint John.	21 October 2022

=== Degrees ===
- 1986: Bachelor of Medicine and Bachelor of Surgery from the University of Sydney
- 1995: Master of Business Administration from Macquarie University

=== Fellowships ===
- 2004: Fellow of the Royal Australasian College of Medical Administrators

=== Honorary degrees ===
- 2015: Honorary doctorate from Griffith University
- 2017: Honorary doctorate from Queensland University of Technology

=== Honorary appointments ===
- 1 November 2021 – 1 November 2026
  - (Australia) Australian Army, Regimental Colonel of the Royal Queensland Regiment.
  - (United Kingdom) Order of St John, Deputy Prior of the Order of St John.
  - Scouts Australia, Chief Scout of Scouts Australia QLD
  - Royal Australian Air Force Honorary, Air Commodore of No. 23 Squadron RAAF

Government offices
Preceded by Gerry FitzGerald	Chief Health Officer of Queensland; 22 August 2005 – 31 October 2021	Succeeded by John Gerrard
Preceded by Paul de Jersey	Governor of Queensland; 1 November 2021 – 1 November 2026	Succeeded by Thomas Bradley
