= Robert Stable =

Australian medical doctor

Robert L. Stable is an Australian medical doctor, and former vice-chancellor of Bond University, located on the Gold Coast, Queensland.

Stable studied medicine at the University of Queensland and earned a Master of Health Planning degree from the University of New South Wales. He then worked as a doctor and public servant in the health sector rising to become the director-general of Queensland Health in 1996. From 2000 to 2003, he was chair of the Australian Minister for Health's advisory council. In 2004, he was appointed as president and vice-chancellor of Bond University, a post he held until 2012. He has also served as hospital medical superintendent, rural general practitioner and flying doctor. Stable is also a Fellow of the Royal Australian College of General Practitioners and the Australian Institute of Company Directors. In addition, he has held adjunct professorial posts at the University of Queensland since 1997, and James Cook University since 2001.

He was awarded an honorary doctorate by the Queensland University of Technology in 2002. The Council of Bond University conferred the title of emeritus professor in December 2011. In 2013, he was appointed a Member of the Order of Australia.
