= Relative Atrial Index =

Numeric parameter used to assess for cardiac shunt defects

- Synonyms: RAI
- Purpose: assess for cardiac shunt defects.

The Relative Atrial Index (RAI) is a numeric parameter used to assess for cardiac shunt defects. It is calculated from the standard transthoracic Doppler echocardiogram measurements of the right atrial area divided by the left atrial area. RAI = right atrial area / left atrial area. These measurements are made from the apical four chamber view.

Large validation studies in patients with known atrial septal defects showed that the RAI > 1.0 in the majority of cases. This is in contrast to matched and population controls, where the RAI was significantly below 1.0. This simple numeric parameter has found a role in the diagnostic work-up for possible shunt defects on standard tranthorcaic echocardiograms. The RAI rapidly normalizes within 24 hours of percutaneous closure of atrial septal defects. Secondary validation studies have confirmed the data in discrete patient populations. This parameter has been shown to predict long-term survival after acute pulmonary embolism.

The RAI was conceptualized in response to observed clinical inadequacies of standard transthoracic echocardiography in some shunt conditions. The same author had developed several Doppler echocardiographic numeric parameters over the last two decades to assess cardiac diastolic function.

== See also ==
- Medical ultrasonography section: Doppler sonography
- Echocardiography
- American Society of Echocardiography
- Christian Doppler
