= Australian Health Practitioner Regulation Agency =

Health practitioner regulation authority

Agency overview
- Formed: 1 June 2010; 18 October 2010 for Western Australia
- Jurisdiction: Hosted by the Queensland Government, and recognised in all other states and territories
- Agency executives: Gill Callister, Chair; Kym Ayscough, Acting CEO
- Website: ahpra.gov.au

The Australian Health Practitioner Regulation Agency (Ahpra) (Note: Often incorrectly written as ""AHPRA"", with correct stylisation as Ahpra) is a cross-jurisdictional statutory authority responsible for the regulation of 15 health professions in Australia. While responsibility for regulation sits with 15 independent National Boards, Ahpra provides day-to-day services such as managing registration of and notifications (complaints) against practitioners on behalf of the National Boards.

Ahpra and the National Board's primary purpose is to protect the health and safety of the Australian public through the registration and regulation of health practitioners, including delegating accreditation of education programs and maintaining the National Register of Health Practitioners. Australia was the first country globally to introduce a national registration and accreditation scheme for regulating health practitioners.

At the end of June 2024, there were 920,535 Ahpra-registered health practitioners, representing approximately 3.2% of the Australian population. In the 2023-24 financial year, Ahpra responded to 11,200 notifications about health practitioners, of which 2% resulted in practitioner de-registration and 10.9% resulted in other regulatory action. (Note: While 19,522 notifications were made to regulators in the 2023-24 financial year, Ahpra was only responsible for 11,200 of these. The variance is due to Queensland and New South Wales state-based health regulators maintaining responsibility for health practitioner complaints in their respective jurisdictions, whereas other states and territories rely on Ahpra for these functions.)

== Legislative framework ==
Ahpra and the National Boards operate under the Health Practitioner Regulation National Law, whereby all state and territories enact similar legislation which recognises regulatory decisions made in other jurisdictions. Queensland acts as the 'host jurisdiction' of the National Law, with Queensland legislation establishing the relevant authorities which are then recognised by all other jurisdictions. National oversight and collaboration for the scheme takes place through several cross-government forums, such as the Australian Health Ministers' Conference and Australian Health Workforce Ministerial Council.

This effectively creates a national scheme, whereby health practitioner registration is managed federally, and regulation decisions apply in all other states and territories regardless of the jurisdiction that a decision was made in. In all states and territories, other than New South Wales and Queensland which have their own state-based regulators, Ahpra also manages notifications (complaints) against health practitioners. The Office of the Health Ombudsman manages complaints for Queensland-based health practitioners, and the Health Professional Councils Authority and 15 profession-specific councils manage complaints in New South Wales.

== Regulated professions and protected titles ==
As of 2022, Ahpra and the National Boards regulate 16 health professions in Australia. Registered members of these professions are called "health practitioners", while other clinicians are more generally called health professionals. 'Unregulated professions' such as sonography are still required to comply with the National Code of Conduct for Health Care Workers, however complaints are managed by state and territory health complaint organisations instead of Ahpra and the National Boards.

On 1 July 2010, the National Registration and Accreditation Scheme (NRAS) began for 10 profession groups, each with their own boards, with a further four in 2012 and one in 2018.

Board	Profession	NRAS Date
Chiropractic Board of Australia	Chiropractors	2010
Dental Board of Australia	Dental practitioners (including dentists, dental hygienists, dental prosthetists, and dental therapists)	2010
Medical Board of Australia	Medical practitioners	2010
Nursing and Midwifery Board of Australia	Nurses and midwives	2010
Optometry Board of Australia	Optometrists	2010
Osteoptathy Board of Australia	Osteopaths	2010
Pharmacy Board of Australia	Pharmacists	2010
Physiotherapy Board of Australia	Physiotherapists	2010
Podiatry Board of Australia	Podiatrists	2010
Psychology Board of Australia	Psychologists	2010
Aboriginal and Torres Strait Islander Health Practice Board of Australia	Aboriginal and Torres Strait Islander health practitioners	2012
Chinese Medicine Board of Australia	Chinese medicine practitioners (including acupuncturists, Chinese herbal medicine practitioners and Chinese herbal dispensers)	2012
Medical Radiation Practice Board of Australia	Medical radiation practitioners (including diagnostic radiographers, radiation therapists and nuclear medicine technologists)	2012
Occupational Therapy Board of Australia	Occupational therapists	2012
Paramedicine Board of Australia	Paramedics	2018

=== Protected titles ===
Under the National Law, it is unlawful for a person not registered by Ahpra for that profession to hold themselves out to be a registered health practitioner or use a "protected title". Protected titles largely reflect the profession name, such as claiming to be a medical practitioner or a registered nurse, and recognised specialities within that profession such as being neurosurgeon. Only Ahpra-registered health workers may call themselves a "health practitioner". For a person to be able to lawfully describe themselves using a protected title, they must be registered by Ahpra for that speciality and must comply with the profession's standards for practice and code of conduct.

Although there exist guidelines under the Ahpra for "medical practitioners who perform cosmetic medical and surgical procedures", "cosmetic surgeon" is not on the list of "protected titles". This meant that registered medical practitioners in Australia could these titles even when having different training and qualifications. A public consultation about this began on 1 December 2021 via Engage Victoria, an online platform run by the Victorian Department of Health, which closed feedback submissions on 1 April 2022. This resulted in the title 'surgeon' becoming a "protected title" under Australian Law.

As of June 2022, the following professions are not regulated by Ahpra or a National Board, and do not have a protected title:

- Social workers
- Speech pathologists
- Dieticians
- Audiologists
- Sonographers
- Orthotist/prosthetists
- Perfusionists
- Exercise and sport scientists

== Registration ==
There are four categories of registration conducted through the Medical Board of Australia, depending on training and expertise, including "general", "specialist", "provisional", "limited" and "non-practicing", along with a student registration. Medical graduates applying from New Zealand are treated with the same registration standards as Australians, differing from the international registration process. As of 22 July 2021, there are separate fees for both registration and application. Initial registration and application fees for general, specialist and limited registrations is $835 AUD, with some categories of New South Wales registrations receiving rebates.

The registration process includes a criminal history check, where individuals must inform the national board under application jurisdiction if they have been "charged with an offence punishable by 12 months imprisonment or more, or convicted or found guilty of an offence punishable by imprisonment in Australia and/or overseas". There exists a dispute resolution process with the Australian Criminal Intelligence Commission and relevant police departments, if the result of a criminal history check prevents registration under the Ahpra.

== Complaints process ==
In Australia, complaints to Ahpra or to the Queensland or New South Wales health regulators are termed "notifications". The notification process includes several stages, including receipt of the complaint, preliminary assessment, investigation, panel hearing, and a tribunal hearing. At any stage of the process, Ahpra may advance immediately to a tribunal hearing and/or impose an immediate restriction to prevent harm. Unlike the other stages, a tribunal hearing outcome is made to the public, and a tribunal typically consists of "a District Court judge, two medical practitioners and a lay person, specifically appointed to consider the evidence".

According to Ahpra, in 2021 there were 10,147 notifications about 7,858 health practitioners, and 1.6% of those registered were the subject of a complaint. (Note: It is implied from the source the 1.6% figure refers only to the year 2021.) According to Sharon Russell, "many medical practitioners will be the subject of an Ahpra complaint at some stage during their career".

Complaints can be made online via the Ahpra website, by mail, telephone or attending an office. There is also a whistleblower policy governed under the Public Interest Disclosure Act 2013 where anonymous complaints can be made for serious misconduct.

== Criticism ==
The Ahpra has been subject to criticism, including for medical right to privacy and informed consent of those registered, and the long amount of time taken to resolve complaints. There was an investigation in 2014 following complaints to the Ahpra about how complaints are managed, including a lack of transparency over the complaint review process, and delays in investigations, with one case taking 2,368 days to resolve. There have been senate inquiries (see Australian Senate committees) by the Parliament of Australia in 2011, 2017 and 2021 over related issues. The 2021 public submission of support from the Royal Australian College of General Practitioners identified the main issues with the Ahpra as being "communication, transparency and timeliness of the complaints mechanism, and the importance of appropriate recognition of the impacts of assessment and investigation on a practitioner’s mental health". Over a four-year period, researchers identified 16 suicides and a further four instances of attempted suicide or self-harm among health care workers subject to regulatory notifications.

Submissions for the 2021 senate inquiry were extended to March 2022, with the final senate report being released on 1 April 2022. The senate inquiry resulted in 14 recommendations, including improving the complaints process, more flexible re-registration after a period of absence, and the regulation of surgeons, social workers, aged care workers and personal care workers along with adding these professions to the list of "protected titles".
