= M. P. Shah Medical College =

Jamnagar Medical College, Gujarat, India

Coordinates: 22.4779°N 70.0656°E

Shri M. P. Shah Government Medical College
- શ્રી એમ.પી. શાહ સરકારી મેડિકલ કોલેજ
- Motto: पूर्णम स्वास्थ्यम ध्येयम
- Motto in English: Goal of Total Health
- Type: Public medical college
- Established: 1954; 72 years ago
- Founders: Jam Saheb Shri Digvijaysinhji
- Affiliations: Saurashtra University
- Dean: Dr. Nandini Desai
- Undergraduates: 250
- Postgraduates: 176
- Location: Jamnagar, Gujarat, India
- Website: www.mpsmc.in

Shri Meghji Pethraj Shah Government Medical College (also known as M. P. Shah Medical College), named after Meghji Pethraj Shah, is a public medical college in Jamnagar, Gujarat, India. It is associated with the Guru Gobindsingh Government Hospital (G.G.G. Hospital), formerly known as Irwin Hospital, the second-largest hospital complex in the state of Gujarat.

== History ==
G.G. Hospital (the academic medical center associated with the M.P. Shah Medical College) was inaugurated by Lord Irwin in 1927. In 1933, during the rule of Digvijaysinhji Ranjitsinhji, the Irwin Hospital was expanded, with the addition of specialty departments. Abdul Karim Jamal started a dispensary opposite Irwin Hospital (A. K. Jamal Dispensary) and the Sarmatwala dispensary was started during this period. All these dispensaries including the city dispensary were merged with G.G Hospital — hence the name G.G. Hospitals.

In 1954, M. P. Shah Medical College came into existence and Irwin hospital was affiliated with it. In 2000, on the eve of the 300th birthday anniversary of Lord Guru Gobind Singh, Government of Gujarat renamed the Irwin Group of Hospitals as Guru Gobind Singh Hospital.

Dr. Dadabhai and Dr. Kalyaniwala Khandbahadur were the first heads of Irwin Group of Hospitals. Dr. Ruks Thomas (FRCS) was appointed as the first surgeon general in 1927. Dr. Pranjivandas Manekchand Mehta was his successor. At the establishment of M.P. Shah Medical College in 1954, Dr. Ramniklal C. Talsania & then Dr. P. C. Rakshit took over from Dr. P. M. Mehta as the first dean and medical superintendent. At present Dr. Deepak Tiwari is medical superintendent of G.G. Hospital.

== Facilities ==
Starting with 200 beds in 1927, the hospital has seen several major expansions. Today, it is one of the leading tertiary care and referral medical centers for the region of Saurashtra with a bed strength of 1275 (2005). The hospital has 50 indoor wards and 10 operation theaters.

== Affiliations ==
It is affiliated with Saurashtra University and offers the following courses:

- MBBS
- MD, General Medicine
- MD, radio diagnosis, radiology
- MD, tuberculosis and respiratory diseases, pulmonary medicine
- MD, Paediatrics
- MD/MS, obstetrics and M gynaecology
- MD/MS, ophthalmology
- MS, Ear, Nose and Throat
- MS, General Surgery
- MS, Orthopaedics
- MD, Anaesthesia

== Seats ==
SANCTION PG UG SEATS AS PER MCI ON FEBRUARY-2019
No	Subject	MCI Intake Recognized PG Seats
1	ANATOMY	4
2	PHYSIOLOGY	4
3	PHARMACOLOGY	6
4	MICROBIOLOGY	5
5	PATHOLOGY	9
6	P.S.M.	7
7	FORENSIC MEDICINE	2
8	SURGERY	16
9	MEDICINE	17
10	OBST. & GYNAC.	5
11	ORTHOPEDICS	9
12	OPHTHALMOLOGY	8
13	ANAESTHESIOLOGY	12
14	RADIOLOGY	6
15	PEDIATRICS -3	3
16	ENT	3
17	PSYCHIATRY	2
18	TB & CHEST	3
19	RADIOTHERAPY	1
20	SKIN V.D.	2
21	I.H.B.T.	1
	TOTAL	125
SUPER SPECIALITY		
	Mch Plastic Surgery	1
U.G.	M.B.B.S.	250

== See also ==
- List of medical colleges in India
