= Davies Commission =

The Queensland Public Hospitals Commission of Inquiry, often referred to as the Davies Commission, was an inquiry into public hospitals in Queensland, Australia. The inquiry was headed by The Honourable Geoffrey Davies AO QC, a former Supreme Court judge of appeal.

== Establishment ==
The commission was established by the Queensland Governor-In-Council in 2005 to investigate, among other things, the conduct of Dr Jayant Patel, a former surgeon of Bundaberg Base Hospital. It was not a Royal Commission and therefore had limited powers. The Commission commenced after the failure of a similar commission headed by Mr Tony Morris, called the Bundaberg Hospital Commission of Inquiry.

Bundaberg Hospital administrators Darren Keating and Peter Leck undertook a court case against Morris. The Morris Inquiry was wound up after Supreme Court Justice Martin Moynihan found Mr Morris had been biased. Hearings began on 23 May 2005.

== Findings ==
The commission found gross negligence in Patel's conduct, as well as systematic failures of management to deal with the problem. Davies recommended that Patel be referred to the public prosecutor for consideration of manslaughter, fraud, and assault charges. In total seventeen patient deaths were referred to police. An extradition process was begun after the police issued a warrant for Patel, acting on 14 offences.

The report also found that amongst Queensland Health bureaucrats concerns regarding "significant and sustained statewide adverse publicity" were rated as significant as "loss of life".

The state chief health officer at the time, Dr Gerry FitzGerald was criticised for his own investigation into Patel, describing it as too positive.

== See also ==
- Health care in Australia
