= Bundaberg Base Hospital =

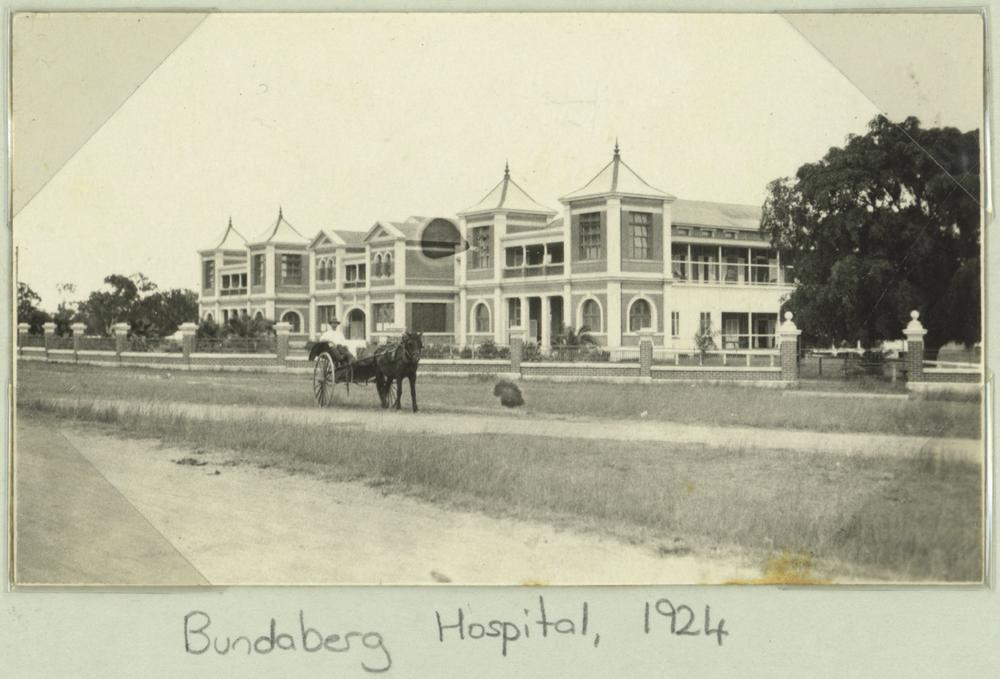
- Bundaberg Hospital, c. 1924

Geography
- Location: 271 Bourbong St, Bundaberg, Queensland, Australia
- Coordinates: 24°52′09.77″S 152°20′08.07″E

Organisation
- Care system: Medicare (Australia)
- Type: Regional hospital
- Network: Queensland Health

Services
- Emergency department: Yes

Helipads
- Helipad: (ICAO: YXBD)
Number	Length		Surface
Number	ft	m	Surface
1			bitumen

History
- Founded: 1914

Links
- Website: www.health.qld.gov.au/widebay/our-services-and-facilities/bundaberg
- Lists: Hospitals in Australia

Bundaberg Base Hospital is the public hospital of Bundaberg, Queensland, Australia. Bundaberg Base Hospital was opened by the Governor of Queensland in 1914.

A base hospital is a regional centre that takes referrals from outlying hospitals, and concentrates specialised skills. Australia has a universal publicly funded health insurance scheme, so a 'public' hospital is one that is supported by public funds rather than by charging individual patients. There are two private hospitals in the same city.

The hospital has an annual budget of $56 million.

== Jayant Patel ==
Bundaberg Hospital was the scene of a political scandal, due to the 'gross negligence' of one of its surgeons, Jayant Patel. Manslaughter charges were recommended against him, while charges of official misconduct were levelled at the hospital's Director of Medical Services, Dr Darren Keating (the top-ranked doctor) and District Manager, Peter Leck (the CEO).

On 29 June 2010, Jayant Patel was found guilty of the unlawful killing of three patients, and grievous bodily harm to a fourth. On 1 July he was sentenced to seven years jail for his offences. His lawyers made a successful appeal to the High Court of Australia where his convictions of manslaughter and grievous bodily harm were quashed and a new trial was ordered.

== See also ==
- List of hospitals in Australia
