= Queensland Health =

Public health system in Queensland, Australia

Agency overview
- Formed: 1859; 167 years ago
- Jurisdiction: Queensland Government
- Headquarters: 1 William Street, Brisbane
- Employees: ▲146,755 (as at 30 June 2026)
- Annual budget: ▲ A$33.1 billion (FY2025–26)
- Minister responsible: Tim Nicholls, Minister for Health and Ambulance Services
- Deputy Minister responsible: Donna Kirkland, Assistant Minister for Mental Health, Drug and Alcohol Treatment, Families and Seniors and Central Queensland
- Agency executive: David Rosengren, Director-General
- Website: health.qld.gov.au

Queensland Health is the public health system in Queensland, Australia, comprising sixteen statutory Hospital and Health Services (HHS), the Department of Health and Queensland Ambulance Service. Each HHS provides health services to its local area, with Children's Health Queensland supporting state-wide paediatric specialist services. The Department of Health provides corporate support such as payroll, finance, information technology and procurement, and provides clinical governance over the health system's operations. Queensland Health provides free or low-cost health services to Medicare card holders in Queensland, and some services to New South Wales and Northern Territory patients where services are unavailable locally.

The Queensland Government was the first state government to introduce free, universal public hospital treatment in 1946, a policy later adopted by other states and territories. Most HHS also have associated foundations or charities which raise discretionary funds to support medical research or non-clinical programs. Queensland Health employs over 130,000 people state-wide and has an annual operating budget of A$33.1 billion. At the end of June 2026, Queensland Health had 14,704 beds or equivalents, 431 of which were intensive care beds.

== Hospital and Health Services ==
The Health and Hospital Services are independent statutory bodies which are responsible for delivering public health services in their areas. Each HHS is governed by a Hospital and Health Board and managed by a Health Service Chief Executive. There are 15 regional HHSes, and one state-wide HHS (Children's Health Queensland). The HHSes are:

- Cairns and Hinterland
- Central Queensland
- Central West
- Darling Downs
- Gold Coast
- Mackay
- Metro North
- Metro South
- North West
- South West
- Sunshine Coast
- Torres and Cape
- Townsville
- West Moreton
- Wide Bay
- Children's Health Queensland

Children's Health Queensland (CHQ) operates the state-wide children's hospital in South Brisbane, as well as provides specialist advice to health practitioner in Queensland via telehealth, and runs programs throughout the state such as the Good Start Program and school-based nursing services. Children from anywhere across Queensland can be referred to CHQ for tertiary paediatric care, and can receive specialist care at Queensland Children's Hospital.

As not all HHSes are able to provide advanced care services, largely due to the size and remoteness of its catchments, some HHS (primarily Metro North and Metro South) accept referrals from outside their catchment where the service cannot be provided locally. To assist with this, Queensland has a Patient Travel Subsidy Scheme which covers some costs of transport and accommodation to another public facility if it cannot be provided locally.

== History ==
=== 2005 restructure ===
Queensland Health was restructured toward the end of 2005 from 38 health districts to 20. There were a number consolidations particularly in the urban areas with the formation of the "Northside" and "Southside" Districts. Northside District included three major hospital facilities including The Prince Charles Hospital, Redcliffe and Caboolture Hospitals while Southside brought the Logan, Redlands, Beaudesert and Queen Elizabeth II Jubilee Hospitals together. Due to their size and areas they covered, the Royal Brisbane and Women's Hospital (RBWH) on the Northside, and the Princess Alexandra Hospital on the Southside remained independent districts in their own right.

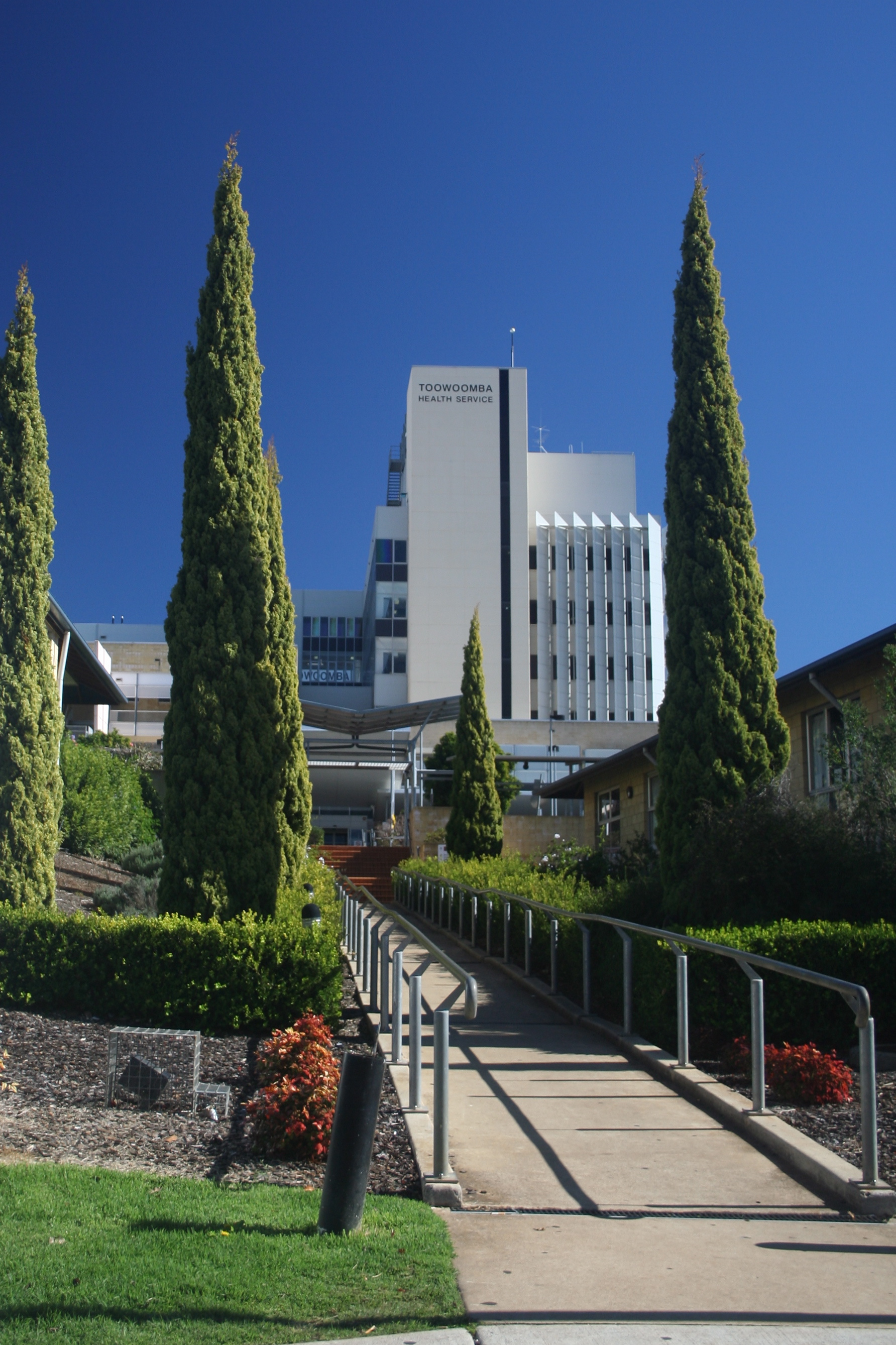
Toowoomba Hospital, 2008

In September 2008, the 20 health service districts were further reduced to 15. Six new districts were created, merging together other districts:

- Darling Downs–West Moreton incorporating the former Toowoomba and Darling Downs and West Moreton South Burnett districts.
- Sunshine Coast–Wide Bay incorporating the Sunshine Coast – Cooloola, Wide Bay and Fraser Coast health service districts.
- Metro South incorporates the Southside Health Service District and Princess Alexandra Hospital.
- Metro North incorporates the Northside Health Service District and Royal Brisbane and Women's Hospital.
- Children's Health Services, will oversee the implementation of a state-wide paediatric service.

=== 2006 Health Quality and Complaints Commission ===
In response to the Forster Review of Queensland Health Systems an independent Health Quality and Complaints Commission was established on 1 July 2006 to allow patients to lodge complaints about health matters.

The (full-time) Commissioner is Professor Michael Ward, a former Professor of Medicine at the University of Queensland. There are also a number of part-time Assistant Commissioners.

The Health Quality and Complaints Commission also has a role in the development and implementation of quality, safety and clinical practice standards throughout Queensland's public and private services and monitor best practice clinical governance and patient safety.

It was subject to review by an all-party Parliamentary Committee after its first full year of operation.

The HQCC has since been replaced by the Office of the Health Ombudsman.

=== 2011 proposed decentralisation ===
Former Premier Anna Bligh announced on 12 December 2011 that the department would be dismantled. The decision was attributed to an "unacceptable culture", the theft of $16 million from the department and problems with the payroll system which has cost hundreds of millions of dollars. The department was due to cease operations on 1 July 2012.

In January 2012, more details of the reform plan were announced, with an emphasis on health care management to be done locally. Bligh described the changes as the biggest decentralisation of the public sector in the state's history. In March 2012, the ALP lost power in Queensland and the proposed abolition of Queensland Health did not eventuate.

=== 2012 restructure ===
The 2011 National Health Reform Agreement was signed by all states and territories, and required the creation of local health boards and hospital networks that would be directly funded by the Commonwealth. In May 2012, the agreement was formalised in Queensland through legislation proposed by Lawrence Springborg, which transitioned the health districts to independent Hospital and Health Service entities. Under the new arrangements, each HHS would have their own board to manage and oversee health operations in that region. The boards are accountable to the minister for health, and the Department of Health was established as a 'system manager' to provide oversight and support to each of the services. These changes became effective on 1 July 2012.

== Chief health officers ==
The role of the chief health officer is to provide "leadership to the public health, population health, health protection and other major regulatory activities of [Queensland]'s health system".

Acting chief health officers only listed when a permanent chief health officer was not employed in the role.

| No | Name | Start date | End date | Tenure | Ref |
|---|---|---|---|---|---|
| 1 | Diana Lange | 1991 | 1999 | 8 years | |
| 2 | Bryan Campbell | May 2000 | 31 January 2003 | 2 years, 8 months | |
| 3 | Gerry FitzGerald | 31 January 2003 | 21 August 2005 | 2 years, 202 days | |
| 4 | Jeannette Young | 22 August 2005 | 31 October 2021 | 16 years, 75 days | |
| Acting | Peter Aitken | 1 November 2021 | 12 December 2021 | 41 days | |
| 5 | John Gerrard | 13 December 2021 | 12 December 2024 | 2 years, 365 days | |
| Acting | Heidi Carroll | 13 December 2024 | 18 July 2025 | 217 days | |
| Acting | Catherine McDougall | 11 July 2025 | 30 November 2025 | 142 days | |
| 6 | Marianne Gale | 1 December 2025 | incumbent | 350 days | |

== Controversy ==
=== Jayant Patel scandal ===
Queensland Health and the Bundaberg Base Hospital were involved in a scandal surrounding the employment of surgeon Jayant Patel. The Queensland Medical Board approved his registration and he was then quickly promoted to Director of Surgery even though he lacked specific qualifications. In March 2005, Rob Messenger raised concerns with Patel's medical practices in the Queensland Parliament after he was contacted by senior hospital nurse Toni Hoffman. Hoffman received the Order of Australia medal and 2006 Australian of the Year Local Hero Award for her role as a whistleblower. An inquiry into the matter known as the Morris Inquiry was started but was terminated on the grounds of perceived bias. A second inquiry known as the Davies Inquiry found that the district manager and the hospital's Director of Medical Services had mostly ignored more than 20 complaints regarding Patel.

On 1 July 2010, Patel was sentenced to seven years' jail after he was found guilty of three charges of manslaughter and one count of grievous bodily harm. Patel appealed his conviction and sentence to the Court of Appeal, his appeal was dismissed. Patel appealed to the Queensland Court of Appeal who rejected his application. He further appealed to the High Court of Australia, which unanimously allowed the appeal and quashed Patel's convictions on the ground that prejudicial evidence had likely influenced the jury on 24 August 2012.

The following year, a retrial was held for one of the manslaughter charges, and Patel was acquitted by the jury. The remaining manslaughter and grievous bodily harm charges were later dropped in exchange for Patel pleading guilty to two counts related to him dishonestly gaining registration and two counts related to dishonestly gaining employment in Queensland. Patel was sentenced to a two-year suspended sentence for those fraud charges. On 15 May 2015, the Queensland Civil and Administrative Tribunal ordered that Patel's registration with the Medical Board of Australia be revoked, preventing him from ever practising medicine in Australia again.

=== Fake Tahitian Prince scandal ===
New Zealand citizen and Queensland Health employee, Hohepa Hikairo 'Joel' Morehu-Barlow, was jailed in 2013 for embezzlement of $16 million from the system between 2007 and 2011. He also pleaded guilty to fraud, for taking part in a Tahitian Prince scam and for using a fake law degree to secure a promotion within Queensland Health. The Queensland Crime and Corruption Commission said in 2013 that the fraud "may be the single largest fraud ever committed in the Queensland public sector".

In 2020 upon his parole from custody, the Australian Border Force cancelled Morehu-Barlow's visa and he was deported to New Zealand under the Migration Act 1958 (Cth).

=== 2010 payroll system implementation ===
Queensland Health has experienced several issues with its payroll systems and processes over the years, most notably the troublesome 2010 payroll system replacement project. Queensland Health's 2010 payroll system replacement came as a centralisation effort from the Shared Services Initiative, a related precursor to the current Smart Service Queensland whole-of-government offering.

The SAP and Workbrain-based payroll system was implemented by IBM, initially as an interim system to replace the former LATTICE system which was rapidly becoming unsupported by the vendor, and later to be consolidated whole-of-agency payroll and human resources system. The new payroll system went live in March 2010 despite inadequate testing and an expectation that the system would fail to accurately pay health workers. The launch resulted in Queensland Health staff not being paid, being underpaid, or overpaid, for several months and a 10-times increase in manual payroll processing required. The contracts of several Queensland Health senior executives were terminated, and the total delivery and remediation costs for the project ballooned to over $1.2 billion.

=== 2023 payroll corrections ===
In March 2023, Queensland Health internal auditing found that there had been further payroll issues relating to certain industrial awards being entered incorrectly into the system. Health Minister Yvette D'Ath clarified to parliament that for the majority of affected staff were overpaid by less than a dollar and that the government would not require staff to repay the balance. A limited number of staff received larger overpayments, however only up to $100.

An audit of all Queensland Health payroll during the affected period has been announced and is expected to be completed by the end of June 2023. It is expected that some underpayments, with a value of several million dollars, will be uncovered. Payment corrections (additional pay) is occurring in batches of 50 employees, to allow for payments to begin before the end of the audit.

An external audit of the system found that the industrial awards and instruments have since been corrected and are compliant with Australian and Queensland workplace laws.

=== Vaccine ===
The QoVAX Safety and Efficacy Statewide Study, designed to evaluate immune effects and long-term outcomes of long Covid and COVID-19 vaccines, collected 100,000 biological samples and 11,000,000 data points from 10,000 individuals across Queensland. In 2023 the study was defunded without explanation by the Queensland government, and the project leader was purged. And the initiative was shut down, data collection halted, and government webpages related to the project was taken down. In March 2025 Metro North Health announced that they would abandon the project altogether. The destruction of the QoVAX biobank and dataset sparked criticism from researchers and lawmakers – experts called for reviving the QoVAX project. Queensland Senator Gerard Rennick said that destroying the records discontinued essential research into vaccine-injury causes.

== See also ==
- Biosecurity in Australia
- Health care in Australia
- Queensland Ambulance Service
