= Metro North Health =

Local health service in Queensland, Australia

Metro North Hospital and Health Service

Health service overview
- Jurisdiction: Queensland Government
- Annual budget: ▲ A$3.36 billion (2021–22)
- Health service executive: Nick Steele, Chief executive
- Parent department: Department of Health
- Website: metronorth.health.qld.gov.au

Metro North Hospital and Health Service, known as Metro North HHS or as Metro North Health, is the most populous public health district in Queensland and the overarching health service for the statewide tertiary facility, the Royal Brisbane and Women's Hospital. The service operates several hospitals, dental facilities, and community health services in Brisbane and the surrounds, including the covering the area north of the Brisbane River through to Kilcoy. Metro North Health is part of the Queensland Health system.

As a HHS under Queensland's public health legislation, Metro North Health is under direction from its Hospital and Health Board. The board has certain powers and requirements under the Hospital and Health Boards Act 2011 and Hospital and Health Boards Regulation 2012, which relate to its functions under Australia's universal health system and the 2011 National Health Reform Agreement.

== Hospitals ==
=== Herston Health Precinct ===
The Herson Health Precinct is an area of Herston, Brisbane where multiple medical facilities and research organisations are co-located. The precinct houses approximately 13,000 staff and includes:

- Royal Brisbane and Women's Hospital (RBWH) campus
- Surgical, Treatment and Rehabilitation Service (STARS), completed in 2020
- QIMR Berghofer
- University of Queensland (UQ) Herston campus (medical and dental programs)
- Nucleus Network
- Genetic Health Queensland
- Pathology Queensland Central Laboratory
- Clinical Skills Development Service
- UniLodge Herston
- and several other clinical and medical research organisations.

Development of the precinct begun in 2017 with the A$1.1 billion Herston Quarter investment, with Herston Quarter expected to be completed by 2027.

==== Royal Brisbane and Women's Hospital ====
The Royal Brisbane & Women's Hospital (RBWH) is the largest public hospital in Queensland, with a total of 955 beds and almost 10,000 staff. RBWH provides specialist inpatient and outpatient services in all major specialities, including cancer care and maternity, as well as state-wide emergency and trauma services. As the state tertiary referral hospital, RBWH accounts for approximately 10% of all public hospital services in Queensland and provides services to patients from New South Wales and the Northern Territory where they are not available locally.

From 1 October 2022 to 1 January 2023, RBWH provided 145,126 specialist outpatient appointments, saw 21,952 patients through the Emergency and Trauma Centre, and performed 2,724 elective surgery procedures.

==== Surgical, Treatment and Rehabilitation Service ====
The Surgical, Treatment and Rehabilitation Service (STARS) is a specialist public hospital, located along the southern portion of the Herston Quarter. STARS has 182 inpatient beds, consisting of specialist rehabilitation services and a surgical ward. The hospital provides short-stay surgical procedures through seven operating theatres and three endoscopy suites, as well as specialist outpatient and day hospital care.

=== Redcliffe Hospital ===
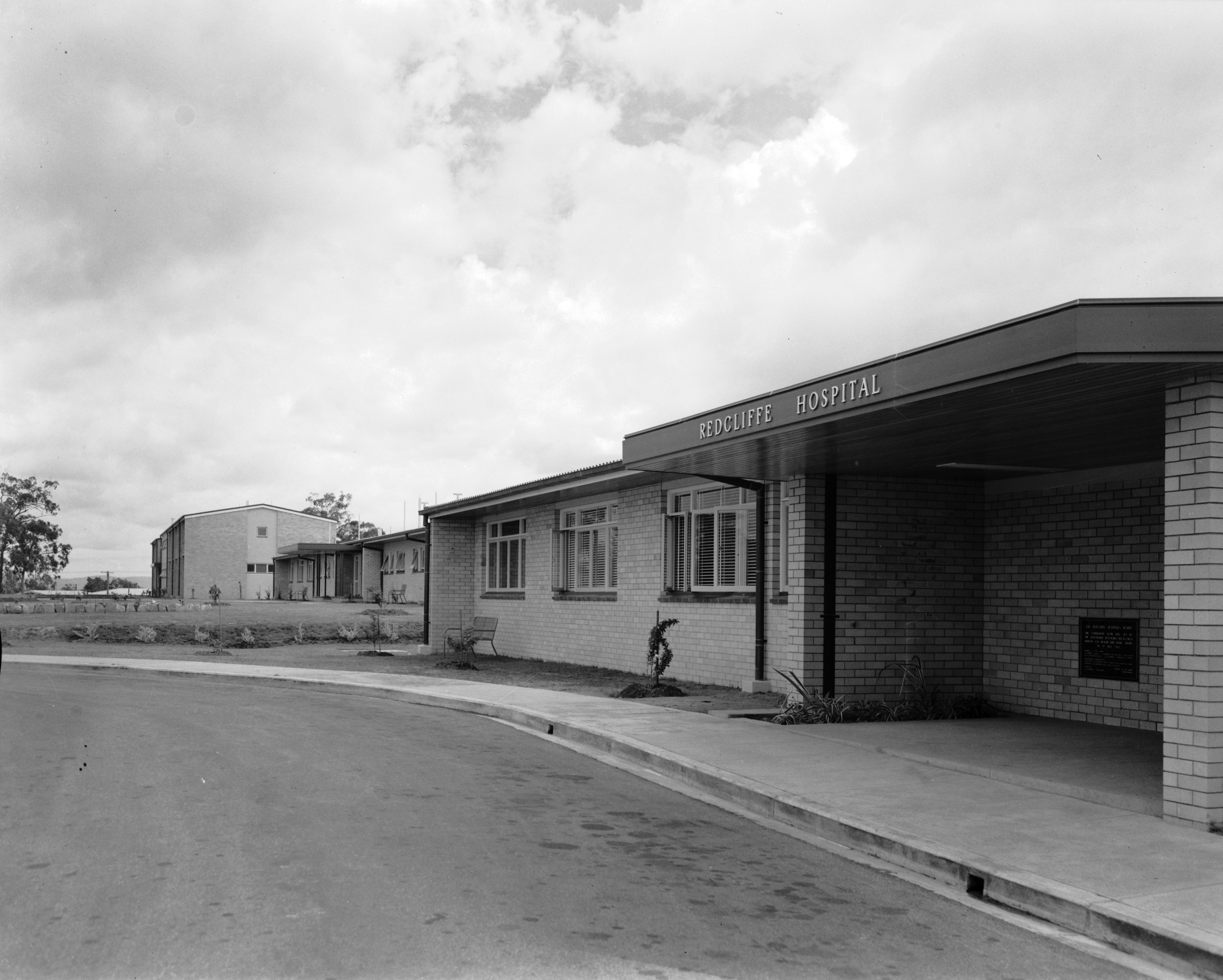
New Redcliffe Hospital, circa 1965

Redcliffe Hospital opened in 1965.

=== Woodford Correctional Health Service ===
Woodford Correctional Health Service is the Metro North outreach service at the Woodford Correctional Centre. Under an agreement with Queensland Corrective Service, Queensland Health through Metro North provides primary health services to inmates and staff.

=== Community and Oral Health ===
The Community and Oral Health (COH) Directorate operates a large number of community health centres, post-acute care services, rehabilitation and residential facilities:

- North Lakes Health Precinct
- Brighton Health Campus
- Caboolture King St Community Health Centre
- North West Community Health Centre
- Nundah Community Health Centre
- Pine Rivers Community Health Centre
- Redcliffe Community Health Centre
- Chermside Community Health Centre
- Zillmere Residential Transitional Care
- Cooinda House
- Halwyn Centre

The Rosemount Hospital Campus at Cartwright Street, Windsor, used to be a specialist rehabilitation and geriatrics service before these services were transferred to the new Surgical, Treatment and Rehabilitation Service. The campus has since been converted in part to corporate and support service offices, such as office space for the Metro North Public Health Unit. Aspley Community Centre does not provide health services anymore, and instead houses the Central Patient Intake Unit.
