= Macrossan =

Macrossan may refer to:

== People ==
- Hugh Denis Macrossan (1881–1940), Australian politician and judge
- John Macrossan (1832–1891), Australian politician
- John Murtagh Macrossan (judge) (1930–2008), Australian judge
- Neal Macrossan (1889–1955), Australian lawyer and judge

== Places ==
- Macrossan, Queensland, Australia
