= 1987 New Year Honours (Australia) =

The New Year Honours 1987 were appointments by Queen Elizabeth II to various orders and honours to reward and highlight good works by citizens of those countries, and honorary ones to citizens of other countries. They were announced on 31 December 1988 to celebrate the year passed and mark the beginning of 1989 in Australia

== Knight Bachelor ==
- The Honourable Mr. Justice Dormer George Andrews, Chief Justice of Queensland.
- Leo Arthur Hielscher, Under Treasurer of Queensland.

== Order of St Michael and St George ==
=== Companion (CMG) ===
- Dr. Russell Walker Strong. For service to the medical profession.

== Order of the British Empire ==
=== Commander (CBE) ===
- Dr. Michael James Conomos. For service to the community.
- David Vincent Gunn. For public and community service.

=== Officers (OBE) ===
- Robert Keith Boughen. For service to music.
- James Christian Carey. For service to the legal profession and the community.
- Dr. Kevin Patrick Kennedy. For service to medicine.
- Ronald Ewan McMaster. For service to the building industry.
- Olga Phyllis, Mrs. Mor. For service to the sport of lawn bowls.
- Maxwell Thomas Bushby, lately Speaker of the House of Assembly.

=== Members (MBE) ===
- Alan Norman Bray. For service to the community.
- Joan, Mrs. Willoughby Joyce. For service to the community.
- Sydney Lingard. For service to the sport of lawn bowls.
- Dr. Victor Roy Luck. For service to the community.
- Margaret Ellen, Mrs. Pidgeon. For service to the building industry.
- Norman Vincent Rice. For service to bee-keeping industry.
- Sister Mary Dorothea Sheehan, R.S.M. For services to nursing.
- William James Gunn. For service to agriculture and the community.
- Trevor George Hodge. For service to disabled children.

== Imperial Service Order ==
- Donald George Young. For public service.
- Lloyd A. Koerbin. For service to industry.

== British Empire Medal ==
- Marjorie Dora, Mrs. Anderson. For service to the community.
- Betty Alma, Mrs. Bennett. For service to the community.
- Dr. Ailcie Meredith Foxton. For service to the community.
- Miss Jane Hickling. For service to the community.
- Winifred Isobel, Mrs. Lloyd. For service to the community in particular the blind.
- Thomas Walker McLucas. For service to the community.
- Donald Malcolm McPherson. For service to the community.
- Dorothy, Mrs. Nicholson. For service to the community.
- Michael Bernard Ryalls. For service to the community.
- Joyce Helena Averina, Mrs. Savage. For service to the community.
- George Shaw. For service to the community.
- Ernest Leonard Young. For service to the community.
- Terence Ralph Avery. For service to the community.
- Robert Hilton Barratt. For services to agriculture and the community.
- Ellen Minnie (Nell), Mrs. Pascoe. For social welfare work.

== Queen's Police Medal ==
- John Malachi Donoghue, Assistant Commissioner, Queensland Police Force.
- Harold Leslie Southern, Inspector, Tasmania Police Force.

== Queen's Fire Service Medal ==
- James Moore, Chief Fire Safety Officer, State Fire Service.
