= Alan Mansfield =

Australian barrister and judge

Sir Alan Mansfield KCMG, KCVO, KStJ
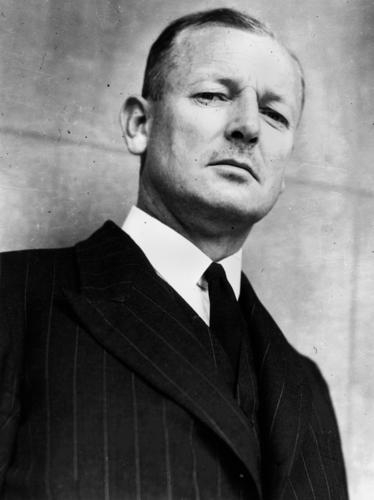
- Justice Alan Mansfield in Brisbane, 1945

18th Governor of Queensland
- In office 21 March 1966 – 21 March 1972
- Monarch: Elizabeth II
- Premier: Sir Frank Nicklin (1966–68); Jack Pizzey (1968); Gordon Chalk (1968); Joh Bjelke-Petersen (1968–72)
- Preceded by: Sir Henry Abel Smith
- Succeeded by: Sir Colin Hannah

10th Chief Justice of Queensland
- In office 9 February 1956 – 21 February 1966
- Premier: Vince Gair (1956–57); Frank Nicklin (1957–66)
- Preceded by: Neal Macrossan
- Succeeded by: William Mack

Personal details
- Born: 30 September 1902 Indooroopilly, Queensland
- Died: 17 July 1980 (aged 77) Benowa, Queensland
- Education: University of Sydney

Sir Alan James Mansfield, KCMG, KCVO, KStJ (30 September 1902 – 17 July 1980) was an Australian barrister, judge, and the 18th Governor of Queensland, serving from 1966 until 1972.

== Early life ==
Mansfield was born on 20 September 1902 in Brisbane, Queensland, where his family had land in Gumdale. He lived in the Mount Gravatt area for many years. Sir James Mansfield was his great-great-grandfather. He was educated at the Anglican Church Grammar School in Brisbane, before winning a scholarship to the Sydney Church of England Grammar School (Shore). He attended university at St Paul's College, University of Sydney.

== Judicial career ==
Mansfield was appointed as a Puisne Judge on the Supreme Court of Queensland on 17 May 1940. He chaired (1942-44) the Land Appeal Court. He served with distinction as a Puisne Judge until he was made a Senior Puisne Judge on 20 March 1947. As a Senior Puisne Judge, he served until 8 February 1956 when he was promoted to the position of Chief Justice of Queensland. He served as Chief Justice from 9 February 1956 until his retirement on 21 February 1966.

== Vice-regal career ==
During his time as Chief Judge, Mansfield was Lieutenant-Governor of Queensland on several occasions. Between 25 January 1957 and March 1958 he acted as administrator for Queensland. He was appointed Governor of Queensland in 1966. He served in this position until 1972.

Mansfield was a freemason. During his term as governor, he was also Grand Master of the Grand Lodge of Queensland.

== Other professional achievements ==
On 22 July 1924 Mansfield was admitted to the Queensland Bar. The Australian Federal government chose him as a member of the Australian commission of investigation into war crimes, in London. He represented Australia as the Chief Prosecutor on the International Military Tribunal for the Far East for the United Nations War Crimes Commission May 3, 1946, to November 12, 1948.

Between 1956-1965 he served as Warden of the University of Queensland

In 1966, in addition to his other duties, Mansfield was also appointed Chancellor of the University of Queensland he served in the role until 1976.

== Honours ==
- In 1958 Mansfield was made a Knight Commander of the Order of St Michael and St George (KCMG).
- In 1966 Mansfield was made a Knight of the Most Venerable Order of St John (KStJ)
- In 1970 Mansfield was made a Knight Commander of the Royal Victorian Order (KCVO)
- The suburb of Mansfield in the city of Brisbane is named after him.
- Honorary LL.D. University of Queensland 1970.
- He was commissioned as an Honorary Colonel of the 2/14 Queensland Mounted Infantry
- He was commissioned as an Honorary Air Commodore of the 23rd Squadron of the Citizen Air Force.

== See also ==
- Judiciary of Australia
- List of Judges of the Supreme Court of Queensland

Legal offices
Preceded by Neal Macrossan	Chief Justice of Queensland; 1956–1966	Succeeded by William Mack
Government offices
Preceded by Sir Henry Abel Smith	Governor of Queensland; 1966–1972	Succeeded by Sir Colin Hannah
Academic offices
Preceded by Sir Albert Axon	Chancellor of the University of Queensland; 1966–1976	Succeeded by Sir Walter Campbell
