= Constitution of Queensland =

State constitution of Queensland, Australia

- Coat of Arms of Queensland
- Created: 28 December 1867
- System: Parliamentary democracy under a constitutional monarchy

Government structure
- Branches: Legislative: Parliament of Queensland; Executive: Cabinet of Queensland; Judiciary: Courts of Queensland
- Chambers: Legislative Assembly of Queensland
- Executive: De jure: Monarch of Australia as represented by the Governor of Queensland acting through the Executive Council; De facto: Cabinet (premier and ministers)
- Judiciary: Supreme Court of Queensland and other lower courts
- Federalism: State within Australia
- Entrenchments: 6 (all provisions within the Constitution Act 1867 (Qld))
- Citation: Constitution of Queensland 2001 (Qld); Constitution Act 1867 (Qld)
- Supersedes: Australian Constitutions Act 1850 (Imp); New South Wales Constitution Act 1855 (Imp)

The Constitution of Queensland sets out and regulates the powers of the major state institutions of the Australian state of Queensland. It is a written constitution, with most provisions contained within the Constitution of Queensland 2001 (Qld), which consolidated many previous constitutional laws. However, it does not contain all the constitutional principles of the state, with the Constitution Act 1867 (Qld), Australia Act 1986 (Cth), Australian Constitution, the governor's commission, the common law and constitutional conventions also relevant constitutional documents.

These constitutional documents set down Queensland as a constitutional monarchy operating under the Westminster system, with a parliament composed of the Legislative Assembly and the King exercising legislative powers, an executive made up of ministers and the premier appointed to act on behalf of the governor, and a judiciary made up of the Supreme Court and other lower courts.

Following the Federation of Australia, the colony of Queensland became a state within the new Commonwealth of Australia and ceded certain powers to the Commonwealth Government. However, except where valid Commonwealth laws conflict with the laws of Queensland, the Parliament of Queensland retains plenary legislative power.

== Function ==
The Constitution defines the structure, powers and function of the three arms of government:

- Legislature: the unicameral Parliament of Queensland, comprising the Legislative Assembly and the King (represented by the governor);
- Executive: the Executive Council of Queensland, which formalises decisions of the Cabinet of Queensland, which is composed of the premier and other ministers of state appointed by the governor on the advice of the premier;
- Judiciary: the Supreme Court and other state courts, whose judges are appointed by the governor on advice of ministers.

The constitution also defines the role of the governor. Under the constitution, governmental authority is nominally vested in the governor of Queensland (currently Jeannette Young) on behalf of the Crown and who is appointed by the Monarch (currently Charles III) on the advice of the Premier of Queensland. The governor's role is mostly ceremonial, however they serve constitutional roles such as, presiding over meetings of the Executive Council, summoning, proroguing and dissolving Parliament on the advice of the Premier, giving Royal Assent to Bills passed by the Parliament, appointing all ministers of state, appointing and removing officials on the advice of the Executive Council, issuing writs for Queensland State Elections and for the election of Queensland representatives in the Australian Senate, on the advice of the Executive Council and granting pardons or commutations.

== History ==
The current constitution is the Constitution of Queensland 2001. It is the state's second constitution, consolidating various constitutional provisions dating back to the 19th century, and in particular the state's first constitution, the Constitution Act 1867.

== Entrenchment and amendments ==
The constitution contains entrenched provisions which can only be amended by way of referendum. It also contains provisions which may be amended by legislation.

== See also ==
- State constitutions in Australia
