= History of public health in Australia =

The History of public health in Australia covers public health in Australia since 1787. The history saw incremental progress against high death rates. The 19th century experience came as a British colony and reflected many characteristics of the history of public health in the United Kingdom. Legislative milestones, scientific breakthroughs, and grassroots advocacy collectively modernized a landscape once dominated by disease and high death rates. Hospitals moved from the periphery to the center of public health services and the national budget. Challenges like bad urban sanitation, epidemics, tuberculosis, and infant mortality were largely resolved by the early 20th century. The article also includes Aboriginal Australians along with Torres Strait Islanders, regarding their severe health conditions.

Australia has faced significant public health issues over the years: When the British established the first colony in 1788, they brought diseases like smallpox, which devastated the Aboriginal population. Health care primarily served convicts and military personnel. The healthcare system had to expand rapidly to accommodate the growing number of convicts and settlers, especially after the massive influx of people in the gold rush of 1850s. Doctors faced shortages of essential supplies and struggled with diseases like scurvy and dysentery. Poor urban sanitation led to frequent epidemics in the 19th century. Hospitals had to deal with outbreaks of diseases like tuberculosis and cholera. Access to healthcare was limited for free settlers until the government began subsidizing medical services in the mid-19th century. This marked a significant shift towards more inclusive healthcare. The 20th century saw significant improvements in public health, with legislative milestones and scientific breakthroughs helping to reduce death rates and improve overall healthcare standards. From the late 19th century onward, Australia had very good public health indicators such as life expectancy.

== Origins ==
=== Aboriginal health ===
Australia was largely isolated from the great epidemic diseases of the rest of the world. In 1788 the British ended that, bringing smallpox and many other germs for which the Aboriginal element had no immunities.

=== British penal colonies 1787–1850 ===
In 1787 the British government shipped 700 prisoners, both male and female, to permanent exile in the new possession of Australia. They were accompanied by 400 guards and three physicians. Navy ships kept arriving for the next six decades, bringing 160,000 men and women convicted of minor crimes. Many became very sick en route; many had died on the 9-month journey and were buried at sea. Others died when they were exposed to Australia's unfamiliar disease environment. It was not a new phenomena: European settlers in the warmer American colonies in the 17th and 18th century had very high death rates. Dr. John White played a crucial role in establishing the Colonial Medical Service with basic medical care for everyone. He opened the first hospital for prisoners in 1788. It was greatly expanded it by 1811, as thousands more convicts poured in as well as hundreds of doctors. However, smallpox, scurvy and dysentery were constant companions and did not have cures. The large convict population had free professional medical care through doctors and hospitals.

Most of the prisoners who served out their time (called "Emancipist") remained in Australia. The most famous was William Redfern, a ship's surgeon in the Royal Navy who had been convicted of mutiny. He became a leader of the medical community.

Owning a farm was virtually impossible for poor people back home, but now farmland was practically free. There were very attractive terms for Army officers guarding the convicts and they soon established farms and a new upper class for Australia.

=== Sydney hospitals ===
According to Peter Hobbins, from 1835 to 1855, Sydney took the lead in the expansion and transformation of health care. Hospital access had long been limited to convicts and the military. In 1836, the government began subsidizing medical services for free settlers. Innovation came at the small Sydney Dispensary, which expanded into the Sydney Infirmary and Dispensary in 1843. Patients stayed on average 8 weeks. Adults suffered from rheumatism, syphilis, leg ulcers, and bronchitis. Children under 12 were brought in suffering from influenza, diphtheria, scarlet fever, whooping cough and typhoid fever. As patient totals quadrupled to 4,000, the infirmary was complemented by the treasury-funded Vaccine Institution. It provided free outpatient medical care for the city's poor. Their chief demand was relief from heartburn, rheumatism, syphilis, worms, and gonorrhoea. Dr. Haynes Gibbes Alleyne in 1852 introduced the use of chloroform in amputations at the Sydney Infirmary. He became a prominent public health official and led the suppression of smallpox epidemics in 1876 and 1881. Although the government refused to mandate smallpox vaccination, the medical community became leaders in promoting the government's broader goal of creating a "moral and charitable quarantine" around its vulnerable citizens. This policy of "betterment" went beyond healthcare, contributing to the development of Sydney as a self-governing community that increasingly relied on the power of a centralized state. Furthermore, the status achieved by Sydney hospitals in 1848 became the standard for all hospitals in NSW by the Hospitals Partial Incorporation Act. This Act set up the legal foundation of the hospital systems throughout Australia.

=== Catholic hospitals ===
The Catholic Church, with a base largely in the Irish community, brought in three orders of sisters from Ireland: Sisters of Charity of Australia, Sisters of St John of God. and Sisters of the Little Company of Mary. They opened ten hospitals in the 19th century, and others since then. Sister Mary Baptist De Lacy of the Sister of Charity order arrived in 1838 to serve women convicts. She founded and managed a hospital in Woolloomooloo in the Sydney suburbs until she returned to Ireland in 1859. St Vincent's Hospital, Sydney was opened in 1857 by the Sisters of Charity of Australia as a free hospital for the poor. St Joseph's Hospital, Auburn, was founded in 1886 by the Sisters of Charity; it was the first hospital in Australia focused on treating tuberculosis. It closed in 2023. Amy Vera Ackman, known as Mother Giovanni (1886–1966), was a recent leader in hospital administration.

== 1850–1901 ==
In the 1850s the transportation of criminals ended. Gold was discovered and the population tripled in the 1850s. Australians boasted about living in "A Working man's paradise." Wages were indeed higher, but there was poverty as well. To explore this boast, Historians have collected data on the death rates for infectious diseases (tuberculosis—called "phthisis" at the time; typhoid; diarrhea; dysentery; and cholera). They compared the three largest Australian cities (Sydney, Melbourne, and Brisbane) with the three largest English cities (London, Birmingham, and Leeds). From 1880 to 1900, the British cities had 34% higher death rates. In 1901–1905, infant mortality in London was 33% higher than Sydney.

New South Wales (NSW), centred on Sydney, maintained its lead among the colonies in public health matters. In the 1850s NSW began colony-wide health administration, focusing on infectious diseases and sanitation using British models. In 1881 the first NSW Board of Health was established as a response to the smallpox epidemic under the provisions of the Infectious Diseases Supervision Act. It required local authorities to write written reports detailing both public health statistics and administrative progress. In 1896 the first Public Health Act in NSW strengthened the Board. In 1902 a revised law consolidated existing powers.

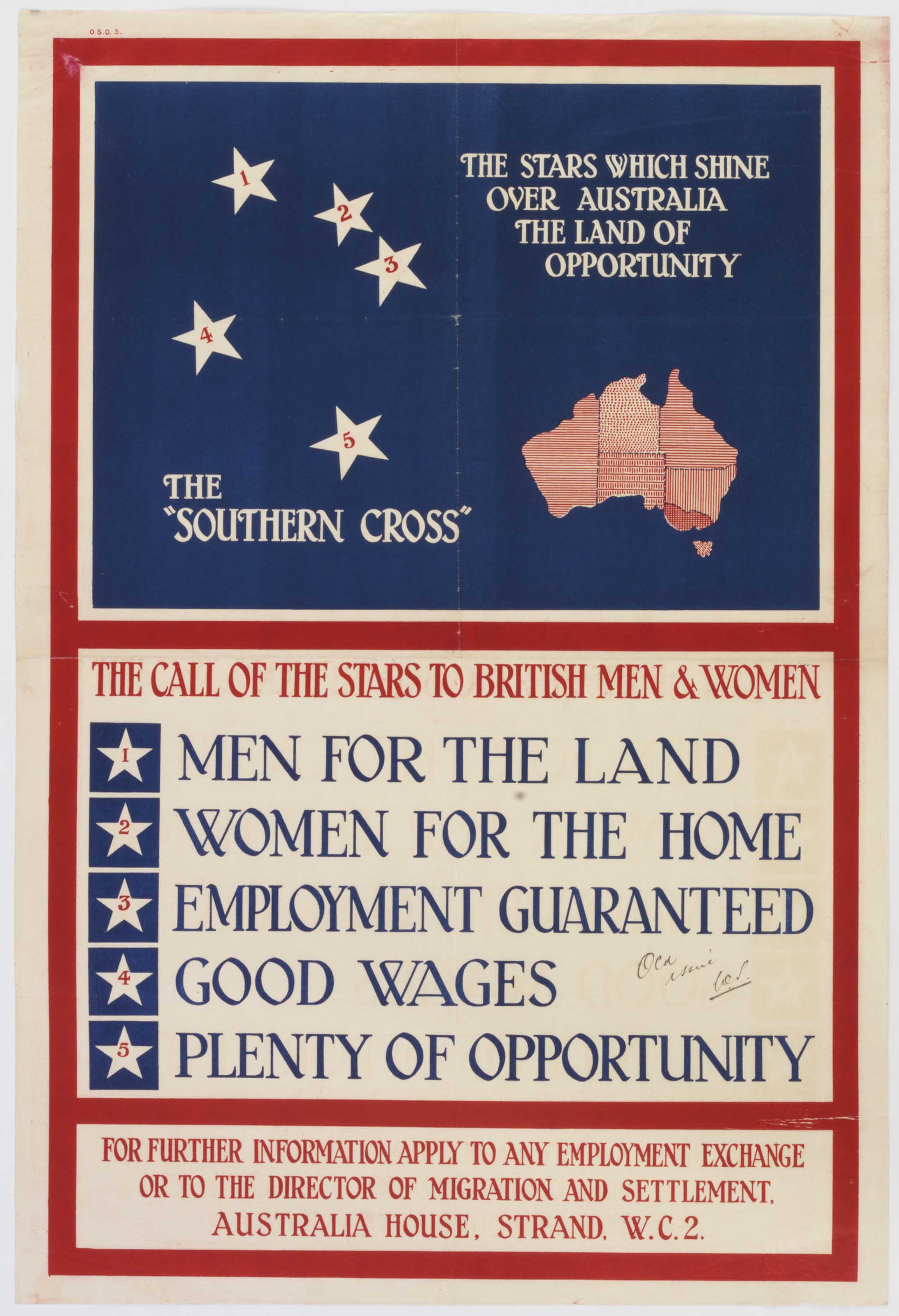
Australian Government poster issued in 1928 by the Overseas Settlement Office to attract Brits to "the land of opportunity."

== 20th century ==
In World War I (1914–1918), 59,000 Australian men were killed in action or died of wounds with about 13% of this total coming in the disastrous Gallipoli campaign against Turkey.

=== Spanish Flu ===
Australia limited the impact of the 1918–1919 global "Spanish flu" pandemic by vigorous quarantine at the national, state and local levels. Its death rate was one of the lowest in the world.

Influenza entered Australia for the first time in January 1919 after a strict maritime quarantine had shielded the country through 1918. It assumed epidemic proportions first in Melbourne, peaking in mid-February. The flu soon appeared in neighboring New South Wales and South Australia. New South Wales experienced its first wave of infection between mid-March and late May, while a second, more severe wave occurred in Victoria between April and June. Land quarantine measures hindered the spread of the disease. Queensland was not infected until late April; Western Australia avoided the disease until early June, and Tasmania remained free from it until mid-August. Out of the six states, Victoria and New South Wales experienced generally more extensive epidemics. Each experienced another significant wave of illness over the winter. The second epidemic in New South Wales was more severe than the first, while Victoria saw a third wave that was somewhat less extensive than its second, more akin to its first.

=== 1920s ===
In 1921 the national government created the Department of Health following the Spanish flu pandemic, with Dr. John Cumpston as its first director. This marked a significant shift towards national health management. At first the department dealt with quarantines; infectious disease reports; public health research laboratories; and occupational health. The 1944 Pharmaceutical Benefits Act set up cash subsidies for expensive drugs and reflected growing popular demand for subsidies of everyday medical care.

=== Life expectancy ===

The steady upward trend in life expectancy resembles the trend in Britain. However, since 1900 conditions have been more favorable. in Australia. This is probably thanks to less industrialisation, lower population density, better nutrition and fewer war casualties.

- Late 19th Century: Life expectancy at birth was 47.2 years for males and 50.8 years for females during the period 1881–1890.
- Early 20th Century: By the early 1900s, life expectancy had increased slightly. For example, in 1900, males at birth could be expected to live 53.8 years, while females would live 58.8 years. The main change is the steady decline of infant mortality. For life expectancy after age 10, the historical improvements are much smaller.
- Pre-1930: Improvements in living conditions, such as better water supplies, sewerage systems, and health education, and maternal care contributed to lower death rates and increased life expectancy.
- 21st Century: By 2020–2022, life expectancy had increased to 81.2 years for males and 85.3 years for females. However, there was a slight decrease in life expectancy in recent years due to setbacks, especially COVID-1967.
- Advances in healthcare and sanitation have significantly reduced infant mortality rates.
- Improved public health measures – such as sewers and no-spitting rules – and new drugs after 1945 have reduced deaths from infectious diseases, especially tuberculosis and pneumonia.
- Advertising and publicity campaigns in the late 20th century reduced cigarette smoking and careless automobile driving.
- Advances in drugs: After 1940, many powerful new drugs especially sulfonamide, streptomycin and penicillin.

== 21st century ==
The long political battle between left and right has resulted in a compromise that includes both private system (with insurance, doctors and hospitals) as well as a tax-funded public system.

The public healthcare spending in financial year 2024–2025 is projected to be around AUD 112.7 billion. About 15 million people hold private health insurance; they paid $29.9 billion in premiums in 2023–2024. This does not include Out of Pocket (OOP) expenses paid by individuals, or the $7.6 billion private health insurance rebate they will receive from Canberra.

Australia does very well in international comparison of health care statistics among developed countries. In 2010 it scored in the top one-third of the 29 OECD (Organisation for Economic Cooperation and Development) nations in terms of 30 health indicators. Its few exceptions included obesity and infant mortality rate. It ranked first on several indicators, including life expectancy, and non-smoking. In 2022 it outranked all of Europe on life expectancy.

=== Medibank ===
Medibank is the nation's largest private health insurance provider, covering around 4.2 million customers in 2024. Medibank initially started as an Australian Government not-for-profit insurer in 1976, before becoming for-profit in 2009 under the Rudd Government and privatised by the Abbott government in 2014.

=== Medicare ===
Medicare is the publicly funded federal government program that has provided universal health care since 1984 for all citizens and some visitors. It covers all of the cost of public hospital services. It also covers some health services provided by GPs and medical specialists such as physiotherapy, community nurses and basic dental services for children. Medicare's Pharmaceutical Benefits Scheme (PBS) lowers the price of some prescription medicines.

=== COVID-19 pandemic 2020–2022 ===
Australia used its 1918 experience to promptly impose severe quarantine restrictions when Covid epidemic appeared in 2020. International and inter-state travel was strictly limited. Thousands were abroad and unable to return home; families that crossed state lines could not get together. However, in terms of stopping the importation and domestic spread of the disease, the policy worked. In the end Australia had relatively low rates of infections and death.

=== Catholic hospitals ===
Catholic Health Australia is today the largest non-government provider grouping of health, community and aged care services in Australia. These do not operate for profit and range across the full spectrum of health services, representing about 10% of the health sector and employing 35,000 people. They remain heavily involved in community activities including education, health services, chaplaincy to prisons, rest homes, and hospitals, social justice, and human rights advocacy.

== Historic population estimates ==
 Historic population (estimated)

Pre-1788
Year	Indigenous population	±%
pre 1788	300,000 to 1,000,000	—

Settlement – Federation
Year	Non-indigenous population	±% p.a.
1788	859	—
1798	4,588	+18.24%
1808	10,263	+8.38%
1818	25,859	+9.68%
1828	58,197	+8.45%
1838	151,868	+10.07%
1848	332,328	+8.15%
1858	1,050,828	+12.20%
1868	1,539,552	+3.89%
1878	2,092,164	+3.11%
1888	2,981,677	+3.61%
1898	3,664,715	+2.08%

Post-Federation
Year	Total population	±%
1901	3,788,123	—
1906	4,059,083	+7.2%
1911	4,489,545	+10.6%
1916	4,943,173	+10.1%
1921	5,455,136	+10.4%
1926	6,056,360	+11.0%
1931	6,526,485	+7.8%
1936	6,778,372	+3.9%
1941	7,109,898	+4.9%
1946	7,465,157	+5.0%
1951	8,421,775	+12.8%
1956	9,425,563	+11.9%
1961	10,548,267	+11.9%
1966	11,599,498	+10.0%
1971	13,067,265	+12.7%
1976	14,033,083	+7.4%
1981	14,923,260	+6.3%
1986	16,018,350	+7.3%
1991	17,284,036	+7.9%
1996	18,224,767	+5.4%
2001	18,769,249	+3.0%
2006	19,855,288	+5.8%
2011	21,507,717	+8.3%
2016	23,401,892	+8.8%
2021	25,417,978	+8.6%
Note: Estimated populations prior to 1961 do not include the Indigenous population. Source:

== See also ==
- Indigenous health in Australia
- Demographics of Australia
- Minister for Health (New South Wales)
- Medibank, largest private insurer since 1976
- Medicare (Australia), the public system
- Sydney Hospital, founded 1788
- List of hospitals in Australia

=== Leaders ===
- John White (1756–1832) Surgeon-General of New South Wales from 1788
- William Redfern (1775–1833), emancipist who became a leading surgeon
- D'Arcy Wentworth (1762–1827), physician; settler
- Haynes Gibbes Alleyne (1813–1882), public health official
- John Cumpston (1880–1954), first Director-General of the Australian Government's Department of Health, 1921–1945.
- Amy Vera Ackman, known as Mother Giovanni (1886–1966), Catholic hospital administrator and one of the Sisters of Charity.
