= Eunice Hanger =

Australian playwright and educator

- Born: 8 March 1911; Mount Chalmers, Queensland, Australia
- Died: 16 October 1972 (aged 61); Toowong, Queensland, Australia
- Education: University of Queensland
- Occupations: Playwright, lecturer
- Relatives: Mostyn Hanger, brother

Eunice Hanger (8 March 1911 – 16 October 1972) was an Australian playwright and educator.

== Early life and education ==
Eunice Hanger was born at Mount Chalmers in Queensland on 8 March 1911 to parents Thomas Hanger and Myfanwy Granville-Jones. Her older brother, Mostyn Hanger, became Chief Justice of Queensland and was knighted. She completed her secondary education at Gympie High School and won a tertiary scholarship. She then attended the University of Queensland, graduating with a BA in 1932 and MA in 1939.

== Career ==
Qualified with her BA, Hanger began her teaching career at Gympie High School, where her father was headmaster. While teaching at Roma High School, she was one of five teachers who went on a tour to study education in Japan, reporting that "suicides from despair at failure in the all-important examination are not at all uncommon".

In 1940 she was transferred to Rockhampton High School and in 1948 was promoted to Brisbane High School.

Her 1949 stage adaptation of M. Barnard Eldershaw's A House Is Built was not well received, despite having received the authors' approval. Nelson Burns, in his review for The Courier-Mail, wrote "An over-plus of trite verbiage cluttered the trend of the story". The following year, however, she had the audience "enthralled" by her play, The Summoner, which she produced and performed in.

In 1955 her play Flood was runner-up to Oriel Gray's The Torrents and Ray Lawler's Summer of the Seventeenth Doll, joint winners of the Playwrights' Advisory Board's play of the year. It was adapted for radio by Catherine Shepherd.

Hanger died on 16 October 1972 at Toowong, Queensland.

== Selected works ==
- A House is Built, 1949
- The Summoner, 1950
- Upstage, 1950
- Foundations, 1952
- Flood, 1955
- 2D, 1958
- The Frogs, 1960
