= John Murtagh Macrossan (judge) =

John Murtagh Macrossan AC
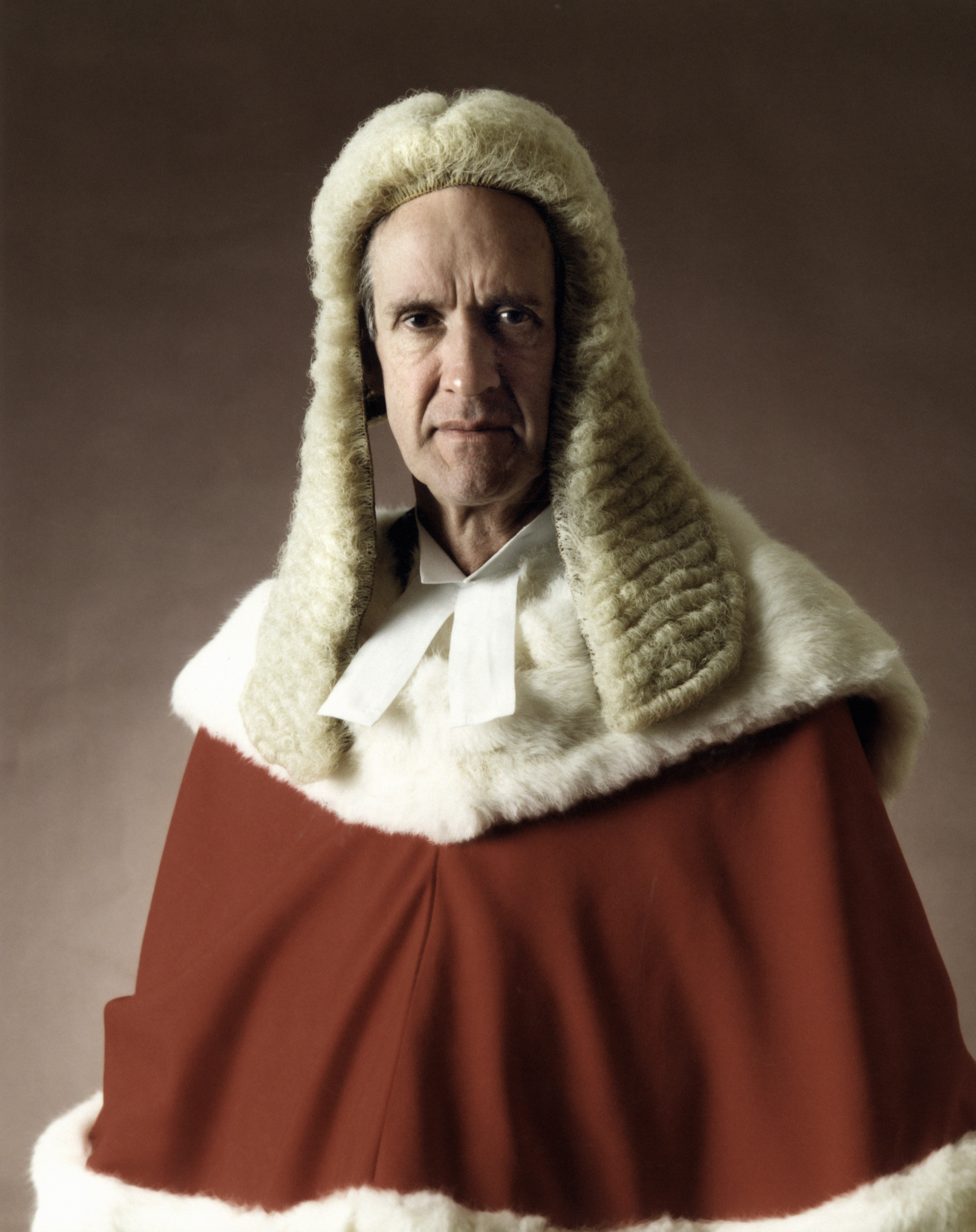
- John Murtagh Macrossan, 1989

16th Chief Justice of Queensland
- In office 10 April 1989 – 16 February 1998
- Preceded by: Dormer Andrews
- Succeeded by: Paul de Jersey

Personal details
- Born: 12 March 1930
- Died: 5 August 2008 (aged 78)
- Spouse: Margery Newton
- Relations: John Macrossan (grandfather), Hugh Macrossan (uncle), Neal Macrossan (uncle)
- Children: Mark Macrossan
- Parents: Vincent Macrossan (father); Dorothy née Brown (mother)
- Occupation: Barrister, Judge, Chief Justice

John Murtagh Macrossan AC (12 March 1930 – 5 August 2008) was a distinguished barrister, chancellor and judge in Queensland, Australia. He was the 16th Chief Justice of Queensland and the third person from the Macrossan family to occupy that position. His grandfather John Murtagh Macrossan was Colonial Secretary for Queensland and his two uncles Hugh Denis Macrossan and Neal William Macrossan were also Chief Justices of Queensland.

== Early years ==
Macrossan was born on 12 March 1930 to Vincent and Dorothy Macrossan (née Brown). He was named after his grandfather of the same name who was member of the Queensland Parliament. He was educated at St Columban’s College in Brisbane by the Christian Brothers. After high school, he went on to study at the University of Queensland where he graduated with a Bachelor of Arts and a LLB. His mother is said to have wanted Macrossan to be a doctor whilst his father wanted him to be solicitor like himself. It was said that Macrossan was widely read, elegantly dressed and immaculately mannered.

== Professional life ==
He was admitted to the Queensland Bar in 1951 but appeared in Court only once before going to the University of Oxford. It was at this appearance where he announced appearing for the wrong party. He attended Exeter College and obtained a Bachelor of Civil Laws. He returned to Queensland in 1954 to resume his career at the Bar. He shared chambers with James Archibald Douglas. He took Silk in 1967. He became the Queensland Government’s favoured senior counsel in industrial cases against the Australian Government. He was fortunate to have the privilege of appearing in the Privy Council.

He was appointed to the Supreme Court of Queensland as a judge in 1980. His appointment was merited. His courtesy on the bench is said to have been "legendary" and he never seemed to lose his temper.

Macrossan was deputy chancellor of Griffith University from 1985. In 1988 he was appointed chancellor and continued as chancellor until 2000. He was made an honorary doctor of the university in 2001.

In 1989 he was appointed Chief Justice of Queensland following the retirement of Sir Dormer Andrews. Whilst he was not the most senior judge at the time, Justices Kelly and Connolly were near retirement, and were happy for Macrossan's elevation.

In 1991 the Queensland Government created a separate Court of Appeal with a president. The court was created with opposition from the Supreme Court and without consultation of the Queensland legal profession. Macrossan was opposed to this course as a similar Court of Appeal set up in New South Wales led to many years of bitter feelings as judges' seniority was interfered with. The legislation setting up this court also removed some of the chief justice's jurisdiction over that court. The work, which the new court performed, was work which the Supreme Court sitting as a Full Court traditionally undertook. Macrossan sustained a discreet battle with the Government to rectify this, which finally occurred in 1997 after the election of a new Government. Macrossan is said to have seen this as his most significant achievement.

Another reform achieved was the termination of the creation of new Queens Counsel. Instead of the Crown appointing the leaders of the Queensland Bar, senior practitioners would be recognised by the title of Senior Counsel.

In 1993 he was made a Companion in the Order of Australia (AC) in recognition of his services to law, education and the arts. In the same year he awarded honorary Doctorate of Laws by the University of Queensland. He was to be knighted in the 1990 New Years Honours List, but the new Queensland State Government blocked this.

He was president of the Queensland Art Gallery Society from 1978 to 1982 and was deputy chancellor of Griffith University from 1985. He was chancellor of that university from 1988 to 2000. He was also involved with the Churchill Trust.

In 1997 he opposed the establishment of a Supreme Court in Cairns as he felt that there was a greater need in Brisbane for a new judge.

He retired in 1998 two years before the statutory retirement age for judges. At Macrossan's retirement ceremony, he said that courts "must always be open to new ideas but not be driven by every wind that blows" and that the community expected stability from the judiciary.

In 2001 he was made an honorary doctor of Griffith University in recognition for his service to the university.

He married Margery Newton in 1961. Their son Mark is a barrister and playwright.

He died in Brisbane on 5 August 2008 aged 78. in Brisbane. Queensland Attorney-General Kerry Shine said of Macrossan "He was a very highly talented and respected judicial officer and barrister" and that he had "served Queensland well". Macrossan's funeral was held at Our Lady of Help of Christians church and he was buried in Nudgee Cemetery.

Legal offices
Preceded by Dormer Andrews	Chief Justice of Queensland; 1989–1998	Succeeded by Paul de Jersey
