= Leneen Forde =

Governor of Queensland from 1992 to 1997

The Honourable Leneen Forde AC DStJ
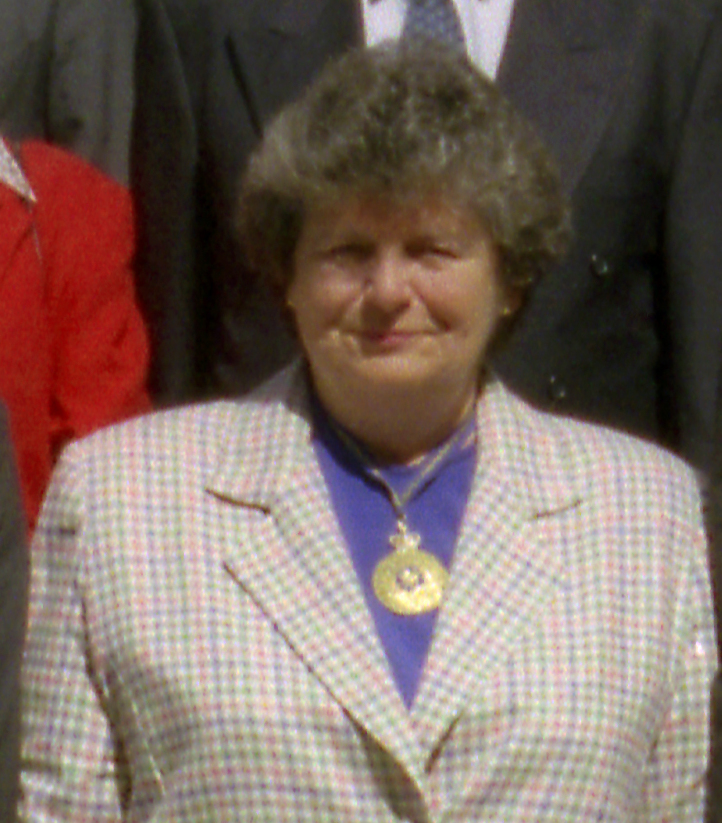

22nd Governor of Queensland
- In office 29 July 1992 – 29 July 1997
- Monarch: Elizabeth II
- Premier: Wayne Goss; Rob Borbidge
- Preceded by: Sir Walter Campbell
- Succeeded by: Peter Arnison

Personal details
- Born: Mary Marguerite Leneen Kavanagh; 12 May 1935 (age 91) Ottawa, Ontario, Canada
- Spouses: Gerald Forde (m. 1955; died 1966) Angus McDonald (m. 1983; died 1993)
- Relations: Frank Forde (father-in-law)
- Education: University of Queensland
- Occupation: Solicitor

Mary Marguerite Leneen Forde, AC DStJ (born 12 May 1935) is a Canadian-born Australian retired solicitor and former Chancellor of Griffith University, who served as the 22nd Governor of Queensland from 1992 until 1997. Forde chaired the Commission of Inquiry into Abuse of Children in Queensland Institutions during 1998 and 1999 which found systemic child abuse in government or non-government institutions between 1911 and 1999.

== Early life ==
Forde was born Mary Marguerite Leneen Kavanagh in Ottawa, Ontario, Canada. She worked as a medical laboratory technician, and studied part-time for a Bachelor of Arts before moving to Australia in 1954. In 1955, she married (Francis) Gerald Forde, the son of Frank Forde, a former Prime Minister of Australia and High Commissioner to Canada. Together, the Fordes had five children. She worked in the Haematology Department of Royal Brisbane Hospital for two years prior to full-time legal study following her husband's death in 1966.

== Career ==
Forde graduated with a Bachelor of Laws from the University of Queensland in 1970, and from 1971 was employed as a solicitor. From 1974 to 1992, she was a partner of Cannan & Peterson, in charge of probate and estates. In 1992, after her appointment as governor, she was the subject of a $500,000 civil lawsuit from the Fitzgerald family, heirs of the Castlemaine Perkins beer empire, who alleged she had engaged in professional misconduct to their detriment. The Supreme Court of Queensland found that she was not liable for damages.

Forde was international president of women's service organisation Zonta International from 1990 to 1992. In March 1992 she was announced as the inaugural head of the Queensland Women's Consultative Council.

== Governor of Queensland ==
In 1992, Forde was only the second woman to be appointed to the position of governor of an Australian state (after Dame Roma Mitchell who became Governor of South Australia in 1991) and the first to take on the role in Queensland.

Forde had remarried a retired detective superintendent from New South Wales Police, Angus McDonald, in 1983. McDonald served as vice-regal consort and was the first male spouse of a governor in Australia. Forde retired as governor in 1997.

== Forde Inquiry ==
In 1998, Forde was appointed to chair the Commission of Inquiry into Abuse of Children in Queensland Institutions. Forde handed the report to the Queensland Government in May 1999. The Inquiry covered 159 institutions from 1911 to 1999 and found abuse had occurred and made 42 recommendations relating to contemporary child protection practices, youth justice and redress of past abuse. The Inquiry resulted in reconciliation initiatives including apologies, commemorative memorials and events, establishment and delivery of the Queensland Government Redress Scheme, establishment of the Forde Foundation Trust Fund, and establishment of community-based support services.

== Honours ==
On 26 January 1993, Forde was appointed a Companion of the Order of Australia in recognition of her service to the law, to improving the status of women and to economic and business development. Forde is a Dame of Grace in the Order of St. John of Jerusalem. She was International President of Zonta from 1990 until 1992, and 1991 Queenslander of the Year.

Government offices
Preceded by Sir Walter Campbell	Governor of Queensland; 1992–1997	Succeeded by Peter Arnison
