= William Mack (judge) =

Barrister and judge in Queensland, Australia

Sir William Mack KBE
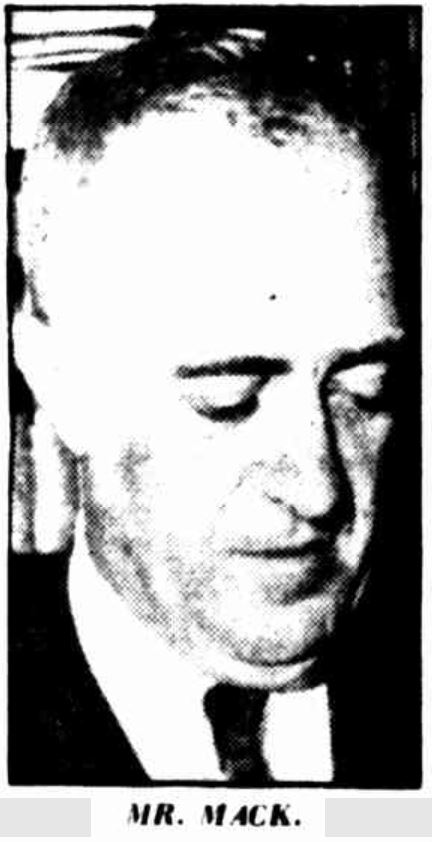
- William George Mack, 1950

11th Chief Justice of Queensland
- In office 24 February 1966 – 12 May 1971
- Premier: Sir Frank Nicklin
- Governor: Sir Henry Abel Smith
- Preceded by: Alan Mansfield
- Succeeded by: Mostyn Hanger

Personal details
- Born: 26 November 1904 Mount Perry, Queensland, Australia
- Died: 26 July 1979 (aged 75)
- Spouse: Ida Mocatta
- Parents: Albert George Mack (father); Martha née Kennedy (mother)
- Occupation: Barrister, Judge, Chief Justice

Sir William George Albert Mack KBE (1904–1979) was a barrister and judge in Queensland, Australia. He was Chief Justice of the Supreme Court of Queensland from 1966 to 1971. He also served as Administrator of Queensland (deputy for the Governor of Queensland) on two occasions.

== Administrator of Queensland ==
Mack served as Administrator of Queensland from 10 March 1966 to 21 March 1966 and again on 20 March 1969 to 30 June 1969.

Legal offices
| Preceded by Alan Mansfield | Chief Justice of Queensland; 1966-1971 | Succeeded by Mostyn Hanger |
