= Dormer Andrews =

Australian judge (1919–2004)

The Honourable Sir Dormer George Andrews BA, LLB

15th Chief Justice of Queensland
- In office 8 July 1985 – 9 April 1989
- Premier: Sir Joh Bjelke-Petersen
- Preceded by: Walter Campbell
- Succeeded by: John Macrossan

Personal details
- Born: 8 April 1919 Brisbane, Queensland
- Died: 28 June 2004 (aged 85)
- Spouse: Joan Merle Tear
- Education: University of Queensland

Military service
- Allegiance: UK, Australia
- Branch/service: Royal Air Force, RAAF
- Years of service: 1940–1944
- Rank: Sergeant Pilot
- Unit: 107 Squadron
- Battles/wars: El Alamein, Second World War

Sir Dormer George (Bob) Andrews (8 April 1919 – 28 June 2004) was a judge in Queensland, Australia. He was the Chief Justice of the Supreme Court of Queensland.

== Education and military service ==
Andrews was born in Brisbane. He attended Taringa State primary school and St Joseph's College, Nudgee before enrolling at the University of Queensland in 1939. In 1940, he enlisted in the Royal Air Force, first in No. 61 OTU in Britain and then in No. 127 Squadron in the Western Desert. In October 1942, the Hurricane fighter he was flying was shot down and he sustained severe injuries that resulted in the loss of his left arm. He was held prisoner by the Italians until he was liberated and repatriated in June 1943.

He resumed his university study and graduated with a Bachelor of Arts in 1944 and a Bachelor of Law in 1947.

== Legal career ==
He did articles at the firm of Williams and Williams and was admitted as a barrister in 1947. This is when he started his practice at the Queensland bar for the next 11 years.

He was appointed a judge on the District Court of Queensland in April 1959 and as a judge of the Supreme Court of Queensland in May 1971.

In 1982, although he was only the ninth most senior justice in the court, he was the choice of the premier, Joh Bjelke-Petersen, for the post of Chief Justice. This choice was strongly opposed in cabinet by the Liberal Party, and Walter Campbell was appointed as a compromise candidate.

In 1985, Campbell left the Supreme Court to take up an appointment as state governor and Andrews was appointed Chief Justice.

He retired in 1989 when he reached the statutory retirement age of 70.

== Honours ==
Andrews was appointed a Knight Bachelor in 1987 and received the Centenary Medal in 2001.

== See also ==
- Judiciary of Australia
- List of Judges of the Supreme Court of Queensland

Legal offices
Preceded by Walter Campbell	Chief Justice of Queensland; 1982–1985	Succeeded by John Macrossan
