= Neal Macrossan =

Australian lawyer and judge

The Honourable Neal Macrossan
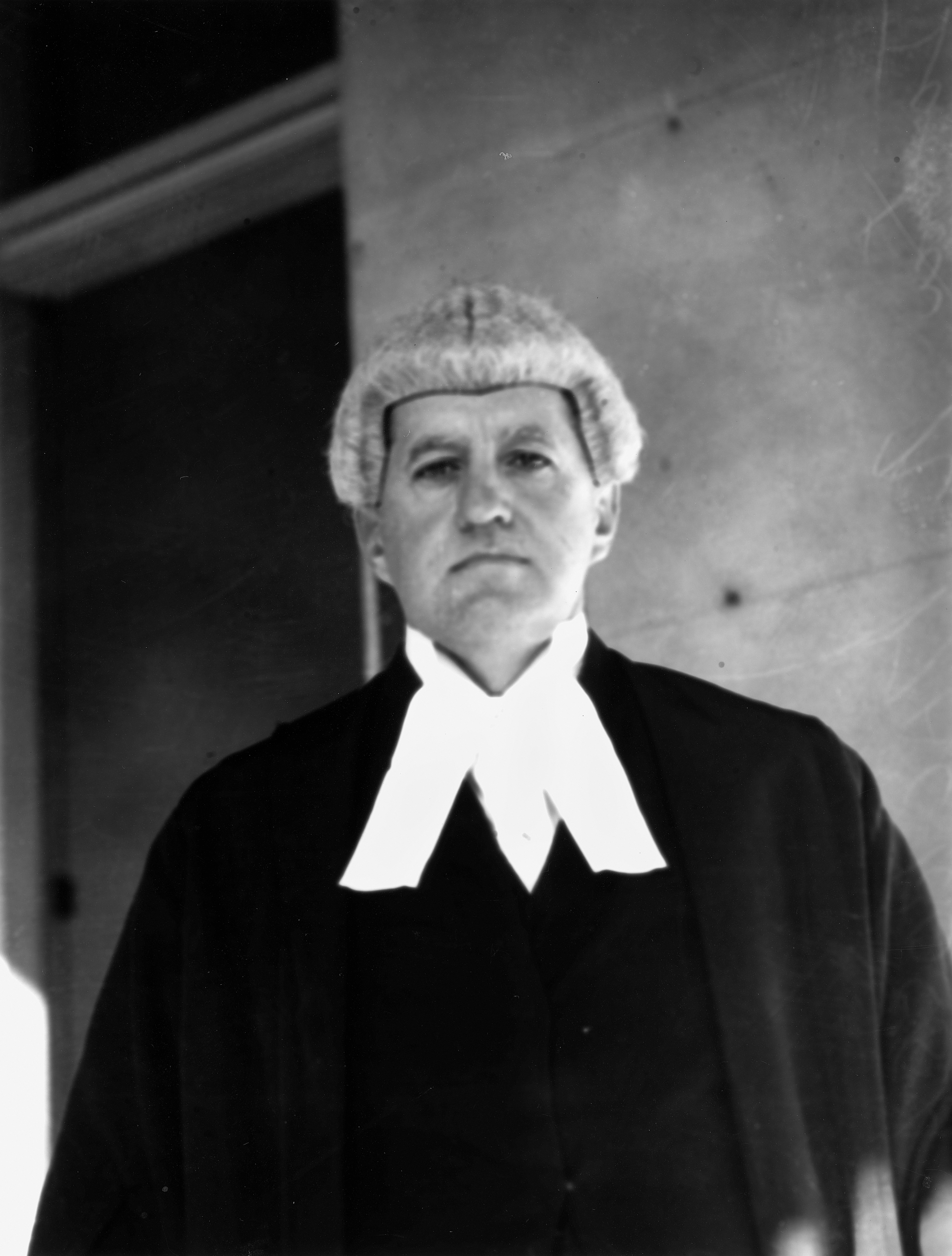
- Justice Neal Macrossan; Senior Puisne Judge; Chairman of the Medical Assessment Tribunal Brisbane 1940

9th Chief Justice of Queensland
- In office 23 April 1946 – 30 December 1955
- Preceded by: William Webb
- Succeeded by: Alan Mansfield

Personal details
- Born: Neal Macrossan; 27 April 1889 Lutwyche, Queensland, Australia
- Died: 30 December 1955 (aged 66)
- Resting place: Nudgee Cemetery
- Relations: John Macrossan (father), Hugh Denis Macrossan (brother), John Macrossan (nephew)
- Occupation: Barrister, Judge, Chief Justice

Neal William Macrossan (1889–1955) was a lawyer, judge and Chief Justice of the Supreme Court of Queensland.

== Early years ==
Macrossan was born on 27 April 1889 at Lutwyche in Queensland. He was the eighth and youngest child of Australian politician John Murtagh Macrossan and Bridget Macrossan (née Queely). He was educated at the Normal School in Brisbane. There he won a scholarship and attended at St. Joseph's Nudgee College. In 1904 whilst studying at St Joseph's, he was awarded the T J Byrnes medal for obtaining the highest pass mark in Queensland. In 1906 he again topped the State at the senior level. He also won a silver medal for Greek and was selected as the Rhodes scholar for Queensland in 1907.

Macrossan studied at Magdalen College, Oxford. He obtained a Bachelor of Arts with honours in 1910 and obtained a Master of Arts in 1914 from Oxford. The University of Queensland awarded him a Bachelor of Arts Ad Eundem Gradum on 1 June 1911 to mark the occasion of the founding of the University of Queensland, although the Queensland Supreme Court Library notes it as a Masters of Arts.

On his return to Queensland, he obtained employment in the Queensland Crown Solicitor's Office. He passed the Barristers’ Board admission examination and he was called to the Bar on 27 August 1912. He unsuccessfully stood for election to the Legislative Assembly of Queensland in 1915 for the seat of Cairns, where he stood as a candidate for the Liberal Party. In Brisbane he married Eileen Elizabeth Beirne on 14 December 1921. He purchased Glen Alpine in 1931 in Toowoomba. Glen Alpine had the first domestic swimming pool built in the Toowoomba area. The house and gardens are now heritage classified by the Queensland Government.

Macrossan represented ex-premier William McCormack in the Mungana Mines case. McCormack was tried with ex-treasurer Ted Theodore and two others. The case was instituted following a Royal Commission on 4 July 1930 in the purchase of the mines. The royal commission had made a finding that all the accused had acted dishonestly in the purchase of the mine. The conspiracy case commenced in the Supreme Court on 22 July 1931 and resulted in a jury verdict in favour of McCormack and Theodore on 25 August.

Macrossan also appeared in the Constitutional case of Peanut Board v. Rockhampton Harbour Board heard in the High Court of Australia. The case concerned whether the Queensland Government could control peanut sales in Queensland through the Peanut Board. Macrossan appeared as junior for the Board. He was unsuccessful in arguing against the marketing law and the law was held to be unconstitutional.

Macrossan lectured at the University of Queensland on Pleading and Practice until his appointment to the bench. He also established an endowment to the University for the Macrossan lectures.

== Judicial appointment ==
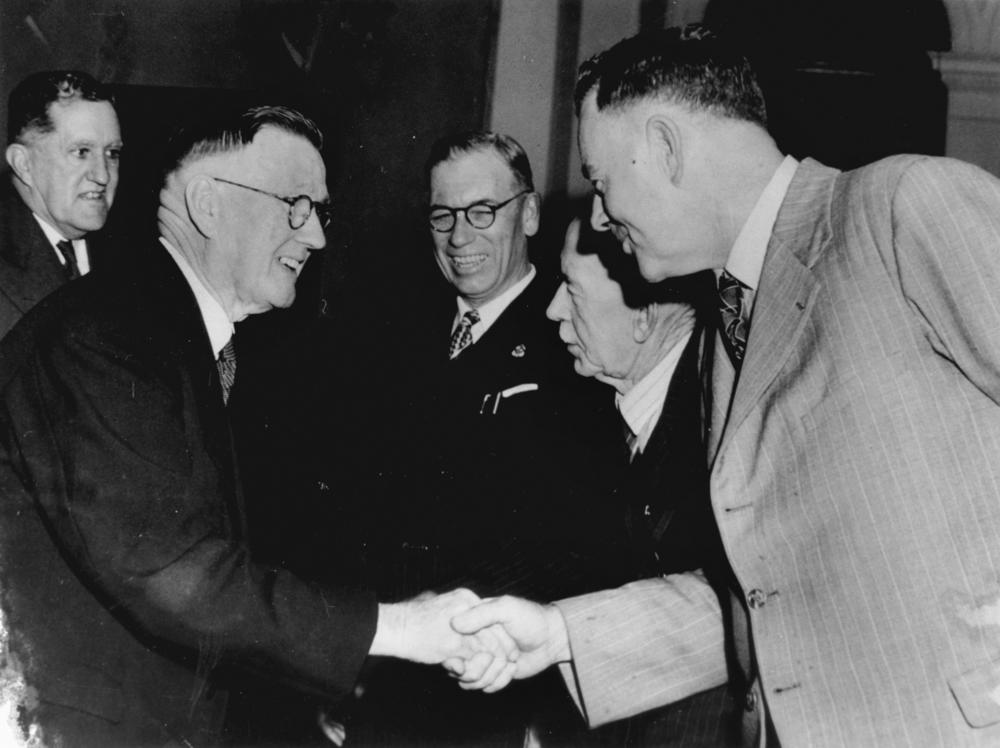
Left - right : Judge Macrossan, Frank Cooper, Ned Hanlon, David Gledson, ??, circa. 1942

Macrossan was appointed as a judge of the Supreme Court on 29 June 1940. He was appointed senior puisne judge five days later in front of more senior judges. Macrossan acted as chief justice on two occasions, before being appointed to the office on 25 April 1946. He became the second son to be appointed to that office following in the steps of his brother Hugh Denis Macrossan. As chief justice in 1947, one of the early cases heard by Macrossan at first instance was a matter concerning the dispute over the purchase of a lottery ticket. The defendants had won £6000 in a "Golden Casket" Lottery. The plaintiff claimed that the ticket was purchased in a syndicate of three, being himself and the two defendants. The case turned on the credibility of the plaintiff and the jury found in the plaintiff's favour. Macrossan awarded £2000 to the plaintiff. The publicity surrounding the case caused lottery agents to come forward and produce new evidence that showed that the plaintiff couldn't have entered into a syndicate on the date he stated, as the tickets hadn't been printed before that date. An appeal to the High Court seeking to overturn that decision was unsuccessful and Macrossan's decision stood. In 1954 his wife Eileen died. She is buried in Nudgee Cemetery.

In 1955 Macrossan heard an appeal from a decision of the Objectionable Literature Board. The board had classified books bearing titles such as Real Love, Romance Story and Darling Romance as "objectionable" material. Macrossan described the publications as emphasising "the thesis that an acceptable means of achieving this ideal [of marriage] is a casual acquaintance made by a young girl with a man hitherto a complete stranger to her the ardour of whose embraces and kisses provides the assurance of the constancy of his affection". The court found that the materials was "what they considered to be a tendency to corrupt members of an age group of females described as unstable adolescents." However, on appeal to the High Court, a majority ruling overturned the decision.

Macrossan was a warden of the council of the University of Queensland, president of the Playground (and Recreation) Association of Queensland, president of the Twelfth Night Theatre Company, and also President of the Royal Automobile Club of Queensland.

He died on 30 December 1955 in South Brisbane and following a state funeral was buried in Nudgee Cemetery.

His older brother Hugh Denis Macrossan was also a chief justice of Queensland as well as his nephew John Murtagh Macrossan (son of Macrossan's brother Vincent).

== See also ==
- Judiciary of Australia
- List of Judges of the Supreme Court of Queensland
- List of Judges of the Supreme Court of Queensland § Chief Justices

Legal offices
Preceded by William Webb	Chief Justice of Queensland; 1946-1955	Succeeded by Alan Mansfield

== Sources ==
- Connolly, P. D. (2000). "Macrossan, Neal William (1889 - 1955)". Australian Dictionary of Biography. National Centre of Biography, Australian National University. ISBN 978-0-522-84459-7. ISSN 1833-7538. OCLC 70677943.
- "The Macrossan Family". Supreme Court of Queensland Library Exhibition.
