= William Webb (judge) =

Australian lawyer and jurist (1887–1972)

The Honourable Sir William Webb KBE
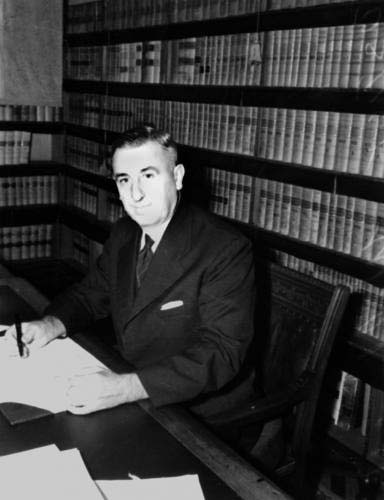
- Webb in 1940, as Chief Justice of Queensland

Justice of the High Court of Australia
- In office 16 May 1946 – 16 May 1958
- Nominated by: Ben Chifley
- Preceded by: None*
- Succeeded by: Sir Douglas Menzies

8th Chief Justice of Queensland
- In office 27 June 1940 – 15 May 1946
- Preceded by: Hugh Denis Macrossan
- Succeeded by: Neal Macrossan

Personal details
- Born: 21 January 1887 Brisbane, Queensland, Australia
- Died: 11 August 1972 (aged 85)
- Resting place: Nudgee Cemetery
- Spouse: Beatrice Agnew (m. 1917)
- Children: 6
- Education: University of Queensland (LLB)
- *The High Court bench had remained at six since the retirement of Sir Isaac Isaacs in 1931. Webb's appointment re-established a seven-member bench.

Sir William Flood Webb (21 January 1887 – 11 August 1972) was an Australian lawyer. He was the Chief Justice of Queensland and a judge of Australia's Federal Supreme Court, the High Court of Australia. He was appointed President of the International Military Tribunal for the Far East by General Douglas MacArthur, commonly known as the Tokyo trial, after the end of World War II.

== Early life and education ==
William Flood Webb was born in Brisbane, Queensland on 21 January 1887. He was educated at St Mary's School in Warwick, Queensland before graduating from the University of Queensland with a Bachelor of Laws degree. Webb was called to the bar in Queensland on 4 June 1913, after scoring a very high 71.5% on the bar examination on 20 May 1913.

== Solicitor ==
In 1915, Webb was the State Public Defender for Queensland and, from 1917 to 1922, was the Crown Solicitor. He was promoted to be Solicitor-General of Queensland in 1922, a position he held until 1925.

== Arbitration Court ==
Webb was also a Judge of the Commonwealth Court of Conciliation and Arbitration from 1922 to 1927 and, from 1925 to 1945, was President of the Queensland Court of Arbitration.

== Supreme Court ==
Webb was appointed as a puisne judge on 24 April 1925 to the Supreme Court of Queensland. He held this position until, on 17 May 1940, he became senior puisne judge of the same court. On 27 June 1940, he was promoted to Chief Justice of Queensland, an office he held until 15 May 1946, when he left to take a seat on the High Court of Australia.

In 1943, during his tenure on the court, Webb was appointed by the Government of Australia to investigate allegations of Japanese war crimes during World War II. Between 1943 and 1945, he produced three reports, known as the Webb reports, into crimes against Australian prisoners of war. He also visited London in 1944 to give advice on his reports to the United Nations War Crimes Commission.

== High Court ==
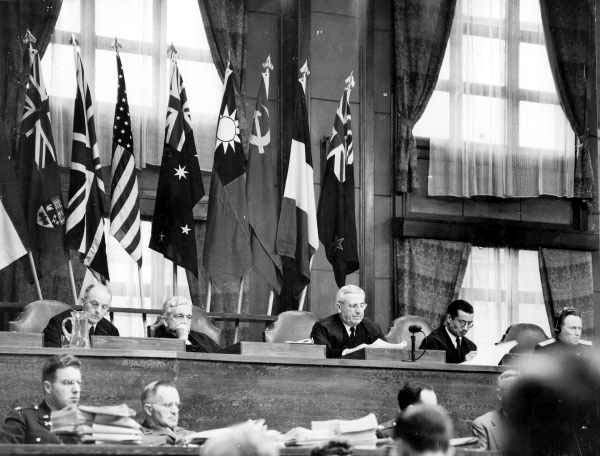
Webb presiding over the International Military Tribunal for the Far East in 1946.

Webb began his tenure on the High Court of Australia in May 1946. During his tenure, he was President of the International Military Tribunal for the Far East, the tribunal which tried Japanese war crimes from World War II, from 1946 to 1948. Webb was involved in a minor scandal late in 1947, in the lead-up to the bank nationalisation case; the Government of Australia tried to recall Webb from Tokyo by requesting General Douglas MacArthur to release him, because they believed that he would decide the case in a way that was favourable to the Commonwealth. However, after pressure from Justice Owen Dixon, Chief Justice John Latham contacted Webb and encouraged him not to leave Japan. On 12 November 1948, after more than two years of trials, Webb, as President of the Tribunal, handed down the sentences on all of the people whom the Tribunal had found guilty. Webb said that the series of trials conducted in Tokyo were the most "important criminal trials in all history." Webb retired from the High Court on 16 May 1958 after serving exactly twelve years on the bench.

== Personal life ==
On 17 March 1917, Webb married Beatrice Agnew at the Sacred Heart Church in Sandgate. They had four daughters and two sons.

He died in Brisbane on 11 August 1972, and was buried in Nudgee Cemetery.

== Honours ==
In 1942, Webb was made a Knight Bachelor for his services as Chief Justice of Queensland. In 1954, Webb was made a Knight Commander of the Order of the British Empire. In 1967, he was awarded an honorary Doctorate of Laws by the University of Queensland.

The road William Webb Drive in the district of Belconnen, Canberra is named after him.

== See also ==
- Judiciary of Australia
- List of judges of the Supreme Court of Queensland

Legal offices
Preceded by Hugh Denis Macrossan	Chief Justice of Queensland; 1940-1946	Succeeded by Neal Macrossan
