= Hugh Denis Macrossan =

Australian judge (1881–1940)

The Honourable Hugh Macrossan
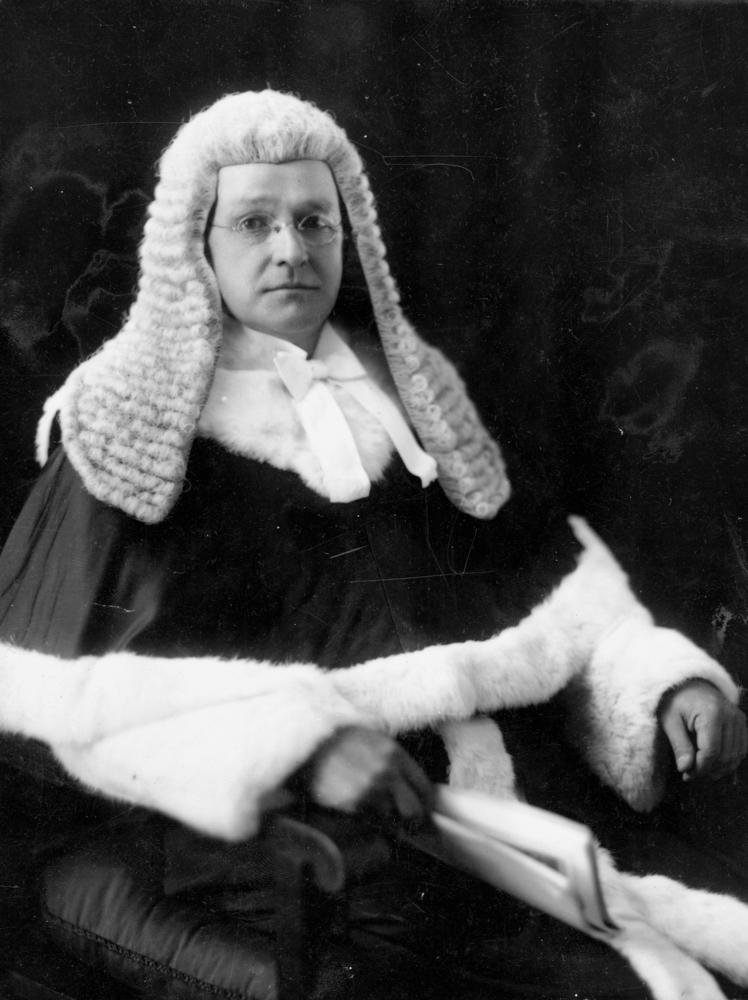

Member of the Queensland Legislative Assembly for Windsor
- In office 27 April 1912 – 22 May 1915
- Preceded by: New seat
- Succeeded by: Herbert McPhail

7th Chief Justice of Queensland
- In office 17 May 1940 – 23 June 1940
- Preceded by: James Blair
- Succeeded by: William Webb

Personal details
- Born: Hugh Denis Macrossan; 20 February 1881 Lutwyche, Queensland, Australia
- Died: 23 June 1940 (aged 59) Redcliffe, Queensland, Australia
- Resting place: Nudgee Cemetery
- Party: Ministerial
- Spouse(s): Lydia Cremin Hall (m.1912 d.1922), Gladys Mildred Trenfield (m.1926)
- Relations: John Macrossan (father), Neal Macrossan (brother), John Macrossan (nephew)
- Education: University of Sydney
- Occupation: Barrister, Judge, Chief Justice

Hugh Denis Macrossan (20 February 1881–23 June 1940) was a politician and judge in Queensland, a State of Australia. He was elected as a member of the Queensland Legislative Assembly, and was later to become a judge and also the Chief Justice of Queensland. He was the son of a prominent Queensland politician, and he was elected as a member of parliament. He served as a judge from 1926, until his appointment as chief justice in 1940 and his death later that year. He was the shortest serving chief justice in Queensland history, serving only one month, and was one of only two chief justices to have a brother and nephew served as chief justice.

== Early years ==
Macrossan was born at Lutwyche, now a suburb of Brisbane. His parents, John Murtagh Macrossan and Bridget Macrossan (née Queely), were both Irish émigrés to Australia who had married in Australia. Macrossan's father was a prominent member of the Queensland Parliament. Macrossan was educated at St. Joseph's Nudgee College in Brisbane. He later attended the University of Sydney and graduated with a Bachelor of Arts in 1902. Before embarking on his career in politics and the law, he worked as a teacher in Nudgee for three years.

== Political career ==
Macrossan obtained a taste for the law when he worked as an associate for Mr Justice Patrick Real of the Supreme Court of Queensland in 1904. He was admitted to the Queensland Bar on 22 October 1907 and practiced as a barrister thereafter. His first foray into politics occurred in 1910. He stood as a Liberal candidate for the Senate in the Australian Parliament in that year. He was not successful and he returned to practice in the law.

On 12 June 1912, he married Lydia Cremin Hall Woodhouse at St Patrick's Church in Sydney. He tried again to enter into politics. He was nominated to stand as a Ministerial candidate for the seat of Windsor in the Queensland Legislative Assembly, the lower house of the Queensland Parliament. At that time, the parliament was bicameral. This time he was elected. During his time in politics, he became disillusioned with the parliamentary party system and he urged politicians not to vote along party lines. He had little success in doing this. In the 1915 election he refused to be nominated for his former party. Instead, he ran as an Independent Liberal candidate. He lost his seat in that election to the candidate for the Australian Labor Party.

He returned to the Bar and became a leading member of it. He appeared in a number of leading Australian cases, including the constitutional case of Mooraberrie Cattle case At the swearing in of Thomas William McCawley as a judge of the Supreme Court, Macrossan was one of the few judges to argue that McCawley's commission as a judge of the Supreme Court of Queensland was valid. That issue went to the High Court of Australia and later to the Privy Council which determined that the appointment of McCawley was valid. It was during his time at the bar that his first wife Lydia died in 1922.

== Judicial career ==
Macrossan was sworn in as a judge of the Supreme Court of Queensland on 23 July 1926. He became senior puisne judge on 1 December 1926. The following day, he married Gladys Mildred Trenfield at Fortitude Valley. They separated 10 years later. In 1929, Pope Pius XI appointed Macrossan a Knight of St Gregory the Great.

Macrossan had a "tongue of silver and steel" and was noted for his hard work and speedy judgments. Unfortunately, his wit was not always appreciated. In hearing a divorce suit between two unmarried people who were living together as a married couple, Macrossan remarked "I suppose they will go and get married and spoil it all". Unfortunately for Macrossan, two ministers heard his remark and wrote a letter of complaint to the local paper protesting at the judge's comments about the institution of marriage. Macrossan took the letter as being a contempt of court by the ministers as well as the newspaper, and he duly convicted each of them. An appeal to the Full Court of the Supreme Court overturned the convictions for contempt.

Macrossan was appointed as Chief Justice of Queensland on 17 May 1940. He was unable to make any great changes as he died in office shortly thereafter. He was buried in Nudgee Cemetery.

His younger brother Neal William Macrossan became chief justice in 1946 and his nephew John Murtagh Macrossan (son of Macrossan's brother Vincent) also became chief justice in 1989.

== Sources ==
- W. Ross Johnston, Macrossan, Hugh Denis (1881 - 1940), Australian Dictionary of Biography, Volume 10, Melbourne University Press, 1986, pp 363–364.
- Serle, Percival, Macrossan, Hugh Denis (1881 - 1940), Dictionary of Australian Biography"
- "Impartiality in the Judiciary" Lee, Stephen J. 14 U. Queensland L.J. 136 (1985–1987)
- Harrison Bryan, Macrossan, John Murtagh (1833 - 1891), Australian Dictionary of Biography, Volume 5, Melbourne University Press, 1974, pp 198–199
- History page – Supreme Court of Queensland.

Legal offices
Preceded by James Blair	Chief Justice of Queensland; 1940-1940	Succeeded by William Webb
Parliament of Queensland
New seat	Member for Windsor; 1912–1915	Succeeded by Herbert McPhail
