= Mostyn Hanger =

Australian judge (1908–1980)

The Honourable Sir Mostyn Hanger KBE
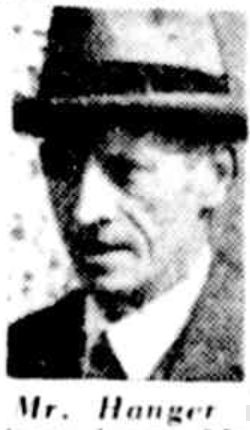
- Mostyn Hanger, on his appointment as a judge of the Supreme Court of Queensland, 1953

12th Chief Justice of Queensland
- In office 12 May 1971 – July 1977
- Preceded by: William Mack
- Succeeded by: Charles Wanstall

Administrator of Queensland
- In office 9 March 1972 – 21 March 1972
- In office 20 March 1977 – 21 April 1977

Personal details
- Born: 3 January 1908 Rockhampton, Queensland
- Died: 11 August 1980 (aged 72) St Lucia, Queensland
- Spouse: Greta Lumley Robertson

Sir (John) Mostyn Hanger KBE (3 January 1908 – 11 August 1980) was a judge in Queensland, Australia. He was Chief Justice of Queensland and Administrator of Queensland (deputy for the Governor of Queensland).

== Early years ==
Hanger was born on 3 January 1908 at Rockhampton to parents Thomas Hanger and Myfanwy Granville-Jones. He was the second of five children, including the playwright Eunice Hanger. He was educated at Gympie State High School where his father was the headmaster. Hanger became captain of the school and later dux of the school in 1925. He won a scholarship to attend and study at the University of Queensland where he obtained a Bachelor of Arts in 1929. Later, he obtained a Masters of Law in 1941 from the University of Queensland and lectured in company law at the university.

He married Greta Lumley Robertson at St Andrew's Presbyterian Church in Brisbane on 8 April 1936.

== Wartime service ==
Hanger enlisted in the Royal Australian Air Force on 25 May 1942 and became a flight lieutenant. He served in Merauke in Dutch New Guinea until 2 May 1945.

== Legal career ==
After leaving University, he obtained a position as a clerk in the Supreme Court of Queensland. He was called to the Queensland bar on 21 November 1930, although he did not practice as a barrister until 1932.

Hanger was appointed a King's Counsel in 1950. He was appointed a judge of the Supreme Court of Queensland on 23 July 1953. He was President of the Industrial Court of Queensland between 1962 and 1971.

He was appointed senior puisne judge in April 1970 to the Supreme Court. He became Chief Justice of Queensland on 12 May 1971.

While Chief Justice, he was Administrator of Queensland between 9 March 1972 and 21 March 1972 and also between 20 March 1977 and 21 April 1977. He was also appointed deputy governor of Queensland for a time in 1973.

He retired in July 1977 after being Chief Justice for seven years. He found that he spent less time in court hearing and deciding cases and more time on administration. He said that this "was work which was not to my liking and more and more I found that what had been a pleasure was becoming a chore".

He died on 11 August 1980 at the Brisbane suburb of St Lucia.

== Cases ==
A decision in which he ruled against re-employing forty five men by Mount Isa Mines led to an unsuccessful attempt to remove him from the court. At the time, his wife held shares in the company. The decision was reviewed by the full court of the Supreme Court. The full court held that Hanger did not need to disqualify himself from hearing the matter as his wife's shareholding was separate, and that the shareholding was minor in relation to the number of shares issued by the company.

In 1974 he heard the case of Lambert v McIntyre. This case concerned the refusal of a motorist to blow into a breathalyser machine to test whether the motorist had driven after drinking alcohol. The motorist refused to blow and the magistrate which heard the case dismissed it as the motorist refused to blow rather than failing to blow. Hanger discussed the difference on "refusing" and "failing to". He said that "the two words have not the same meaning. One may fail to do something without refusing; one may refuse to do something in words and yet do it." The motorist was found guilty of failing to blow.

In another notable case, Hanger ruled that "compulsory unionism" clauses in industrial awards could not be ordered by the State Industrial Commission.

== Family ==
Sir Mostyn Hanger was survived by his wife, daughter, and three sons. His son John Mostyn Hanger, born on 21 June 1937, followed in his footsteps and became a Judge of the District Court of Queensland, serving in that role from 1976 to 1993. In 1993, John Mostyn Hanger (Jnr) was appointed to the role of Senior Judge of the District Courts, and he served in that role until his retirement in 2001.

== Honours ==
Hanger was appointed a Knight Commander of the Order of the British Empire (KBE) in 1973.

Opera Australia award the Sir Mostyn Hanger Opera Scholarship each year in honour of Hanger, and Sir Mostyn Hanger Chambers in Southport also bear his name.

Legal offices
Preceded by William Mack	Chief Justice of Queensland; 1977–1982	Succeeded by Charles Wanstall
