= Walter Campbell (judge) =

Australian judge, administrator and governor

The Honourable Sir Walter Campbell AC, QC
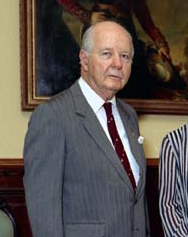
- Campbell in 1992

21st Governor of Queensland
- In office 22 July 1985 – 29 July 1992
- Monarch: Elizabeth II
- Premier: Sir Joh Bjelke-Petersen; Mike Ahern; Russell Cooper; Wayne Goss
- Preceded by: Sir James Ramsay
- Succeeded by: Leneen Forde

14th Chief Justice of Queensland
- In office 18 February 1982 – 7 July 1985
- Premier: Sir Joh Bjelke-Petersen
- Preceded by: Charles Wanstall
- Succeeded by: Dormer Andrews

Personal details
- Born: 4 March 1921 Burringbar, New South Wales
- Died: 4 September 2004 (aged 83) Ascot, Queensland
- Spouse: Georgina Pearce (m. 1942)
- Children: 3
- Education: University of Queensland

Military service
- Allegiance: Australia
- Branch/service: Royal Australian Air Force
- Years of service: 1941–1946
- Rank: Flight Lieutenant
- Battles/wars: Second World War

Sir Walter "Wally" Benjamin Campbell, AC, QC (4 March 1921 – 4 September 2004) was an Australian judge, administrator and governor. He was the Chief Justice of the Supreme Court of Queensland, Chancellor of the University of Queensland and the 21st Governor of Queensland from 1985 to 1992.

== Background and early life ==
Campbell was born in Burringbar, northern New South Wales, to Archie Eric Gordon Campbell and Leila Mary, née Murphy. Archie Campbell was a decorated soldier of the First World War, having won the Military Cross for gallantry in action against the Ottoman Turks in Gaza and the Distinguished Service Order for later efforts in Damascus. Leila Campbell died unexpectedly, leaving Campbell and his brothers to spend a considerable amount of time with their mother's parents in northern New South Wales.

The death of his mother interrupted Campbell's early education at a Christian Brothers' convent in Toowoomba and led to his continuing his studies at a college in Lismore, New South Wales. Campbell completed his education at Downlands College, Toowoomba, becoming the college's first Open Scholar in the late 1930s, having already been named dux of the college twice and earning the highest grade in Queensland for Senior Latin.

== University and military service ==
Campbell attended the University of Queensland from 1940, and served as editor of the student paper Semper Floreat during his first year. He interrupted his studies in 1941 to take up service in the Royal Australian Air Force (RAAF), during the Second World War. He passed his pilot's examination at RAAF Base Amberley on 7 December 1941 and was assigned to the 67th Reserve Squadron of the RAAF, which patrolled Australia's eastern coast. Campbell became a flight instructor and was based in Tasmania, badly injuring his knee in a biplane crash. After his recovery, the RAAF put Campbell in command of a Liberator Base in the Darling Downs.

Campbell was discharged from the RAAF with the rank of flight lieutenant on 13 February 1946, and returned to his studies. He became President of the University of Queensland Union, and graduated in 1948 with first class honours in Law, having already gained a Master of Arts the previous year.

== Legal career ==
Campbell was admitted to the Bar in 1948 and became a Queen's Counsel in 1960. His practice took him as high in the legal world as the Privy Council in London, before which he appeared on several occasions. He became a member of the Law Faculty Board at the University of Queensland in 1954. Campbell himself recalled that when he entered the legal profession "there were only about seventy barristers in private practice in Queensland", contrasting this number with the increase that had taken place by the time he was Governor of Queensland. In 1965, Campbell became President of the Queensland Association, holding this position simultaneously with the presidency of the national equivalent from 1966 to 1967. Campbell represented Joh Bjelke-Petersen in a failed High Court appeal against the Australian Taxation Office in 1959.

== Judiciary ==
In 1967, Campbell gained a position on the bench of the Supreme Court of Queensland. In the late 1960s and early 1970s he would meet with other Justices in Canberra when they had been summoned to various board and committee meetings and discuss various issues facing the judiciary ranging from problems with sentencing to the difficulty of persuading eminent lawyers to enter the judiciary. The issue of lawyers being unwilling to move from the Bar to the Bench remained a concern to Campbell even after he had left the judiciary and become governor.

In 1982, the incumbent Chief and Puisne Justices of Queensland were scheduled to retire, having reached the mandatory age of 70. Campbell became the centre of a controversy, as he was chosen to fill the Chief Justiceship instead of Jim Douglas, the favoured candidate of the Liberal Party. Joh Bjelke-Petersen admitted to choosing Campbell as a "compromise candidate" to Justice Douglas and his own preferred Chief Justice, Dormer Andrews. The retiring Chief Justice declared that he had nothing against Campbell personally, but that he found the treatment of Douglas "unjust and unsatisfactory". Campbell emerged largely unscathed from the controversy, but did clash at times with the Bjelke-Petersen government as Chief Justice, criticising the legal integrity of certain legislation when he found it necessary. He was also noted as having contributed significantly to the modernisation of the Court in Queensland during his time as Chief Justice.

== Chancellor ==
Having been a member of the University of Queensland Senate since 1963, Campbell was well established within the activities of the University. In 1977 he became Chancellor of the university, holding the position for nine years until 1985. As chancellor, Campbell criticised the method of admitting people into tertiary student positions, claiming some reform was needed. There was also controversy in this period when the government forced the university publishers to withdraw the second volume of Ross Fitzgerald's History of Queensland, and the university awarded an honorary doctorate of law to Premier Joh Bjelke-Petersen.

== Governor ==
Campbell succeeded Sir James Ramsay as Governor of Queensland on 22 July 1985. There has been some conjecture that the Bjelke-Petersen government may have elevated Campbell to this position to remove him from the Chief Justiceship. All of the controversies surrounding Campbell appear to be merely projections of the very controversies affecting Joh Bjelke-Petersen and his government, with Campbell's inauguration as governor attracting complaint from the Queensland Trades and Labour Council that they had been ostracised from the swearing-in ceremony due to political manoeuvring by the State Government.

This tradition of controversy involving Campbell and the government came to crisis in 1987 when there was internal strife within the National Party between Bjelke-Petersen and his cabinet, which almost caused a constitutional crisis in Queensland governance. There had already been murmurs in early 1987 of a vice-regal intervention in Queensland politics when The Australian newspaper in March featured a front-page article detailing State Opposition leader Nev Warburton's call for Campbell to sack Bjelke-Petersen over allegations of illegal conduct by the government. These suggestions came to nothing. However, later in the year when Bjelke-Petersen lost the confidence of his cabinet, the question was again raised as to what role Campbell as governor would play in the event of a constitutional crisis.

On 23 November 1987, Bjelke-Petersen visited Campbell at Government House, Brisbane to discuss a restructuring of his ministry. It was Bjelke-Petersen's wish to dissolve his entire ministry and be recommissioned as premier with a new distribution of ministerial portfolios, however Campbell's advice was for the premier to seek the individual resignations of those ministers he wanted removed from the ministry. After having approached five ministers about resigning from their offices and being refused by each one, the premier returned to Campbell on 24 November and requested the termination of the commissions of three of the five ministers. He also advised Campbell to dissolve the legislature and call a fresh election. Campbell balked at calling a new election for a legislature barely a year old, but did agree to the removal of the three ministers.

Although the government's problems were already serious, the difficulty for Campbell really began on 26 November. That day, a spill motion carried in the National party room. Bjelke-Petersen had not anticipated this party-room coup and did not even attend the meeting. He thus did not nominate for the ensuing leadership ballot, which was won by one of the dismissed ministers, Mike Ahern. In accordance with normal convention, Ahern wrote to Campbell seeking to be commissioned as premier in place of Bjelke-Petersen. This should have been a pro forma request, because the Nationals had a majority in their own right. However, Bjelke-Petersen touched off a constitutional crisis when he refused to resign his commission. Campbell refused to use his reserve power to terminate it after receiving legal advice that he should only dismiss Bjelke-Petersen and commission Ahern if Bjelke-Petersen lost a vote of no confidence. There were also fears that Bjelke-Petersen might advise Campbell to dissolve parliament and call elections. Some sections of the press attacked Campbell for his apparent inactivity during the crisis, while other voices within the legal and political world supported his course of action. As the Sydney Morning Herald had described this tense situation, Queensland now had a "Premier who is not leader" and the National Party a "Leader who is not Premier". The crisis ended only when Bjelke-Petersen retired from politics on 1 December. Campbell was later praised by many in the media for his handling of the situation.

In March 1988, Campbell gave a lecture on "The Role of a State Governor" to the Royal Australian Institute of Public Administration, Queensland Division, in which he described the various functions carried out by state governors, the legal and constitutional framework of the office and numerous historical accounts of different situations involving vice-regal figures in Queensland and other Commonwealth domains.

== Retirement ==
After seven years as governor, Campbell retired in July 1992. He did not retire quietly, continuing to speak at various functions and publicly opposing Paul Keating's push for an Australian republic in 1993 by writing to the British newspaper The Daily Telegraph. He continued his advocacy for the monarchy later that year when launching the second volume of "Upholding the Australian Constitution", stating, "republicanism I think is being used by certain people as a pretext or as a blind or a screen to conceal a deeper purpose or purposes".

== Personal ==
Campbell married Georgina Pearce in 1942, and fathered three children, Deborah, Peter and Wallace Campbell. He resided with his family in Clayfield, Brisbane while a member of the Supreme Court judiciary and retired to Ascot after leaving Government House. He died at age 83, at his home on 4 September 2004 after a short period of illness, and was cremated at the Mt Thompson Crematorium.

== Honours ==
Campbell was appointed a Knight Bachelor in 1979, and a Companion of the Order of Australia in 1989. In 1993, he was appointed a Fellow of the Royal Historical Society of Queensland. On 1 January 2001, he was awarded the Centenary Medal.

== See also ==
- Judiciary of Australia
- List of Judges of the Supreme Court of Queensland
- University of Queensland Union

Legal offices
Preceded by Charles Wanstall	Chief Justice of Queensland; 1982–1985	Succeeded by Dormer Andrews
Government offices
Preceded by Sir James Ramsay	Governor of Queensland; 1985–1992	Succeeded by Leneen Forde
