= Amy Vera Ackman =

Australian Sister of Charity and hospital administrator (1886–1966)

- Born: 3 July 1886
- Died: 23 August 1966 (aged 80)
- Education: Sisters of Mercy
- Occupation: Hospital Administrator

Amy Vera Ackman, known as Mother Giovanni (3 July 1886 – 23 August 1966) was an Australian hospital administrator and one of the Sisters of Charity.

== Biography ==
Ackman was born into a Jewish family in Randwick, Sydney and was educated at the Sisters of Mercy St Mary's Convent School in Malmsbury. She studied in London and became an optometrist, and established a practice in Collins Street, Melbourne in 1912. She became one of the Sisters of Charity, and made her vows in April 1917 and became "Mother Giovanni". From early 1922 she worked in the admissions office of St Vincent's Hospital in Darlinghurst, Sydney. She was appointed the Sisters hospital administrator for Bathurst from 1932 to 1937 and Lismore from 1938 to 1941, followed by a five-year term at St Vincent's Private Hospital Sydney in Darlinghurst.

Ackman was elected to the Sisters general council in 1949, and was sent to Kangaroo Point, Brisbane in March 1953, where she was involved with setting up a town office. Her fundraising led to the establishment of the £428,000 176-bed Mount Olivet Hospital, Kangaroo Point, in September 1957. In her final years she volunteered as a missionary in New Guinea, arriving in 1963 and subsequently caring for some 300 children in Bundi. After returning to a home in Darling Point, Sydney, she moved to the Mount Olivet Hospital where she died in August 1966. She is buried there in Nudgee Cemetery.
