= Governor of Queensland =

Representative of the monarch in the state of Queensland

- Coat of Arms of Queensland

- Personal standard
- Incumbent; Thomas Bradley AC KC since 1 November 2026 (19 days ago)
- Viceregal
- Style: His Excellency the Honourable
- Residence: Government House, Brisbane
- Seat: Brisbane
- Appointer: Monarch; on the advice of the premier
- Term length: At His Majesty's pleasure; (typically 5 years)
- Formation: 10 December 1859 (166 years ago)
- First holder: Sir George Bowen
- Deputy: Lieutenant-Governor of Queensland
- Salary: A$488,686 (2019)
- Website: govhouse.qld.gov.au

The governor of Queensland is the representative of the monarch of Australia, currently King Charles III, in the state of Queensland. The governor has many constitutional and ceremonial roles in the political system of Queensland; however, they are generally bound by convention to act on the advice of the premier and the Executive Council of Queensland. They also have a significant community role, such as bestowing honours and awards on behalf of the governor-general, patronage of community organisations, and representing the state as a whole. The current governor is Thomas Bradley.

Notable functions of the governor include giving royal assent to bills passed by parliament, issuing writs for elections, exercising executive power on the advice of the Queensland Executive Council, formally appointing government officials (including the premier, ministers and judges), opening sessions of state parliament, and presenting Australian honours. Although Australia has a federal system of government, the governor is the direct representative of the monarch and is not subordinate to the governor-general.

In almost all instances, the governor only exercises de jure power in accordance with the principles of the Westminster system and responsible government. This requires them to remain politically neutral and to only act in accordance with parliament (such as when selecting the premier and providing royal assent) or on the advice of ministers (when performing executive actions). In certain limited circumstances, the governor can exercise reserve powers (powers that may be exercised without or against formal advice). Governors are rarely called upon to exercise these reserve powers in the modern period.

In their ceremonial and community roles, the governor represents the state and its citizens. Domestically, this role entails attending services and commemorations, sponsoring community organisations and hosting events at their official residence, Government House, located in the Brisbane suburb of Paddington. The governor also promotes Queensland's economic, social and cultural interests abroad and is entitled to travel on an Australian diplomatic passport for official business. The governor is supported by an official secretary and the Office of the Governor, an independent entity within the Queensland Government which employed 51 full-time equivalent staff in 2025.

The governor is selected by the premier and formally appointed by the monarch on the premier's advice. Their term of office is not fixed, but they typically serve for five years. Unlike the other Australian colonies, Queensland received responsible government immediately upon being proclaimed as a colony in 1859. Eight British-born officials (a mixture of minor British nobility and landed gentry) served as governor during the colonial era, starting with Sir George Bowen. After Federation in 1901, the position was held by a series of minor British nobles, until the first Australian governor, Sir John Lavarack, was appointed in 1948. Sir John was succeeded by the British Sir Henry Smith as governor; however, all governors since have been Australian citizens. Leneen Forde, the first woman to serve as governor of Queensland, (Note: serving 1992-1997) was born in Canada; however, all other governors since 1966 have been Australian-born.

== Appointment ==
The governor is formally appointed by the monarch with a commission as required by section 29 of the Queensland Constitution. When a new governor is to be appointed, the current premier recommends a name to the monarch, who by convention accepts that recommendation. Prior to 1986, the governor was appointed by the monarch of the United Kingdom acting on the advice of the Colonial Secretary (after 1966, the Foreign Secretary), although local recommendations were considered and usually accepted by the British minister.

The incoming governor is publicly announced usually several months before the end of the existing governor's term. After receiving their commission, the new governor takes an oath or affirmation of allegiance to the monarch and an oath or affirmation of office. These oaths are administered by the chief justice of Queensland or another justice of the Supreme Court.

=== Tenure ===
The Queensland Constitution does not set a term of office, so a governor may continue to hold office for any agreed length of time. The typical term of office is five years, although after this initial term, a commission may be extended. The longest-serving governor was Sir Leslie Wilson, who was in office for 13 years and 315 days between 1932 and 1946. At the time of his retirement, Sir Leslie was the longest-serving British governor or governor-general since Jonathan Duncan served 16 years as Governor of Bombay; from 1795 until his death in 1811.

In the absence of the governor, the government of Queensland is administered by the lieutenant-governor of Queensland, or in their absence, the most senior available justice of the Supreme Court of Queensland.

The lieutenant-governor is required to assume the administration of the government as acting governor of the state when:

- there is a vacancy in the office of Governor,
- the governor has assumed the administration of the government of the Commonwealth,
- the governor is absent from the state, or
- the governor is otherwise incapable of performing their role.

The chief justice, or next senior available justice, of the Supreme Court is required to assume the administration of the government as acting governor if the lieutenant-governor is unable to.

The governor may also appoint the lieutenant governor or a supreme court justice as their deputy to perform some or all of the functions of the governor on behalf of the governor while the governor is exercising the office.

=== Dismissal ===
A governor may be dismissed by the monarch before their term is complete. Since the passage of the Australia Act 1986 the monarch may only dismiss a governor on advice from the premier, who is responsible for selecting an immediate replacement or letting the vacancy provisions take effect. Prior to 1986, the governors were dismissed, or recalled to the United Kingdom, by the monarch of the United Kingdom.

== Constitutional role ==
The governor has a key role in performing constitutional duties in all branches of government of the state. The governor also has a subsidiary role performing some constitutional duties relating to the government of the Commonwealth.

=== Role in the Queensland Parliament ===
The Queensland Constitution defines the Parliament of Queensland as consisting of the monarch and the Legislative Assembly. However, the monarch's role is no more than titular, with the governor responsible under the Queensland Constitution and Australia Act 1986 for all of the functions undertaken by the monarch in regard to the UK parliament. These include the power to summon, dissolve and prorogue the Parliament, to issue writs for elections, as well as the power to give royal assent to bills in the monarch's name.

The governor also has a ceremonial role in swearing in and accepting the resignations of members of Parliament. All members must make an oath or affirmation of allegiance to the King in the presence of the governor or someone appointed by them before they take their seats. On the day parliament opens, the governor makes a speech in the former Legislative Council chamber (similar to the King's Speech in the UK), entirely written by the government, explaining the government's proposed legislative program.

One of the most significant powers of the governor is the power to grant royal assent in the King's name. This assent gives bills that have been passed by the Legislative Assembly the force of law. Prior to the Australia Act 1986, the Australian Constitutions Act 1850 (13 & 14 Vict. c. 59 (Imp)) authorised the governor to reserve a bill for the monarch's pleasure, that is allow the monarch to give royal assent personally to a proposed bill. When the governor acted as a representative of the British government, this provision allowed for the governor to refer a bill back to the British government for review, which would then advise the monarch whether or not to grant assent. Since the passage of the Australia Act 1986, the powers of the monarch in relation to the state - save for the power to appoint the governor - are exercised by the governor. Under the Australian Constitutions Act 1842 (5 & 6 Vict. c. 76 (Imp)), the British government could also advise the monarch to disallow a law passed within the last two years, which would annul the law on the governor's proclamation or message to the parliament. This power was also removed by the Australia Act 1986.

Following the 1975 Australian constitutional crisis, then-premier Sir Joh Bjelke-Petersen amended the Queensland Constitution to provide that the governor is not subject to direction by any person and is not limited as to the Governor's sources of advice" on the appointment or dismissal of ministers. Bjelke-Petersen feared that a future Commonwealth government would either assert or acquire by consent the exiting powers of the imperial parliament over the states, giving them the power to either abolish the office or make it subordinate to the governor-general, with the aim of refusing royal assent to state bills. This amendment provision was doubly entrenched, requiring a referendum for the provisions about the governor to be amended or removed. Following the passage of the Australia Act 1986, the power of the British Parliament to legislate for the states has been removed. However, there remains academic doubts of the legal effectiveness of the double entrenchment provisions.

This provision worked against Bjelke-Petersen when, in the dying days of his government in November 1987, he tried and failed to convince governor Sir Walter Campbell to remove several ministers to shore up his own support within Parliament. When the parliamentary wing of the National Party deposed Bjelke-Petersen and elected one of the dissident ministers, Mike Ahern, as the new leader of the National Party, and Bjelke-Petersen initially refused to resign as premier and Sir Walter resisted calls to dismiss him.

=== Role in executive government ===
Executive powers vested in governor by statute or as part of the prerogative are exercised on the advice of ministers in accordance with the principles of responsible government. This occurs formally through the Executive Council, a body of all current (and technically former) ministers that advises the governor. Such advice is generally the result of decisions already made in Cabinet, the de facto highest executive body in Victoria.

Formally, the governor exercises the traditional rights of the monarch as identified by Bagehot: the right to be consulted, to encourage and to warn.

=== Role in the government of the Commonwealth ===
The role of state governors in the government of the Commonwealth is limited to the issue and return of the writs for the election of senators representing their state, and the nomination of new senators to fill a casual vacancy.

When the prime minister advises governor-general to call an election of the House of Representatives within the 12 months before the expiration of the term of half the Senate, or the dissolution of both houses of parliament under section 57 of the Australian Constitution, they will also advise the governor-general to invite the state governors to issue the writs for the election of senators on the same date.

While the office of governor of Queensland has little role in the administration of the government of the Commonwealth, the individuals who serve as governors of Queensland are - like all the Governors of the Australian states - normally given a dormant commission to administer the government of the Commonwealth in the absence from Australia, or the death, incapacity or removal from office of the governor-general by the Sovereign. In October 1975, then-governor Sir Colin Hannah had his dormant commission to administer the government of the Commonwealth withdrawn after publicly criticising the "fumbling ineptitude" of prime minister Gough Whitlam. After the dismissal of the Whitlam government, new prime minister Malcolm Fraser unsuccessfully sought to have Hannah's commission restored.

Some Queensland governors are also appointed as a Deputy of the Governor-General to perform certain responsibilities of the Governor-General while the Governor-General is present in Australia, but unable to perform them personally.

== Ceremonial role ==
Governors' rank insignia

In addition to the formal constitutional role, the governor has a representative and ceremonial role, though the extent and nature of that role has depended on the expectations of the time, the individual in office at the time, the wishes of the incumbent government, and the individual's reputation in the wider community. Governors generally become patrons of various charitable institutions, present honours and awards, host functions for various groups of people including representatives of other countries, and travel widely throughout the state.

The governor is generally invited to become patron of various charitable and service organisations. Historically the governor has usually served as Chief Scout of Queensland, Deputy Prior of the Order of St John, and by law is the Official Visitor of University of Queensland.

The governor fills the role of Honorary Colonel for the Australian Army Reserve's Royal Queensland Regiment. and is Honorary Air Commodore of No 23 (City of Brisbane) Squadron, Royal Australian Air Force. These appointments are strictly honorary, and unlike governors in the United States who exercise operational control their state National Guard, the governor of Queensland plays no formal role in the command structure of these units.

== Privileges ==
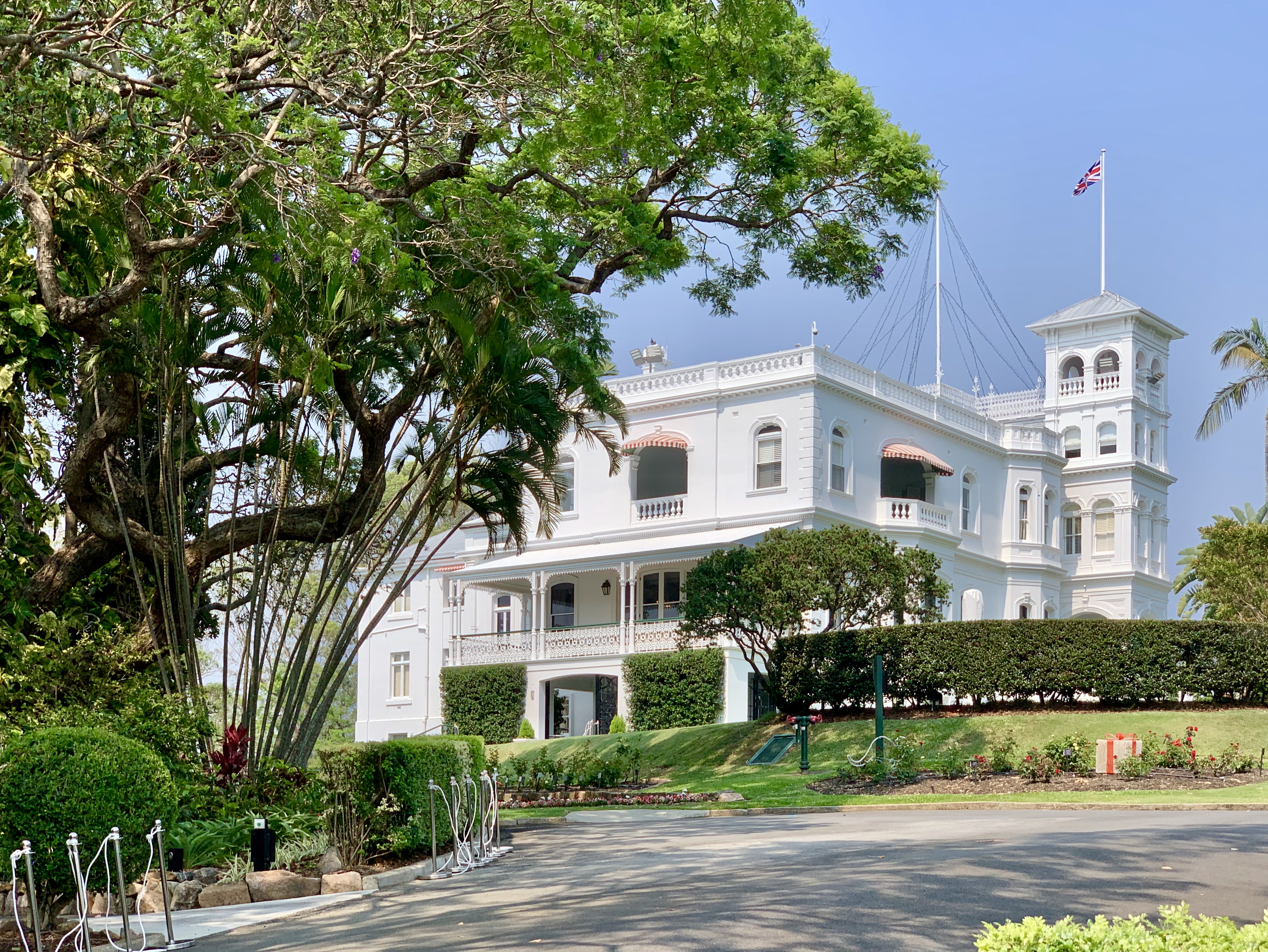
Government House, Brisbane

Governors are entitled to various privileges by virtue of holding the office. These include the right to live in Government House, a heritage-listed mansion set in 14 hectares (35 acres) of gardens and bushland in the inner-Brisbane suburb of Paddington. The building, also known as Fernberg, was built in 1865.

When Sir George Bowen was appointed the first Governor of Queensland in 1859, he temporarily resided in Adelaide House - which was rented by the colonial government for £350 per year. Sir George moved into Old Government House in 1862, and the property was later acquired by the Anglican Church. Following the consecration of St John's Cathedral in 1910, Adelaide House became the residence for the Dean and it is now known as The Deanery.

Between 1862 and 1910, governors resided at Old Government House, Brisbane in Gardens Point, now part of the Queensland University of Technology campus. By 1909 the once-spacious Government House was perceived as being too small for the Governor's residence, especially as it lacked a ballroom deemed essential for entertaining. Then-governor Sir William MacGregor, relocated into the leased property Fernberg as a temporary measure while a new Government House was constructed in Victoria Park. However, although the plans for the new Government House were drawn and the foundations laid, the project was abandoned. In 1911 the Government purchased Fernberg for £10,000 to be the permanent Government House of Queensland, a role that continues to the present day.

=== Official Vehicle ===
The governor's official vehicle is a 1972 Rolls-Royce Phantom VI which uses a representation of St Edward's Crown in place of a standard registration plate and flies the governor's personal standard.

=== Salary ===
The salary of the governor was initially set by the Australian Constitutions Act 1850 at £2,000, (Note: That is, pounds sterling; the Australian pound (with the same value) was introduced in 1910.) which also required any bill that altered the governor's salary to be reserved for her majesty's pleasure. As of 2025, the governor is paid the same salary as the chief justice of the supreme court (currently $488,686)

=== Official dress ===
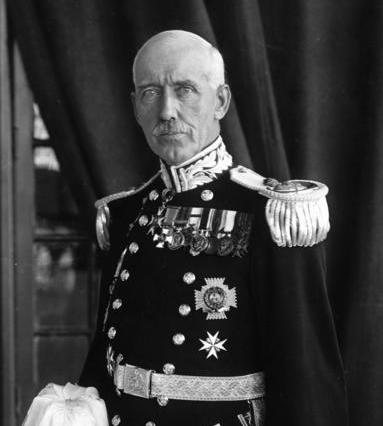
Sir John Goodwin, 14th governor of Queensland (1927-32), in his court uniform

Governors before the 1970s wore traditional court uniforms, based on the uniform of the Lord Lieutenants of English counties with the colours reversed. It consisted of a dark navy wool double-breasted coatee with silver oak leaf and fern embroidery on the collar and cuffs trimmed with silver buttons embossed with the Royal Arms and with bullion edged epaulettes on the shoulders, dark navy trousers with a wide band of silver oak-leaf braid down the outside seam, silver sword belt with ceremonial sword, bicorne cocked hat with plume of ostrich feathers, black patent leather Wellington boots with spurs, etc., that is worn on ceremonial occasions. However, that custom fell into disuse and governors now dress in informal wear day-to-day.

=== Titles and honours ===
Governors have during their tenure the style His or Her Excellency the Honourable and their spouses have the style His or Her Excellency. The style used by a former governor is the Honourable.

Since the creation of the Order of Australia in 1975, governors have been routinely invested as Companions of the Order of Australia immediately prior to being commissioned as governor, and several governors including Peter Arnison, and Dame Quentin Bryce, have been appointed Commanders of the Royal Victorian Order for their service to the sovereign as vice-regal representatives. Prior to 1986, Queensland still utilised the imperial honours system, and it was customary for governors to be recognised with awards of Knight Grand Cross or Knight Commander of the Order of St Michael and St George for their service as colonial officials as well as Knight Grand Cross or Knight Commander of the Royal Victorian Order for their services to the sovereign.

Spouses of governors have no official duties but carry out the role of a vice-regal consort. They are entitled to the courtesy style Her Excellency or His Excellency during the office-holder's term of office. Most spouses of governors have been content to be quietly supportive. Some, however, have been notable in their own right.

=== Governor's personal standard ===
Personal standard of the Governor of Queensland
- Use: Other
- Proportion: 1:2
- Adopted: 1876; 150 years ago
- Design: A Union Flag defaced with the state badge of Queensland surrounded by wreath of laurels

The governor's standard comprises a Union Jack with a white roundel in the centre with the state badge of Queensland: a light blue Maltese cross, surmounted by a royal crown and surrounded by garland of laurel leaves.

The general design of standards for British governors was approved by Queen Victoria in 1869. The design for governors of Queensland was created and flown as a personal standard since 1876, when the Maltese cross was adopted as the colonial badge. The flag's design was updated in 1963 to change the depiction of the crown from the Tudor Crown to St Edward's Crown.

If the standard is flying at Government House, on a vehicle or at an event, this indicates that the governor is present.

Previous standard of the governor

1876–1963

== Constitutional provisions ==
The office of the governor was initially established by letters patent issued by Queen Victoria on the founding of Queensland in 1867. However, up until 1977 the office was not formally recognised in Queensland legislation, with the powers of the governor set down in the letters patent and in an imperial order in council which preserved the effect of the Australian Constitutions Act 1842 (Imp) (the document that granted NSW a semi-elected assembly) as regard to the governor and restricted the power of the Queensland assembly to remove the position. However, following the 1975 Dismissal crisis then-premier Sir Joh Bjelke-Petersen amended the Constitution Act 1867 (Qld) to replicate the provisions of the order in council. This was done as the order in council only applied due to the continuing authority of the British Parliament in regard to the states. It was feared that a future Commonwealth government would either assert or acquire by consent the exiting powers of the imperial parliament over the states, giving them the power to either abolish the office or make it subordinate to the governor-general, allowing the Commonwealth to order the state governor to refuse royal assent to state bills. This amendment provision was doubly entrenched, requiring a referendum for the provisions about the governor to be amended or removed. Following the passage of the Australia Act 1986, the power of the British Parliament to legislate for the states has been removed. However, there remains academic doubts of the legal effectiveness of the double entrenchment provisions.

The Constitution Act 2001 consolidated the previous constitutional documents, including the most recent letters-patent, leaving the role of the governor fully defined by Australian law. However, the doubly entrenched provisions of the 1867 constitution remains in place as a referendum was not sought to amend them.

The chief justice of the Supreme Court of Queensland, currently Helen Bowskill, acts in the position of governor in the governor's absence. In June 2014, Queen Elizabeth II, upon the recommendation of then-Premier Campbell Newman, accorded all current, future and living former governors the title The Honourable in perpetuity.

== List of governors of Queensland ==
The first Australian born Governor of Queensland was Lieutenant-General Sir John Lavarack (appointed 1946). His successor, Sir Henry Abel Smith, the husband of the niece of Queen Mary, Lady May Abel-Smith, was British. All subsequent governors have been Australian-born, except for Leneen Forde, who was born in Canada but who emigrated to Australia at an early age.

Prior to the Separation of Queensland in 1859, it was part of New South Wales under the governors of New South Wales.

There have been 26 past governors of Queensland, prior to the current governor:

| No. | Portrait | Title Governor Office (Birth–Death) | Term of office | | Monarch |
|---|---|---|---|---|---|
| 1 | Portrait | Sir George Bowen (1821–1899) | 10 December 1859 | 4 January 1868 | Victoria (1837–1901) |
| 1 | Portrait | Sir George Bowen (1821–1899) | 8 years and 26 days | | Victoria (1837–1901) |
| 2 | Portrait | Samuel Blackall (1809–1871) | 14 August 1868 | 2 January 1871 | Victoria (1837–1901) |
| 2 | Portrait | Samuel Blackall (1809–1871) | 2 years and 142 days | | Victoria (1837–1901) |
| 3 | Portrait | George Phipps; Earl of Mulgrave (1819–1890) | 12 August 1871 | 12 November 1874 | Victoria (1837–1901) |
| 3 | Portrait | George Phipps; Earl of Mulgrave (1819–1890) | 3 years and 93 days | | Victoria (1837–1901) |
| 4 | Portrait | Sir William Cairns (1828–1888) | 23 January 1875 | 14 March 1877 | Victoria (1837–1901) |
| 4 | Portrait | Sir William Cairns (1828–1888) | 2 years and 51 days | | Victoria (1837–1901) |
| 5 | Portrait | Sir Arthur Kennedy (1809–1883) | 20 July 1877 | 2 May 1883 | Victoria (1837–1901) |
| 5 | Portrait | Sir Arthur Kennedy (1809–1883) | 5 years and 287 days | | Victoria (1837–1901) |
| 6 | Portrait | Sir Anthony Musgrave (1828–1888) | 6 November 1883 | 9 October 1888 | Victoria (1837–1901) |
| 6 | Portrait | Sir Anthony Musgrave (1828–1888) | 4 years and 339 days | | Victoria (1837–1901) |
| 7 | Portrait | Field Marshal; Sir Henry Norman (1826–1904) | 1 May 1889 | 31 December 1895 | Victoria (1837–1901) |
| 7 | Portrait | Field Marshal; Sir Henry Norman (1826–1904) | 6 years and 245 days | | Victoria (1837–1901) |
| 8 | Portrait | Charles Cochrane-Baillie; 2nd Baron Lamington (1860–1940) | 9 April 1896 | 19 December 1901 | Victoria (1837–1901) |
| 8 | Portrait | Charles Cochrane-Baillie; 2nd Baron Lamington (1860–1940) | 5 years and 255 days | | Edward VII (1901–1910) |
| 9 | Photograph | Lieutenant General; Sir Herbert Chermside (1850–1929) | 24 March 1902 | 10 October 1904 | Edward VII (1901–1910) |
| 9 | Photograph | Lieutenant General; Sir Herbert Chermside (1850–1929) | 2 years and 201 days | | Edward VII (1901–1910) |
| 10 | Photograph | Frederic Thesiger; 3rd Baron Chelmsford (1868–1933) | 30 November 1905 | 26 May 1909 | Edward VII (1901–1910) |
| 10 | Photograph | Frederic Thesiger; 3rd Baron Chelmsford (1868–1933) | 3 years and 178 days | | Edward VII (1901–1910) |
| 11 | Photograph | Sir William MacGregor (1846–1919) | 2 December 1909 | 16 July 1914 | Edward VII (1901–1910) |
| 11 | Photograph | Sir William MacGregor (1846–1919) | 4 years and 227 days | | George V (1910–1936) |
| 12 | Photograph | Major; Sir Hamilton Goold-Adams (1858–1920) | 15 March 1915 | 3 February 1920 | George V (1910–1936) |
| 12 | Photograph | Major; Sir Hamilton Goold-Adams (1858–1920) | 4 years and 326 days | | George V (1910–1936) |
| 13 | Photograph | Lieutenant Colonel; Sir Matthew Nathan (1862–1939) | 3 December 1920 | 17 September 1925 | George V (1910–1936) |
| 13 | Photograph | Lieutenant Colonel; Sir Matthew Nathan (1862–1939) | 4 years and 289 days | | George V (1910–1936) |
| 14 | Photograph | Lieutenant General; Sir John Goodwin (1871–1960) | 13 July 1927 | 7 April 1932 | George V (1910–1936) |
| 14 | Photograph | Lieutenant General; Sir John Goodwin (1871–1960) | 4 years and 270 days | | George V (1910–1936) |
| 15 | Photograph | Lieutenant Colonel; Sir Leslie Wilson (1876–1955) | 13 June 1932 | 23 April 1946 | Edward VIII (1936) |
| 15 | Photograph | Lieutenant Colonel; Sir Leslie Wilson (1876–1955) | 13 years and 315 days | | George VI (1936–1952) |
| 16 | Photograph | Lieutenant General; Sir John Lavarack (1885–1957) | 1 October 1946 | 4 December 1957 | George VI (1936–1952) |
| 16 | Photograph | Lieutenant General; Sir John Lavarack (1885–1957) | 11 years and 65 days | | Elizabeth II (1952–2022) |
| 17 | Photograph | Colonel; Sir Henry Abel Smith (1900–1993) | 18 March 1958 | 18 March 1966 | Elizabeth II (1952–2022) |
| 17 | Photograph | Colonel; Sir Henry Abel Smith (1900–1993) | 8 years and 1 day | | Elizabeth II (1952–2022) |
| 18 | Photograph | Sir Alan Mansfield (1902–1980) | 21 March 1966 | 21 March 1972 | Elizabeth II (1952–2022) |
| 18 | Photograph | Sir Alan Mansfield (1902–1980) | 6 years and 1 day | | Elizabeth II (1952–2022) |
| 19 | Photograph | Air Marshal; Sir Colin Hannah (1914–1978) | 21 March 1972 | 20 March 1977 | Elizabeth II (1952–2022) |
| 19 | Photograph | Air Marshal; Sir Colin Hannah (1914–1978) | 5 years and 0 days | | Elizabeth II (1952–2022) |
| 20 | Photograph | Commodore; Sir James Ramsay (1916–1986) | 22 April 1977 | 21 July 1985 | Elizabeth II (1952–2022) |
| 20 | Photograph | Commodore; Sir James Ramsay (1916–1986) | 8 years and 91 days | | Elizabeth II (1952–2022) |
| 21 | Photograph | Flight Lieutenant; Sir Walter Campbell (1921–2004) | 22 July 1985 | 29 July 1992 | Elizabeth II (1952–2022) |
| 21 | Photograph | Flight Lieutenant; Sir Walter Campbell (1921–2004) | 7 years and 8 days | | Elizabeth II (1952–2022) |
| 22 | Photograph | Leneen Forde (b. 1935) | 29 July 1992 | 29 July 1997 | Elizabeth II (1952–2022) |
| 22 | Photograph | Leneen Forde (b. 1935) | 5 years and 1 day | | Elizabeth II (1952–2022) |
| 23 | Photograph | Major General; Peter Arnison (b. 1940) | 29 July 1997 | 29 July 2003 | Elizabeth II (1952–2022) |
| 23 | Photograph | Major General; Peter Arnison (b. 1940) | 6 years and 1 day | | Elizabeth II (1952–2022) |
| 24 | Photograph | Quentin Bryce (b. 1942) | 29 July 2003 | 29 July 2008 | Elizabeth II (1952–2022) |
| 24 | Photograph | Quentin Bryce (b. 1942) | 5 years and 1 day | | Elizabeth II (1952–2022) |
| 25 | Photograph | Penelope Wensley (b. 1946) | 29 July 2008 | 29 July 2014 | Elizabeth II (1952–2022) |
| 25 | Photograph | Penelope Wensley (b. 1946) | 6 years and 1 day | | Elizabeth II (1952–2022) |
| 26 | Photograph | Paul de Jersey (b. 1948) | 29 July 2014 | 1 November 2021 | Elizabeth II (1952–2022) |
| 26 | Photograph | Paul de Jersey (b. 1948) | 7 years and 96 days | | |
| 27 | Photograph | Jeannette Young (b. 1963) | 1 November 2021 | 1 November 2026 | |
| 27 | Photograph | Jeannette Young (b. 1963) | 1 November 2021 | 1 November 2026 | Charles III (2022–present) |
| 27 | Photograph | Jeannette Young (b. 1963) | 5 years and 1 day | | Charles III (2022–present) |
| 28 | | Thomas Bradley | 1 November 2026 | Incumbent | Charles III (2022–present) |
| 28 | | Thomas Bradley | 20 days | | Charles III (2022–present) |

== List of administrators and lieutenant-governors of Queensland ==
Administrators and lieutenant-governors are deputy roles generally appointed to carry out the duties of the governor when the governor is unavailable, due to travel or illness. If one is not appointed, then the duties are carried out by the Chief Justice of Queensland (or the most senior judge available). The following are the administrators and lieutenant-governors of Queensland:

| Name | Term | Notes |
|---|---|---|
| Maurice Charles O'Connell | 4 January 1868 – 14 August 1868 | Administrator |
| Maurice Charles O'Connell | 2 January 1871 – 12 August 1871 | Administrator |
| Maurice Charles O'Connell | 12 November 1874 – 23 January 1875 | Administrator |
| Maurice Charles O'Connell | 14 March 1877 – 10 April 1877 | Administrator |
| Arthur Edward Kennedy | 10 April 1877 – 20 July 1877 | Administrator |
| Joshua Peter Bell | 19 March 1880 – 22 November 1880 | Administrator |
| Arthur Hunter Palmer | 2 May 1883 – 6 November 1883 | Administrator |
| Arthur Hunter Palmer | 20 April 1886 – 13 December 1886 | Administrator |
| Arthur Hunter Palmer | 9 October 1888 – 1 May 1889 | Administrator |
| Arthur Hunter Palmer | 15 November 1895 – 9 April 1896 | Lieutenant Governor Administrator |
| Samuel Griffith | 21 June 1901 – 24 March 1902 | Lieutenant Governor |
| Hugh Muir Nelson | 10 October 1904 – 30 November 1905 | Lieutenant Governor |
| Arthur Morgan | 27 May 1909 – 2 December 1909 | Lieutenant Governor |
| Arthur Morgan | 16 July 1914 – 15 March 1915 | Lieutenant Governor |
| William Lennon | 3 February 1920 – 3 December 1920 | Lieutenant Governor |
| William Lennon | 17 September 1925 – 13 June 1927 | Lieutenant Governor |
| William Lennon | 8 May 1929 – 2 June 1929 | Lieutenant Governor |
| James William Blair | 7 April 1932 – 1 June 1932 | Administrator |
| James William Blair | 17 May 1937 – 18 November 1944 | Administrator/Lieutenant Governor |
| Frank Cooper | 24 April 1946 – 30 September 1946 | Lieutenant Governor |
| Alan Mansfield | 25 January 1957 – 18 March 1958 | Administrator |
| Alan Mansfield | 31 March 1960 – 24 May 1960 | Administrator |
| Alan Mansfield | 18 April 1963 – 18 October 1963 | Administrator |
| William Mack | 10 March 1966 – 21 March 1966 | Administrator |
| William Mack | 20 March 1969 – 30 June 1969 | Administrator |
| Joseph Aloysius Sheehy | 30 June 1969 – 18 September 1969 | Administrator |
| Mostyn Hanger | 9 March 1972 – 21 March 1972 | Administrator |
| Mostyn Hanger | 21 March 1977 – 22 April 1977 | Administrator |
