= Executive Council of Queensland =

- Coat of Arms of Queensland

The Executive Council of Queensland is the body through which the premier and ministers (collectively known as the cabinet) advise the Governor of Queensland on the exercise of their constitutional and viceregal powers.

== Composition ==
The Executive Council is composed of the Premier and other ministers (including the Deputy Premier and Attorney-General). The Governor chairs meetings, but is not a member. Assistant ministers (previously called parliamentary secretaries) (Note: In establishing his ministry, Campbell Newman renamed them assistant ministers as he believed the term more easily understood. The Constitution of Queensland Act 2001 and other statutes still use the name parliamentary secretaries.) are not members. New members are appointed to the Council upon joining Cabinet, and resign or have their appointments terminated upon leaving Cabinet. This is unlike the Federal Executive Council, where former ministers remain Executive Councillors, but only current ministers are invited to its meetings. Executive Council members are entitled to the style The Honourable while in office. Former Premiers who have served at least one year and former ministers who have served at least three may apply to use the style for life.

== Procedures ==
A quorum is two Executive Councillors plus the Governor (or an Executive Councillor presiding in his place). Meetings are held on Thursdays at 11:45 a.m. in the Executive Council Room at Parliament House when the Legislative Assembly is sitting and the Cabinet Room at the Executive Building when it is not. The Clerk of the Executive Council is also present at meetings. The Clerk formally presents each item of business ("minute") to the Governor, who approves them by initialing. After all the minutes have been approved, the meeting ends, the Councillors leave, and the Governor signs any Orders, commissions, or other documents as required.

The formal term for the Governor acting on the advice of the Executive Council is the "Governor in Council". Various statutes call for the Governor in Council to carry out its provisions. For example, the Constitution of Queensland Act 2001 provides for the Governor in Council to appoint judges to the Supreme Court.

== Matters considered ==
Matters dealt with by the Governor in Council include the following:

- Appointing, among others, judges, magistrates, justices of the peace, and senior members of the civil service
- Proclamations setting commencement dates for acts of Parliament
- Orders in Council relating activities and financing of local government
- Rearranging the machinery of Government
- Statutory instruments and other subordinate legislation

== See also ==
- Government of Queensland
- Federal Executive Council (Australia)
