= Nudgee Cemetery & Crematorium =

Cemetery in Queensland, Australia

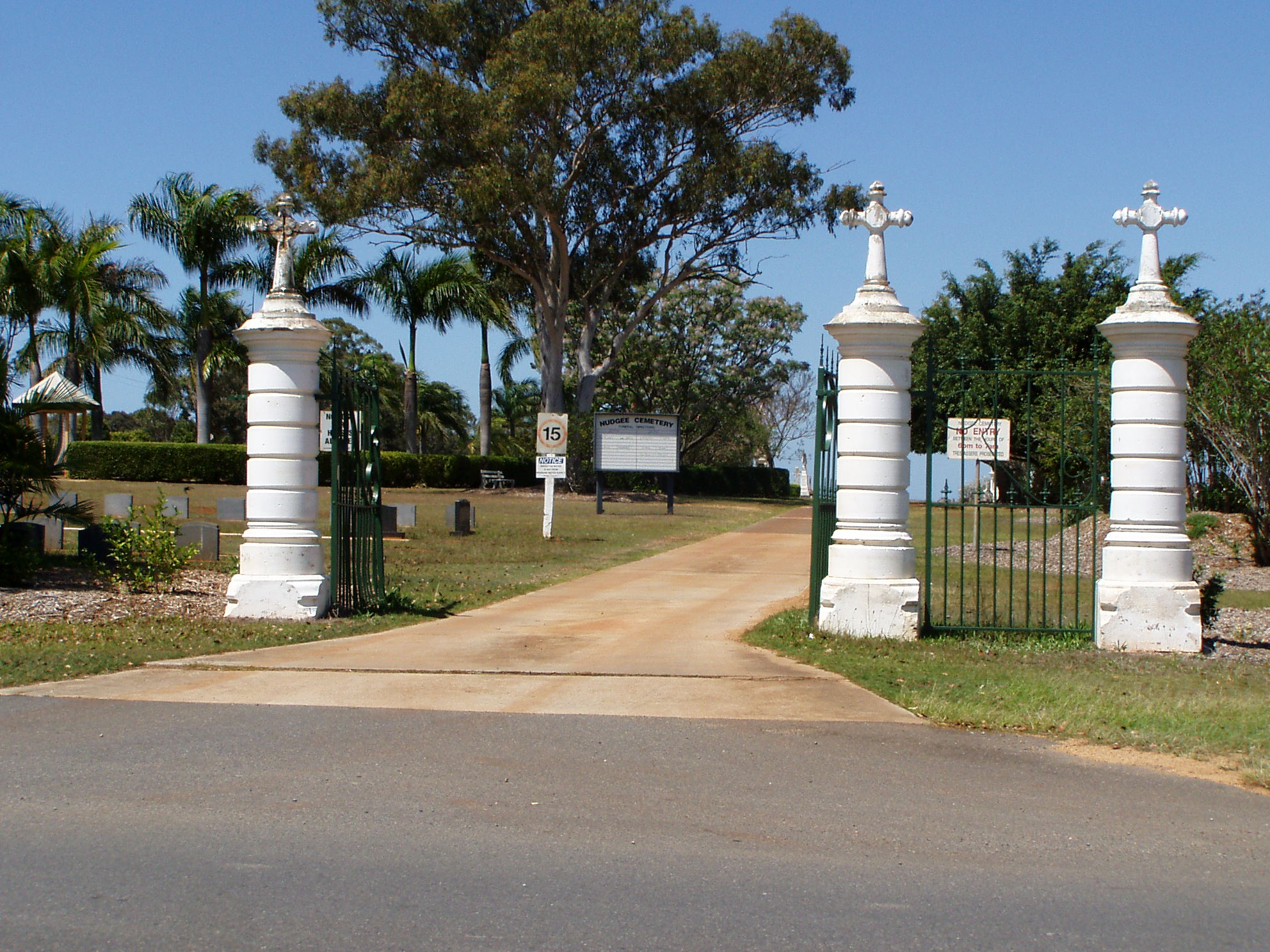
- Main entrance to Nudgee Cemetery & Crematorium
- Interactive map of Nudgee Cemetery & Crematorium

Details
- Established: 1867
- Location: Nudgee, Brisbane
- Country: Australia
- Coordinates: 27.3691°S 153.0878°E
- Type: Headstone, Lawn, Columbarium
- Owned by: Roman Catholic Archdiocese of Brisbane
- No. of graves: Over 31,000
- Website: Official website
- Find a Grave: Nudgee Cemetery & Crematorium

Nudgee Cemetery & Crematorium is a large Roman Catholic cemetery at 493 St Vincents Road, Nudgee, Brisbane, Queensland, Australia. The cemetery opened in 1867 and is still operating. Over 31,000 people are buried there.

== Services ==
The cemetery is opened and operated by the Roman Catholic Archdiocese of Brisbane and the most of those buried there were Roman Catholic. However, burial of people of other faiths is possible, although permission from the bishop was required before 1957. There are areas reserved for various Catholic religious orders as well as an area for above-ground vaults which are preferred by some ethnic groups. Since 2014, a crematorium is available with columbarium walls for the placement of ashes.

== Notable people interred ==
A list of people buried in Nudgee Cemetery & Crematorium can be found in the Category:Burials at Nudgee Cemetery and in the list below:

- Amy Vera Ackman, hospital administrator and one of the Sisters of Charity
- Vince Gair, politician and Premier of Queensland
- Ron McAuliffe, politician and one of the founders of rugby league's State of Origin series
- William Webb, judge of the Supreme Court of Queensland, High Court of Australia and President of the International Military Tribunal for the Far East after the end of World War II
- Mother Vincent Whitty, nun who established the Sisters of Mercy in Queensland
- Tom Gorman Hall of fame Rugby League Player for the Toowoomba Clydesdales

The cemetery contains five Commonwealth war graves of Australian personnel of World War II.

== See also ==
- List of cemeteries in Australia
