= Michael Rayner (architect) =

Australian architect

Michael Anthony Rayner AM
- Born: Sydney, Australia
- Education: North Sydney Boys High School; University of New South Wales
- Occupations: Architect urban designer
- Notable work: National Maritime Museum of China; Helix Pedestrian Bridge, Singapore; Kurilpa Pedestrian Bridge, Brisbane; University of Queensland Oral Health Centre; Sir Samuel Griffith Centre, Griffith University; Queensland Performing Arts Centre, Brisbane
- Spouse: Kylie Rayner
- Children: 2
- Website: www.blightrayner.com.au

Michael Anthony Rayner AM is an Australian architect and urban designer. He was a director of Cox Rayner Architects (now Cox Architecture) for 33 years before commencing a new practice, Blight Rayner Architecture, in 2016. He has led the designs of many major Australian public buildings. He is an adjunct professor at the University of Queensland and a Life Fellow and Past President of the Australian Institute of Architects in Queensland. He was appointed a Member of the Order of Australia in 2011.

== Early life and education ==
Michael Anthony Rayner was born in Sydney. He grew up in a street adjoining the houses of such noted architects as Bryce Mortlock, Peter Keys, and John Fisher. From observing their work as a child, Rayner determined early on to become an architect.

Rayner attended North Sydney Boys High School and undertook his architecture studies at the University of New South Wales, graduating with first class honours in 1980 and winning the 1980 Thesis Medal in Architecture.

He was awarded the NSW Architects Registration Board's Byera Hadley Travelling Scholarship in 1989, studying urban waterfront renewal.

== Career ==
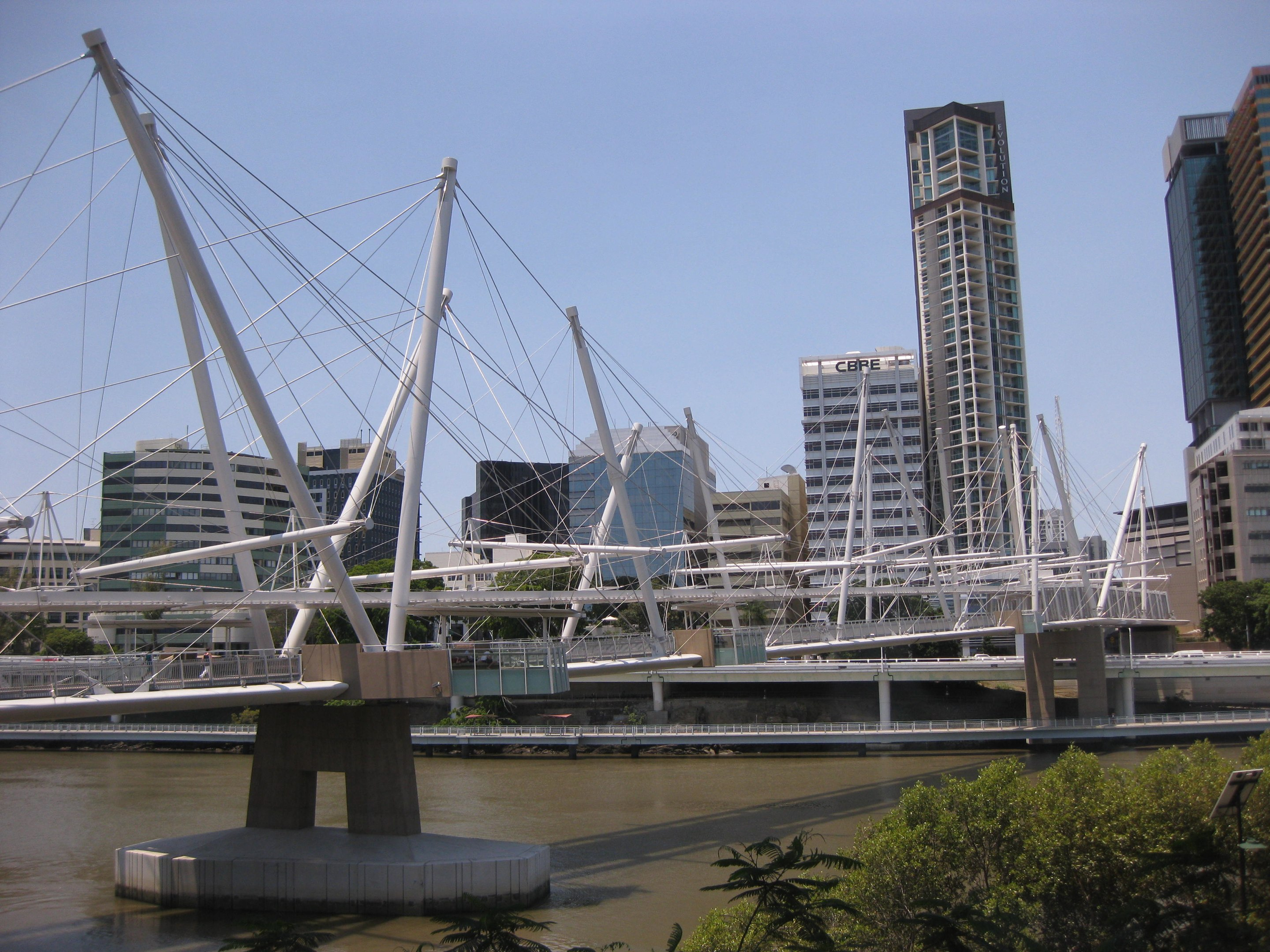
Kurilpa Bridge, Brisbane (2009)

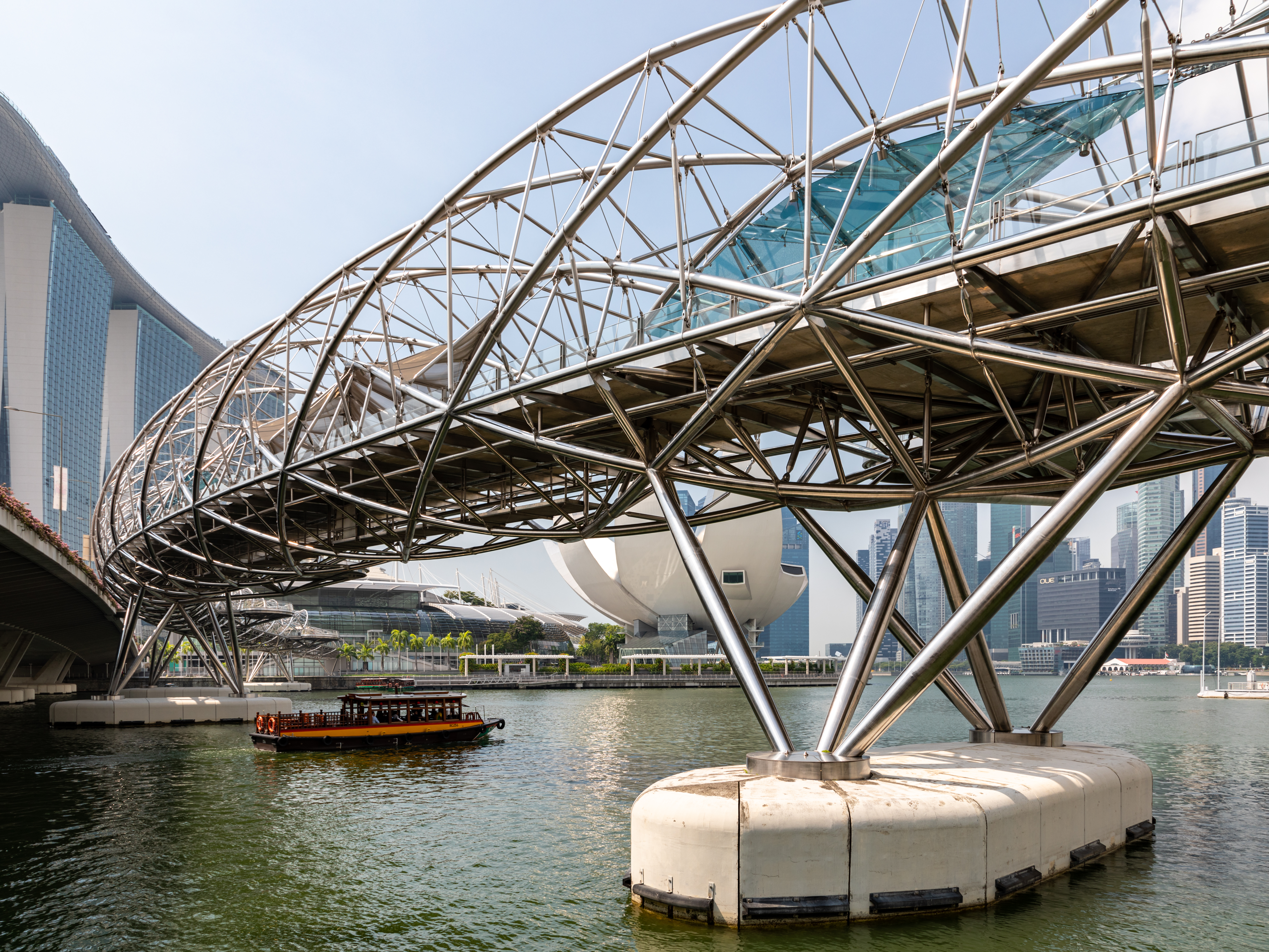
Helix Bridge, Singapore (2010)

=== Sydney ===
After graduating, Rayner joined Philip Cox and Partners, working closely with Cox for the next ten years and designing such noted public buildings as the Australian National Maritime Museum and the Sydney Exhibition Centre (now demolished) in Darling Harbour.

=== Brisbane ===
Rayner moved to Brisbane in 1990 and established Cox Rayner Architects. He designs using the overarching ethos of structure, craft, art and nature as guidelines for all projects, large or small.

Rayner left the Cox practice in 2016 to establish Blight Rayner Architecture, as a smaller firm where he could devote more time to thinking about the future of architecture and of cities, and to hands-on designing of buildings. In 2019, the firm won the international competition to design the New Performing Arts Venue at Brisbane's South Bank and subsequently the National Rugby Training Centre at Ballymore.

=== Planning and urban design ===
Although primarily an architect, Rayner worked on the Brisbane CBD Planning Strategy in 1995, and subsequently prepared the master plan for Newstead-Teneriffe (1996), Brisbane's largest urban waterfront redevelopment.

His "Smart Cities: Rethinking the City Centre" was a 2006 study proposing a series of pedestrian bridges constructed and forthcoming. In that year, he was involved in a workshop entitled Tabula Rasa which was held to reflect in the city's possible futures.

He has also produced the master plans for Griffith University's Nathan and Logan campuses, and for Singapore's Marina Bay.

== Other activities ==
Rayner is a past Queensland President of the Australian Institute of Architects (2000–2002) and was a Creative Director of the institute's National Convention in 2012.

He was a member of the Queensland Premier's Smart State Council (2006–2012) and Queensland Design Council (2009–2012).

Rayner was a juror for the World Architecture Festival Awards in Singapore in 2014 and 2015.

He was a speaker at the Affirmative Architecture Brisbane 2014 symposium.

As of 2020 is on the Queensland State Board of Advisors of the Property Industry Foundation.

== Recognition and honours ==
Rayner was appointed a Member of the Order of Australia (AM) in 2011.

As of 2021 Rayner is an adjunct professor at the University of Queensland (2009-) and he chairs Griffith University’s Architecture Industry Advisory Board. He is a long-term member of the Queensland Government's Urban Design and Places Panel.

Rayner is a Fellow of the Australian Academy of Technology and Engineering (ATSE) and a Life Fellow of the Australian Institute of Architects.

== Notable projects ==
1988	Sydney Exhibition Centre	AIA John Sulman Medal 1989
1988	Australian National Maritime Museum, Sydney	
1995	Brisbane CBD Planning Strategy	
1996	Brisbane Convention and Exhibition Centre	
1998–2001	Cairns Convention Centre	
2001	Goodwill Bridge, Brisbane	AIA National Civic Design Commendation 2002
2001	Millennium Arts Queensland Cultural Centre Master Plan, Brisbane	Brisbane RAIA Planning and Research Award (QLD)
2005	Brisbane Magistrates Court	
2006	Thuringowa Riverway, Townsville	AIA National Award for Urban Design 2007; The Waterfront Center "Excellence on the Waterfront" Project Honour Award 2007
2006	SW1 South Bank, Brisbane	PIA Australia Award for Urban Design 2011
2009	Kurilpa Bridge, Brisbane – world's largest tensegrity bridge	World's Best Transport Project 2011
2009	Ipswich Courthouse, Ipswich	AIA Queensland Regional F.D.G. Stanley Award for Public Architecture
2010	Helix Bridge, Singapore	Singapore Institute of Architects Architectural Design Award Honourable Mention; World Architecture Festival 2010 Transport Category Winner
2011	Hill End House, Brisbane	(Personal commission)
2011	Flinders Street Revitalisation, Townsville	AIA National Award for Urban Design 2013
2012	BCEC on Grey Street, Brisbane	AIA Queensland State Commendation for Art & Architecture
2013	Sir Samuel Griffith Centre, Griffith University, Brisbane	AIQS Infinite Value Project of the Year Award 2014; AIA Queensland Sustainable Architecture Award 2015; BPN Sustainability Awards Commendation 2014
2013	Griffith University Nathan Campus Master Plan, Brisbane	AIA Queensland Karl Langer Award for Urban Design 2014
2014	University of Queensland Oral Health Centre, Brisbane	INSIDE Festival Health and Education Winner 2015; AIA National Daryl Jackson Award for Educational Architecture 2016; AIA National Award for Interior Architecture 2016; AIA National Award for Sustainable Architecture 2016
2015	Brisbane City Centre Ferry Terminals	World Architecture Festival Future Projects Infrastructure Winner 2013
2020	National Maritime Museum of China, Tianjin	World Architecture Festival Competition Entries Winner 2013; World Architecture Festival Cultural Winner 2013; World Architecture Festival Future Project of the Year 2013
2021	New Performing Arts Venue, South Bank, Brisbane	(while at Blight Rayner Architects)
2021	National Rugby Training Centre, Ballymore, Brisbane	(while at Blight Rayner Architects)
2021	The Lanes Town Centre, Gold Coast	

== Personal life ==
Rayner married Kylie Broad in 1996. They have two sons, Hugh and Lachie. Hugh lives in Texas.

Rayner is an avid art collector and philanthropist. He donated 97 works from his collection to the University of Queensland Art Museum in 2015.
