= Philip Cox =

Australian architect (born 1939)

Philip Cox AO FAHA
- Born: Philip Sutton Cox; 1 October 1939 (age 87); New South Wales, Australia
- Education: University of Sydney; University of New South Wales
- Occupation: Architect
- Spouse: Louise Cox (sep. 1988)
- Partner: Janet Hawley
- Children: 2
- Awards: RAIA Gold Medal, 1984; Sir John Sulman Medal, 1963, 1965 & 1989; Blacket Prize, 1965; Wilkinson Award, 1969 & 1987; Sir Zelman Cowen Award for Public Architecture, 1985; National Award for Enduring Architecture, 2014; New South Wales Enduring Architecture Award, 2014
- Practice: Cox Architecture 1963–2015
- Buildings: Australian National Maritime Museum; Sydney Football Stadium; Rod Laver Arena; Singapore Expo; Brisbane Magistrates Court
- Projects: Sydney Olympic Park, Golden Grove Public Housing
- Website: coxarchitecture.com.au

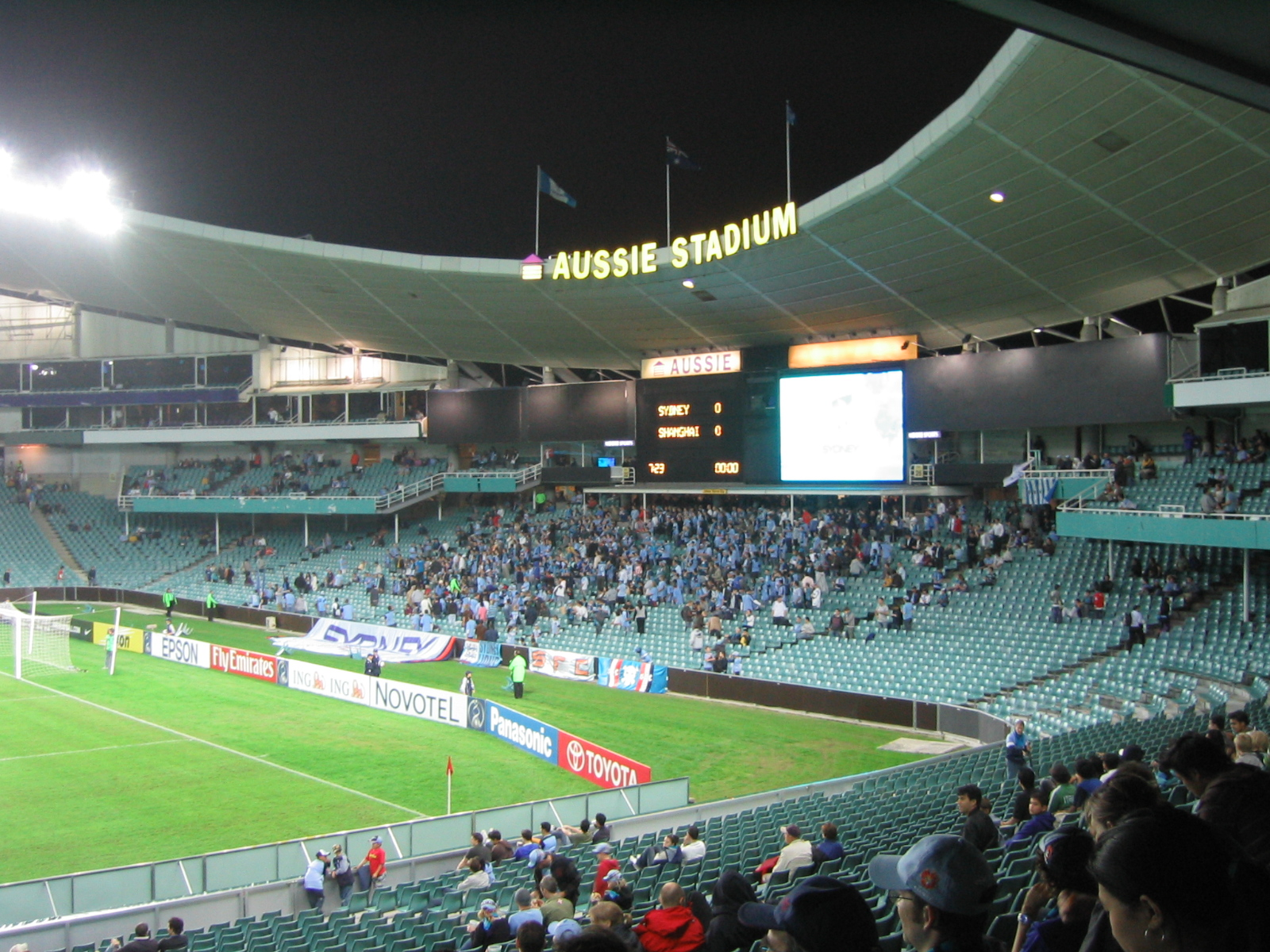
Sydney Football Stadium, Moore Park, Sydney

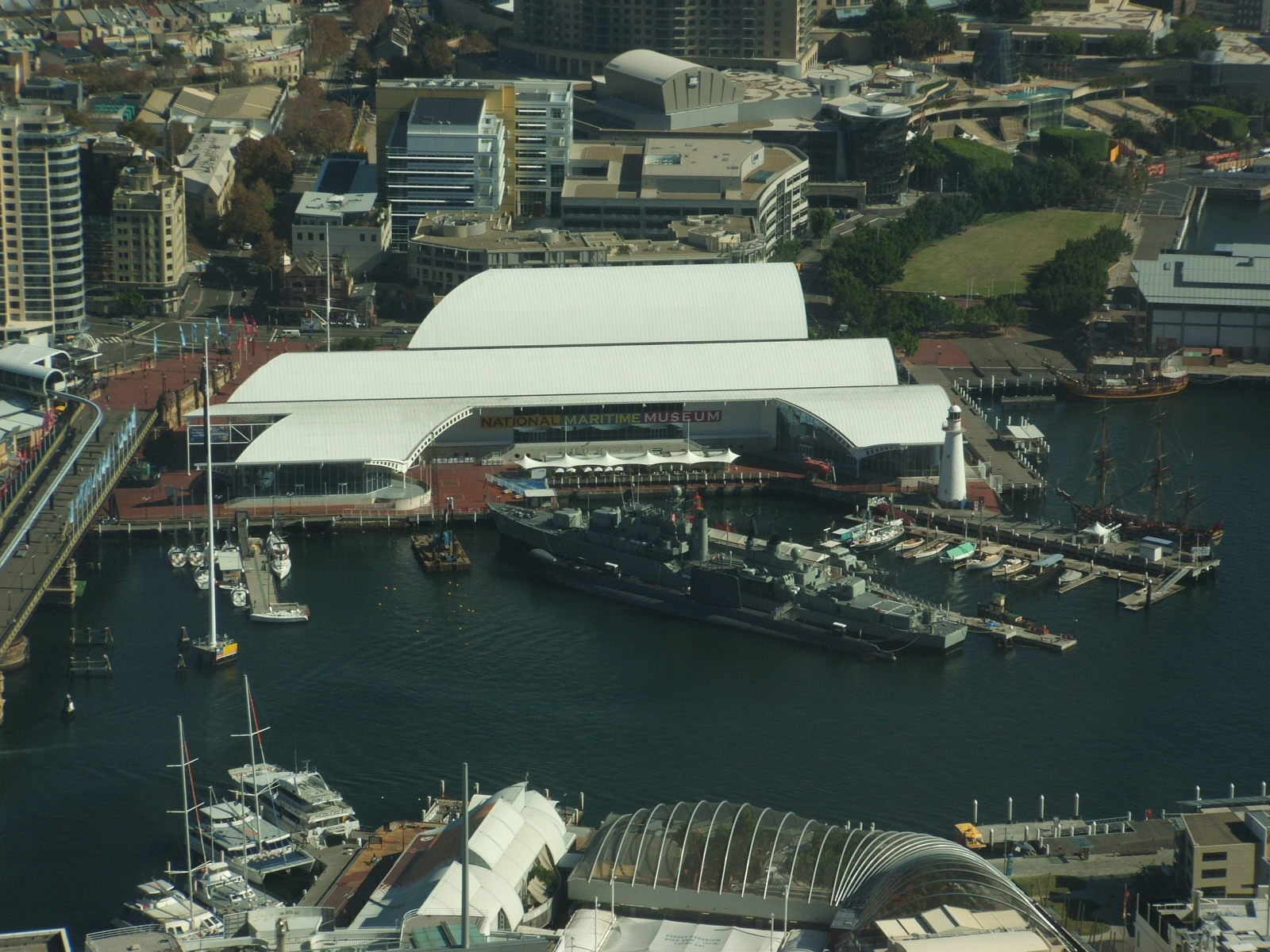
Australian National Maritime Museum, Sydney

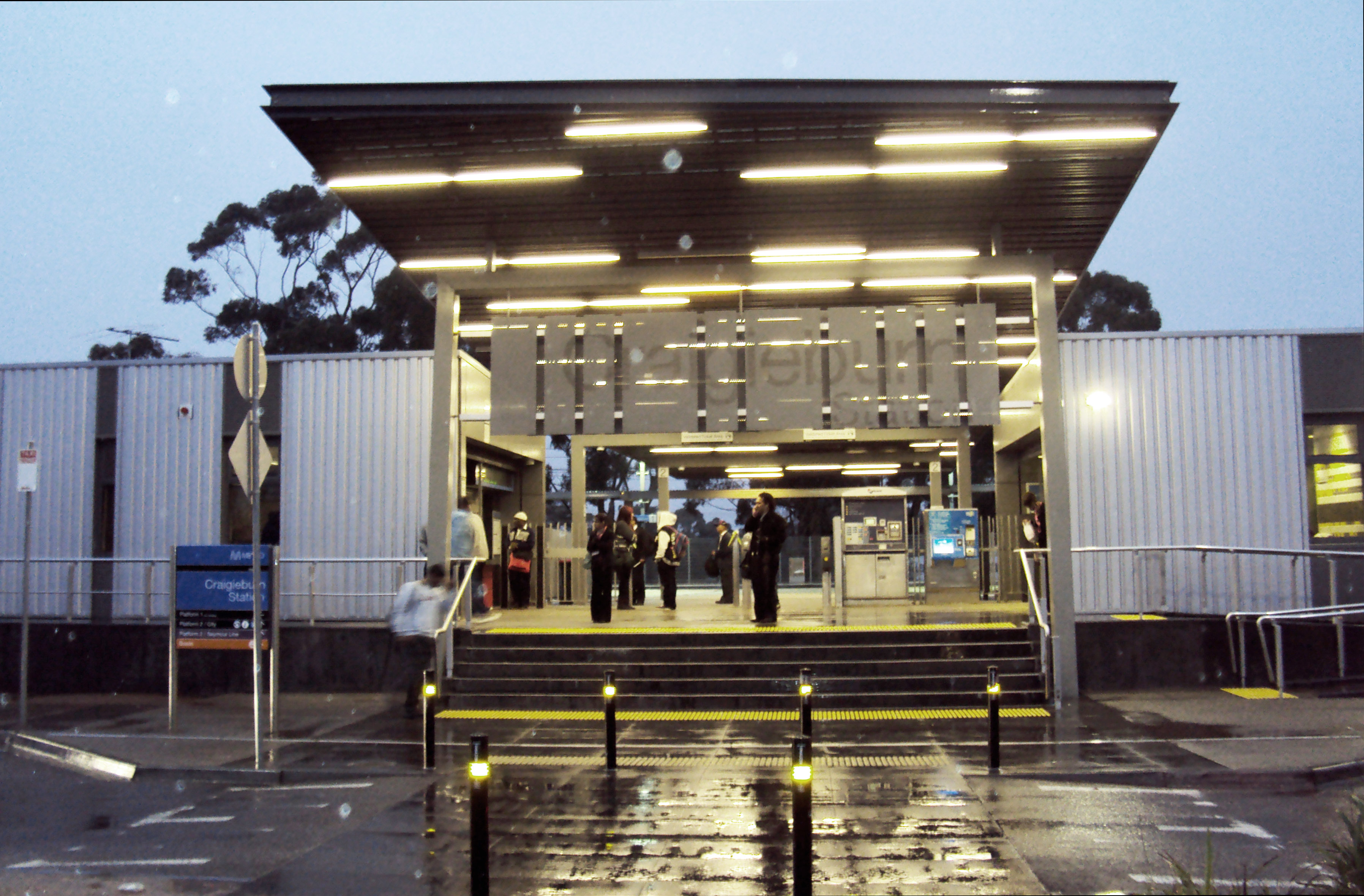
Craigieburn railway station, Melbourne

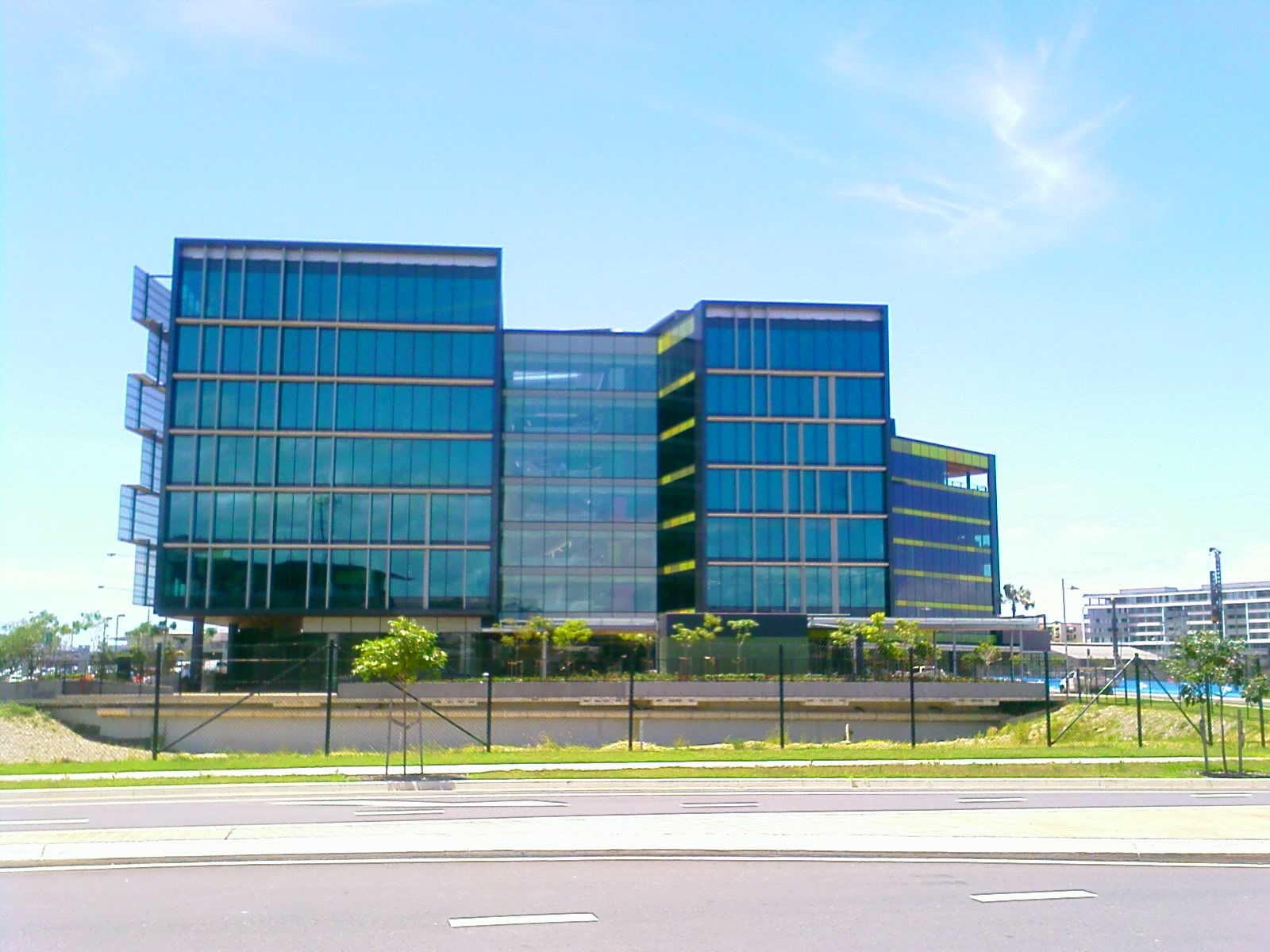
Energex headquarters located in Newstead, Brisbane

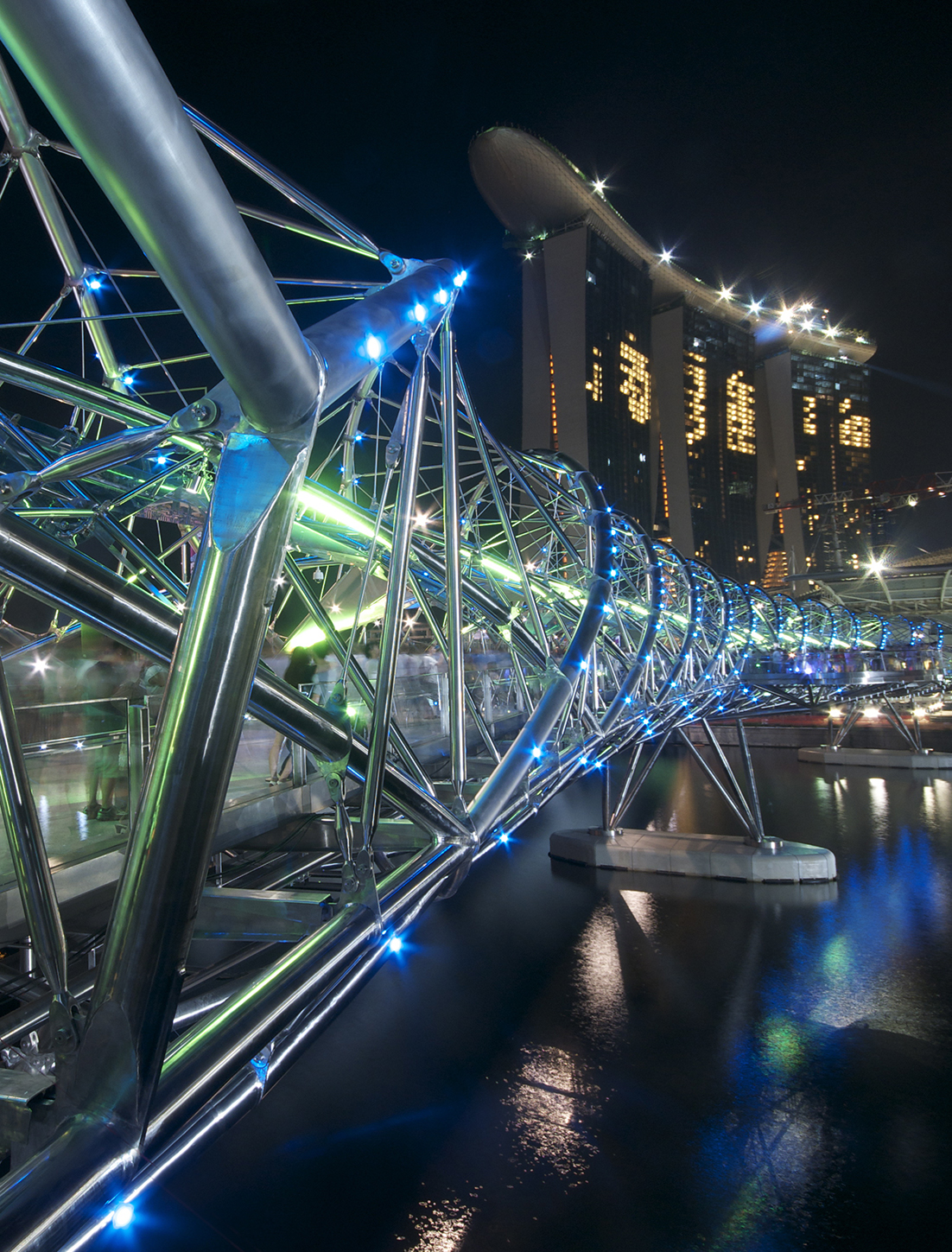
The Helix bridge at night, located in Marina Bay, Singapore

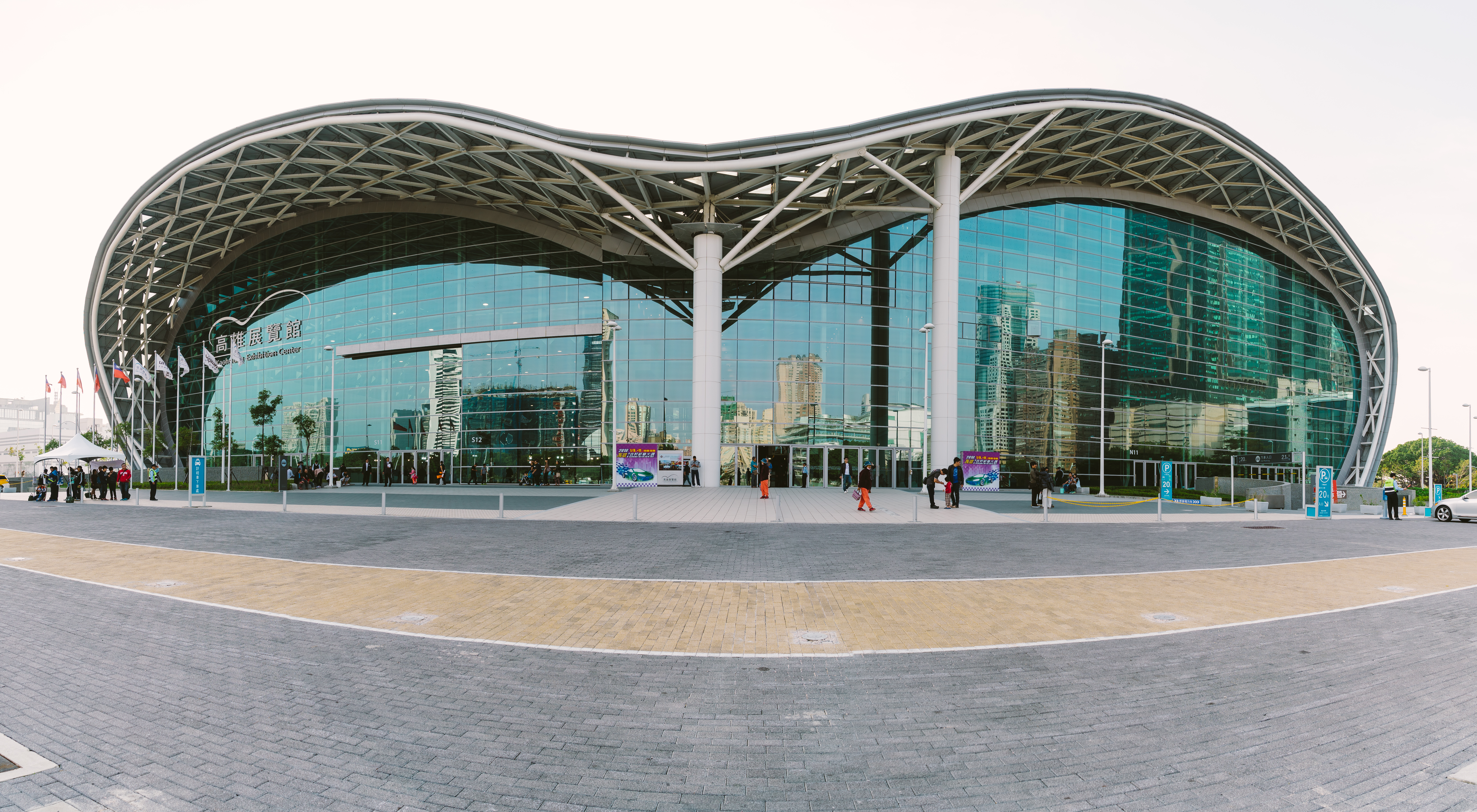
Kaohsiung Exhibition Center located in Kaohsiung, Taiwan

Philip Sutton Cox AO FAHA is an Australian architect. He is the founding partner of Cox Architecture, one of the largest architectural practices in Australia. His work has won him multiple awards, the first being in 1963, one year after graduating from the University of Sydney.

== Early years and education ==
Philip Sutton Cox grew up in Killara on the North Shore in Sydney.

Cox attended Gordon Public School and then the Sydney Church of England Grammar School (Shore) in North Sydney. In his first years at Shore, art was taught by John Lipscombe, who had helped plan the new art block which had been praised by the architect Harry Seidler, who had lectured in the building in July 1952. Cox decided at quite an early age that he wanted to be an architect, though this was not clear until it was nearly time to leave school. He won a Commonwealth scholarship which was to pay his fees.

Cox studied at the University of Sydney School of Architecture, Design and Planning between 1957 and 1962, where he graduated with a Bachelor of Architecture, then at the University of New South Wales between 1970 and 1975, where he was awarded a Doctorate of Science.

== Career ==
Cox commenced his first practice with Ian McKay in 1962, and in 1967 he founded his own practice, Philip Cox and Associates.

Shortly after he had graduated in 1980, Michael Rayner joined Philip Cox & Partners, working closely with Cox for the next ten years. Rayner was responsible for designing noted public buildings, including Australian National Maritime Museum and the Sydney Exhibition Centre (now demolished) in Darling Harbour. In 1990 Rayner moved to Brisbane and established Cox Rayner Architects.

The firm grew, becoming become Cox Architecture, with offices across Australia as well as in Dubai and Abu Dhabi.

Involved in much of concept design for each project over 50 years, Cox stepped back from the business in 2015. Cox Architecture is responsible for projects throughout Australia and also in Southeast Asia, China, the Middle East, South Africa, and Europe.

Cox has been described as "epitomising the Sydney School of Architecture" in earlier projects.

== Awards and honours ==
Cox has won many architectural awards, the first being in 1963, one year after graduating from the University of Sydney.

Cox has received the Royal Australian Institute of Architects Gold Medal in 1984, the Sir Zelman Cowen Award for Public Architecture in 1985. His was given Life Fellowship to the RAIA in 1987 and Honorary Fellowship of the American Institute of Architects in the same year.

In 1988 he was appointed an Officer of the Order of Australia in recognition of service to architecture.

In 1993 he received the inaugural award for Sport and Architecture from the International Olympic Committee, and was elected a Fellow of the Australian Academy of the Humanities in the same year.

== Other roles ==
Cox has held a range of voluntary positions during his professional career including Vice President, Environment Board, RAIA, NSW Chapter; a Member, Historic Buildings Committee, Cancer Patients Assistance Society of NSW; Vice President, Cancer Patients Assistance Society of NSW; Vice Chairman, Architecture and Design Panel, Visual Arts Board, Australia Council; and Chairman of Education Board of the RAIA, Federal Chapter.

== Major works ==
Cox was the architect responsible for initially implementing the American Radburn design for public housing in New South Wales.

Cox and his firm have designed many iconic public buildings in Australia and throughout South East Asia, including a number of the buildings used for the 2000 Summer Olympics. The following list provides a summary of some of the major architectural design works of Cox and his firm, ordered from earliest to most recent, where Cox has either worked individually or as part of consortia:

Completed	Project name	Location	Award	Notes
1963	St Andrews Presbyterian Church	Leppington, South-western Sydney, New South Wales	Sir John Sulman Medal, 1963	(demolished)
1965	C B Alexander Agricultural College	Tocal, New South Wales	Sir John Sulman Medal, 1965; Blacket Prize, 1965	
1969	Hawkins Residence	19 Norma Crescent, Cheltenham	Wilkinson Award, 1969	
1975	Embassy of Ireland	20 Arkana Street, Yarralumla, Australian Capital Territory		
1977	Jerilderie Court Medium Density Housing	17 Allambee Street, Reid, Australian Capital Territory	CS Daley Medal, 1978; Sir Roy Grounds Award for Enduring Architecture, 2005	
1977	Bruce Stadium	Bruce, Australian Capital Territory		
1985	Ayers Rock Resort	Yulara, Northern Territory	Sir Zelman Cowen Award for Public Architecture, 1985; National Award for Enduring Architecture, 2014; New South Wales Enduring Architecture Award, 2014	
1987	Haileybury Chapel	Springvale Road, Melbourne, Victoria		
1988	Sydney Convention & Exhibition Centre	Darling Harbour, Sydney, New South Wales	Sir John Sulman Medal, 1989	(demolished 2013)
1988	Rod Laver Arena	Flinders Park, Melbourne, Victoria		1995
1991	Australian National Maritime Museum	Darling Harbour, Sydney, New South Wales		
1988	Sydney Football Stadium	Moore Park, Sydney, New South Wales		(demolished 2019)
1995	Brisbane Convention & Exhibition Centre	South Bank, Brisbane, Queensland		
1994	Sydney Olympic Park Aquatic Centre	Sydney Olympic Park, Sydney, New South Wales		
1997	Sydney Harbour Casino	Darling Harbour, Sydney, New South Wales		
1999	Sydney SuperDome	Sydney Olympic Park, Sydney, New South Wales		
1999	Singapore Expo	Changi, Singapore		
2001	National Wine Centre of Australia	North Terrace, Adelaide, South Australia		
1996	Cairns Convention Centre	Cairns, Queensland		
2000	Princess Alexandra Hospital Redevelopment	Woolloongabba, Brisbane, Queensland		
2001	Goodwill Bridge	South Bank, Brisbane, Queensland		
2002	WA Maritime Museum	Victoria Quay, Fremantle, Western Australia		
2004	Brisbane Magistrates Court	George Street, Brisbane, Queensland		
2005	Challenger Institute of Technology, Marine Campus	Fremantle, Western Australia		
2006	Northern Stand, Melbourne Cricket Ground			
2007	National Institute of Circus Arts	Prahran, Melbourne, Victoria	Award for Architectural Steel Design – Large Project, Australian Steel Institute VIC (2008)	
2008	District Court of Western Australia	Perth, Western Australia		
2008	Australian Film, Television and Radio School	Moore Park, Sydney, New South Wales	State Commendation for Commercial Architecture, AIA NSW (2010)	
2010	Energex Headquarters	Newstead, Brisbane, Queensland		
2010	The Helix	Marina Bay, Singapore		
2010	AAMI Park	Sports & Entertainment Precinct, Melbourne, Victoria	World's Most Iconic and Culturally Significant Stadium, World Stadium Congress (2012); National Award for Public Architecture, AIA (2011); Victorian Architecture Medal, AIA VIC, (2011); William Wardell Award for Public Architecture, AIA VIC (2011); Colorbond Award for Steel Architecture, (2011); Melbourne Prize, (2011)	
2012	One One One Eagle Street	Brisbane, Queensland	John Dalton Award for Building of the Year, AIA QLD (2013); Corian Design Awards Winner (Project) (2015)	
2012	Queensland Performing Arts Centre Refurbishment	South Bank, Brisbane, Queensland	Interior Design Impact Award, AIDA (2016)	
2013	Neuroscience Research Australia	Randwick, Sydney, New South Wales	The People's Choice Award, Randwick City Council (2013)	
2014	Kaohsiung Exhibition Center	Kaohsiung, Taiwan	Excellence Award, Chinese Institute of Engineers (2014)	
2015	Carnarvon Police and Justice Complex	Carnarvon, Western Australia		
2015	Newcastle Courthouse	Newcastle, New South Wales		
2015	Indonesia Convention Exhibition	BSD City, Tangerang, Indonesia		
2016	Anna Meares Velodrome	Chandler, Brisbane, Queensland	Venue for 2018 Commonwealth Games	
2018	Sir John Monash Centre	Villers-Bretonneux, France		
2018	Jakarta International Velodrome	Jakarta, Indonesia		
2020	National Maritime Museum of China	Tianjin, China		
2020	Christchurch Justice and Emergency Services Precinct	Christchurch, New Zealand		
2021	Oman Across Ages Museum	Muscat, Oman	Special prize for an Exterior, Prix Versailles (2024)	

== Personal life ==
Cox is separated from wife Louise Cox AO, a fellow architect. They married in Sydney in April 1972 and have two daughters.

His longtime partner is the journalist Janet Hawley.
