= Rosemary Hunter =

Australian academic

Rosemary Hunter is an Australian academic who is Professor of Socio-Legal Studies and founding Head of Law at Loughborough University. She was previously Professor and Head of Kent Law School.

Before moving to England, Hunter was Dean of the Griffith law school and prior to that a Senior Lecturer in Law at the University of Melbourne.

In 1998, Hunter and Helen McKelvie were commissioned to produce a report named Equality of Opportunity for Women at the Victorian Bar. The report resulted in the formation of a working group to address systemic discrimination at the Bar.

Hunter is also a feminist who has written books such as Indirect Discrimination in the Workplace. In this work she argued that many apparently neutral employer policies effectively disadvantage women and people from minority groups. For example, a height requirement for security guards would effectively exclude many women and Asians.

Hunter was also a vocal supporter of Di Fingleton, during her imprisonment for the offence of intimidation of a witness. Fingleton's conviction was later overturned by the High Court of Australia.

Hunter is a supporter of affirmative action for women. She has undertaken a number of funded research projects and research consultancies in the field of family law and procedure.

Hunter is a Fellow of the Academy of Social Sciences (FAcSS).
