= Diane Fingleton =

Australian magistrate

Diane McGrath Fingleton

Magistrate in the Queensland Magistrates Court
- In office November 1995 – 2002
- In office 2005 – May 2010

Chief Magistrate of Queensland
- In office August 1999 – 2002
- Preceded by: Stan Deer
- Succeeded by: Marshall Irwin

Personal details
- Born: 11 January 1947 (age 79)
- Education: St. Stephen's Cathedral School; All Hallows' School
- Occupation: Judge, lawyer

Diane McGrath Fingleton (born 11 January 1947) is a former magistrate in the Queensland Magistrates Court, most notable for being appointed Chief Magistrate and later being convicted of the offence of intimidation of a witness, before the conviction was quashed on appeal to the High Court of Australia.

== Early life ==
Fingleton was educated at St. Stephen's Cathedral School and All Hallows' School, in Brisbane. She was a stenographer on Bill Hayden's staff in the Whitlam government years. She studied at university in the late 1970s and early '80s, and graduated with a law degree. She waitressed at night and studied by day.

== Magistracy ==
In 1995, the Goss government appointed her to the magistracy and the Beattie government made her a senior magistrate three years later, just as it would appoint a dozen women (and 11 men) to various judicial appointments that upset Queensland's legal establishment.

In 1999, Fingleton was appointed to the position of Chief Magistrate. This appointment was seen as controversial amid suggestions that it was political. Appointed by Matt Foley, she was Queensland's first ever female Chief Magistrate.

The following year, Fingleton attracted criticism from Chief Justice of the Supreme Court Paul de Jersey and others for holding reconciliation ceremonies in six Magistrates Courts in Queensland and issuing a formal apology to indigenous peoples.

=== Conviction ===
In 2002, Fingleton emailed a fellow Magistrate, Basil Gribbin, threatening to have him dismissed from the senior position of Co-ordinating Magistrate, whilst retaining his position as Magistrate, because he had supported a colleague in a workplace dispute against her. Before sending the email, Fingleton obtained legal advice from her solicitor, David Searle. Fingleton viewed Gribbin's action as evidence he had no faith in her role as Chief Magistrate, perceiving his behaviour to be openly provocative and disloyal. Gribbin took legal action against her, and this resulted in her being charged and imprisoned for retaliation against a witness, a criminal offence under the Queensland Criminal Code. The crown brought in a prosecutor from NSW, Margaret Cunneen. Fingleton appealed, and the Queensland Court of Appeal appeal upheld her conviction but halved her jail sentence.

Released later that year, Fingleton worked as a lecturer at Griffith University.

== Appeal to the High Court ==
Fingleton v R
- Court: High Court of Australia
- Decided: 23 June 2005
- Citations: Fingleton v R [2005] HCA 34, (2005) 227 CLR 166
- Transcripts: [2004] HCATrans 380 (8 October 2004) Special leave; [2005] HCATrans 5 (1 February 2005); [2005] HCATrans 6 (2 February 2005)

Case history
- Prior action: [2002] QCA 266
- Appealed from: Queensland Court of Appeal

Court membership
- Judges sitting: Gleeson CJ, McHugh, Gummow, Kirby, Hayne & Heydon JJ

Fingleton sought special leave to take her case to the High Court of Australia. On 8 October, the day before the 2004 federal election, Justices McHugh and Gummow granted her special leave to appeal. The decision to grant leave was made 73 minutes into the hearing. Justice McHugh said that:

It would be hard to imagine a stronger case of a miscarriage of justice in the particular circumstances of the case. There is not only a question of conviction and a gaol sentence, but the applicant has lost one of the most important offices in the State of Queensland.

The following year, in 2005, the High Court unanimously allowed the appeal and quashed Fingleton's conviction. Their reasoning was that Fingleton in fact had immunity from criminal prosecution under the Queensland Magistrates Court Act for anything done in the course of her judicial or her administrative functions. Justice Kirby described what happened to Fingleton as "indelible".

Professor Rosemary Hunter, a supporter of Diane Fingleton and former Dean of the Griffith law school, has argued that Fingleton's case has raised a range of issues around party politics, gender politics and office politics.

== Present ==
Later that year, Fingleton was again appointed and sworn in as a magistrate of the Caloundra Magistrates Court. She retired in May 2010. She continued to serve at board appointments and speaker engagements. In 2017, Ms Fingleton was special guest speaker at the 50th anniversary event for human rights and legal advocacy organisation, Queensland Council for Civil Liberties (QCCL) in Brisbane.

== Filmography ==
Swimming Upstream, her brother Tony's autobiographical film about his background and family, includes brief glimpses of his younger sister, Diane. The film was released in 2003 and was very well received.
