= Oman Across Ages Museum =

Museum in Oman

Coordinates: 22.7781°N 57.5575°E

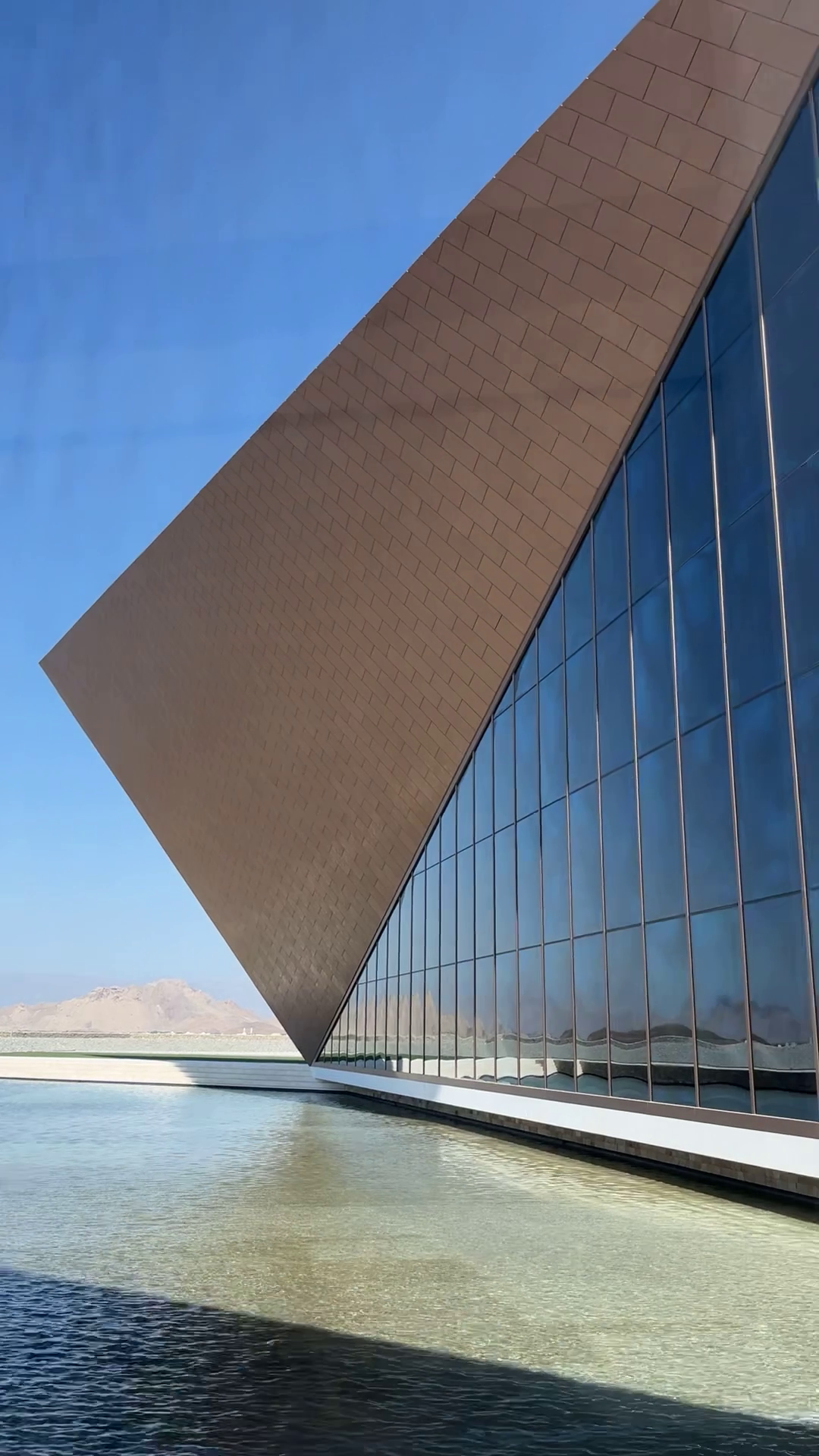
- Established: 2023
- Architect: Cox architects
- Website: oaam.om

Oman Across Ages Museum is a museum in Oman. The foundation stone of the museum was laid by the sultan Qaboos bin Said in 2015. In 2023, the museum was inaugurated by the sultan Haitham bin Tariq. The museum was designed by Cox Architects. The design of the museum was inspired by the Hajar Mountains.

== Location and purpose ==
The museum is located in the Wilayat of Manah in Ad Dakhiliyah Governorate. Its stated mission is to promote understanding of Oman’s character, history and Renaissance for both national and international audiences. The museum presents Oman’s cultural heritage and development over time, with particular attention to the country’s modern history and future development.

== Architecture and exhibitions ==
The building was designed by Cox Architecture and is shaped by the surrounding landscape of the Al Hajar Mountains. Cox Architecture describes the museum as a series of angular geometric forms emerging from the landscape, with the building designed to support galleries, a library, an auditorium, education spaces, social areas and research facilities. The project has a gross floor area of 38,600 square meters.

The museum’s exhibition design uses immersive and high-technology experiences to present Oman’s history from prehistory to the modern period. According to Cox Architecture, the visitor journey gives special attention to Oman’s modern renaissance since the 1970s, while also connecting the country’s past, present and future.

== Facilities ==
The museum complex includes visitor and educational facilities such as a museum café, prayer room, cloakroom, accessible toilets, Knowledge Centre, nursery, clinic and museum garden. The museum also lists several bookable spaces, including a multi-purpose hall, auditorium, Idea Lab, Arts Promenade, Museum Court, Museum Garden and Renaissance Court.
