= Magistrates Courts of Queensland =

Lowest court of Australian State

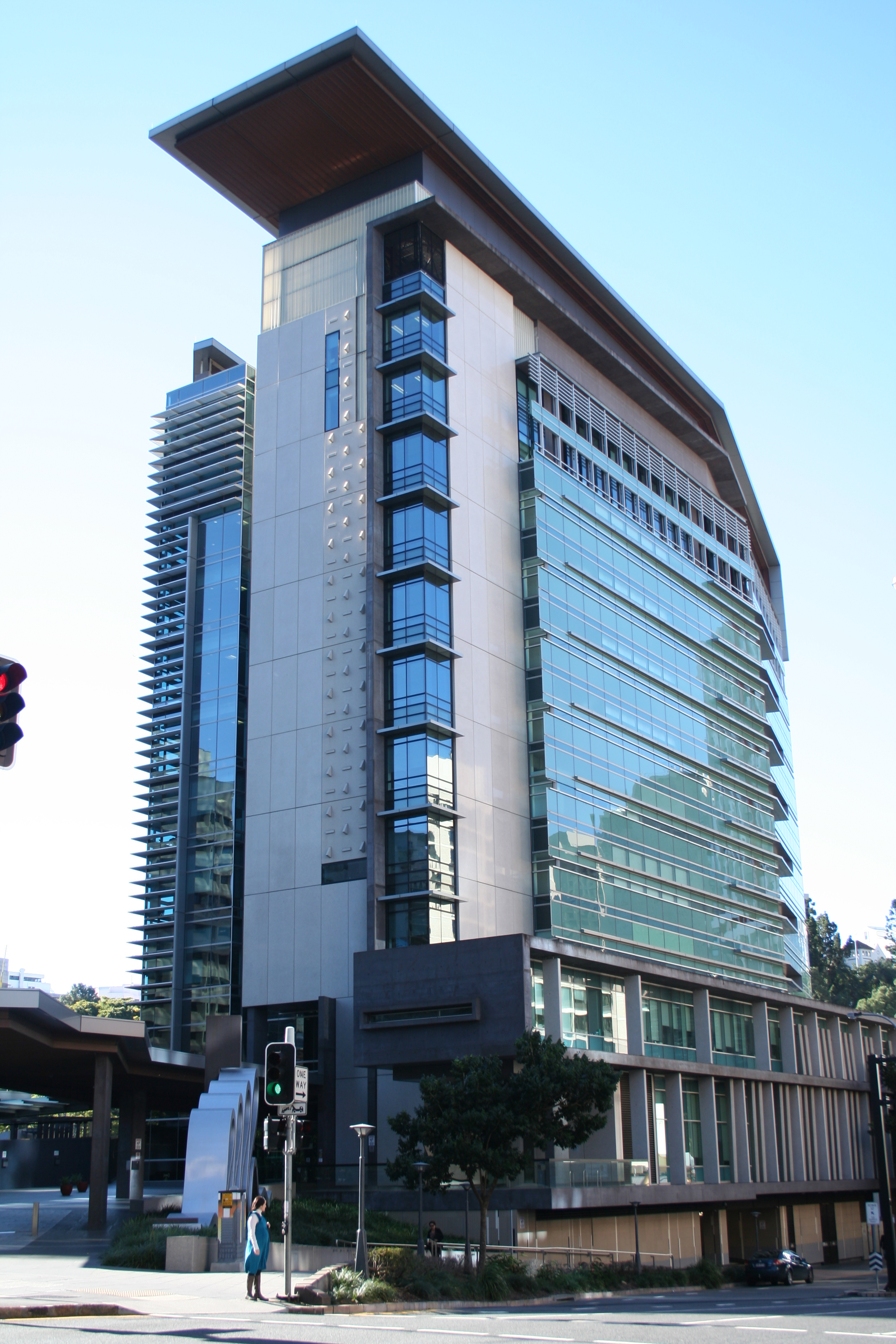
- The Brisbane Magistrates Court building, a location of the Magistrates Court
- Jurisdiction: Queensland
- Location: 130 locations across Queensland
- Composition method: Magistrates appointed by the governor on the advice of the attorney-general
- Authorised by: Magistrates Courts Act 1921 (QLD); Justices Act 1886 (QLD)
- Appeals to: District Court of Queensland
- Judge term length: Mandatory retirement by age 70
- Website: https://www.courts.qld.gov.au/the-courts/magistrates-court

Chief Magistrate of Queensland
- Currently: Judge Janelle Brassington
- Since: 8 July 2022

Deputy Chief Magistrate of Queensland
- Currently: Anthony Gett & Stephen Courtney

The Magistrates Courts of Queensland are the lowest courts in the court hierarchy of Queensland, Australia. All criminal proceedings in Queensland begin in the Magistrates Courts, with minor offences being dealt with summarily, and serious offences being referred to a higher court on the strength of evidence. Most criminal cases are first heard in a Magistrates Court, as are most civil cases. The Magistrates Courts hear approximately 95% of all court cases in Queensland.

Decisions made by a Magistrate Court may be heard on appeal to the District Court of Queensland. Magistrates Courts do not have an appellate jurisdiction.

The Chief Magistrate of Queensland, since 2022, is Judge Janelle Brassington.

== Jurisdiction ==
=== Civil ===
Magistrates Courts have the jurisdiction to decide on civil matters for which the amount in dispute is less than or equal to A$150,000. Civil matters in which the amount in dispute is more than $150,000 are decided by either the District Court or the Supreme Court.

=== Criminal ===
Magistrates Courts have the jurisdiction to decide on charges of summary offences, and indictable offence which may be heard summarily. The maximum penalty that can be imposed by a magistrate is three years imprisonment (four years imprisonment when sitting as the Drug and Alcohol Court).

Magistrates Courts also conducts committal hearings in which the presiding magistrate decides, based on the strength of the evidence, whether to refer the matter to a higher court.

== History ==
The tradition of magistrates was inherited from the English legal system on settlement, with magistrates initially being synonymous with justices of the peace. Initially, magistrates were appointed by the governor (and later on the advice of the elected government) to perform a wide variety of administrative or legal tasks and required no formal legal training or experience. Over time, magistrates split from justices of the peace, with former gaining more responsibilities of a judicial nature. What were then known as police magistrates could adjudicate at the Courts of Petty Sessions, to the exclusion of justices of the peace since 1909. In 1941, police magistrates were renamed "stipendiary magistrates". In 1964, the courts of petty session were merged with other smaller courts to form the Magistrates Courts, hearing both civil and criminal matters. In 1991, magistrates were formally separated from the executive government and no longer classified as public servants with the passage of the Stipendiary Magistrates Act 1991 (Qld).

== Procedure ==
Proceedings must be brought to within the district or division where the alleged offending or conduct occurred.

Those present at court typically include the magistrate, police prosecutor, defendant, plaintiff and witnesses for either party. It is a condition that those who enter the court bow to the Queensland Coat of Arms, situated behind the bench, upon entry. Plaintiffs, defendants, their counsel and witnesses must rise when they wish to address the bench or when addressed by the magistrate.

Members of the media and general public are allowed into the courtroom, except where a party to the proceedings is under 18 in which case the court becomes a child court and the media and public will only have restricted access to the court.

== Notable former magistrates ==
- Di Fingleton
- Basil Gribbin

== See also ==
- Australian court hierarchy
- Judiciary of Australia
- List of Queensland courts and tribunals
