= Basil Gribbin =

Australian judge

Basil Gribbin was a co-ordinating magistrate in the Beenleigh Magistrates Court and a member of the Queensland Magistrates Association, which is the equivalent of a Magistrates Union. Gribbin served as a Magistrate from 9 January 1987 to 10 May 2008.

== Legal career ==
Gribbin commenced his working life as a clerk at the Magistrates Court at Warwick in 1964. He later worked as a registrar in over nine court registries including Springsure, Herberton, Cairns, Beenleigh, Inala and Rockhampton. After being admitted as a legal practitioner in late 1984, he undertook a series of appointments as Acting Magistrate at Herberton, Cairns, Beenleigh, Inala and Rockhampton over a two-year period before being appointed as a Queensland Magistrate.

In 1998, Queensland Courts established a Rules Committee to introduce and monitor the Uniform Civil Procedure Rules. Magistrate Gribbin served as one of the court's two representatives on the committee since its inception — a role he relinquished just prior to his retirement.

== Role in imprisonment of Di Fingleton ==
He is best known for having written an affidavit in 2002 in support of a fellow magistrate named Ann Thacker, who was challenging a decision made by then Chief Magistrate, Di Fingleton to transfer her from Brisbane to Townsville. This resulted in Fingleton sending Gribbin an email asking him to show cause why she should not dismiss him from the position of supervising magistrate. Gribbin responded by accusing her of attempting to pervert the course of justice and trying to interfere with his right to give evidence in support of Thacker. Gribbin referred the matter to the Department of Public Prosecutions (DPP), and this resulted in Fingleton being convicted of the offence of retaliating against a witness. Her conviction was later quashed on appeal in a unanimous decision of the High Court of Australia.
