= Brisbane Magistrates Court building =

Court building in Queensland, Australia

Brisbane Magistrates Court
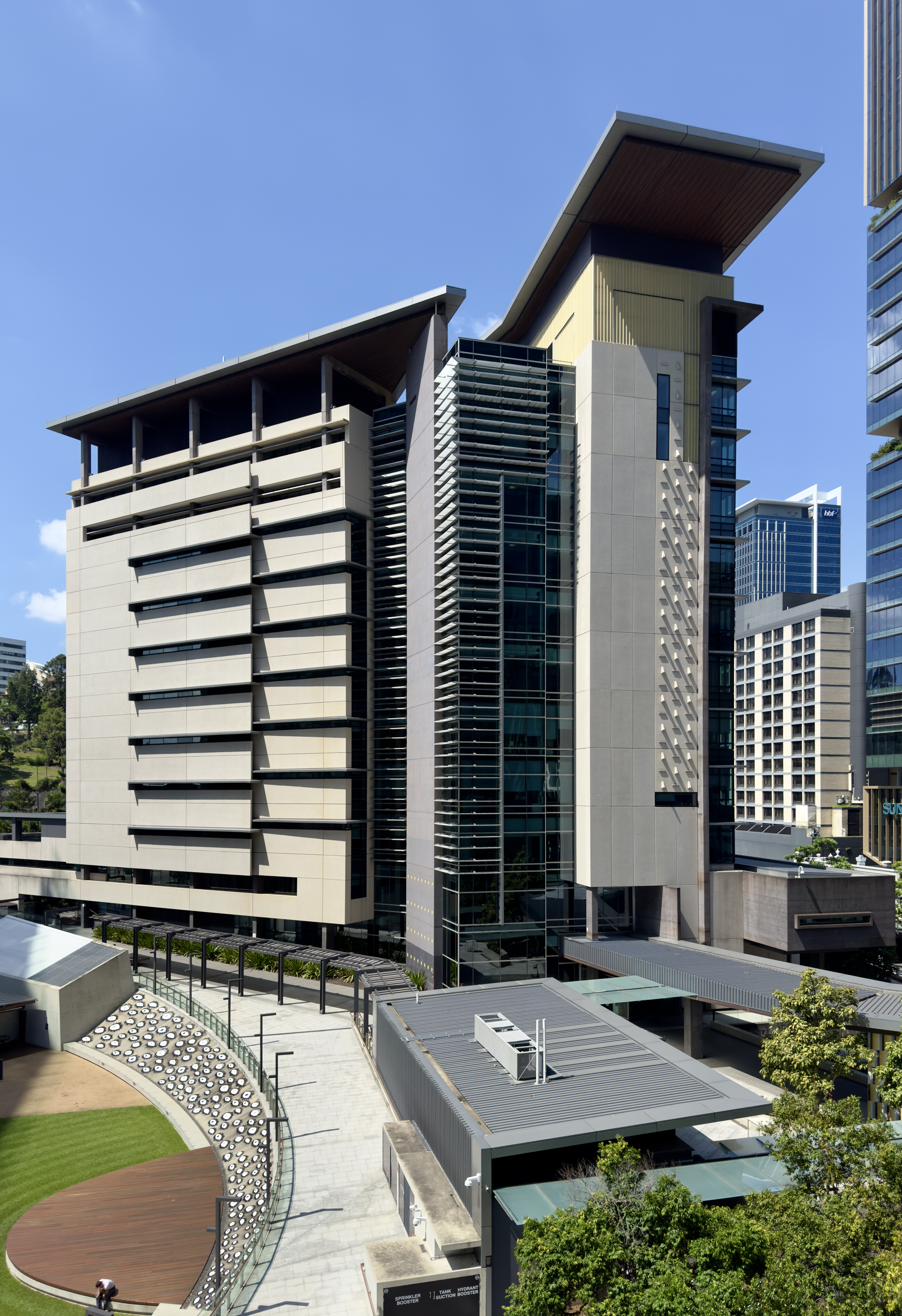
- Interactive map of the Brisbane Magistrates Court area

General information
- Location: Brisbane, Queensland, 363 George Street, Australia
- Coordinates: 27°28′05″S 153°01′18″E
- Current tenants: Magistrates Court of Queensland
- Groundbreaking: 23 September 2002
- Opened: 16 November 2004
- Cost: A$135.5m

Technical details
- Floor count: 14

Design and construction
- Architecture firm: Cox Rayner Architects; AB+M

The Brisbane Magistrates Court building is located at 363 George Street, Brisbane in Queensland, Australia. The building is one of the many locations in the state that houses the Magistrates Court of Queensland.

== Location and features ==
The building is a modern, purpose-built facility which currently contains 26 courtrooms. These include a dedicated Murri Court, two Coroners courts and four Small Claims hearing rooms. The building has the capacity to expand to 39 courtrooms.

Construction started in September 2002 and the building was opened on 16 November 2004 by the Premier, Peter Beattie. The total budget for the project was A$135.5 million.

The building was designed to provide improved support for victims and their families, and to vulnerable witnesses.

It also contains a range of environmentally sustainable design initiatives including economy-cycle air conditioning, energy efficient lighting, rainwater tanks that hold 46 000 litres of water for use on external landscaping, motion sensors that lower air-conditioning and lighting when rooms are unoccupied, extensive use of passive sun control and low energy glass, solar hot water, and waste streaming systems.

== Public art ==
The Brisbane Magistrates Court building is one of the largest infrastructure projects to incorporate the Queensland Government's Art Built-in policy, which requires two per cent of the capital works budget to be spent on art projects within the development. The building features a range of public artworks including sculptures, murals and paintings.

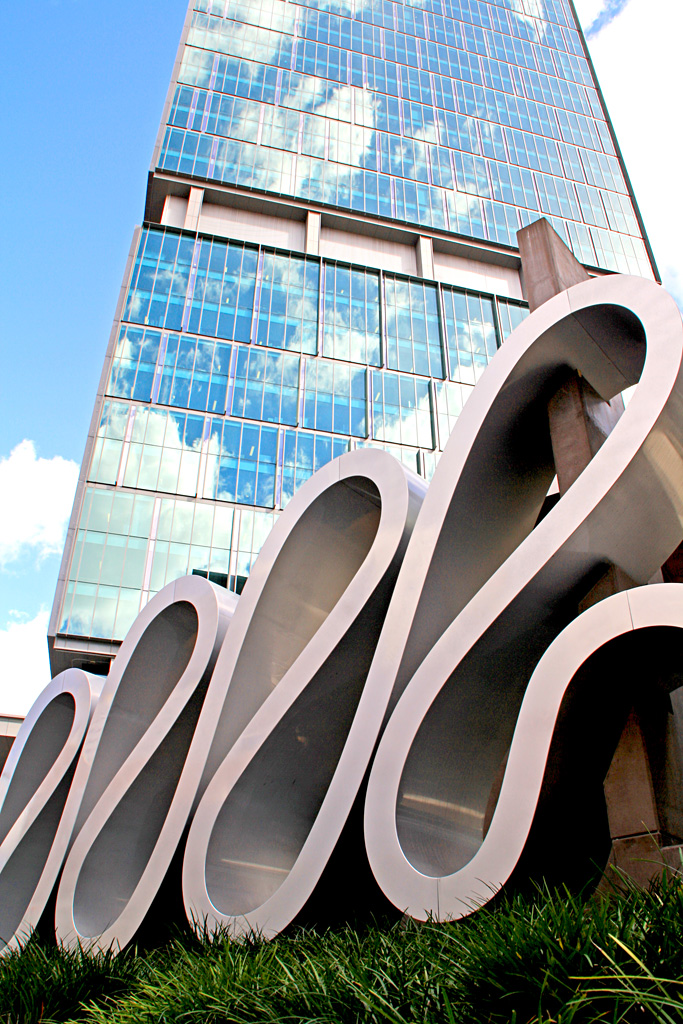
