= Sydney Convention and Exhibition Centre =

Convention and exhibition centre in Sydney

Sydney Convention & Exhibition Centre
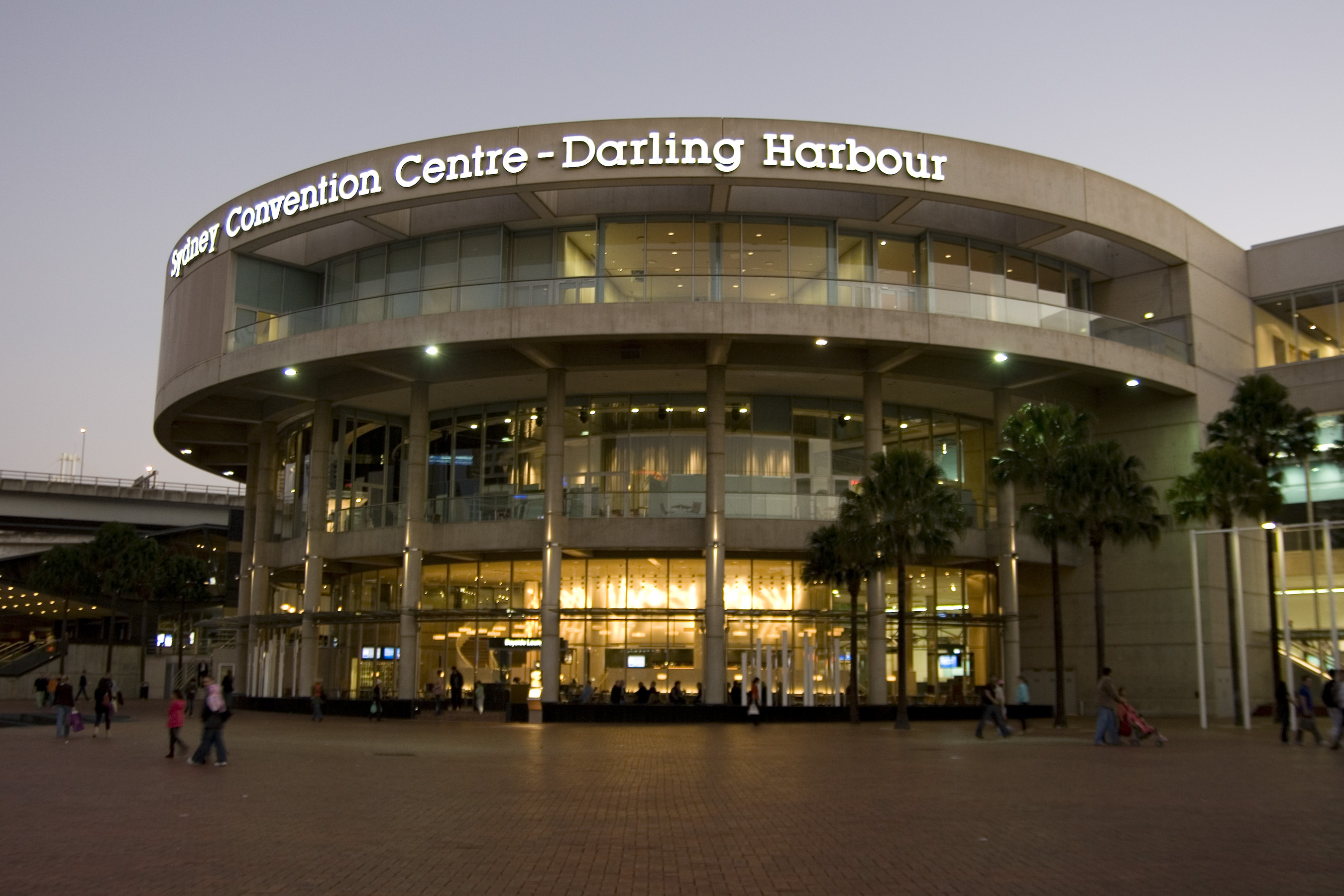
- Sydney Convention & Exhibition Centre
- Former names: Sydney Exhibition Centre; Sydney Convention Centre

General information
- Status: Demolished
- Type: Convention centre
- Architectural style: Modern architecture
- Location: Darling Harbour, Sydney, New South Wales, Australia
- Coordinates: 33°52′33″S 151°12′01″E
- Opened: 5 May 1988
- Demolished: December 2013
- Cost: A$80 million
- Client: Darling Harbour Authority
- Owner: NSW Government

Technical details
- Floor count: 3
- Floor area: 35,000 square metres (380,000 sq ft)

Design and construction
- Architects: Philip Cox; John Andrews
- Architecture firm: Philip Cox Richardson Taylor Partners
- Main contractor: Leighton Contractors

Other information
- Seating capacity: 3,500 (Auditorium)

The Sydney Convention & Exhibition Centre was a convention, exhibition and entertainment complex in Darling Harbour, Sydney. The Exhibition Centre was designed by architect Philip Cox and the Convention Centre by John Andrews. The complex opened on 5 May 1988 as part of an urban renewal and redevelopment of the Darling Harbour area during the period. The complex was controversially demolished in 2013 to make way for the International Convention Centre (ICC Sydney).

== History ==
Built by Leighton Contractors, the Sydney Convention & Exhibition Centre (SC&EC) opened in 1988, with a new section of the centre added for the 2000 Summer Olympics. During those games, the venue played host to the boxing, fencing, judo, weightlifting, and wrestling competitions. The building was owned by the Government of New South Wales, with the centre administration and business run initially by a company Called Arena Meetings Conventions and Exhibitions, which at the time also operated the Sydney Entertainment centre since the date of its opening. They were awarded the contract to commission and operate the site for the first 5 years of its operations. The Accor Hotel Group subsequently gained the second 5-year term on a competitive bid basis. The SC&EC was used as a conference and convention venue and to hold exhibitions, as well as hosting various smaller events such as weddings and meetings. The Convention Centre had around 30 rooms, ranging from small meeting rooms to a 3,500 capacity auditorium, as well as foyer areas and other spaces which can be adapted for use as an exhibition space or pre-dinner function venue. The Exhibition Centre consisted of initially five primary halls, and was subsequently expanded to 6 and was used primarily for exhibitions, but also for gala dinners and other large-scale events.

The SC&EC was used as the biggest building venue for the Sydney Olympic Games outside of Sydney Olympic Park.

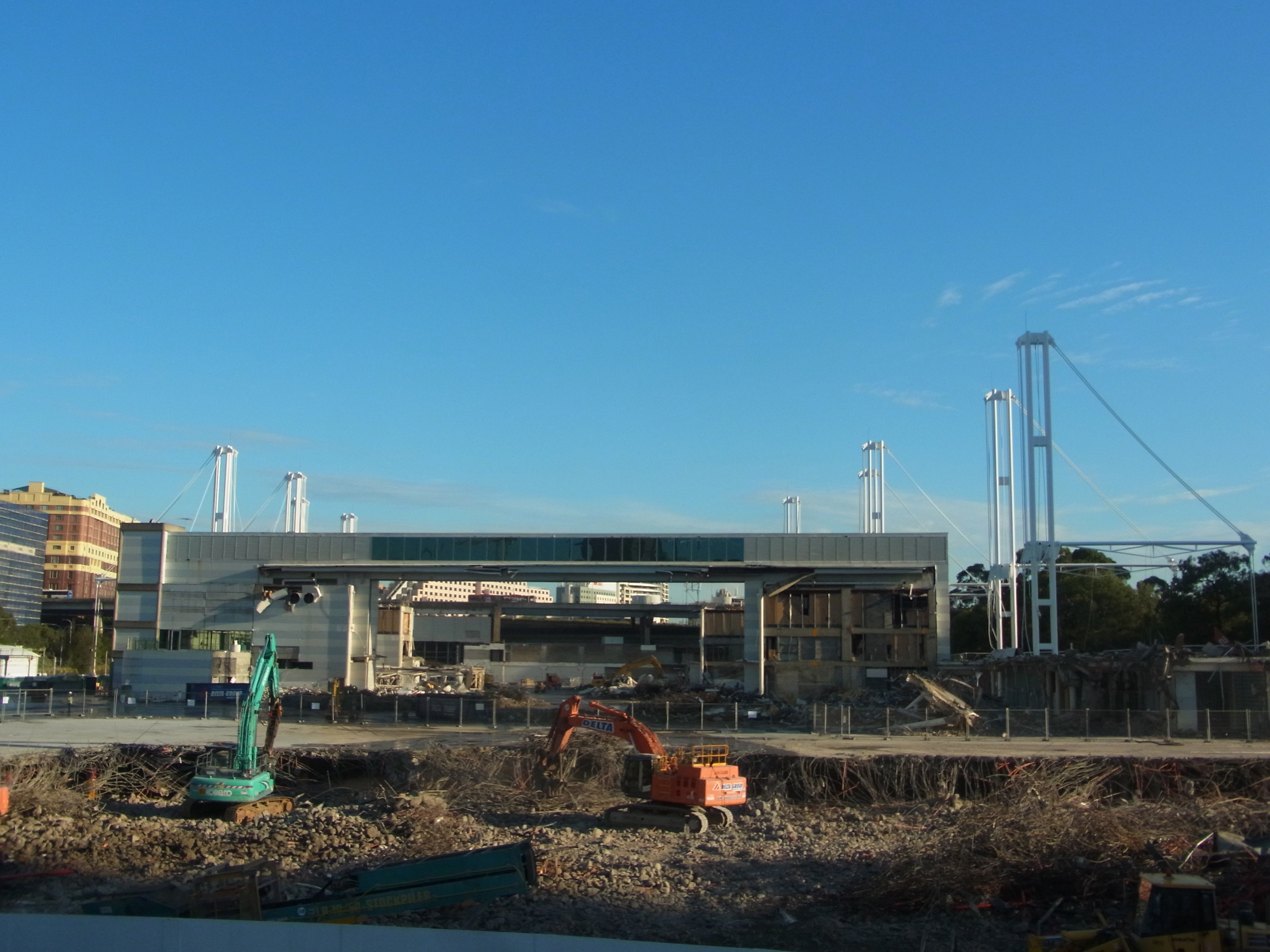
The Exhibition Centre being demolished in March 2014

The SC&EC was a key meeting venue of APEC Australia 2007 in September, 2007 when the political leaders of the 21 member states of the Asia-Pacific Economic Cooperation met. The venue was host to the Business Leader's Summit held in conjunction with APEC Leader's Week. In 2013 it was demolished to make way for the International Convention Centre Sydney.

=== Architecture award ===
The 1989 Australian Institute of Architects Sir John Sulman Medal for Public Architecture was jointly awarded to Philip Cox Richardson Taylor Partners for the SC&EC. The design team was also presented with the 2007 Excellence in Construction Award by the Master Builders Association; were finalists in the 1988 World Quaternario Award; and received a Commendation in Building and Civil Design at the 1988 National Engineering Excellence Awards.

=== Criticism of demolition ===
Architects John Andrews and Philip Cox spoke out over the demolition of the convention and exhibition buildings completed in 1988, blasting the demolition plans as "rather stupid".

The Australian Institute of Architects also supported retention of the Sulman Award-winning Exhibition Centre, stating "we are opposed to the notion that you need to demolish 25‐year old buildings and replace them with new buildings on similar footprints to achieve these improvements."

== Transport ==
The Sydney Monorail and Inner West Light Rail provided public transport to the centre. The monorail opened in 1988 and shut down in 2013. The light rail opened in 1997. The Convention and Exhibition Centre stations are named after the SC&EC.
