= Helix Bridge =

Pedestrian bridge in Singapore

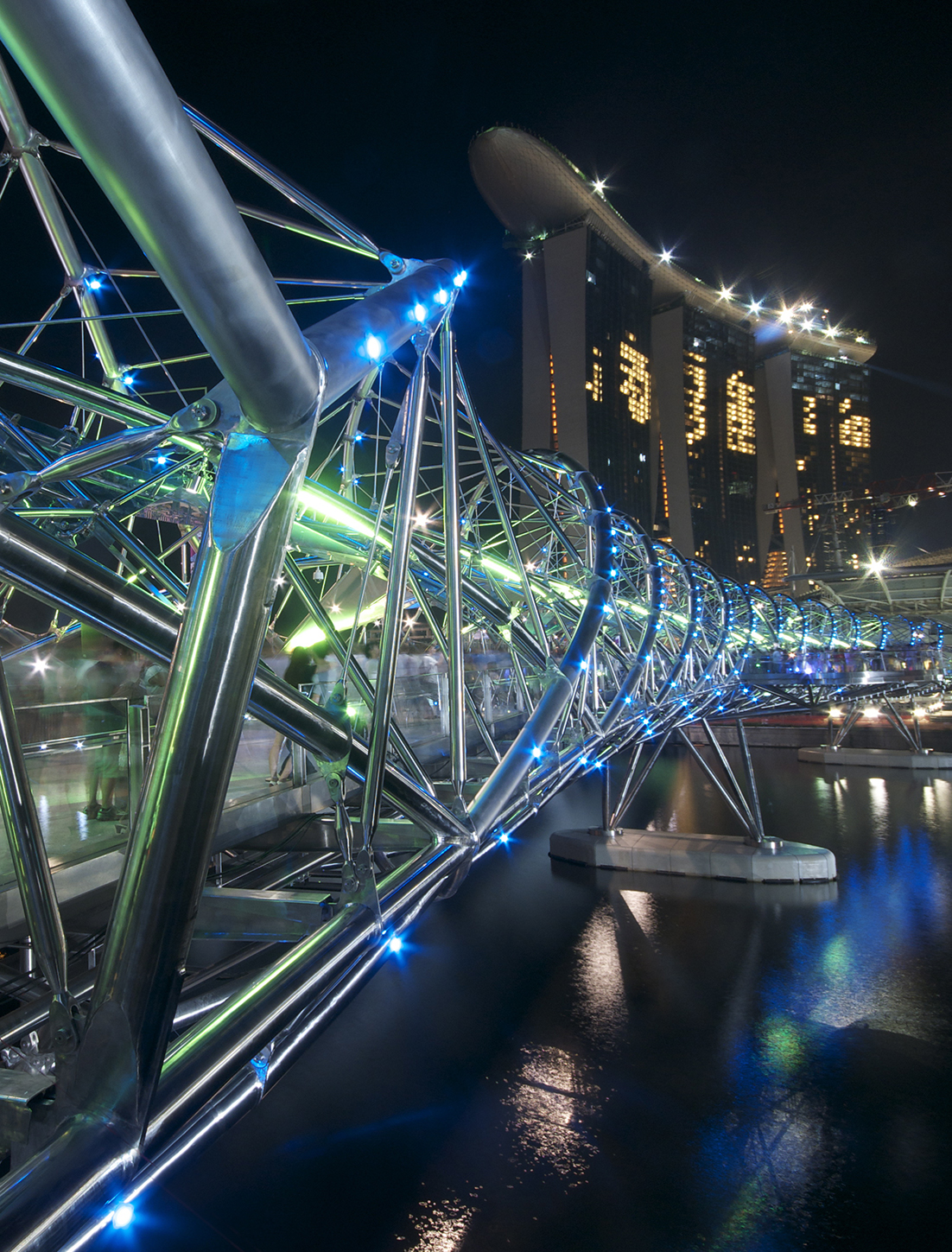
- The Helix Bridge at night
- Coordinates: 1°17′15″N 103°51′40″E
- Carries: Pedestrians
- Crosses: Marina Bay
- Locale: Downtown Core, Singapore
- Official name: The Helix
- Owner: Urban Redevelopment Authority, Singapore

Characteristics
- Material: Stainless steel
- Total length: 280 metres (920 ft)

History
- Architect: COX Group Pte Ltd (Australia) and Architects 61 (Singapore)
- Designer: ARUP Pte Ltd (Australia)
- Constructed by: Sato Kogyo Pte Ltd and TTJ Design and Engineering Pte Ltd
- Construction start: 2007; 19 years ago
- Opened: 24 April 2010; 16 years ago

Location
- Interactive map of Helix Bridge

The Helix Bridge, officially The Helix, and previously known as the Double Helix Bridge, is a pedestrian bridge linking Marina Centre with Marina South in the Marina Bay area in Singapore. It was officially opened on 24 April 2010; however, only half was opened due to ongoing construction at the Marina Bay Sands. The bridge was fully opened on 18 July.

== Architecture ==
The design consortium is an international team comprising Australian architects the Cox Architecture and engineers Arup, and Singapore based Architects 61.

Canopies (made of fritted-glass and perforated steel mesh) are incorporated along parts of the inner spiral to provide shade for pedestrians. The bridge has four viewing platforms sited at strategic locations which provide views of the Singapore skyline and events taking place within Marina Bay. At night, the bridge will be illuminated by a series of lights that highlight the double-helix structure, thereby creating a special visual experience for the visitors.

Pairs of coloured letters c and g, as well as a and t on the bridge which are lit up at night in red and green represent cytosine, guanine, adenine and thymine, the four bases of DNA. The intentional left handed DNA-like design, which is the opposite of normal DNA on earth, earned it a place in The Left Handed DNA Hall of Fame in 2010.

The Land Transport Authority claimed it is a world first in architectural and engineering bridge design. It won the 'World's Best Transport Building' award at the World Architecture Festival Awards in the same year. It has also been recognised by the Building and Construction Authority (BCA) at the BCA Design and Engineering Safety Excellence Awards in 2011.

== Construction ==
The Helix is fabricated from approximately 650 tonnes of Duplex Stainless Steel and 1000 tonnes of carbon steel used in the temporary structure and also helping the bridge to get the helix shape. The construction began in 2007. It was officially opened on 24 April 2010 but partially accessible. The entire bridge was opened on 18 July 2010 to complete the entire walkway around Marina Bay.

=== Fabrication ===
Before any work began on the bridge, a mock-up was made from carbon steel to try to preempt any construction difficulties. Fabrication of the elements worked from north to south; components were assembled into segments that could manage the Singapore roads. A trial assembly was done before delivery to site to identify any prefabrication errors.

=== Quality control ===
The duplex stainless steel used is susceptible to contamination by carbon or zinc dust. So a dedicated workshop was specially set up to keep members for the Helix separate from other carbon and nitrogen steels.

=== Temporary works ===
A temporary truss bridge was built to support the bridge and provide access. The key issue was in launching the trusses over the central 50m wide navigation channel that had to be kept clear during construction to give safe access to other users of the bay.

The truss was launched in segments in a synchronised lift with two mobile crane units. This was done at night to minimise disturbance caused by closing the channel.

=== Permanent works ===
A mobile gantry crane was positioned on the temporary bridge to lift elements into place. Erection started from the North Abutment starting with the horizontal prefabricated segments (av. 11m long). Then the horizontal deck components were bolted on, and then cross members, hoop members, tension rods, and other loose members were installed working upwards from deck level.

The helices and their struts were installed. The individual elements of the helices being welded on the entire span had been erected. These crucial connections were very closely supervised and controlled to ensure the properties of the duplex steel were maintained. Finally a passivation process removed any surface iron compounds which are a potential source of corrosion.

== In popular culture ==
The bridge is featured in the HBO series Westworld, as part of its third season.

== See also ==
- Architecture of Singapore
- List of bridges in Singapore
