= Griffith Law School =

Law school in Queensland, Australia

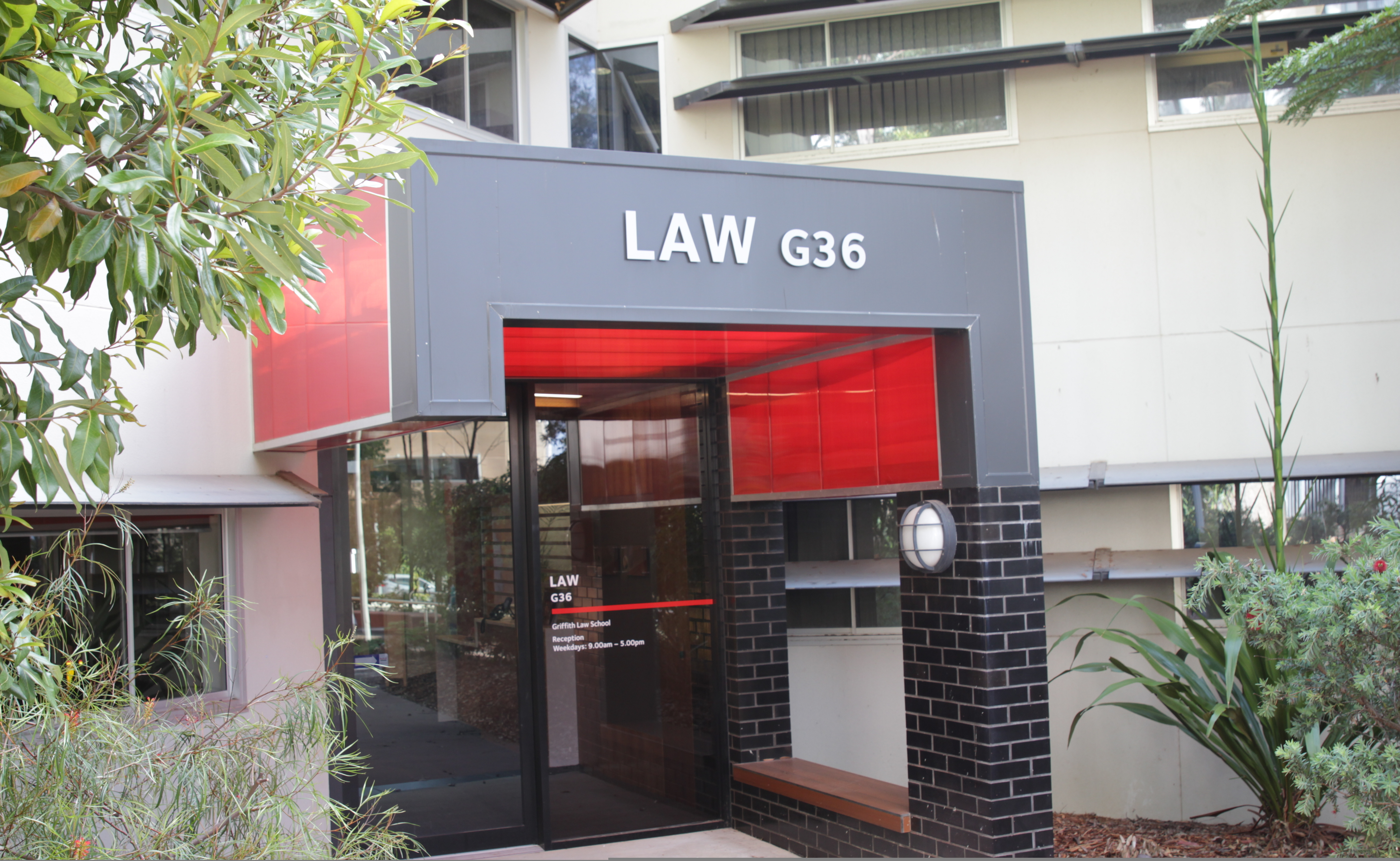
- Griffith Law School, Gold Coast campus
- Parent institution: Griffith University
- Affiliations: Arts, Education and Law
- Dean: Associate Professor Therese Wilson
- Location: Brisbane and Gold Coast, Queensland, Australia
- Website: Official website

Griffith Law School is the law school of Griffith University and is located in Brisbane and the Gold Coast. The school is known for its commitment to social justice, international law and law reform. In the 2018 ShanghaiRanking Global Ranking of Academic Subjects, Law (including Criminology) was ranked 33 in the world, which places Griffith first in Australia.

The Dean and Head of School is Associate Professor Therese Wilson. The Deputy Dean of Learning and Teaching is Dr Kate Van Doore and the Deputy Dean of Research is Professor Elena Marchetti.

== About Griffith Law School ==
Established in 1992 with just 75 students and 5 staff, Griffith Law School was opened by former Governor-General of Australia, Sir Ninian Stephen on 24 February 1992.

Griffith Law School offers a range of undergraduate degrees including double degrees, postgraduate degrees and higher degrees by research.

Griffith Law School helped pioneer clinical legal education in Queensland, which gives law students the opportunity to practice their legal skills on real legal matters, under supervision from legal practitioners. One of the most notable legal clinics offered is the Innocence Project, a pro bono clinic where students and lawyers work to free innocent persons who have been wrongly convicted in Australia.

Griffith Law School publishes three research journals: Australian Feminist Law Journal, Griffith Law Review and the student run Griffith Journal of Law and Human Dignity.

Griffith Law School competes in the Phillip C Jessup Moot Court Competition and the Willem C Vis International Commercial Arbitration Moot. Griffith students have participated in extracurricular moot competitions and found success in the Administrative Appeals Tribunal's Negotiating Outcomes on Time, QUT Torts Moot, Michael Kirby Contract Law Moot and the Aboriginal and Torres Strait Islander Moot.

== Notable alumni ==
- Joshua Creamer, Barrister and 2017 National Indigenous Legal Professional of the Year
- Chris Eigeland, Australia's Youth Representative to the United Nations for 2016
- Andrew Fraser, former Queensland Treasurer
- James McGrath, Liberal Party senator
- The Hon Dr Brett Mason, Ambassador to the Netherlands
- Larissa Waters, former Deputy Leader of the Australian Greens and Senator for Queensland
