= National Maritime Museum of China =

Science museum in Tianjin, China

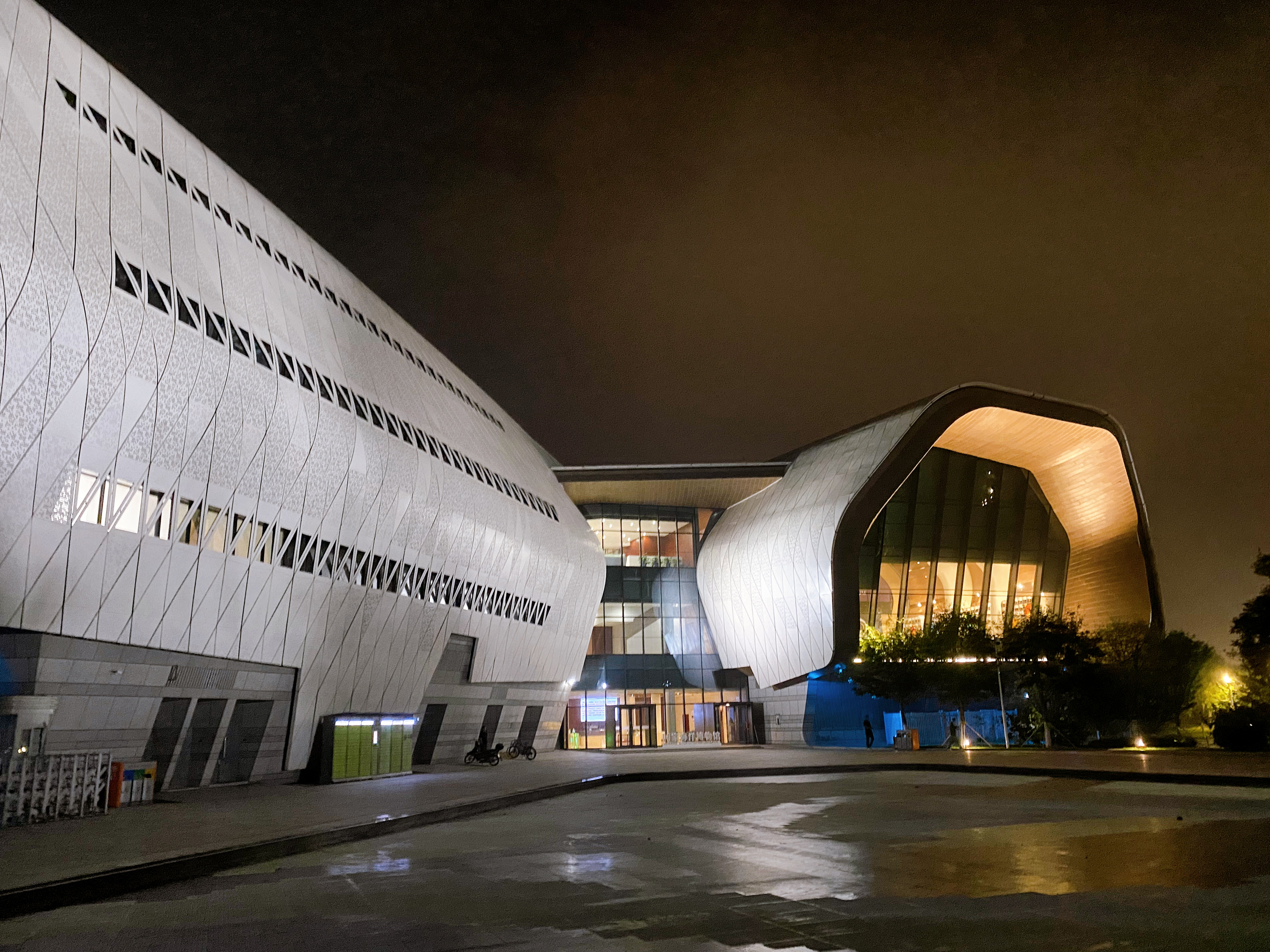
- Established: May 1, 2019
- Location: ChinaTianjin Binhai New Area Sino-Singapore Tianjin Eco-city at the intersection of Rongsheng Road and Haixuan Road
- Coordinates: 39.10551°N 117.78944°E
- Type: Science museum
- Founders: Ministry of Natural Resources of the People's Republic of China, Tianjin Municipal People's Government
- Director: Huang Keli
- Owner: Binhai New Area People's Government
- Website: https://www.nmmc.cc/

The National Maritime Museum of China (Chinese: 国家海洋博物馆) is located in the Binhai Tourism Zone of the Sino-Singapore Tianjin Eco-city in Binhai New Area, Tianjin, China, at the intersection of Rongsheng Road and Haixuan Road. It is a national comprehensive maritime museum jointly established and managed by the Ministry of Natural Resources of the People's Republic of China and the Tianjin Municipal People's Government. It is a public cultural institution under the Binhai New Area People's Government, integrating collection, display, research, and education. The museum opened to the public for trial operation on May 1, 2019, and is the largest maritime museum in the world.

== Background and site selection ==
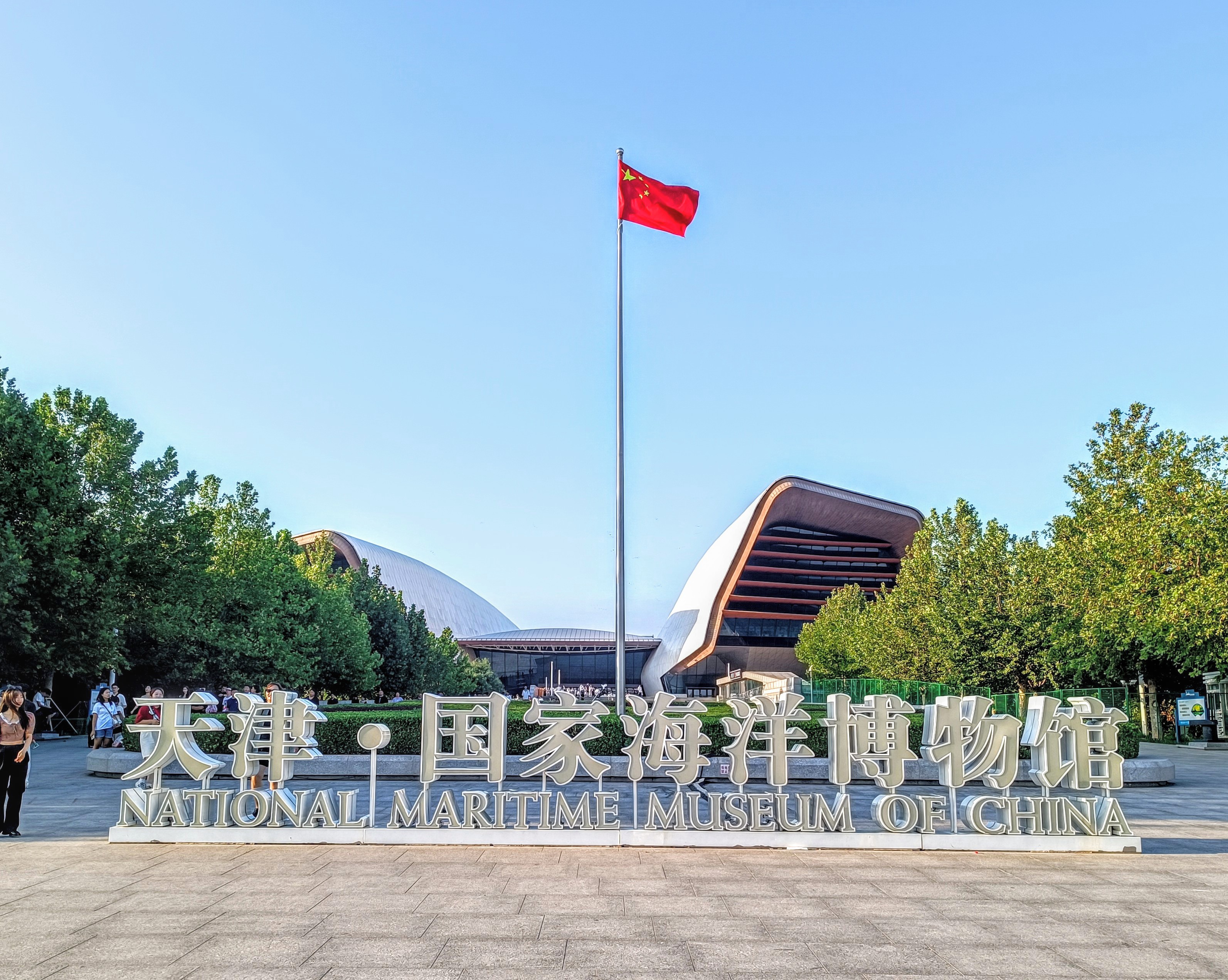
National Maritime Museum of China

In September 2007, over 30 academicians from the Chinese Academy of Sciences and the Chinese Academy of Engineering jointly wrote to the State Council, suggesting the construction of a modern comprehensive maritime museum commensurate with China's status as a major maritime nation. The proposal was approved by the State Council. As the first national maritime museum in China, the site selection for the National Maritime Museum was complex and cautious, with multiple demonstrations conducted by the State Oceanic Administration and other departments since 2008. In April 2008, the Tianjin Municipal Government established a leadership group to apply for the construction of the National Maritime Museum in Tianjin, with then-Mayor Huang Xingguo serving as the group leader.

In April 2010, the National Development and Reform Commission officially approved the site selection for the National Maritime Museum in the eastern coastal area of Binhai New Area, Tianjin, due to its "coastal proximity to the capital" and favorable construction and transportation conditions. The Tianjin Institute of Urban Planning and Design's Binhai Branch and the Tianjin Oceanic Administration collaborated with relevant departments to research major maritime museums worldwide and large specialized museums domestically to provide references for the site selection and construction of the National Maritime Museum in Binhai New Area, Tianjin. After determining the development model and construction scale, the site selection working group inspected four coastal functional areas under the jurisdiction of Binhai New Area: Nangang Industrial Zone, Lingang Industrial Zone, Haigang Logistics Zone, and Binhai Tourism Zone. The Binhai Tourism Zone was finally chosen as the most suitable site for the National Maritime Museum due to its project characteristics and its potential to form a marine-themed cluster with nearby attractions such as the Kiev Aircraft Carrier Theme Park, the Ancient Coast Shell Dike Site, and the Bohai Marine Monitoring Base. Within the Binhai Tourism Zone, the working group identified three potential sites: near the Ancient Shell Dike, east of the Bohai Marine Monitoring Base, and across from the core area of the Binhai Tourism Zone. The site across from the core area was ultimately selected.

== Construction ==
On May 17, 2011, the State Oceanic Administration's Education and Propaganda Center and the Tianjin Oceanic Administration signed an agreement to establish a coordination mechanism for the construction and management of the National Maritime Museum, committing to jointly coordinate the construction of the National Maritime Museum according to the requirements of the State Oceanic Administration and the Tianjin Municipal People's Government.

From November 2012 to February 2013, the National Maritime Museum conducted two global solicitations for architectural design plans. Six units, including GMP International Architecture Design Firm from Germany, Preston Scott Cohen Design Firm from the United States, EMBT Architecture Firm from Spain, KDG Architecture Design Firm from the United States, Waterman International Engineering Company from the United Kingdom, and South China University of Technology, entered the preliminary evaluation. In the second round, the design plan by Australian architect and chief designer of the Sydney Olympic Stadium, Philip Cox, was unanimously approved. Liu Jingliang, Honorary President of the Tianjin Institute of Architectural Design, served as the chief designer on the Chinese side. In 2013, the architectural plan for the National Maritime Museum won the 2013 World Architecture Award, 2013 World Cultural Building Award, and 2013 Best Competition Design Award at the World Architecture Festival held in Singapore.

On March 29, 2013, the Tianjin Municipal People's Government and the State Oceanic Administration decided to establish the National Maritime Museum Management Committee to coordinate and decide on major issues related to the construction and operation of the National Maritime Museum. On April 18, the site selection opinion for the National Maritime Museum project was approved by the Tianjin Planning Bureau.

In October 2014, the main building of the National Maritime Museum commenced construction. In February 2017, the main structure of the National Maritime Museum construction project was topped off. In December 2018, the construction project of the National Maritime Museum passed the final acceptance inspection.

== Exhibitions ==
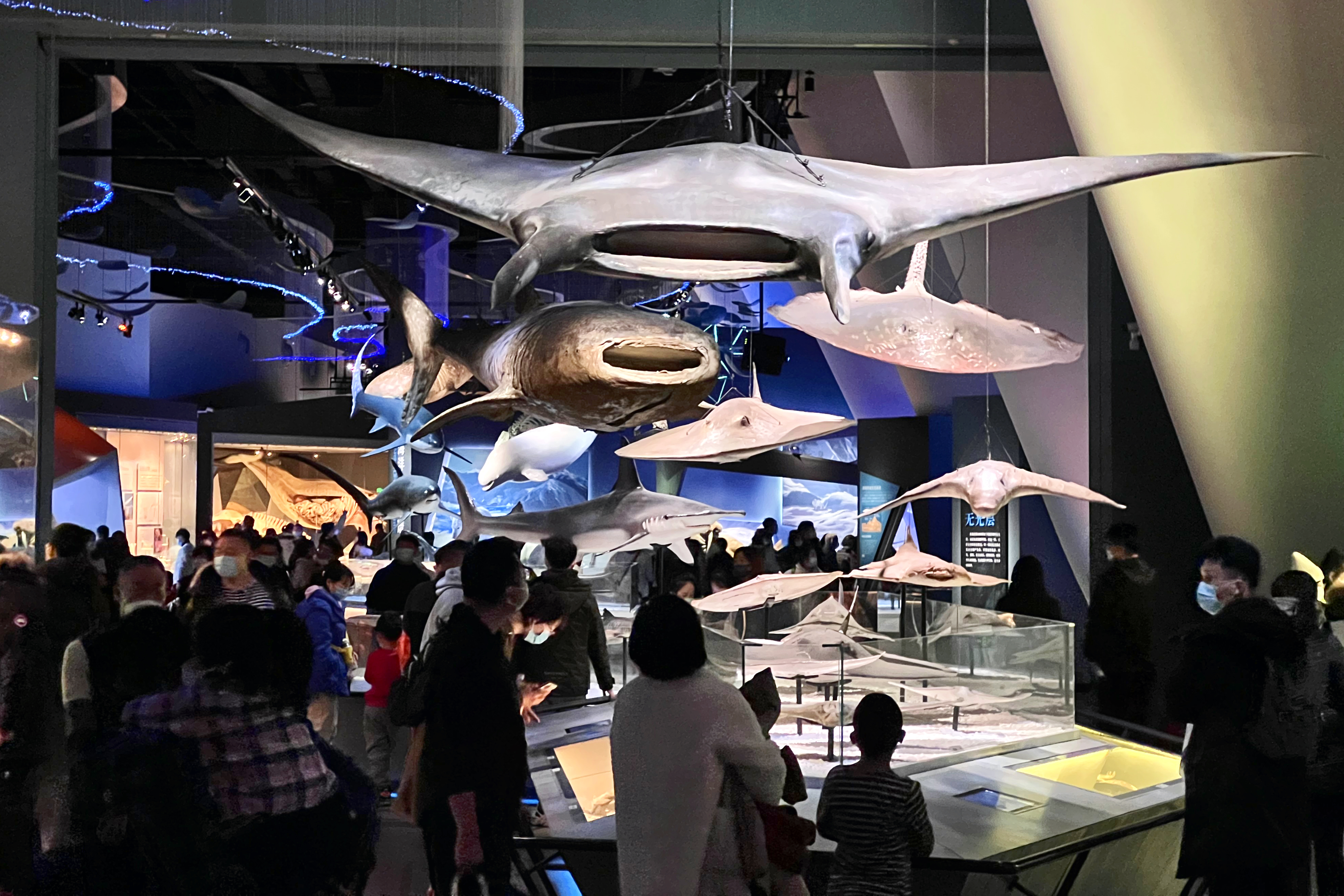
Specimens of marine animals such as manta rays and whale sharks at the National Maritime Museum of China

The National Maritime Museum has six main exhibition areas, each with a specific theme: Marine Life, Marine Ecology, Marine Resources, Marine Transportation, Marine Culture, and Marine Science. The museum houses more than 50,000 exhibits, including numerous rare marine biological specimens and precious marine cultural relics. The exhibition area of the National Maritime Museum is approximately 23,000 square meters, divided into five halls: the Ancient Ocean Hall, the World Ocean Hall, the Chinese Ocean Hall, the Marine Hall, and the Future Ocean Hall. The museum integrates various display methods, including physical objects, models, charts, multimedia, and interactive exhibits, to showcase the vast and mysterious marine world to the public.

The Type 037IG missile boat Yuqing (752) is preserved in the National Maritime Museum.

== See also ==
- List of museums in China
- Tianjin Museum
