= List of South Australian courts and tribunals =

The following is a list of courts and tribunals in South Australia:

== Courts ==
- Aboriginal Sentencing Court
- Coroner's Court of South Australia
- District Court of South Australia
- Environment, Resources and Development Court
- Licensing Court of South Australia
- Magistrates Court of South Australia
- Supreme Court of South Australia
- South Australian Civil and Administrative Tribunal
- South Australian Employment Court
- South Australian Employment Tribunal
- Youth Court of South Australia
