= List of Western Australian courts and tribunals =

The following is a list of courts and tribunals in Western Australia:

== Courts ==
- Magistrates Court of Western Australia
- Drug Court
- Industrial Magistrates Court
- District Court of Western Australia
- Western Australia Industrial Relations Commission
- Children's Court of Western Australia
- Coroner's Court of Western Australia
- Family Court of Western Australia
- Supreme Court of Western Australia

== Tribunals ==
- Criminal Injuries Compensation Assessor of Western Australia
- State Administrative Tribunal of Western Australia
- Strata Titles Referee of Western Australia
- Town Planning Appeal Tribunal of Western Australia
- Western Australian Information Commissioner
