= Small claims court =

Court with limited jurisdiction

Small-claims courts have limited jurisdiction to hear civil cases between private litigants. Courts authorized to try small claims may also have other judicial functions, and go by different names in different jurisdictions. For example, it may be known as a county or magistrate's court. These courts can be found in Australia, Brazil, Canada, England and Wales, Hong Kong, Ireland, Israel, Greece, New Zealand, Philippines, Scotland, Singapore, South Africa, Nigeria and the United States.

== Purpose and operation ==
The jurisdiction of small-claims courts typically encompasses private disputes that do not involve large amounts of money. The routine collection of small debts forms a large portion of the cases brought to small-claims courts, as well as evictions and other disputes between landlords and tenants, unless the jurisdiction is already covered by a tenancy board.

A small-claims court generally has a maximum monetary limit to the amount of judgments it can award, often in the thousands of dollars/pounds. By suing in a small-claims court, the plaintiff typically waives any right to claim more than the court can award. The plaintiff may or may not be allowed to reduce a claim to fit the requirements of this venue. 'Court shopping'—where a plaintiff reduces the damage claim amount to have a trial in a court that otherwise does not have jurisdiction—is strictly forbidden in some states. For example, if a plaintiff asserts damages of $30,000 in hopes of winning an award of $25,000 in small-claims court, the court dismisses the case because the court does not have jurisdiction to hear cases in which asserted damages exceed the court's maximum amount.

Thus, even if the plaintiff is willing to accept less than the full amount, the case cannot be brought to small-claims court. To bring the case to small-claims court, the plaintiff must prove that actual damages are within the court's jurisdiction. In some jurisdictions, a party who loses in a small-claims court is entitled to a trial de novo in a court of more general jurisdiction and with more formal procedures.

The rules of civil procedure, and sometimes of evidence, are typically altered and simplified to make the procedures economical. A usual guiding principle in these courts is that individuals ought to be able to conduct their own cases and represent themselves without a lawyer. Rules are relaxed but still apply to some degree. In some jurisdictions, corporations must still be represented by a lawyer in small-claims court. Expensive court procedures such as interrogatories and depositions are usually not allowed in small-claims court, and practically all matters filed in small-claims court are set for trial. Under some court rules, should the defendant not show up at trial and not have requested a postponement, a default judgment may be entered in favour of the plaintiff.

Trial by jury is seldom or never conducted in small-claims courts; it is typically excluded by the statute establishing the court. Similarly, equitable remedies such as injunctions, including protective orders, are seldom available from small-claims courts.

Separate family courts may exist to hear simple cases in family law. For reasons having more to do with history than with the sort of case typically heard by a small-claims court, most US states do not allow domestic relations disputes in small-claims court.

Winning in small-claims court does not automatically ensure payment in recompense of a plaintiff's damages. This may be relatively easy, in the case of a dispute against an insured party, or extremely difficult, in the case of an uncooperative, transient, or indigent defendant. The judgment may be collected through wage garnishment and liens.

Most courts encourage parties with disputes to seek alternative dispute resolution, if possible, before filing suit. For example, the Superior Court of California, Santa Clara provides guidelines for resolving disputes out of court. Both parties can agree on arbitration by a third party to settle their dispute outside of court.

== History ==
The Mayor's and City of London Court is the successor to the several medieval courts in the City of London, one being the Court of Conscience for recovery of small debts. This was a type of equity court. A similar Court of Conscience was established by charter in some ancient boroughs in Ireland; this was emulated in others, without legal sanction until regularised by the Municipal Corporations (Ireland) Act 1840.

== By region ==
=== Australia ===
Small claims are handled differently by each state and territory, with most relying on tribunals while others have a minor claims division of their respective magistrates court:

- Australian Capital Territory: ACT Civil and Administrative Tribunal has jurisdiction over civil disputes involving amounts up to $25,000
- New South Wales: The Small Claims Division of the Local Court of New South Wales hears civil claims up to $20,000, while the General Division hears civil disputes between $20,000 and $100,000 in value.
- Northern Territory: Northern Territory Civil and Administrative Tribunal has jurisdiction over small claims, which involve amounts up to $25,000
- Queensland: Queensland Civil and Administrative Tribunal deals with minor civil disputes, which involve amounts up to $25,000
- South Australia: Magistrates Court of South Australia hears a minor claim, which is up to $25,000 in value
- Victoria: Victorian Civil and Administrative Tribunal
- Western Australia: Magistrates Court of Western Australia hears a minor case, which involves a claim up to $10,000

=== Belgium ===
In Belgium, the justices of the peace (Dutch: vredegerecht, French: justice de paix, German: Friedensgericht) function as the small claims courts in the country's judicial system; they stand at the bottom of the Belgian judicial hierarchy and only handle civil cases. There is a justice of the peace in each judicial canton of Belgium, of which there are 187 in total as of 2017. The justices of the peace have original jurisdiction over cases in which the disputed amount does not exceed 5,000 euro (as of September 2018), except for the matters over which another court or tribunal has exclusive jurisdiction. In addition, the justices of the peace have original jurisdiction over a number of matters irrespective of the disputed amount, such as cases involving the renting or leasing of real estate, evictions, easement, land consolidation, consumer credit or unpaid utility bills. The justices of the peace also have original jurisdiction in certain aspects of family law, most notably legal guardianships for incapacitated seniors, and the involuntary commitment of the mentally ill to psychiatric facilities. The judgments made by the justices of the peace can, with some exceptions, be appealed to the tribunals of first instance.

=== Brazil ===
Small claim courts in Brazil were established by Law No. 9,099/1995 and Article One of such law states that they shall be organized by both Federal Judiciary and State Judiciary. Therefore, there are Federal Small Claim Courts (single noun Juizado Especial Federal), as well as Small Claim Courts that are part of a state's judiciary structure. The Small Claim Courts that belong to a State's Judiciary are subdivided into two types of courts: the Special Civil Court (Juizado Especial Cível, shortened as JEC) and the Special Criminal Court (Juizado Especial Criminal, shortened as Jecrim). Under Article Three of Law No. 9,099/1995, Civil Claims involving an amount up to 40 (forty) monthly minimal wages or R$24,880.00 (October 2012), which correspond to roughly US$12,440.00, may be filed before a Special Civil Court, as well as small claims involving landlords and some claims set by Article 275, II, of the Code of Civil Procedure. Special Criminal Courts, on the other hand, may process claims involving small criminal offences, which, under Article 60 of Law No. 9,099/1995 are those either set by the Contraventions Law (Decree No. 3,688/1941) or those where the penalty does not surpass 02 (two years). As per Article 54, there are no court fees for the Small Claim Courts. However, if an appeal is filed, court fees shall be applied.

=== Canada ===
All provinces have procedures for small claims in Canada. In general, there are two different models. In most provinces, including British Columbia, Alberta, and New Brunswick, small-claims courts operate independently of the superior courts. In other jurisdictions, the small-claims court is a branch or division of the superior court. In Ontario, the Small-Claims Court is a branch of the Superior Court of Justice, and in Manitoba, the Small-Claims Court is under the jurisdiction of the Court of the King's Bench.

Small-claims cases are heard by judges of the Provincial Court in British Columbia, Alberta, and Saskatchewan, by judges or deputy judges of the Superior Court of Justice in Ontario, and by Hearing Officers in Manitoba.

Small-claims courts are meant to provide an easier and less expensive path to resolve disputes than the higher courts. Small-claims court procedure is regulated both by provincial legislation and rules in most provinces. The small-claims procedure is simplified with no strict pleadings requirements and no formal discovery process, and parties' costs may be limited.

Monetary limits for small-claims courts in Canada vary by province:

Province	Limit (CA$)	Details
Alberta	$50,000	The Alberta Court of Justice hears civil claims up to $50,000. Any claims exceeding this amount must be heard in the Court of King's Bench of Alberta.
British Columbia	$35,000	In most cases, the Small Claims Court of the Provincial Court of British Columbia hears cases from $5,001 to $35,000. Since June 1, 2017, claims of less than $5,000 have been heard in the Civil Resolution Tribunal. Claims of over $35,000 are brought before the Supreme Court of British Columbia.
Manitoba	$10,000	The Small Claims Court of the Manitoba Court of King's Bench adjudicates claims up to $15,000.
New Brunswick	$20,000	The New Brunswick Small Claims Court hears claims up to a limit of $20,000. The limit was raised to its current amount on 1 April 2018, and was previously raised from $6,000 to $12,500 in 2013.
Newfoundland and Labrador	$25,000	The Provincial Court of Newfoundland and Labrador hears civil claims up to $25,000.
Nova Scotia	$25,000	The Nova Scotia Small Claims Court resolves claims to a maximum of $25,000.
Ontario	$50,000	The monetary limit to recover damages or personal property up to $50,000.
Quebec	$15,000	The Court of Quebec's Small Claims Division hears claims up to $15,000.
Saskatchewan	$30,000	Claims in the Small Claims Court of the Provincial Court of Saskatchewan cannot exceed $30,000 in value.

In general, disputes involving title to land, slander, libel, bankruptcy, false imprisonment, or malicious prosecution must be handled in a superior court and cannot be determined in small-claims courts.

=== European Union ===
A European Small Claims Procedure for cross-border claims under the Brussels regime as an alternative to national procedures was established on 1 January 2009, processing claims with values up to 2,000 EUR, increased to 5,000€ on 14 July 2017 and current as of 2025. Denmark is the only EU country that is not subject to this procedure.

=== Hong Kong ===
The Small Claims Tribunal (Chinese: 小額錢債審裁處) was established to provide a procedure for the speedy and inexpensive resolution of small claims. Situated at the West Kowloon Law Courts Building, the Small Claims Tribunal deals with monetary claims not exceeding HK$75,000. It has exclusive jurisdiction to deal with such claims. The Small Claims Tribunal does not have jurisdiction to deal with labour disputes, possession of land, alimony maintenance, libel/defamation claims and claims made by money lenders. As the Small Claims Tribunal does not have the power to grant injunctive relief, if a claimant seeks such relief, the case will be transferred to the District Court.

The Chief Magistrate (currently Victor So Wai-tak) is the Court Leader of the Small Claims Tribunal and is responsible for the administration of the Tribunal.

Cases in the Small Claims Tribunal are heard by Adjudicators (Chinese: 審裁官) appointed by the Chief Executive on the recommendation of the independent Judicial Officers Recommendation Commission (JORC). Cases may also be heard by Deputy Adjudicators (Chinese: 暫委審裁官) appointed on a temporary basis by the Chief Justice. A person who has practised for at least 5 years as a barrister, advocate, solicitor or judicial officer in Hong Kong or another common law jurisdiction is eligible to be appointed as an Adjudicator or Deputy Adjudicator. In practice, a number of Permanent Magistrates are assigned to sit as Adjudicators in the Small Claims Tribunal.

The fee to file a claim in the Small Claims Tribunal varies between HK$20 and HK$120 depending on the amount claimed.

When a claim is filed at the Tribunal Registry, the claimant will be given Form 3 which states the date of the call-over hearing (which must take place no later than 60 days after the claim is filed). At the call-over hearing, the Tribunal Officer will interview both parties, identify the issues in dispute and explore if a settlement can be reached. If the dispute cannot be settled, the Tribunal Officer will give directions for the filing of further documents (defence, counterclaim, reply, witness statements, other supporting documents etc.) and will adjourn the case until another date for a mention hearing.

At the mention hearing, the Adjudicator will check if the parties have complied with the previous directions and may also give further directions in preparation for trial. The Adjudicator may also actively explore with parties if they are willing to settle. If a settlement cannot be reached and the case is ready for trial, the Adjudicator will fix a trial date.

A party may apply to the Tribunal for adjournment of a hearing date. However, as the aim of the Small Claims Tribunal is to handle and dispose of disputes within a reasonable time, the Tribunal will generally only allow an application for adjournment if it is supported by a good reason and if it is a short adjournment. The Tribunal is expected to manage cases actively.

Hearings in the Small Claims Tribunal are conducted in an informal manner. Parties act in person and are not permitted to be legally represented. The rationale is that small claims should be resolved without incurring substantial expenses in retaining legal services and also that an unrepresented litigant should not fear the imbalance of power caused by a lawyer representing the other side. This ensures that there is a level playing field for all parties. However, a party is permitted to consult a lawyer for advice, including a lawyer who is present in the courtroom during the hearing as an observer, as long as the lawyer does not effectively conduct the case by giving directions to the party on steps to take during the hearing and questions to ask the witnesses. If a party is a corporation and one of its employees is a lawyer, that employee is allowed to represent the corporation in the proceedings in the Small Claims Tribunal. A party may also apply to the Small Claims Tribunal for leave for another person (who is not a lawyer) to act as their representative in conducting the case.

The claimant bears the burden of proof and has the primary responsibility to prepare and produce evidence in support of their case. However, the Adjudicator is under a statutory obligation to inquire into any matter considered relevant to a claim, whether or not it has been raised by a party. The Adjudicator may therefore invite the parties to comment on matters or direct them to produce evidence or documents relating to matters considered to be important. As the Adjudicator has an 'active inquisitorial role', the adjudicator should direct the parties to produce specific documents/evidence if such documents/evidence would have a bearing on the legal analysis of the dispute. The Adjudicator is not under a duty to summon witnesses to fill in the gaps in the evidence/case put forward by a party, but if a witness who may be important has not been called by a party and the Adjudicator has not explained to the parties the potential significance of that witness, the Adjudicator should not solely rely on the failure to call that witness to disbelieve a party's case. The Adjudicator may put questions to the parties and witnesses, and invite the parties to make submissions. However, the duty to inquire does not mean that the Adjudicator should take over the role of an adviser or advocate for a party, as the Adjudicator must remain neutral and impartial.

Rules of evidence do not apply in the Small Claims Tribunal, which may receive any evidence that it considers to be relevant. The Small Claims Tribunal will decide how to receive evidence based on considerations of proportionality, costs and common sense. A party may request discovery of documents from the other party if such documents exist, are/were in that party's possession, are relevant to the dispute and are necessary to obtain to deal fairly with the dispute between the parties. The Small Claims Tribunal can receive hearsay evidence, but it should consider why the witness concerned is not called to give oral evidence and whether the hearsay evidence is credible.

The Small Claims Tribunal has a discretion to award to the successful party any reasonable expenses necessarily incurred by and any loss of salary or wages suffered in attending the hearings. The costs order is not meant to be punitive.

The Adjudicator will give the decision orally or in writing at the end of the trial or as soon as possible thereafter. If the decision is delivered orally, the Adjudicator is required to reduce it to writing within 14 days. When reducing the oral decision in writing, the Adjudicator may expand on the oral decision by giving fuller written reasons for judgment as long as they are consistent with the original determination and factual findings. The Adjudicator is under a duty to analyse the material points in the evidence of the case and to give reasons as to why a particular conclusion or decision has been reached. The Adjudicator should explain their belief or disbelief in the evidence given by a witness. The Adjudicator should not give further written reasons to perfect or improve on the written reasons for decision which have already been given, in particular after one party has made an application to the Court of First Instance of the High Court for leave to appeal.

After the Adjudicator has delivered the decision/order, a party may request within 7 days by filing Form 8C and paying a fee of HK$61 that the adjudicator review the decision. When conducting the review of the decision/order, the Adjudicator may re-open and re-hear the claim wholly or in part, may call or hear fresh evidence, and may accordingly confirm, vary or reverse the decision/order. Parties wishing to adduce new evidence at the review stage are required to give cogent reasons explaining why such evidence had not been adduced at trial and show that such evidence is material/relevant to the dispute. The Adjudicator is required to give adequate reasons for the review decision.

Regardless of whether the Adjudicator has conducted a review of the decision/order, a party may appeal to the Court of First Instance of the High Court against a decision/order of the Small Claims Tribunal. However, it is necessary first to apply for leave to appeal from the Court of First Instance by filing Form 9 and paying a fee of HK$61 within 7 working days of the Small Claim Tribunal's decision/order by showing that it involves a point of law that is arguable or exceeded the Tribunal's jurisdiction. When applying for leave to appeal, a party may be legally represented in the Court of First Instance. The leave to appeal application will be heard before a High Court Judge at an ex parte oral hearing, which is attended only by the party applying for leave to appeal and not the other party/parties. Instead of an oral hearing, regardless of whether the applicant is legally represented or acting in person, the High Court Judge may direct that the ex parte application for leave to appeal be determined by way of paper disposal (in which case, the applicant files written submissions and the Judge hands down a decision at a later date). If the Court of First Instance refuses to grant leave to appeal, its decision is final and not susceptible to further appeal. The ex parte leave to appeal procedure means that the successful party in the Small Claims Tribunal only has to spend time and incur costs in resisting an appeal if the other party has been able to persuade the High Court Judge that he/she has an arguable ground of appeal. However, in some cases, the High Court Judge may direct that the leave to appeal hearing take place inter partes (in the presence of all the parties, not just the applicant).

If leave to appeal is granted, the appellant should file a Notice of Originating Motion and pay a fee of HK$1,045. All the parties (who may be legally represented) will then attend the appeal hearing before a High Court Judge. The Court of First Instance is not bound to allow the appeal merely because there was a misdirection or improper admission or rejection of evidence by the Small Claims Tribunal, unless the Court is of the view that substantial wrong or miscarriage was thereby occasioned. If the appeal is allowed, and if the appellant is legally represented while the respondent acts in person as he/she cannot afford legal representation, the Court has a discretion not to order that the unsuccessful respondent pay the costs incurred by the successful appellant in bringing the appeal if it would cause 'undue hardship' to the unsuccessful respondent and if the respondent had not put forward a claim or a defence in bad faith and had not misbehaved in conducting the proceedings in the Small Claims Tribunal. In principle, if the appeal is allowed, the Court of First Instance will remit the case back to the Small Claims Tribunal for a re-trial if it is necessary to make new/further factual findings, even if the amount claimed is small. However, the Court of First Instance may decline to order a re-trial even if it considers that the Small Claims Tribunal made an error of law if it would be disproportionate bearing in mind the amount claimed.

=== Ireland ===
The "small claims court" is an informal name for the District Court when operating under its Small Claims Procedure court rules. The Courts of Conscience of boroughs in the Republic of Ireland were superseded under the Courts of Justice Act, 1924 by the District Court, which operates throughout the state. Small claims cases were processed in the same manner as other summary judgments of the District Court until 1991, when a separate "small claims procedure" was first specified. The current District Court small claims procedure rules date from 2007, with amendments down to 2009. The European Small Claims Procedure is used where one party is in another EU member state.

=== Kenya ===
The Kenyan Small Claims Court was established in 2016 (formally launched on 26 April 2021 at Milimani Law Courts) under section 4 of the Small Claim Act No.2 of 2016. This court is a subordinate court as per Article 169(1) (d) of the Constitution of Kenya, 2010 and its geographical jurisdiction covers sub-counties or any other units of decentralization under the Constitution. Each Small Claims Court is presided over by an adjudicator appointed by the Judicial Service Commission. The Chief Justice can also designate any qualified person to act in as an adjudicator (section 6(1) and (2). To qualify under section 8 for appointment to be an adjudicator, a person must: a) be an advocate of the High Court of Kenya with three years of legal experience, or b) be trained as a paralegal at the Kenya School of Law. The court deals with civil cases provided for under section 12 which arise from: a) a contract for sale and supply of goods or services; (b) a contract relating to money held and received; (c) liability in tort in respect of loss or damage caused to any property or for the delivery or recovery of movable property; (d) compensation for personal injuries; and (e) set-off and counterclaim under any contract. Though the court’s pecuniary jurisdiction is limited to KES 1,000,000 (approximately US$10,000), Section 12(4) gives the Chief Justice the power to review that limit to any amount he thinks fit via a Gazette notice.

=== Nigeria ===
Small Claims court in Nigeria is similar to the ones in the United States and England. They are specially designated courts that hear and determine debt recovery cases of a small and liquidated debt. The small claims courts were introduced in Lagos Nigeria in April 2018 by the former Chief Judge of Lagos State Justice Opeyemi Oke . It is not clear if it was a world bank initiative or as a Lagos State Judiciary reform as the time of establishing the courts coincided with the PEBEC and world bank motive to improve the ease of doing business in Nigeria through seamless debt recovery court procedure. At the establishment ceremony, 15 magistrates courts across the five magisterial districts of Lagos were designated as small claims court. The five magisterial districts include Lagos Island, Ikeja, Yaba, Badagry and Ikorodu.

The Kano State Judiciary followed in Lagos' steps and established its Small Claims Court on 24 January 2019 having similar jurisdiction as the Lagos State Small Claims Court. Five Courts were designated as Small Claims Courts and are located in Gwammaja, Gyadi-Gyadi, Nomansland and Dawakin Tofa.

The small claims courts are presided over by magistrates who hear and determine cases on debt claims not exceeding five million Naira. It encompasses the routine collection of small debts, evictions and other disputes between landlords and tenants, as well as breach of contracts and simple torts. To institute a small claims matter, either the defendant or the claimant must be residing or doing business within the judicial division of the court.

=== New Zealand ===
In New Zealand the Disputes Tribunal addresses small claims below $60,000.

=== Singapore ===
Similar to the UK, small-claims can be handled in Singapore through State Courts of Singapore.

=== United Kingdom ===
The rules and procedures differ for the different countries of the United Kingdom. While Britain was a member of the European Union, the European Small Claims Procedure for cross-border claims also applied.

==== England and Wales ====
England and Wales does not have a separate small claims court. They are usually dealt with in the County Court after being allocated to the small claims track of the County Court system. Small claims take place under a modified set of rules. Low-value cases, including most non-personal-injury cases up to £10,000, are usually assigned to the small claims track, producing a small claims action in the County Court. These cases are heard by district judges under an informal procedure.

An important difference between small claims and other civil claims is that the parties are usually unable to recover their legal costs, regardless of who wins or loses. For this reason, most individuals and businesses involved in small claims deal with them without legal representation. The winning party will, however, generally be able to recover the following costs, fee and expenses from the losing party:

- fixed costs on commencement;
- court fees;
- expenses reasonably incurred by the winner and his/her witnesses in travelling to/from a hearing or in staying away from home for the purposes of attending a hearing;
- loss of earnings or loss of leave for the winner and his/her witnesses due to attending a hearing or staying away from home for the purpose of attending a hearing (capped at £95 per day for each person);
- expert fees (capped at £750 for each expert).

The separate small claims procedure was first introduced for claims up to £75 in 1973. This flowed from the statutory power of judges to order arbitration. The limit was raised to £1,000 in 1991, £3,000 in 1996, £5,000 in 1999 and £10,000 in 2013. The limit is only a guideline. The court may allocate a case to the small claim track where the claim is over the guideline if it is considered that the case is simple enough that it is an appropriate way of disposing of the matter. A Money Claim Online service is available for larger, but still simple, claims.

For small claims arising out of road traffic accidents, the cap has been £5000 since 2021. This element covers claims related to pain, suffering and loss of amenity, while property damage, loss of earnings and other financial losses are calculated separately, the whole being subject to the same £10,000 overall limit. For vulnerable road users, children, motorcyclists, pedestrians and cyclists, the limit for the injury component is £1,000.

==== Northern Ireland ====
The small claims process allows certain types of claims not exceeding £5,000 to be decided informally by the County Court.

==== Scotland ====
In Scotland small claims are handled by a process called simple procedure, subject to a limit of £5,000.

=== United States ===
The movement to establish small-claims courts typically began in the early 1960s, when justice of the peace courts were increasingly seen as obsolete, and officials felt it desirable to have such a court to allow people to represent themselves without legal counsel. In New York State, small claims courts were established in response to the 1958 findings of Governor Thomas E. Dewey's Tweed Commission on the reorganization of the state judiciary. Since then, the movement towards small-claims courts has led to their establishment in most U.S. states.

There is no equivalent to a small-claims court in the federal court. (Note that Congress has set the jurisdictional minimum for diversity jurisdiction cases at greater than $75,000). Magistrate judges are authorized to handle certain preliminary matters. Since the year 2010, the costs of filing fees have increased in almost every state court system. Filing fees typically range from US$15 to $150, depending on the claim amount. The alternative to small claims court include less expensive, faster online dispute resolution and settlement services, where potential litigants settle their disputes at a lower cost without requiring or involving any adjudicative process.

=== Greece ===
In Greece they are called "Ειρηνοδικεία" or "Πταισματοδικεία" (Justices of Peace or Small-Claims Courts). They have only one judge.

According to Article 14 of the Civil Code (Jurisdiction of Magistrates' Courts and Single-Member Courts of First Instance due to an amount), the following are under its jurisdiction:

1. All differences that can be valued in money and the value of their object does not exceed the amount of twenty thousand (20,000.00) euros.

All main or incidental differences from a lease agreement, as well as the differences of article 601 of the Civil Code, since in all these cases the agreed monthly rent does not exceed six hundred (600.00) euros

1. The differences between the owners of floors or apartments from the relationship of the apartment ownership and the differences between the managers of property by floors and the owners of floors and apartments concerning common costs, as long as the value of their object does not exceed the amount of twenty thousand (20,000) euros.

According to Article 15 of the Civil Code (Extraordinary jurisdiction of a magistrate's court without discrimination of value) the jurisdiction of the magistrate's courts is subject to the jurisdiction of the magistrate's courts regardless of the value of the subject of the dispute

1. The differences from purchased land concerning the delivery of the use of the lease or its performance for any reason,
2. Disputes concerning damage to trees, vines, fruits, seeds, roots and general plants, caused by illegal grazing of animals or in any other way,
3. The differences arising from the provisions of articles 1003 to 1009, 1018 to 1020 and 1023 to 1031 of the Civil Code, as well as those referring to damages caused by their violation,
4. Disputes concerning the determination of distances imposed by laws and regulations or local customs for planting trees or plantations or for erecting fences or digging ditches;
5. The disputes concerning the obstruction of the free use of roads and paths, as well as the damages caused by this obstruction,
6. Disputes concerning the use of running water or the prevention of its use,
7. The differences arising from the provisions of articles 834 to 839 of the Civil Code,
8. The disputes concerning claims of the persons referred to in articles 834 and 839 of the Civil Code or their universal successors, against their clients or their universal successors,
9. The differences from a contract of carriage of persons by any means, for the claims that the carriers or agents or their universal successors have from it;
10. The disputes concerning the claims of the associations and cooperatives against their members or their universal successors, for the contribution owed to them, as well as the disputes concerning the claims that the members or the universal successors have against the associations and cooperatives them for monetary or other benefits,

the disputes concerning the demands of lawyers or their universal successors for their fees and expenses, if it concerns their services in trials in the Magistrates' Court or in the Criminal Court,

1. Disputes relating to the rights or compensation or costs of witnesses examined in any court or to arbitrators, and those relating to the rights or compensation or costs of interpreters, bailiffs and bailiffs, however appointed, and registrars successors of all these,
2. The differences arising from the sale of animals, due to actual defects or lack of agreed properties.

Magistrates' courts are also responsible for issuing payment orders and rent payment orders for a claim within their jurisdiction, while from 1 March 2013 they are now responsible for the publication of wills, the issuance of inheritance certificates as well as for the registration or removal of a mortgage pre-notification.

== Classes ==
Some jurisdictions offer classes in small-claims court procedures. As such courts are open to the public, attendance at a few sessions may be useful to a person involved in a case, whether as plaintiff or defendant.

== In popular culture ==
Several small-claims proceedings have appeared on television in court shows. However, the settings in these programs are not truly courts of law: even though they attempt to give off the appearance as such, they are merely forms of arbitration. Such shows include The People's Court, Judge Judy, Judge Joe Brown, Judge Mathis, etc., all of which feature retired judges as the arbitrator.

== See also ==
- Allocation questionnaire – form used in English civil courts to decide whether to allocate a case to the small-claims track
- Amount in controversy
- De minimis
