= Administrative court =

Specialized court dealing with exercise of public power disputes

An administrative court is a type of specialized court on administrative law, particularly disputes concerning the exercise of public power. Their role is to ascertain that official acts are consistent with the law. Such courts are usually considered separate from ordinary courts.

The administrative acts are recognized from the hallmark that they become binding without the consent of the other involved parties. The contracts between authorities and legal persons governed by private law fall usually to the jurisdiction of the general court system. Official decisions contested in administrative courts include:

- taxation
- dispensation of monetary benefits
- environmental licenses
- building inspection
- child custody
- involuntary commitment
- immigration decisions
- summary public payments (other than fines imposed by general courts)

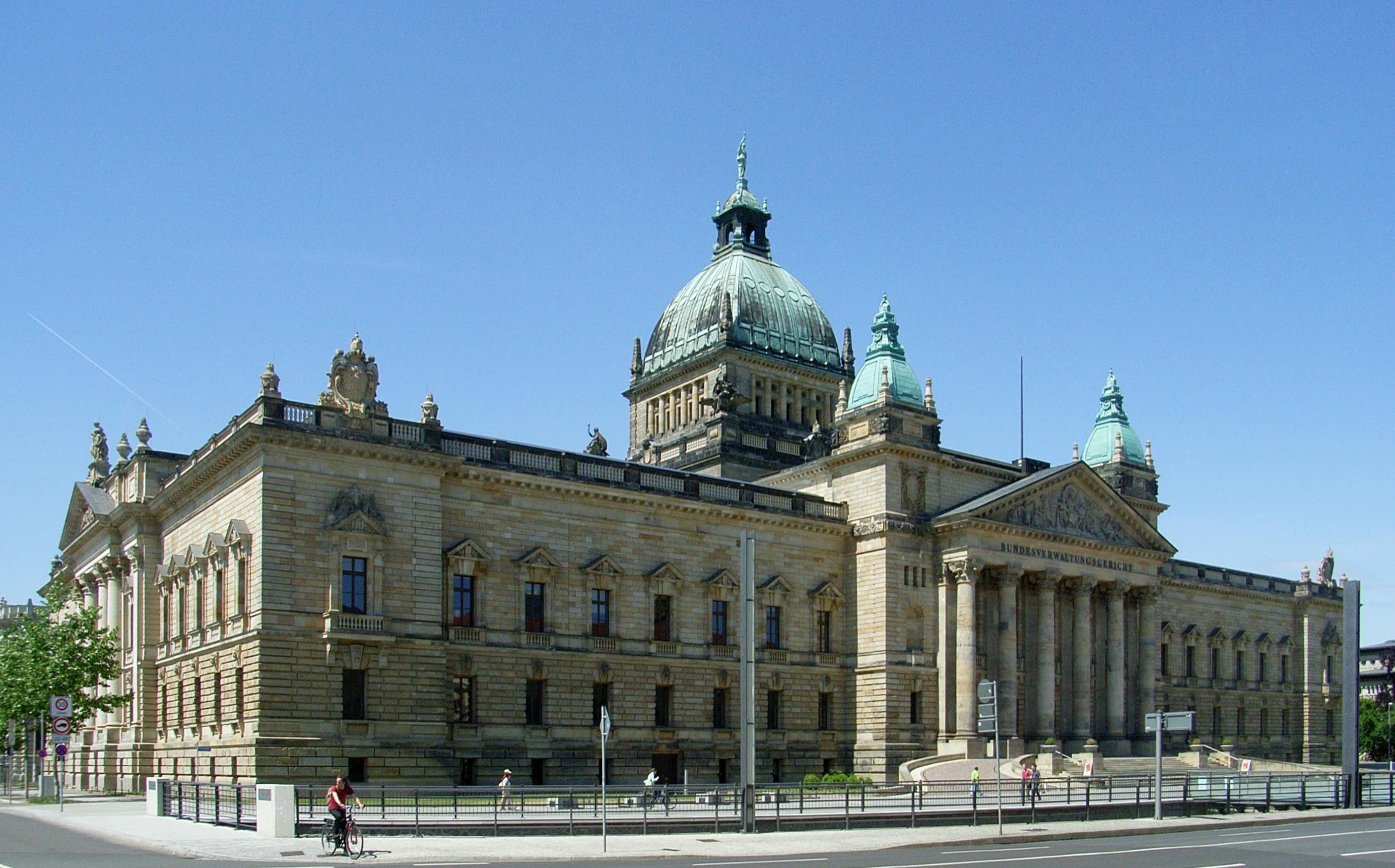
The Federal Administrative Court of Germany in Leipzig is the highest administrative court in Germany.

In several countries, in addition to general courts, there is a separate system of administrative courts, where the general and administrative systems do not have jurisdiction over each other. Accordingly, there is a local administrative court of first instance, possibly an appeals court and a Supreme Administrative Court separate from the general Supreme Court.

The parallel system is found in countries like Austria, Egypt, Greece, Germany, France, Italy, some of the Nordic countries, Portugal, Taiwan and others. In France, Greece, Portugal and Sweden, the system has three levels like the general system, with local courts, appeal courts and a Supreme Administrative Court. In Finland, Italy, Poland and Taiwan, the system has two levels, where the court of first instance is a regional court. In Germany, the system is more complicated, and courts are more specialized.

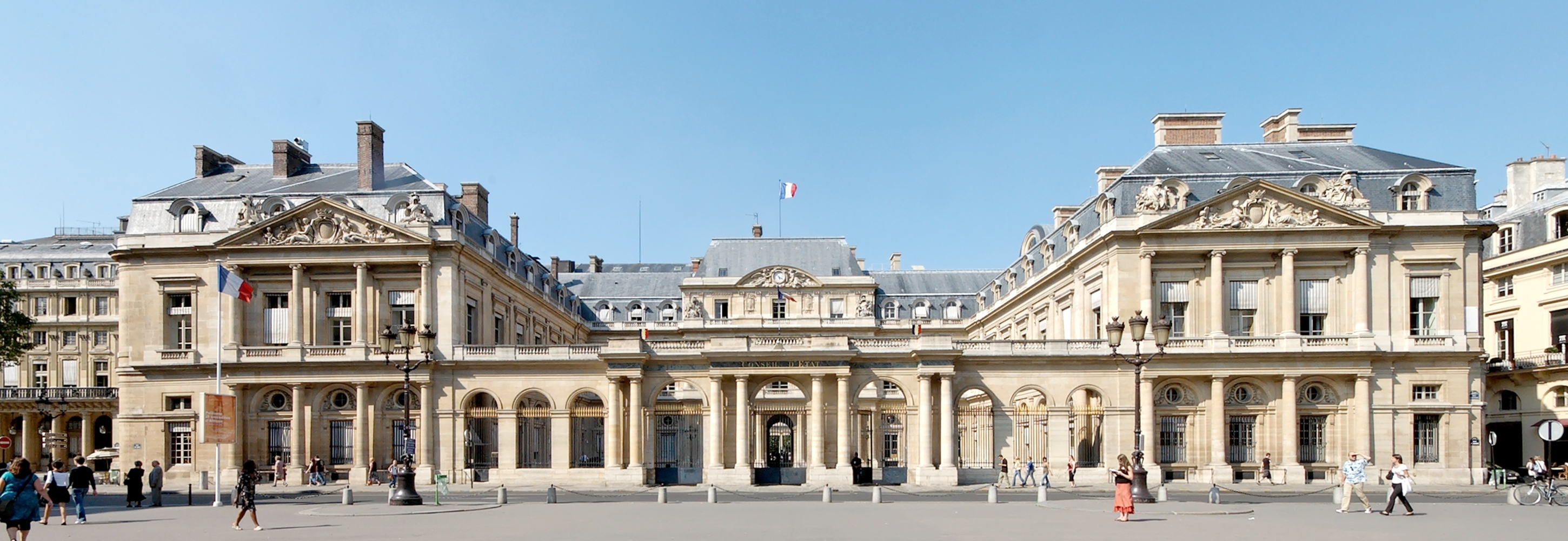
The Conseil d'Etat in Paris is the supreme administrative court in France.

In Sweden and Finland, legality of decisions of both state agencies and municipal authorities can be appealed to the administrative courts. In accordance with the principle of the legal autonomy of municipalities, administrative courts can (if not stipulated otherwise) only review and rule on the formal legality of the decision, not its content. In the case of state agencies, administrative courts may rule on the actual content of the decision.

The United States does not have a separate system of administrative courts in the judicial branch. Instead, administrative law judges (ALJs) preside over tribunals within executive branch agencies. In American jurisprudence, ALJs are always regarded as part of the executive branch, despite their quasi-judicial adjudicative role, because of the strict separation of powers imposed by the United States Constitution. Decisions of ALJs can be appealed to courts in the judicial branch. Some states have designated specific courts to have exclusive jurisdiction over administrative decisions. For example, the Commonwealth Court of Pennsylvania and the Texas Fifteenth Court of Appeals have exclusive appellate jurisdiction over appeals of administrative decisions in their respective states.

Notably, in 1952, the Communist East German government abolished the administrative courts as "bourgeois". This limited the citizens' ability to contest official decisions. In 1989, re-establishment of the system began in the DDR, but the German reunification made this initiative obsolete.

== List ==
=== Africa ===
- African Development Bank Administrative Tribunal
- Council of State (Democratic Republic of the Congo)
- Southern African Development Community Administrative Tribunal (SADCAT)

=== Asia ===
- Administrative Court of Appeal of Armenia
- Administrative-economic courts (Azerbaijan)
- Tribunals in India
- Administrative courts in Mongolia
- Tribunals in Sri Lanka
- Administrative Court of Thailand

=== North America ===
- Canadian tribunals
- Mexico
  - Federal Tribunal of Administrative Justice
    - Superior Chamber
    - Regional Chambers
    - Environmental and Regulatory Chamber
  - State administrative tribunals

==== United States ====
- Federal administrative courts
  - Article I tribunals, most of which are administrative courts
  - See Administrative law judge#List of U.S. federal agencies with ALJs
- State administrative courts
  - See List of state departments and agencies with Administrative Law Judges
  - California
    - California Alcoholic Beverage Control Appeals Board
    - State Bar Court of California
    - California Unemployment Insurance Appeals Board
    - Local
      - San Francisco Board of Appeals
      - County Assessment Appeals Boards
  - Department of Administrative Hearings in Chicago, Illinois
  - Commonwealth Court of Pennsylvania
  - Maryland Office of Administrative Hearings
  - Massachusetts Appellate Tax Board
  - New Jersey Office of Administrative Law
  - New York (state)
    - New York City
      - New York City Loft Board
      - New York City Office of Administrative Trials and Hearings
      - New York City Tax Appeals Tribunal
      - Department of Finance Adjudication Division
      - Department of Education Office of Impartial Hearings
      - New York City Housing Authority Office of Impartial Hearings
    - Traffic Violations Bureau
  - Texas State Office of Administrative Hearings

=== South America ===
- Council of State (Colombia)

=== Europe ===
- Administrative courts in Albania
- Administrative Court of Austria
- Council of State (Belgium)
- Supreme Administrative Court of Bulgaria
- Supreme Administrative Court of the Czech Republic
- Administrative courts in Finland
- Germany
  - Federal Administrative Court
  - Federal Social Court
  - Fiscal Court and Federal Fiscal Court
- Administrative courts in Greece
- Council of State (Italy)
- Supreme Administrative Court of Lithuania
- Poland
  - Supreme Administrative Court of the Republic of Poland
  - Voivodeship Administrative Court
- Council of State (Netherlands)
- Spain
  - Audiencia Nacional Administrative Chamber
  - Central Administrative Courts (Spain)
- Administrative courts in Sweden
- United Kingdom
  - The Administrative Court is a specialist court of the King's Bench Division of the High Court of Justice in England and Wales
  - Tribunals in the United Kingdom

=== Oceania ===
- Australia
  - Australian federal tribunals
  - ACT Civil and Administrative Tribunal
  - New South Wales tribunals
  - Queensland Industrial Relations Commission
  - Queensland Civil and Administrative Tribunal
  - South Australian tribunals
  - Tasmanian tribunals
  - Victorian Civil and Administrative Tribunal
  - Western Australian tribunals
- New Zealand
  - Tenancy Tribunal
  - Motor Vehicle Disputes Tribunal
  - Alcohol Regulatory & Licensing Authority
  - Human Rights Review Tribunal
  - Real Estate Agents Tribunal
  - Abortion Supervisory Committee
  - Accident Compensation Appeal Authority
  - Canterbury Earthquakes Insurance Tribunal
  - Copyright Tribunal
  - Customs Appeal Authority
  - Immigration & Protection Tribunal
  - Immigration Advisers Complaints & Disciplinary Tribunal
  - Land Valuation Tribunal
  - Birdlings Flat Land Title Commissioner
  - Lawyers & Conveyancers Disciplinary Tribunal
  - Legal Aid Tribunal
  - Social Security Appeal Authority
  - Student Allowance Appeal Authority
  - Taxation and Charities Review Authority
  - Trans-Tasman Occupations Tribunal
  - Weathertight Homes Tribunal
  - Waitangi Tribunal
