= European small claims procedure =

The European Small Claims Procedure (ESCP) is a small claims procedure which took effect on 1 January 2009 across the European Union, except Denmark, for dealing with cross-border claims under the Brussels Regime up to a value of €5,000.

Small claims procedures provide a middle ground between formal litigation and alternative dispute resolution, where disputes involving small value claims can be resolved in courts faster, cheaply, and less formally. The main limitation of small claims procedures is that they are restricted to particular jurisdictions. To overcome this limitation the European Commission proposed a regulation for a European Small Claims Procedure (ESCP), which was adopted by the European Parliament and the European Council on 11 July 2007.

The ESCP is predominantly a written procedure that deals with claims under €5,000 arising in cross-border disputes. Its main advantage is that it provides for the enforcement of decisions in any of the member states without the present need to go through the formal mutual recognition of judgements (exequatur).

== Ease of use ==
The European Union has highlighted, following the interviews and questionnaires submitted to the European citizen (legal practitioners, consumers, small&medium-sized entrepreneurs), that the procedure was difficult to understand and that it was not widely used. Therefore, in September 2018 started the Project SCAN. SCAN - Small Claims Analysis Net - is a consortium of nine partners under the guidance of UNINA University of Naples Federico II - Law School, and coordinated by Professor Francesco Romeo. SCAN aims to make easier to understand the European Small Claims Procedure for the European citizens through its website and an ESCP Platform.

== See also ==
- European Online Dispute Resolution Platform
