= Environment, Resources and Development Court =

Specialist court in South Australia

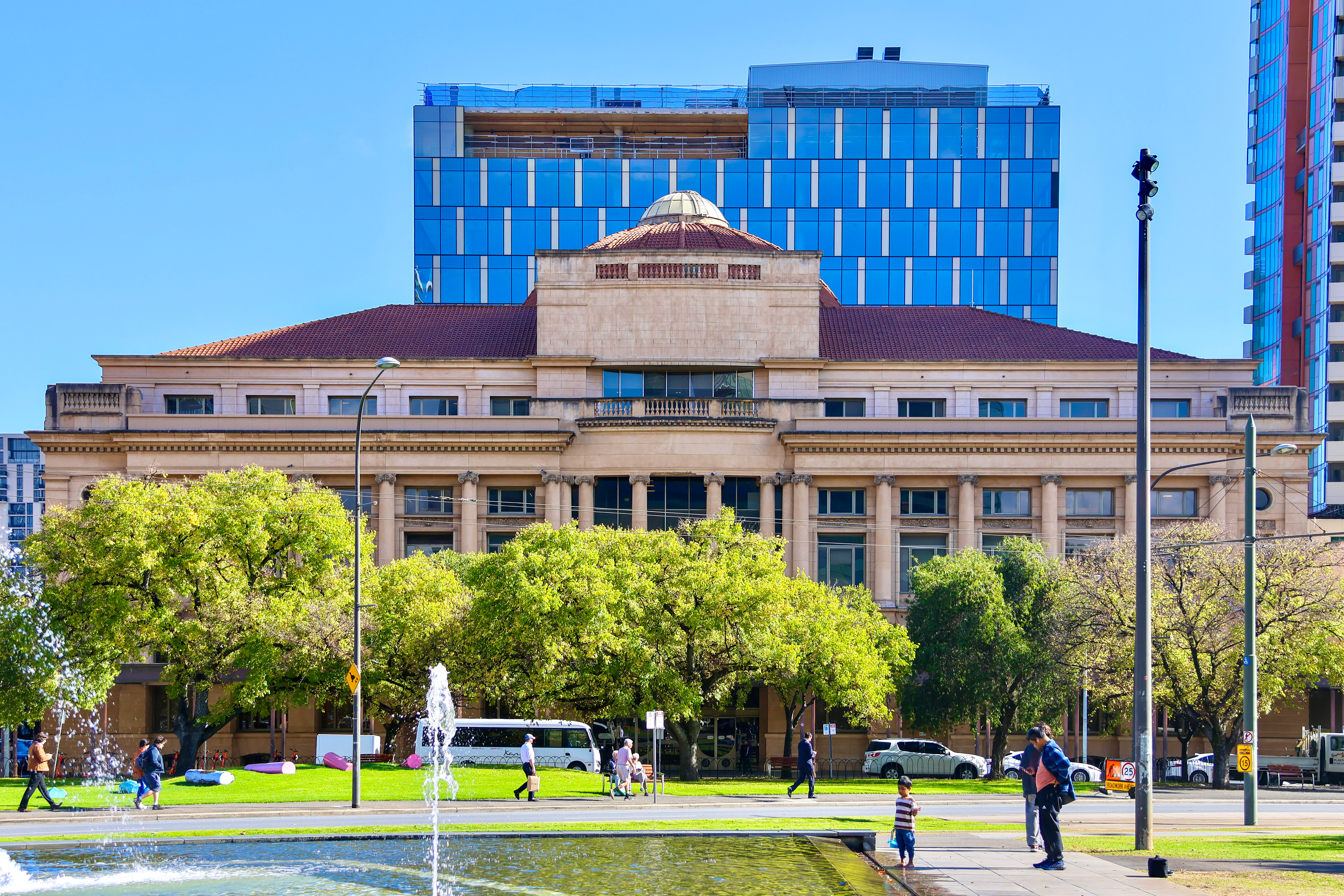
- The Sir Samuel Way Building, the main seat of the ERD Court, viewed from Victoria Square, Adelaide
- Established: 1993
- Jurisdiction: South Australia
- Location: Adelaide
- Website: www.courts.sa.gov.au/our-judiciary/

Senior Judge
- Currently: Michael Durrant
- Since: 15 December 2022

The Environment, Resources and Development Court (ERD Court) is a specialist court in the Australian state of South Australia. It deals with disputes and enforcement of laws relating to the development and management of land, the natural and built environment and natural resources.

The ERD Court was established by the Environment, Resources and Development Court Act 1993. It has jurisdiction under legislation relating to the natural and built environment, heritage, water, native title and mining.

The senior judge and other judges of the ERD Court are judges in the District Court of South Australia. Masters of the Court are also designated from the District Court. The Court also has magistrates (drawn from the Magistrates Court of South Australia) and commissioners who are not lawyers, but are experts in fields relevant to the Court.

Since 15 December 2022, Judge Michael Durrant (appointed to the Court on 28 February 2019) has held the position of senior judge of the Court.
