= Disputes Tribunal =

Small claims court in New Zealand

The Disputes Tribunal is a small claims court in New Zealand. It can hear certain civil claims up to a disputed sum of $30,000. Many claims are for relatively small amounts. The Tribunal has offices and holds hearings at locations in major towns and cities throughout the country.

The Tribunal is administered under the Disputes Tribunal Act 1988.

== See also ==
- NZI Insurance New Zealand Ltd v Auckland District Court
