= NZI Insurance New Zealand Ltd v Auckland District Court =

- Court: High Court of New Zealand
- Full case name: NZI Insurance New Zealand Limited v Auckland District Court
- Decided: 1993
- Citation: [1993] 3 NZLR 453

Court membership
- Judge sitting: Thorp J

Keywords
- Disputes Tribunal

NZI Insurance New Zealand Ltd v Auckland District Court [1993] 3 NZLR 453, is a New Zealand case that addresses cases decided in the disputes tribunals, and whether the resulting decisions are later appealable due to the referee making an error of law.

== Background ==
Mr Battenburg arranged for insurance on his car via an insurance broker with NZI Insurance. But the broker soon went into liquidation without passing on the first premium, and as a result, NZI wrote to him informing him that they were cancelling his car insurance due to non-payment.

To keep his car insured, Battenburg paid NZI directly for this missing payment, and filed a claim with the Disputes Tribunal against NZI to be reimbursed for the insurance payment made through the broker. And later won. NZI unhappy with the decision, as they believed under the law the insurance broker was an agent of Battenburg and not NZI, appealed to the District Court, claiming the referee had made an "error of law" in making the ruling, adding that section 18(6) of the Disputes Tribunal Act [1988] states that the referee must have "regard to the law".

NZI lost again, and filed for a judicial review in the High Court.

== Decision ==
The High Court dismissed the appeal, as the Disputes Tribunal is composed of laymen (and not solicitors), therefore it is not necessary for a referee to "know all the relevant law". Furthermore, section 18(6) also states that a referee "shall not be bound to give effect to strict legal rights or obligations or to legal forms or technicalities".

The end effect is that Dispute Tribunal rulings are not appealable due to any alleged error of law, as well as that the referee can instead make a ruling based on what they think is "fair and just".
