= South Australian Employment Court =

The South Australian Employment Tribunal, which also sits as the South Australian Employment Court (formerly the Industrial Relations Court of South Australia and Industrial Relations Commission of South Australia) is a South Australian tribunal empowered to adjudicate on rights and liabilities arising out of employment. It has existed in some form or another since 1912, under various names.

The Employment Court is a court of record established under the South Australian Employment Tribunal Act 2014.

== History ==
In 1906, the Factories Amendment Act created a Court of Industrial Appeals, consisting of a single Supreme Court judge who heard mainly appeals from determinations of wage boards. That Court was abolished in 1912 and replaced with the Industrial Court of South Australia under the Industrial Arbitration Act 1912. The Court's existence was continued by the Industrial Code 1920, the Industrial Code 1967, and then later by the Industrial Conciliation and Arbitration Act 1972. In 1994, the Court's name changed to the Industrial Relations Court under the Industrial and Employee Relations Act 1994. That act was subsequently renamed the Fair Work Act 1994. In 2017, the Industrial Relations Court of South Australia was dissolved by an amendment to the Fair Work Act 1994, and it was immediately replaced by the present Court, which is constituted under the South Australian Employment Tribunal Act 2014.

== Judiciary and appointment ==
The Court's judiciary consists of the President, who is a Justice, and Deputy Presidents who are either Judges or Magistrates.

The President and other Judges of the Court may be appointed by the Governor as Judges of the District Court of South Australia and assigned by proclamation to the Court as Presidential members. Judges of the Court hold office on the same terms as District Court Judges: they must retire at the age of 70 and can only be removed by an address by both houses of the South Australian Parliament.

Magistrates are appointed under the Magistrates Act 1983 and assigned by proclamation to be a Deputy President of the Court. Magistrates hold office to the age of 70.

== Jurisdiction ==
The Court has both civil and criminal jurisdiction in respect of a wide range of disputes arising out of employment law. Its jurisdiction includes the interpretation of industrial awards and the determination of questions reserved by the South Australian Employment Tribunal and the validity of determinations by the Tribunal.

In most cases the Court is constituted by a single judge or magistrate. The Court sits as a Full Court (usually constituted by a bench of three judges) to hear appeals from the decisions of a single judge or magistrate of the Court and to consider questions of law reserved.

An appeal is available from decisions of the Full Court of the Court to the Supreme Court of South Australia, with permission from the Supreme Court.

== South Australian Employment Tribunal ==
The South Australian Employment Tribunal is a body that complements the functions of the Court. Most members of the Court are also members of the Tribunal. The Tribunal deals with arbitration matters which cannot be dealt with by a Court, in accordance with the Boilermakers' doctrine.

The SAET overseas landmark cases like the Shahin Enterprises case where OTR was forced to repay $65,000 after not providing toilet breaks to staff.

== Current presidential members ==
(Date of appointment appears in brackets)

=== President ===
Justice Steven Dolphin (1 February 2015; President from 7 November 2017)

=== Judges (and Deputy Presidents) ===
Judge Mark Calligeros (1 February 2015)

Judge Margaret Kelly (19 December 2017)

Judge Anthony Rossi (13 May 2019)

Judge Miles Crawley (7 December 2020)

Judge Jodie Carrel (1 November 2025)

=== Magistrates (and Deputy Presidents) ===
Stephen Lieschke (17 October 2005)

Katherine Eaton (1 December 2022)

Larissa Harrison (6 August 2026)
