= Drug courts in Australia =

Drug courts have been established in New South Wales, Queensland, South Australia, Victoria, and Western Australia. People appearing in Australian drug courts often fall outside the parameters for other pre-court diversion programs.

== Drug courts by state ==
=== New South Wales ===
Established pursuant to the Drug Court Act 1998 (NSW), the Drug Court of New South Wales exercises both local and district court jurisdiction. Eligible defendants are referred from other courts within the catchment area. Acceptance into the program results in a custodial remand for detoxification and assessment. This takes up to two weeks and each participant leaves with an individual treatment plan. After the assessment the defendant is required to plead guilty and is given a suspended sentence. Successful completion of the three phase treatment program can take up to 12 months. The court can impose a series of sanctions or award privileges during that time. If the program is not completed successfully the participant returns to court and may be re-sentenced. Magistrates can place defendants whose offending may not be as significant as those entering the Drug Court and are likely to be granted bail, into the Magistrates Early Referral into Treatment (MERIT) program. MERIT involves completing compulsory treatment as a condition of bail. In 2000, New South Wales commenced operation of a Youth Drug and Alcohol Court, which functions under the control of the Children's Court. It aims to provide an integrated case management approach to prevent re-offending and includes treatment and assistance with health and education needs.

=== Queensland ===
Established pursuant to the Drug Rehabilitation (Court Diversion) Act 2000 (QLD) as a pilot project, five drug courts have been established in Queensland. The Act and regulations limit the number of people who can enter the system from each court each year. In August 2005, it was announced that the drug courts would be made permanent. To be eligible, defendants must be adults, dependent on illicit drugs and this dependency must be a contributing factor to their offending. They must be likely to be sentenced to prison, not subject to a pending violent or sexual offence charge, live within the prescribed areas and plead guilty. In addition participants are admitted into the program if they have issues such as: mental illness, intellectual disability, cognitive impairment, and homelessness or the risk of being homeless. Participants receive an intensive drug treatment order which includes treatment, drug testing and court supervision. These orders generally run for up to 18 months. During that time the participant may receive added privileges or sanctions. Successful completion is taken into account when sentencing is conducted at the end of the order.

=== South Australia ===
South Australia's Drug Court operates in the Adelaide Magistrates' Court. Participants must live within the Adelaide metropolitan area, be over 18 years of age, plead guilty to the most serious and bulk of offences and be dependent on illicit drugs. The participants do not have to be charged with a drug offence but their offending must have resulted from their drug addiction. Those accepted into the program are given an individual treatment regime, which can include electronically monitored home detention bail, urinalysis, treatment and vocational training. Successful completion of the program will be taken into consideration at sentencing.

=== Victoria ===
The Victorian Drug Court is located in Dandenong and services defendants within a specific geographical catchment area. Only adult defendants who are addicted to illicit drugs, likely to be imprisoned for a drug related offence and prepared to plead guilty are eligible. If they are willing to enter the program, they are placed on a Drug Treatment Order. These orders have two components; a custodial sentence of not more than two years and a treatment and supervision component. Failure to compete the order renders the participant liable for re-sentencing. Other Victorian courts can place defendants within the Court Referral and Evaluation for Drug Intervention and Treatment (CREDIT) program. The 12-week program provides assessment, treatment and support for defendants on bail.

=== Western Australia ===
In Western Australia, the drug court operates in the Perth Magistrates' Court and the Perth Children's Court. The Magistrates' Court drug court is supported by the Magistrates' Court Act 2004 (WA), which enables the Chief Magistrate to establish divisions within the court to deal with specific classes of cases or offenders, such as drug cases or family violence cases. Following a plea of guilty, defendants are placed within one of three regimes depending on their level of previous offending and the type of drug involved. The brief intervention regime is a pre-sentence option for second or third time cannabis offenders and involves three sessions of drug education. Supervised treatment intervention is for mid-range offenders who are required to undertake case managed treatment before sentencing. The drug court regime consists of more intensive treatment and judicial case management. Additionally, a drug court style program operates in Geraldton in the form the Geraldton Alternative Sentencing Regime (GASR). The GASR has a broader remit that includes alcohol and solvent abuse cases, domestic violence and other offending behaviours. It does not replace other sentencing options but offers alternative pathways for selected offenders: the Court Supervision Regime which involves the offender being managed by a court management team for a period of four to six months whilst participating in rehabilitation programs; and the Brief Intervention Regime which also includes offender participation in rehabilitation programs but without the supervision of the court management team.

== See also ==
- Crime in Australia
- Illicit drug use in Australia
