= List of Northern Territory courts and tribunals =

There are two levels of Court in the Northern Territory: the Local Court and the Supreme Court. Both levels handle civil and criminal matters. For criminal matters, the nature and severity of the offence will determine which Court hears your case.
