= Children's Court of Western Australia =

State court in Western Australia

Coordinates: 31°57′05″S 115°51′53″E

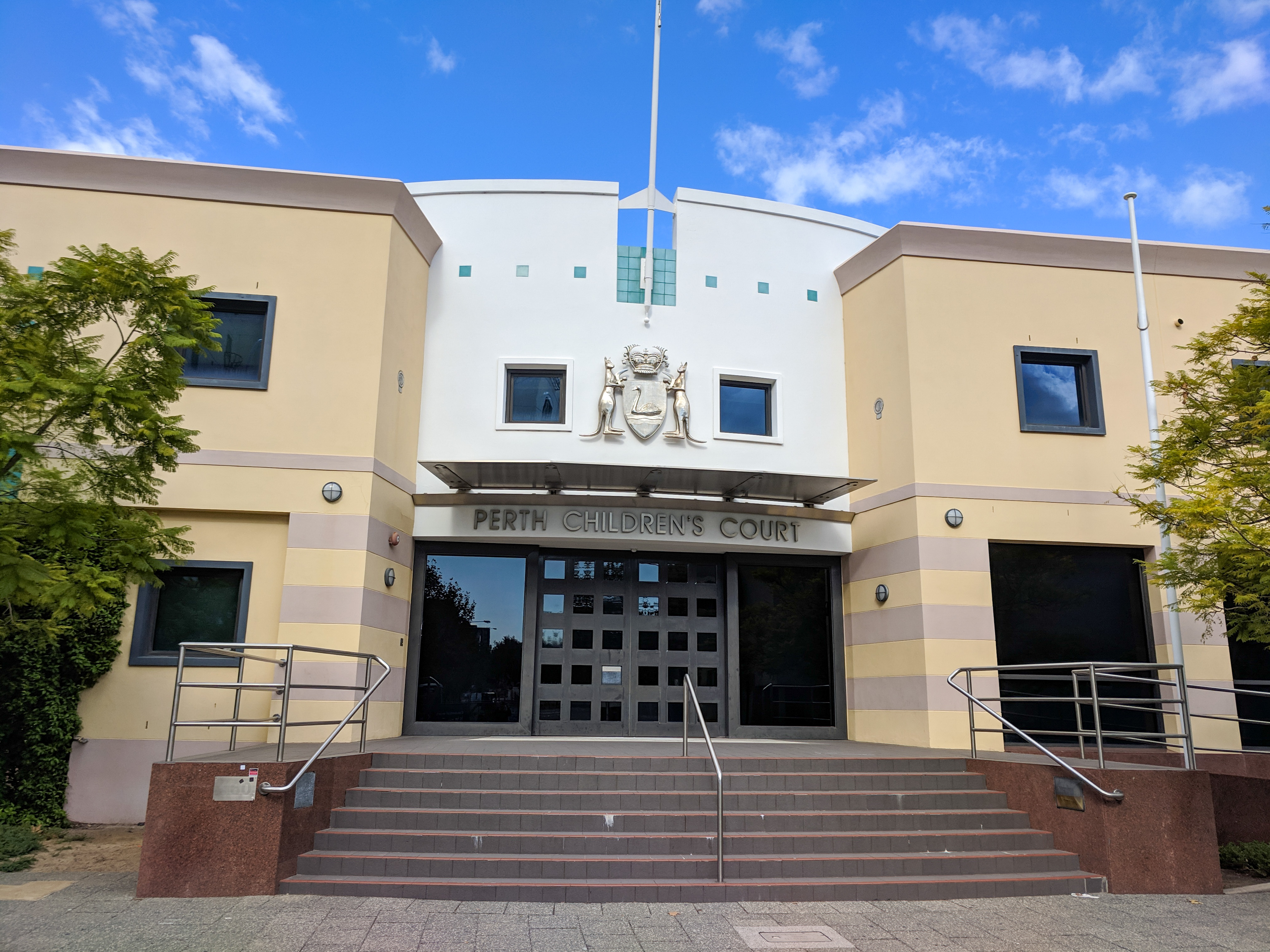
Perth Children's Court

The Children's Court of Western Australia is a state court that hears cases involving children (aged 10 to 17 years) accused of committing criminal offences. It was originally called the Perth Children's Court when it was created in 1907 by the State Children's Act, but became known as the Children's Court of Western Australia when the Children's Court of Western Australia Act 1988 was passed.

In 1988, Sue Gordon was appointed as magistrate to the Perth Children's Court, making her the first Indigenous Australian magistrate in Western Australia.

The current purpose-built Court building was constructed by Cooper & Oxley and officially opened on 9 June 1992. Previously the Court was housed in St George's Hall in Hay Street until it was re-located in 1977 to the former East Perth Primary School buildings. The Court is currently located at 160 Pier Street, Perth, although children's court cases are heard in other courthouses throughout the state.
