= List of Tasmanian courts and tribunals =

The following is a list of courts and tribunals in Tasmania:

== List of boards, commissions, courts, and tribunals ==
=== Sitting boards, commissions, courts, and tribunals ===
The list of sitting boards and commissions is sourced from the Service Tasmania Online portal.

==== Sitting boards and councils ====
- Agricultural, Silvicultural and Veterinary Chemicals Council
- Guardianship and Administration Board
- Legal Profession Board of Tasmania
- Local Government Board
- Motor Accidents Insurance Board
- National Parks and Wildlife Advisory Council
- Nomenclature Board
- Parole Board
- Poppy Advisory and Control Board
- Road Safety Advisory Council
- Schools Registration Board
- State Fire Management Council of Tasmania
- Tasmanian Development Board
- Tasmanian Heritage Council
- Teachers Registration Board
- Veterinary Board of Tasmania
- Workcover Tasmania

==== Sitting authorities ====
- Environment Protection Authority
- Forest Practices Authority
- Marine and Safety Tasmania
- Port Arthur Historic Site
- Wellington Park Management Trust

==== Sitting courts ====
- Magistrates Court of Tasmania
  - Coroners Court of Tasmania
- Supreme Court of Tasmania

==== Sitting tribunals ====
The following are sourced from the Tasmanian Department of Justice website.

- Anti-Discrimination Tribunal*
- Asbestos Compensation Tribunal*
- Forest Practices Tribunal*
- Guardianship and Administration Board*
- Health Practitioners Tribunal*
- Mental Health Tribunal*
- Mining Tribunal
- Motor Accidents Compensation Tribunal*
- Resource Management and Planning Appeal Tribunal*
- Workers Rehabilitation and Compensation Tribunal*

Any tribunals with '*' act as branches under TASCAT (Tasmanian Civil and Administrative Tribunal)

== See also ==
- Australian court hierarchy
- Government of Tasmania
