= Northern Territory Civil and Administrative Tribunal =

The Northern Territory Civil and Administrative Tribunal (NTCAT) is a tribunal in the Northern Territory. It was established by the Northern Territory Civil and Administrative Tribunal Act 2014.
