= South Australian Civil and Administrative Tribunal =

The South Australian Civil and Administrative Tribunal (SACAT) is an administrative law tribunal established in 2015. The Tribunal was created by the South Australian Civil and Administrative Tribunal Act 2013.
