= District Court of South Australia =

Principal South Australian court

- Coat of arms of South Australia

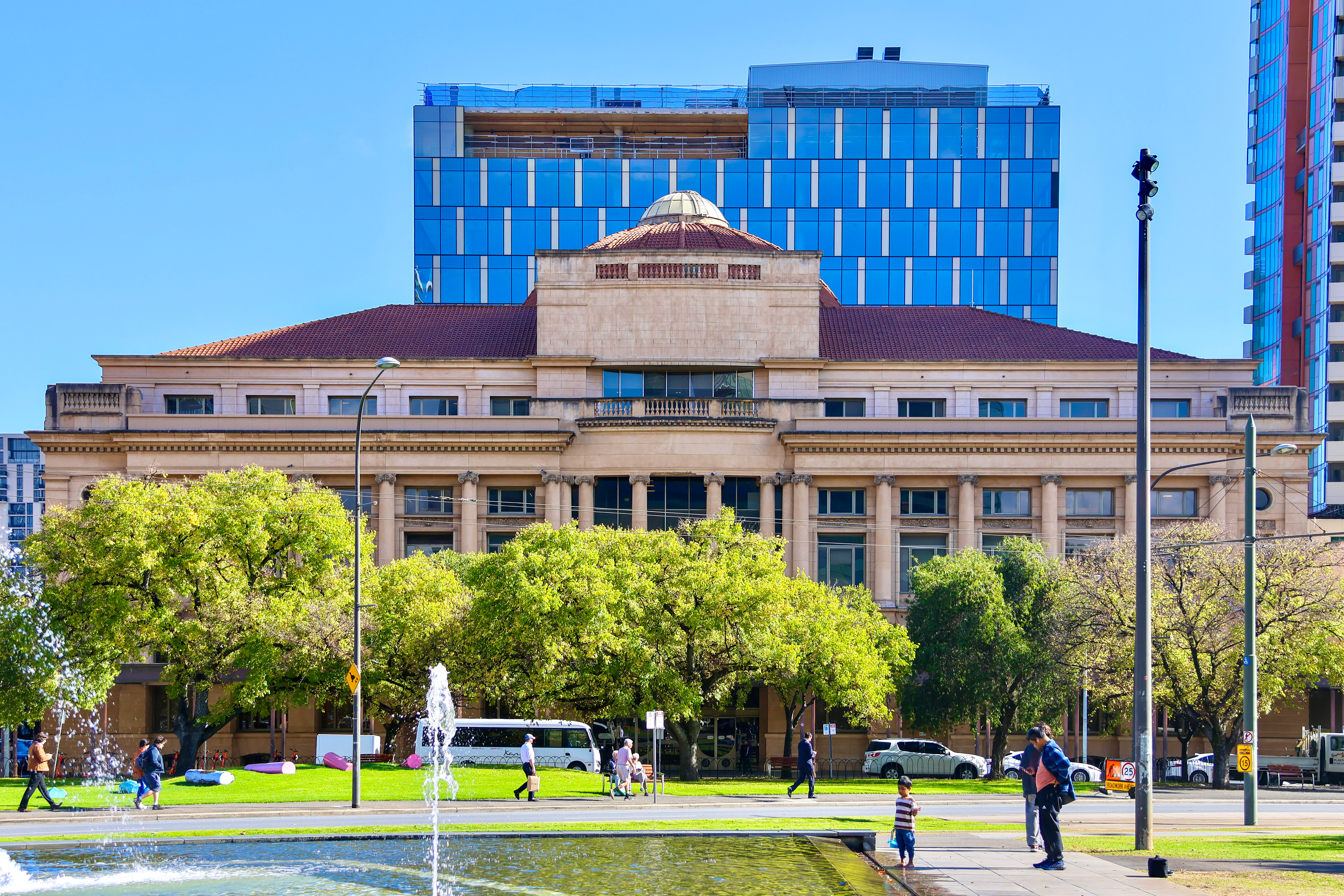
- The Sir Samuel Way Building, the main seat of the District Court of South Australia
- Interactive map of District Court of South Australia
- 34.929777°S 138.598805°E
- Established: 1969
- Jurisdiction: South Australia
- Location: Adelaide
- Coordinates: 34.929777°S 138.598805°E
- Composition method: Vice-regal appointment upon nomination by the Premier following the advice of the Attorney General and Executive Council of South Australia
- Authorised by: Parliament of South Australia via the: District Court Act 1991 (SA)
- Appeals to: Supreme Court of South Australia
- Judge term length: Mandatory retirement by age of 70
- Website: District Court information section and location link

Chief Judge of the District Court
- Currently: Michael Evans
- Since: 20 Dec 2016

The District Court of South Australia is South Australia's principal trial court. It was established as a court of record by the District Court Act 1991. Prior to that the Court had existed since 1969 under the Local and District Criminal Courts Act 1926.

== Jurisdiction and appointment of judges ==
Judges of the District Court are appointed by the Governor of South Australia on the advice of the Executive Council. Once appointed, they cannot be removed from office except by an address from both houses of the South Australian Parliament. They must retire when they reach the age of 70. Judges of the Employment Court, the Environment, Resources and Development Court, the Licensing Court and the Youth Court, as well as Masters of the Supreme Court, also formally hold office as District Court Judges. They are not listed on this page (except where they have also served as a District Court Judge).

The work of the Court is divided into four areas: civil, criminal, administrative and disciplinary, and criminal injuries. The District Court can hear most civil and criminal matters except for offences related to murder and treason. It also has jurisdiction over criminal injuries compensation claims. In the administrative and disciplinary division, the Court hears appeals from various government agencies, tribunals and disciplinary bodies. The Court is usually constituted of a single judge sitting alone or with a jury (in criminal trials only). In certain cases a judge may sit with two assessors who, with the judge, determine factual questions while the judge determines questions of law. For ceremonial occasions such as the swearing in of a new judge, the Court sits as a Full Court constituted of all available judges.

The main seat of the Court is the Sir Samuel Way Building in Victoria Square, Adelaide (which was originally the Charles Moore and Co. Department store). It also conducts circuits in Mount Gambier, Berri, Port Pirie, Whyalla and Port Lincoln (civil), and Mount Gambier and Port Augusta (criminal).

== Current judges of the District Court ==
Judges of the District Court of South Australia as of December 2024 are: (Date of appointment appears in brackets)

=== Chief Judge ===
- Michael Greig Evans (20 December 2016)

=== Judges ===
- Rauf Soulio (12 October 2006)
- Geraldine Davison (25 June 2012)
- Paul Muscat (25 June 2012)
- Paul Slattery (25 June 2012)
- Joanne Tracey (5 March 2015)
- Jane Schammer (12 December 2016)
- Liesl Chapman (31 October 2017)
- Michael Durrant (28 February 2019)
- Jo-Anne Deuter (6 May 2019)
- Joana Fuller (10 December 2019)
- Michael Burnett (2 February 2020)
- Ian Press (20 January 2020)
- Karen Thomas (6 October 2020)
- Heath Barklay (1 November 2021)
- Anthony Allen (17 January 2022)
- Emily Telfer (24 January 2022)
- Kristopher Handshin (2 February 2023)
- Michelle Sutcliffe (2 February 2023)
- Nicolas Alexandrides (2 February 2023)
- Carmen Matteo (30 October 2023)
- Suzanne Joy Mackenzie (27 February 2025)
- Anne Barnett (August 2024)
- Lisa Dunlop (5 May 2025)

=== Associates ===
- Mark Blumberg
- Elizabeth Olsson

== Former judges ==
- Anne Bampton was the first female master of the District Court, when appointed in 2010. In 2013 she was appointed to the Supreme Court of South Australia.
- Simon Stretton, appointed on 4 February 2010, also a member of the punk band Black Chrome, retired in May 2024. Anne Barnett was appointed in his place in August 2024.
- Penelope Eldridge (3 March 2016)
- Liesl Kudelka (formerly Chapman) (31 October 2017)
- Anthony Rossi (13 May 2019)
- Miles Crawley (7 December 2020)
