= Court of record =

Type of trial or appellate court

A court of record is a trial court or appellate court in which a record of the proceedings is captured and preserved, for the possibility of appeal. A court clerk or a court reporter takes down a record of oral proceedings. That written record (and all other evidence) is preserved at least long enough for all appeals to be exhausted, or for some further period of time provided by law (for example, in some U.S. states, death penalty statutes provide that all evidence must be preserved for an extended period of time).

Most courts of record have rules of procedure (see rules of evidence, rules of civil procedure, and rules of criminal procedure) and therefore they require that most parties be represented by counsel (specifically, attorneys holding a license to practice law before the specific tribunal).

In contrast, in courts not of record, oral proceedings are not recorded, and the judge makes their decision based on notes and memory. In most "not of record" proceedings, the parties may appear personally, without lawyers. For example, most small claims courts, traffic courts, justice courts presided over by justices of the peace, many administrative tribunals that make initial governmental administrative decisions such as government benefit determinations, and the like, are not courts of record.

== India ==
The Constitution of India, under Article 129 states that the Supreme Court of India shall be a Court of record with powers to punish for contempt of itself. Similarly, Art 215 declares all High Courts of India to be a Court of Record.

== United Kingdom ==
=== In England and Wales ===
Courts of record are loosely defined in English law. They have been defined as:

1. Courts that set precedent
2. Courts with inherent (ie not specifically given in statute) powers to charge contempt

As such, the following may be defined as courts of record:

Court of record	By which definition
Supreme Court	1, 2
Court of Appeal of England and Wales	1, 2
High Court of Justice	1, 2
Upper Tribunal	1
Employment Appeal Tribunal	1
Crown Court	2

Under an alternative definition, courts or tribunals may be designated by statute as "courts of record" irrespective of any of the three above criteria, such as the County Court under section 1A of the County Courts Act 1984 or the Upper Tribunal pursuant to section 3 of the Tribunals, Courts and Enforcement Act 2007.

=== In Scotland ===
Courts of record are not defined in Scots law.

== United States ==
"Of record" and "not of record" are two polar extremes of a spectrum, and there is a transition zone between them. Many proceedings have an intermediate character, with some "of record" characteristics but not others. For example, in some agencies of the U.S. government, oral arguments in intra-agency appeals are transcribed by a reporter as a matter of the agency's choice, but since the record is not required by statute, other guarantees of 5 U.S.C. §§ 554, 556, and 557 do not apply. For example, in proceedings before executive branch agencies of the U.S. federal government, fully-formal proceedings of record are governed by the "formal adjudication" or "on the record" provisions of §§ 554, 556, and 557, but informal proceedings or "not on the record" proceedings are governed by § 555.

However, powers available to the tribunal turn on the tribunal having full "of record" characteristics. For example, in many states, statutes provide that the power to fine or imprison lies only with courts of record. Similarly, for a court to punish for contempt, there must be a record of exactly what was said by whom and so the power to punish for contempt requires the tribunal have at least a court reporter taking down all proceedings. The rationale is that criminal penalties or contempt penalties may not be imposed unless there is a right of appeal, and an appeal is only meaningful if the trial-level court kept a record of its proceedings.

In some classes of cases, after a determination by an inferior or lower tribunal not of record, a party may take a first-level appeal to a tribunal that is of record. For example, many government administrative agencies delegate initial decisions to a single person who acts informally, typically with a title like "clerk" or "examiner," such as a Social Security claims examiner or a patent examiner. Then, the agency provides a first-level of intra-agency review before a board of appeals that conducts its proceedings on a more formal basis than the proceedings before the initial hearing officer. In most cases, the first level appeal is "trial de novo" (or a 'hearing de novo'). The intra-agency appeal may be of record or not or somewhere between, depending on the agency. That is not an appeal as such but a new proceeding, which completely supersedes the result of the prior agency determination. Often, the review tribunal will not permit introduction of new evidence, or may have evidentiary rules that are quite restrictive. When the first-level adjudication is made by an executive branch agency, and after all intra-agency procedures are exhausted, it is often possible to go to a court to seek judicial review of the judgment of the agency.

The primary function of the record is to serve as the basis for appellate review of the agency- or trial-level proceedings. The record from a trial court includes the evidence introduced by the parties and some form of record of the proceeding itself, which includes copies of all papers filed by the parties and a transcript of any trial, and it may include an audio or videotape of hearings, appearances, or arguments of motions. Exhibits introduced in evidence are maintained in the court record at least for a certain period of time after the case has been tried, when the evidence may be returned to the parties or destroyed. If either party takes an appeal, the lower court produces a copy certified by a unique seal to authenticate the formal record.
