= Magistrates Court of Western Australia =

Court in Western Australia

- Interactive map of Magistrates Court of Western Australia
- 31.955803°S 115.863290°E
- Established: 2005
- Jurisdiction: Western Australia
- Location: Perth and various locations across Western Australia
- Coordinates: 31.955803°S 115.863290°E
- Composition method: Governor appointed by the recommendation of Cabinet.
- Authorised by: Parliament of Western Australia via the: Magistrates Court Act 2004 (WA)
- Appeals to: Supreme Court of Western Australia; District Court of Western Australia
- Judge term length: Mandatory retirement by age of 70
- Website: www.magistratescourt.wa.gov.au

Chief Magistrate
- Currently: Steven Heath

Deputy Chief Magistrate
- Currently: Elizabeth Woods

The Magistrates Court of Western Australia is the first tier court in Western Australia, a state of Australia. It has jurisdiction in respect of criminal and civil matters, as well as a range of administrative matters. The court came into existence in May 2005 and was the result of the amalgamation of the Court of Petty Sessions of Western Australia, Small Claims Tribunal of Western Australia, and the Local Court of Western Australia.

== History ==
The amalgamation of the three courts followed from recommendations made by the Law Reform Commission of Western Australia. The amalgamation also occurred at a time when changes were made to the appointments of justices of the peace, appointment of magistrates and civil procedure in the state by widening the options available for enforcing bad debts.

The reforms envisaged that the jurisdiction of the court for civil claims would increase from $25,000 to $50,000 as well as the ability for the chief magistrate to establish divisions in the court to deal with specific classes of offenders, such as by establishment of a drug court or a family violence court.

== Jurisdiction ==
The court is constituted under the Magistrates Court Act 2004 (WA). It is an inferior court and it is also a court of record. The court has a civil jurisdiction under the Magistrates Court (Civil Proceedings) Act 2004 (WA). The court exercises the criminal jurisdiction which a court of petty sessions previously had or which a court of summary jurisdiction could have exercised prior to the creation of the court. The court also deals with cases under the Restraining Orders Act 1997 (WA), the Dividing fences act, Disposal of uncollected goods and extraordinary drivers licence applications. The court can also exercise any jurisdiction conferred upon it.

== Composition ==
The Governor of Western Australia can appoint magistrates to the court. The governor can also appoint a chief magistrate, as well as deputy chief magistrates.

The court normally sits with a magistrate sitting alone. However, the governor may make a regulation which allows a single justice of the peace or two justices of the peace to sit as the court.

== Caseload ==
In the 2022-23 financial year, the Government of Western Australia recorded 84,251 cases having been heard in the court in that period.
