= ACT Civil and Administrative Tribunal =

- Established: 2 February 2009
- Jurisdiction: Australian Capital Territory
- Location: 15 Constitution Avenue at Civic, Canberra
- Composition method: Executive appointment following advice of the Attorney-General
- Authorised by: Australian Capital Territory Legislative Assembly via the ACT Civil and Administrative Tribunal Act 2008
- Website: https://www.acat.act.gov.au/

The ACT Civil and Administrative Tribunal (ACAT) is a tribunal in the Australian Capital Territory.

It provides a forum for the determination of a wide range of civil disputes, requests for review of administrative decisions, and professional and occupational disciplinary matters.

== History ==
The ACT Civil and Administrative Tribunal was established via the ACT Civil and Administrative Tribunal Act 2008, which took effect on 2 February 2009.

The tribunal took over the work of several existing tribunals and boards, including the Administrative Appeals Tribunal, Small Claims Court, Discrimination Tribunal, Guardianship and Management of Property Tribunal, Mental Health Tribunal, Residential Tenancies Tribunal, Liquor Licensing Board, Health Professions Tribunal, Legal Practitioners Disciplinary Tribunal, and ACT Court of Appeal Case Records. The records of these former tribunals and boards are held by the ACT Civil and Administrative Tribunal.
