= Magistrates Court of South Australia =

Lowest level court in South Australia

- Coat of arms of South Australia

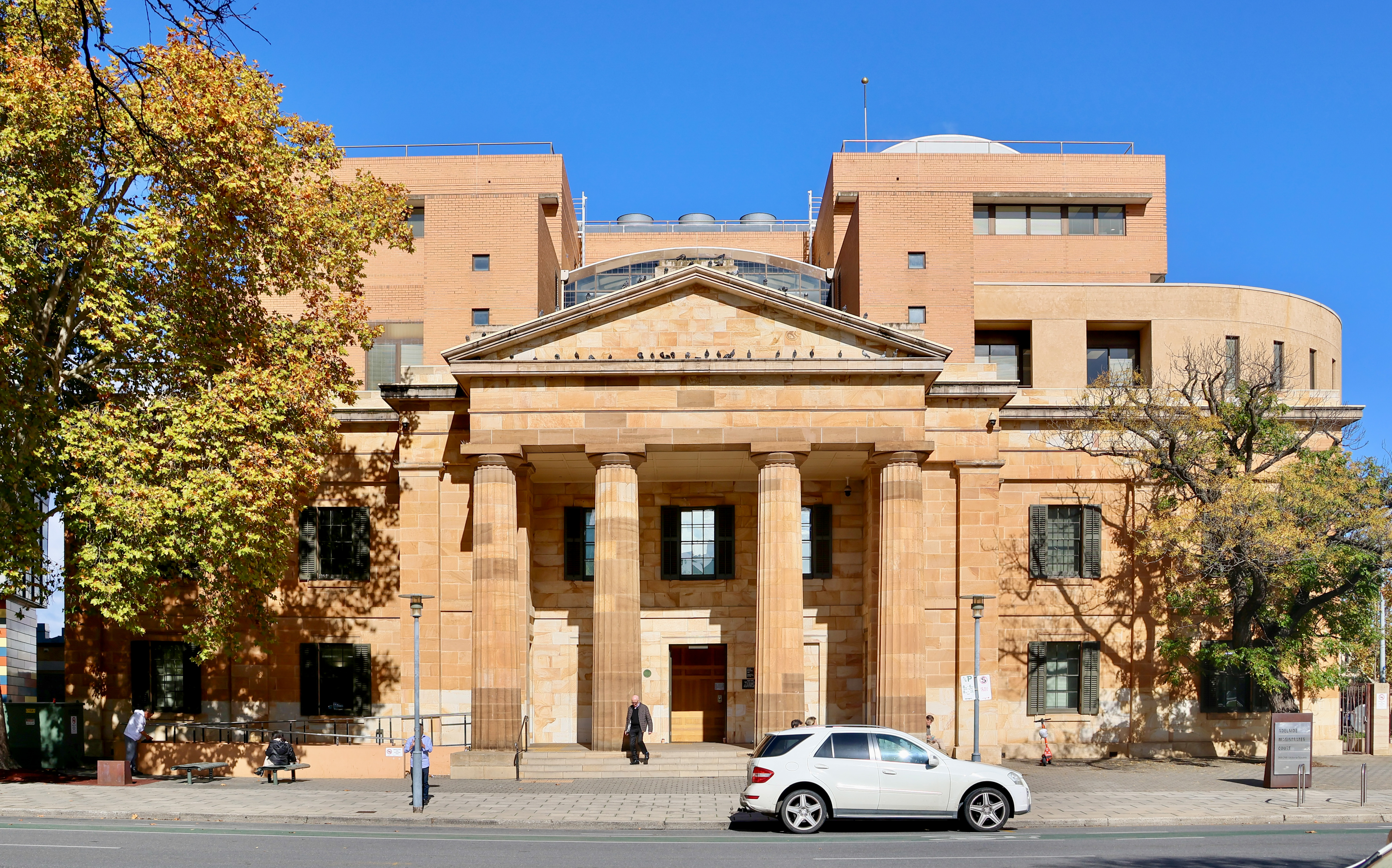
- The building in 2026
- Interactive map of Magistrates Court of South Australia
- 34.930322°S 138.600586°E
- Established: 1837
- Jurisdiction: South Australia
- Location: Various locations across South Australia. The main Magistrates Court is located in Adelaide.
- Coordinates: 34.930322°S 138.600586°E
- Composition method: Vice-regal appointment upon nomination by the Attorney General and Executive Council of South Australia following the advice of the Chief Justice and Chief Magistrate of South Australia.
- Authorised by: Parliament of South Australia via the: Magistrates Court Act 1991 (SA)
- Appeals to: District Court of South Australia Supreme Court of South Australia
- Judge term length: Mandatory retirement by age of 70
- Website: Magistrates Court of SA

Chief Magistrate
- Currently: Mary-Louise Hribal
- Since: 1 October 2015

The Magistrates Court of South Australia is the lowest level court in the state of South Australia. The Magistrates Court, then known as the Court of Petty Sessions, was established in 1837, by the Court of Sessions Act 1837. It has both original and appellate jurisdiction and hears matters specified in the Magistrates Court Act 1991 (SA).

The Magistrates Court has both a criminal and civil jurisdiction. In its criminal jurisdiction, the Magistrates Court deals with summary offences and minor indictable offences. The court has the power to impose a fine, imprisonment of up to five years for one offence, an intensive correction order (which may include community service) or a good behaviour bond. In its civil jurisdiction, it hears matters involving up to $100,000 for general claims, unless this requirement is waived by the parties to the proceeding.

The Chief Magistrate is the leading judicial officer of the Court. Her Honour Judge Mary-Louise Hribal was appointed to the position on 1 October 2015, and as of February 2023 still holds the position. Including the Chief Magistrate, there are 34 magistrates in South Australia, based in Adelaide and in metropolitan courts at Christies Beach, Elizabeth, Mount Barker and Port Adelaide. There are also nine magistrates based in the regional courts of South Australia.

== Jurisdiction ==
=== Original jurisdiction ===
The Magistrates Court of South Australia is the lowest court in the state and contains the following divisions:

- Criminal Division
- Court of Petty Sessions
- Civil (General Claims) Division
- Civil (Minor Claims) Division
- Civil (Consumer and Business) Division.

The Magistrates Court hears approximately 80% of all civil disputes and every criminal matter commences in this court. In the Magistrates Court only a small proportion of cases actually go to trial as according to Professors Anleu and Mack, it is common for defendants to plead guilty.

==== Criminal division ====
This division of the Magistrates Court hears less serious offences known as summary offences. These offences are defined under section 5 of the Criminal Procedure Act 1921 (SA). Summary offences include those that cannot be punished by imprisonment or offences that carry a maximum imprisonment term of two years or less. Summary offences may also include offences that involve both imprisonment or a fine of $2,500 or less. There are however exceptions to the rule, for example, "an offence of violence" will not be deemed a summary offence even if it fits the other criteria of a summary offence.

The Magistrates Court also hears minor indictable offences, unless the defendant elects to have their case heard in a superior court. Minor indictable offences include those punishable by a maximum fine that is equal to or less than $120,000 or offences that have a maximum penalty of 5 years’ imprisonment. Some offences that have a maximum penalty of more than 5 years' imprisonment, will also be classified as minor indictable offences if they fall into specific categories, for example, indecent assault, destroying property valued at less than $30,000 and other offences, as specified in section 5 of the Criminal Procedure Act 1921 (SA).

The Magistrates Court cannot hear any major indictable offences. If, however, the defendant pleads guilty to a charge for a major indictable offence and the court obtains the consent of the prosecution and defence, the defendant can be sentenced in the Magistrates Court. Major indictable offences are more serious criminal offences. For example, destroying or damaging property with a value greater than A$30,000, or indecent assault against a child under the age of 14, as set out in the Criminal Procedure Act 1921 (SA). This means the Magistrates Court does not have jurisdiction to determine the defendant's innocence or guilt for a major indictable offence, it can only impose penalties on a defendant who has pleaded guilty. However, there is an exception, namely that the Magistrates Court cannot sentence cases involving murder or treason. It also cannot sentence offences for conspiracy to commit murder or treason or assault with intent to commit murder or treason.

The court also has jurisdiction to conduct a committal proceeding (a preliminary examination to see if there is sufficient evidence to commence a case) for any major indictable offences.

In the Magistrates Court, a magistrate is unable to sentence an accused to more than five years' imprisonment for a single offence or ten years' imprisonment for greater than one offence. A fine imposed cannot exceed $150,000 or $300,000 for accused persons found guilty under the Work Health and Safety Act 2012 (SA).

The Magistrate may also remit the case to a superior court if they believe that an offence warrants a higher sentence.

==== Petty Sessions Division ====
This division hears expiable offences such as traffic offences. Such offences are those which police officers and transport authorities can charge people with through an expiation notice and fines given by such authorities range from A$50 to hundreds of dollars. Expiation notices allege that someone has committed an offence and they can either pay the fine or go to court and contest it.

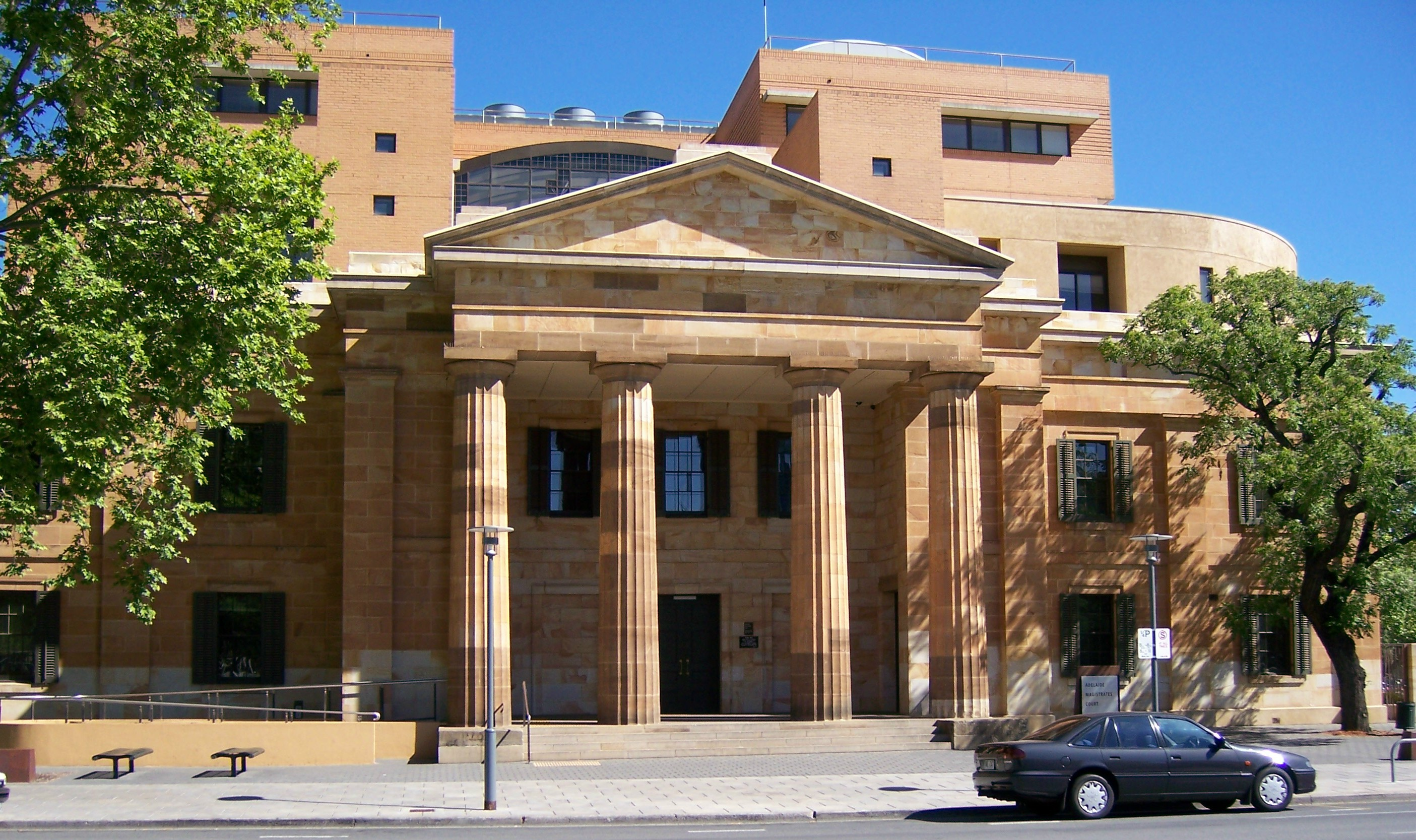
Adelaide Magistrates' Court entrance

The court also hears "prescribed offences", which are offences where the maximum penalty is less than A$2,500 and includes imprisonment. These offences are outlined in the regulations of the Magistrates Court Act 1991 (SA). This division also hears offences which do not include imprisonment and where the maximum penalty is less than $2,500 and may include license disqualification. This division may also hear appeals regarding fines, under the Fines Enforcement and Debt Recovery Act 2017 (SA).

==== Civil division ====
The civil division of the Magistrates Court can hear and determine civil matters where the amount claimed is less than $100,000 and can grant any form of relief necessary when hearing a minor civil action. Parties may however waive this monetary limit and if this occurs, the court can hear matters involving any sum of money.

The monetary limits for each civil division in the Magistrates Court are as follows:

- Minor Claims division: maximum of $12,000
- General Claims division: $12,001–$100,000
- Consumer and Business Division: up to $100,000

The Minor Claims division typically hears neighbourhood disputes and small statutory proceedings including applications under the Fences Act 1975 (SA) or actions in trespass. Parties are not allowed to be represented by a Lawyer unless the opposing party is a legal practitioner, the court believes the party will be "unfairly disadvantaged" without legal representation or if all parties agree to the use of legal representation. Therefore, this division has simple procedures, with little technicalities and legal forms, enabling people to represent themselves.

The General Claims division typically hears contractual, personal injury and debt disputes.

The Consumer and Business Division, hears matters that involve Australian Consumer Law, including rights to a refund, repair or replacement for faulty items, a right to cancel a service when it does not meet the advertised description or services not performed with due skill and care.

The court can also guide the parties towards mediation, which is an alternative dispute method that does not involve going to court. It is cheaper may be a more appropriate alternative to litigation (going to court).

=== Appellate jurisdiction ===
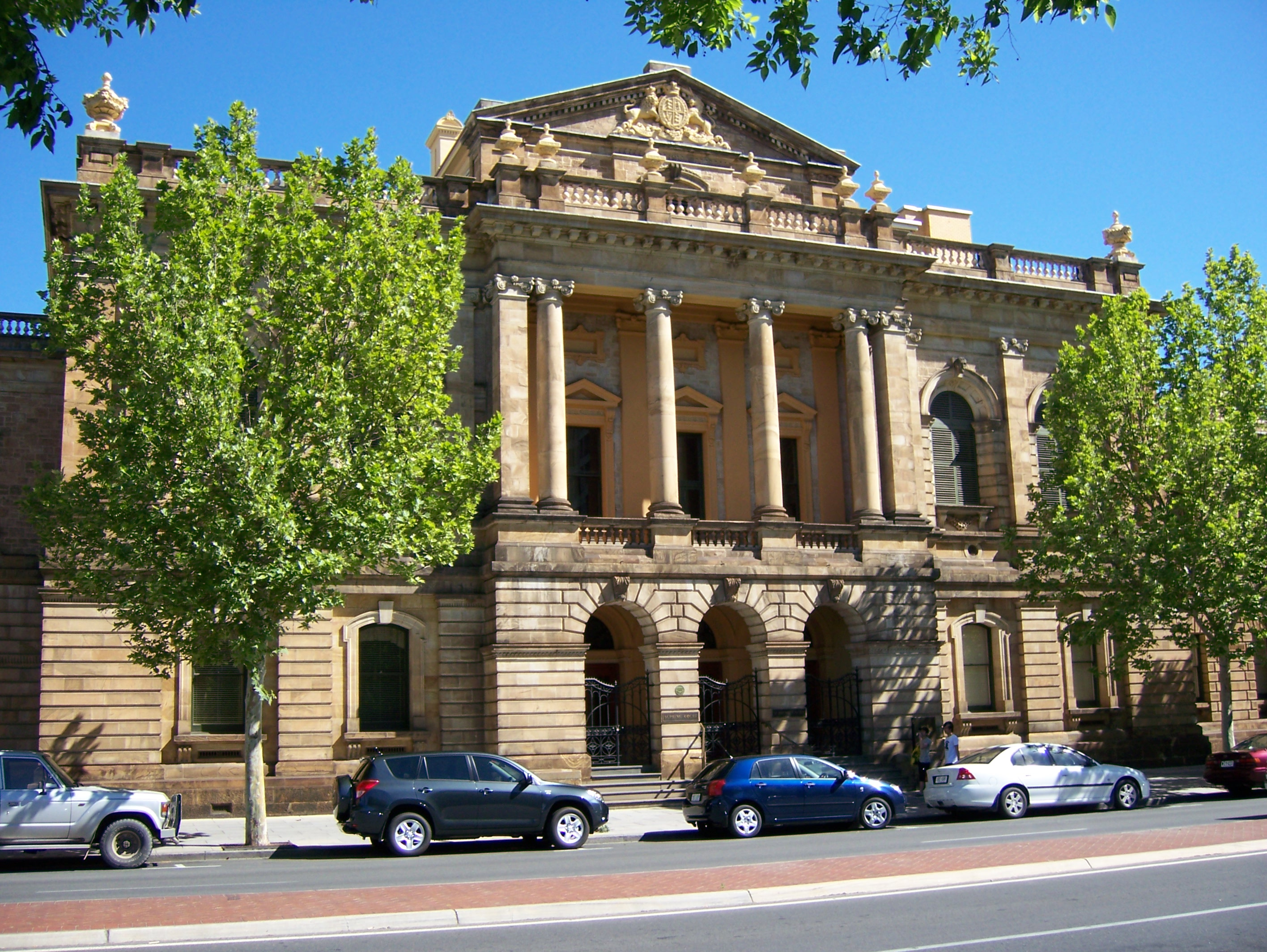
Supreme Court of South Australia.

A sentence or conviction for a minor indictable or summary offence can be appealed this will be heard by a single judge in the Supreme Court. For a second subsequent appeal, the appellant (the person appealing the decision) must obtain permission from the Supreme Court.

Sentences for major indictable offences can be appealed to the Court of Appeal of South Australia, which is a division of the Supreme Court. However, to do this, appellants must first obtain permission from the Court of Appeal. Appeals to the Court of Appeal can also be made for other reasons, if permission is obtained by a judge of the Supreme Court.

== History ==
=== Legal history ===
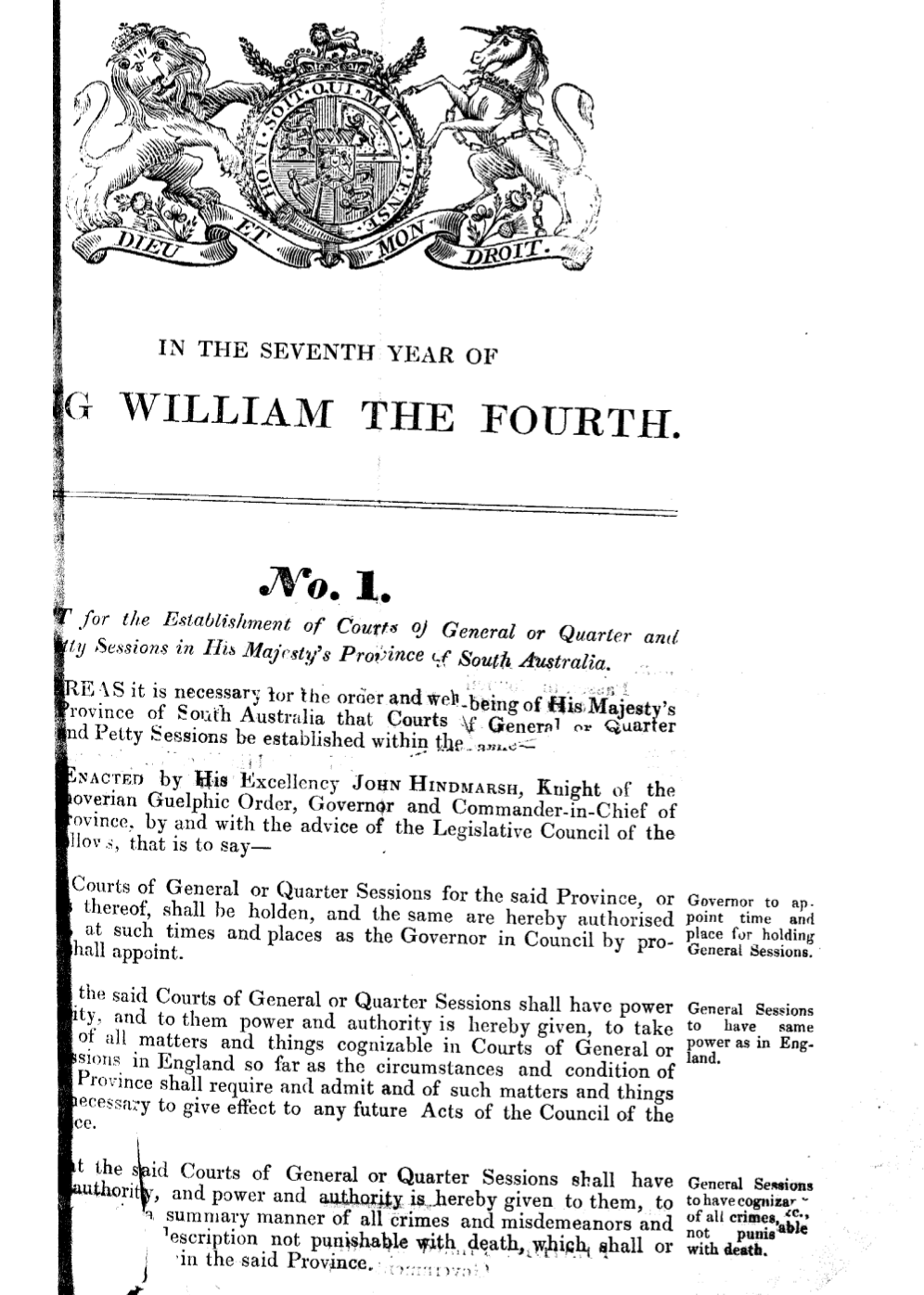
Court of Sessions Act 1837

On 2 January 1837 the Court of Petty Sessions, also known as the Police Court, was created by the Court of Sessions Act 1837. In this court, magistrates would hear summary offences without a jury, for example traffic offences and public intoxication. According to Griffith University, the first Court of Petty Sessions was held at Holdfast Bay on 7 January 1837, with a case involving a dispute between a master and servant.

When grand juries were abolished in 1852, the Court of Petty Sessions adopted this additional role. The role of grand juries was to determine whether there was enough evidence for a "major indictable offence" (a more serious criminal offence) to go to trial in the Supreme Court of South Australia. The Magistrates Court still has this role today and it is now known as a Committal Proceeding.

In 1895 South Australia also became the first Australian state to create a children's court, under the State Children’s Act 1895 (SA). Today, it is known as the Youth Court, under the provisions of the Youth Court Act 1993 (SA).

Until 1969, matters were heard either in the Supreme Court or the Court of Petty Sessions. Thus, the Court of Petty Sessions would also hear intermediate matters, until 1969, when the District Court of South Australia was established by the Local Courts Act Amendment Act 1969 (SA).

In 1991, the Court of Petty Sessions became known as the Magistrates Court, under the Magistrates Court Act 1991 (SA).

In early February 2023, four new magistrates were appointed, including the first two Aboriginal Australian magistrates in the history of the courts – Lana Chester and Natalie Brown.

=== Building history ===
Previously, courts were held in public or government buildings. The first official, purpose-built Magistrates Court was created in 1967, in a building attached to the Supreme Court, on King Williams Street, in Adelaide.

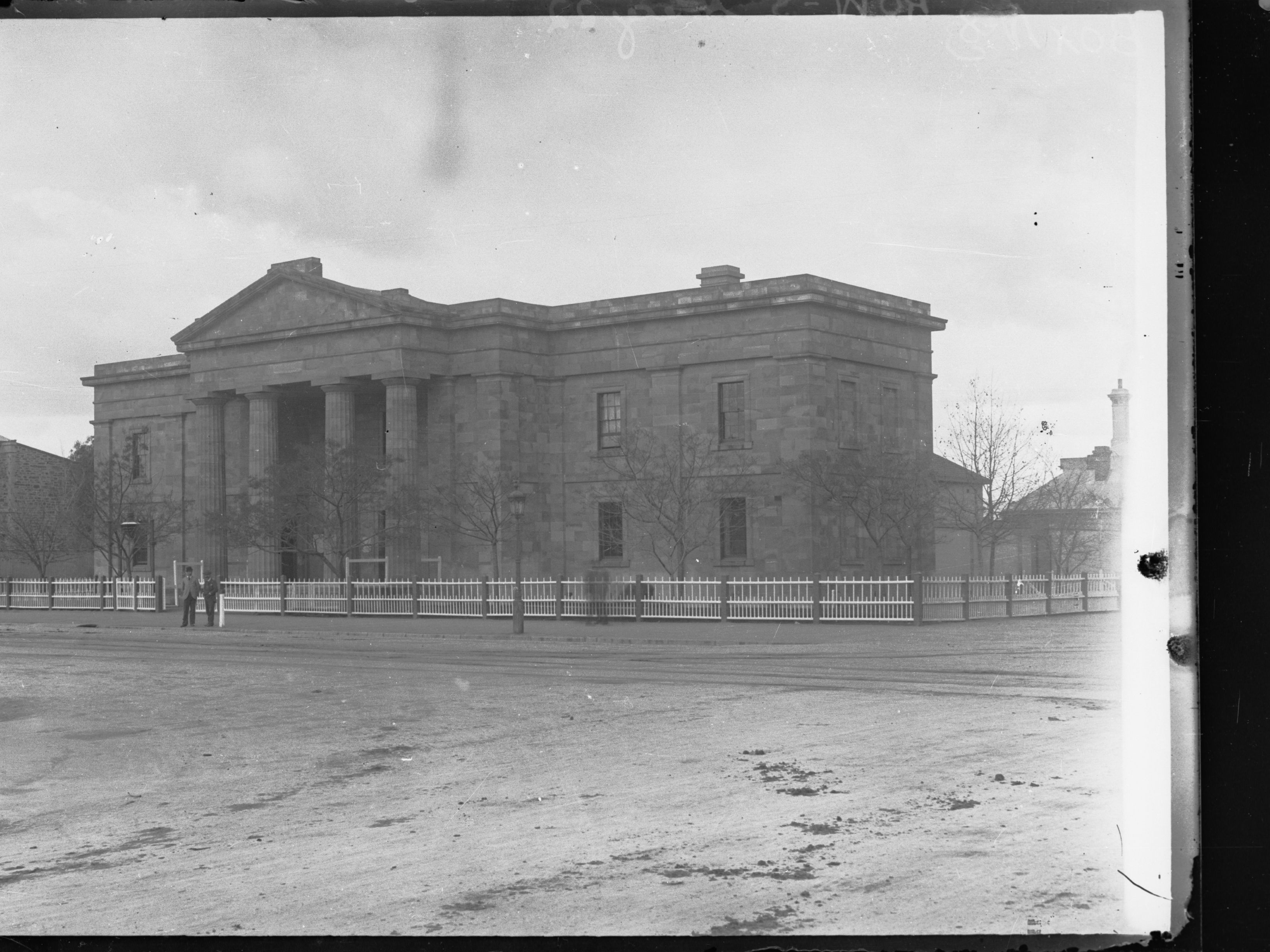
The now Adelaide Magistrates Court building in 1873 when it operated as the Supreme Court of South Australia.

The Adelaide Magistrates Court building is currently located in the old Supreme Court building, on the South-East corner of King William Street and Angas Street in Adelaide. Construction of the building began on 10 November 1847 and finished in February 1851. The architect who designed the building was Richard Lambeth, who succeeded Edward Charles Frome, who was the colonial engineer of Australia. Although the external sandstone structure of the building has remained largely the same, the internal area has been largely altered. The only features that remain are the skylight, public gallery and the canopy.

Renovations to the building occurred in 1995 until 1997, in which a six-storey building was added to the rear of the building and thus the building now contains 25 courtrooms. However, the heritage listed components of the building located at the front and rear were retained.

The Adelaide Magistrates Court building originally housed the Supreme Court until 1873. Between 1873 and 1991 the building was used for the Local and Insolvency Courts. In 1991 the building was used for the Police Court, which is now known as the Magistrates Court.

== Specialist courts and programs ==
=== Nunga Courts ===
Nunga Courts commenced in June 1999, initiated by magistrate Chris Vass. In the Nunga Courts, a Magistrate is advised or helped by an Indigenous Elder or Indigenous Court officer. In this court, the prosecution firstly outlines the case against the defendant, who then has a chance to speak and then members of the Indigenous community may also speak. The elders have no authority delegated by the court but may advise on sentencing options, to ensure they are culturally appropriate.

=== Other courts and programs ===
==== Magistrates Court Diversion Program ====
The Magistrates Court Diversion Program helps to reduce recidivism by providing help to defendants who have a mental health impairment. This program is aimed for defendants who cannot succeed in a defence of mental unfitness under s 269 of the Criminal Law Consolidation Act 1935 (SA) but nevertheless have mental health issues that contributed to their offending.

==== Family Violence Court ====
The Family Violence Court is another specialist court sitting weekly in Adelaide, Elizabeth Magistrates Court and Port Adelaide. It hears domestic violence cases with a focus on “feminist perspectives of power relations and gender” and offers protection and support for women and children. The Family Violence Court also has the power to issue intervention orders (formerly known as restraining orders), which may contain conditions such as forbidding the defendant from visiting the victim's home or from contacting the victim. Defendants may also be referred to the Abuse Prevention Intervention Program and participation in this program may be a part of their intervention order or as a condition of their bail. This program aims to address the defendant's violent and abusive behaviours and is supervised by a Community Correctional Services Officer. A progress report and final report may be given to the Magistrate at the end of the program, detailing the defendant's participation, behavioural and attitudinal changes and attendance. This report can be considered when the defendant is sentenced.

==== Treatment Intervention Court ====
The Treatment Intervention Court, previously known as the ‘Drug Court’, originated from the United States, which developed this type of court in the 1980s. The Treatment Intervention Court is a non-adversarial court, meaning that there is no prosecution and defence and the magistrate talks directly to the defendant. This court hears summary and minor indictable offences that are associated with an illicit drug dependence. It also contains four support programs which may include rehabilitation, restrictive bail conditions (such as home detention), reviews (which means the defendant must frequently appear in court), random urine testing, group therapy or counselling. The aim of the program is to prevent defendants from re-offending and provide alternatives to sentencing with methods proven to aid recovery.

To be admitted into the program, defendants must first be referred by the police, a Magistrate, a solicitor, someone they know, a guardian or they may refer themselves. Once this referral is made, a meeting is held with a Magistrate who may accept the person into the program if they deem the person suitable, whilst considering the safety of the community (since the person will be released into the community on bail during the program). After the person participates in the program, sentencing will occur but the sentencing process will not consider the fact that a defendant has performed poorly or not made satisfactory progress in the program.

The Treatment Intervention Court contains four different programs or "streams", which include:

1. The substance dependence stream: 12-month duration and only available in the Adelaide Magistrates Court (previously known as the Drug Court Program). The program includes bail but with home detention and electronic monitoring for the first three months and a night curfew for the remaining months. Additionally, there are drug-screening tests, attendance to court fortnightly for the first three months and then monthly, individual and group treatment programs. A case management plan is also developed, that is specific to the defendant and will help plan their recovery.
2. Substance dependence stream: 6-month duration. Interventions include bail, supervised drug tests, attending court every fortnight for the first two months and then monthly for the remaining months of the program and referral to drug treatment services or more specific programs as necessary.
3. Mental impairment stream: 6-month duration, involves interventions including release on bail, communication with Case Managers to organise access to mental health and/or disability services, attending treatment appointments with support and attending court every two months. Reports are created and given to the court regarding the defendant's attendance and participation in the program.
4. Co-morbidity stream: 6 months, intended for defendants suffering both a mental health impairment and substance dependency issues. Interventions are similar to the Substance dependence stream but include weekly or fortnightly communication with a Program Supervisor.

The twelve-month program is suited to defendant's facing a term of imprisonment and where there is a strong link between their offending and their illicit drug dependence thus warranting a more intensive program. The six month programs are intended for defendants who committed minor indictable and/or summary offences, where their mental health impairment or illicit substance dependence was related to their offending.

The Treatment Intervention Court also operates in the Youth Court, and the associated programs have a duration of six-months. The program began in 2011 and replaced the Youth Court Assessment and Referral Drug Scheme (Youth CARDS) and the former Youth Court Diversion Program (YCDP). Treatment is often provided by psychologists and the program is aimed at young people who are ineligible for family conferences, in which case they are normally diverted to this program.

=== Magistrates Legal Advice Clinic ===
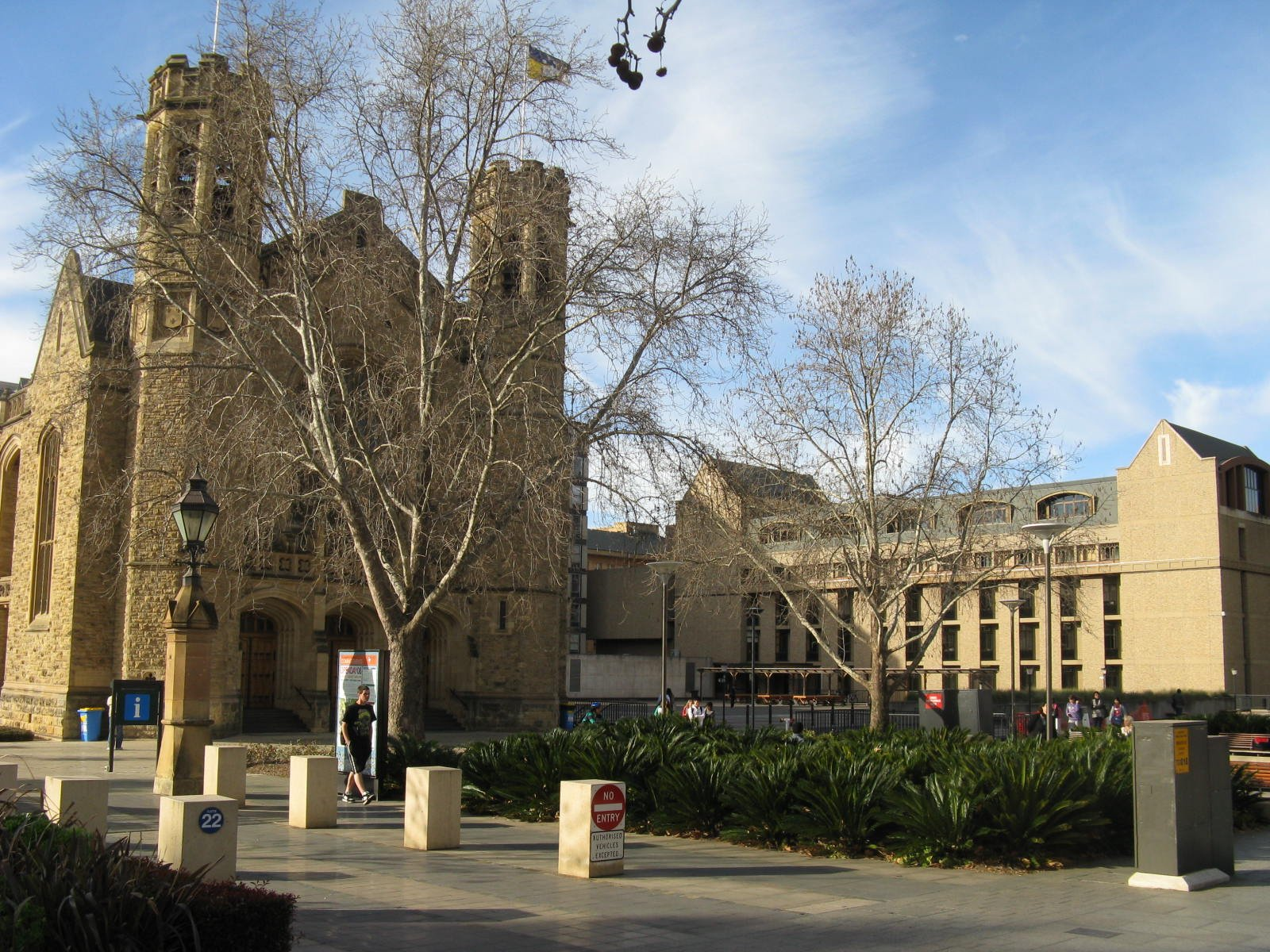
The University of Adelaide Law School (on right), who operates the Legal Advice Clinic.

The Magistrates Court Legal Advice Service (MCLAS) is a service that provides free legal advice to individuals involved in disputes that fit into the minor civil claims category, namely, involving less than A$12,000. It is operated by final year law students studying at the University of Adelaide and supervised by qualified legal practitioners. Common matters include “fencing disputes, building disputes, claims in negligence, contractual disputes, and other types of matters.”

This program was founded in 1997 by Adelaide Law School and originally began as an elective subject for final year students named the 'Clinic Legal Education Program'. Initially only two law students were accepted into the program and Margaret Castles, a professor at the university, oversaw the program. In 2001, a stand-alone legal advice clinic was established at the Adelaide Magistrates Court, with the support of a Strategic Initiative Grant from the University of Adelaide.

== Appointment process, composition and etiquette ==
=== Appointment process ===
In South Australia, Magistrates are appointed by the Governor of South Australia based on the recommendations of the Attorney-General. Before the Attorney-General makes a recommendation, they must first consult with the Chief Justice of South Australia and the Chief Magistrate. Magistrates can be appointed on a full-time or part-time basis and they must have at least five years' experience working as a legal practitioner. To be appointed as Chief Magistrate, the applicant must have at least seven years' experience as a legal practitioner. Magistrates must retire at the age of 70 years old but they may also retire when they reach the age of 55 years old.

=== Composition ===
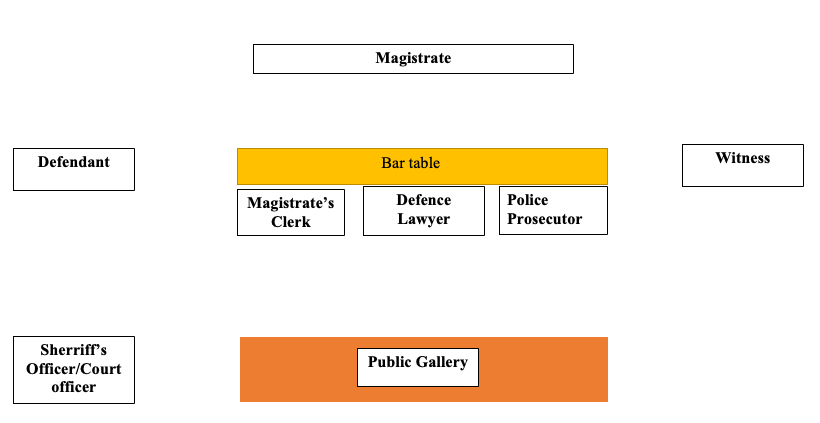
Criminal Court Layout of the Magistrates Court of South Australia.

The Magistrates Court is currently composed of 34 magistrates. The Chief Magistrate is Her Honour Mary-Louise Hribal, who was appointed in 2015.

In the Magistrates Court, the magistrate sits at the front of the court, on the bench, which is elevated so that the Magistrate sits at a higher level than the rest of the court. In front of the Magistrate is the Bar Table where the magistrate's clerk (assistant, who records the proceedings), the defence lawyer and the Police Prosecutor sit and stand. The Police Prosecutor is can be either a uniformed police office or a solicitor. They could be representing the State of South Australia, a State or Government department (for example, a fisheries officer, park ranger) or a Local Government Council. Their role is to the inform the court as to the type of offence that the defendant has allegedly committed and to prove that the defendant committed this criminal offence, beyond reasonable doubt.

In the civil divisions of the Magistrates Court, the Bar Table will have a representative from both parties sitting at it instead of a prosecution and defence. The representatives will be a lawyer or the individuals themselves if the case belongs to the Minor Claims Division (involving less than $12,000).

The public gallery is located behind the Bar Table and this is where members of the public are able to sit and observe the court. The defendant (the person on trial) sits in a box to the right of the Magistrate and any witnesses will sit in the Witness Box on the left (from the Magistrate's perspective). The Sheriff's Officer sits next to the defendant and their role is to maintain order in the court, to help bring prisoners into and out of the court and to assist individuals coming into the courtroom. The Sheriff's Officer also advises the Magistrates Clerk as to which solicitors, defendants and other parties are present in court and whether they are ready to commence with their case. They also ensure that no defendant leaves the court without signing any bails, bonds or orders of the court if required and that all criminal and civil processes are followed. The Sheriff's officer also has the powers of police to arrest an individual who misbehaves in the courthouse and associated property.

=== Court etiquette ===
Coat of arms of South Australia.

Court Etiquette rules apply universally to all Australian Courts, regardless of the state. Firstly, persons entering the Magistrates Court should dress conservatively and in business attire. Any hats that are not for a religious purpose should be removed. When entering the courtroom, individuals should bow in the direction of the coat of arms (located behind the judge) if the court is in session and enter and leave the courtroom facing the Judge. Turning one's back to the judge is discouraged.

The Judge will signal that they are about to enter the courtroom with three loud knocks on the door that leads to the Judge's chamber. The Court Officer will announce “all rise”. Individuals must stand up from their seats in silence and everyone in the courtroom must bow their head when the Judge bows. Individuals should remain standing until the Judge has sat down. When the Court adjourns, everyone must again rise and remain silent until the Judge has left. The Magistrate must be referred to as “Your Honour”.

== Court locations ==
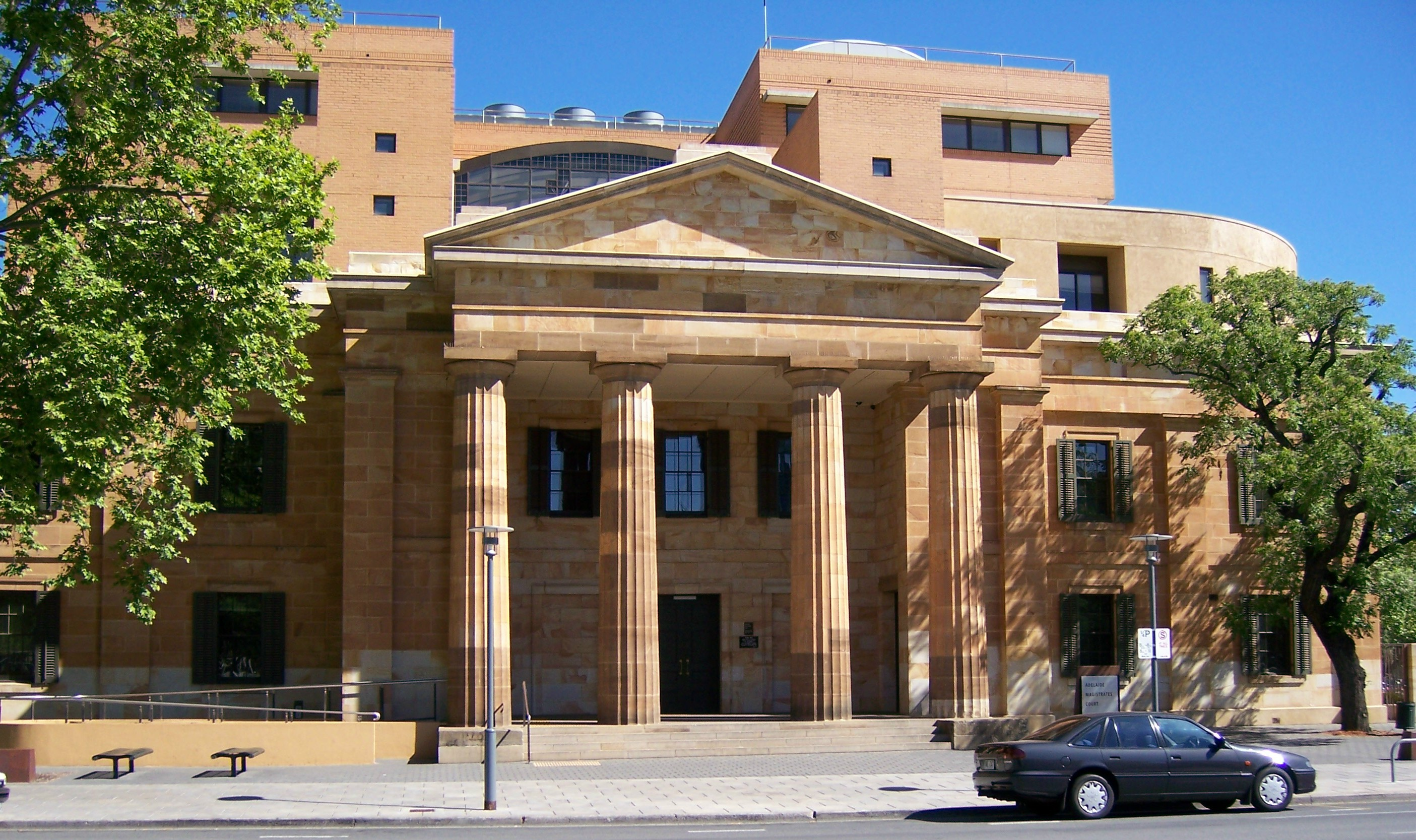
Adelaide Magistrates Court Entrance

In South Australia, the main Magistrates Courts are located at the following locations:

Name	Location
Adelaide Magistrates Court (AMC) (main court)	260–280 Victoria Square, Adelaide SA 5000
Suburban Courts
Christies Beach Magistrates Court	96 Dyson Road, Christies Beach SA 5165
Elizabeth Magistrates Court	15 Frobisher Road, Elizabeth SA 5112
Port Adelaide Magistrates Court	260 St Vincent Street, Port Adelaide, SA 5015
Country Courts
Berri Magistrates Court	4 Kay Avenue, Berri, SA 5343
Mount Gambier Magistrates Court	41 Bay Road, Mount Gambier, SA 5290
Murray Bridge Magistrates Court	7 Bridge Street, Murray Bridge, SA 5253
Port Augusta Magistrates Court	4 Flinders Terrace, Port Augusta, SA 5700
Port Lincoln Magistrates Court	1 Liverpool Street, Port Lincoln, SA 5606
Port Pirie Magistrates Court	20 Main Road, Port Pirie, SA 5540
Whyalla Magistrates Court	1 Whitehead Street, Whyalla, SA 5600

The Magistrates Court also sits on circuit (temporarily, on a rotation) in the following regional locations:

- Amata
- Bordertown
- Ceduna
- Clare
- Coober Pedy
- Iwantja (Indulkana)
- Kaltjiti (Fregon)
- Kadina
- Leigh Creek
- Kingscote
- Maitland
- Mimili
- Millicent
- Naracoorte
- Mount Barker
- Pipalyatjara
- Peterborough
- Roxby Downs
- Pukatja (Ernabella)
- Victor Harbor
- Tanunda
- Yalata
- Waikerie
