= Australian Capital Territory =

Internal territory of Australia

- Territory
- Flag Coat of arms
- Nicknames: Capital Territory; The Territory (local) (Note: The terms "nation's capital" and "Bush Capital" relate to Canberra city, not the whole ACT.)
- Motto: For the King, the Law, and the People
- Location of ACT in Australia; 35°18′29″S 149°07′28″E
- Country: Australia
- Transferred to Commonwealth: 1 January 1911
- Responsible government: 1988
- Capital and largest city: Canberra
- Demonym(s): Territorian (Note: Residents of all three Australian internal territories are referred to as "Territorians".); Canberran, for those in Canberra (Note: Canberran is the denonym for residents of the City of Canberra but not the ACT as a whole.)
- Government: Devolved parliamentary constitutional monarchy within a federal constitutional monarchy
  - Monarch: Charles III
  - Governor-General: Sam Mostyn
  - Chief Minister: Andrew Barr (ALP)
- Legislature: Australian Capital Territory Legislative Assembly
- Judiciary: Supreme Court of the Australian Capital Territory

Parliament of Australia
  - Senate: 2 senators (of 76)
  - House of Representatives: 3 seats (of 150)

Area
  - Total: 2,358 km^{2} (910 sq mi) (8th)
  - Land: 2,358 km^{2} (910 sq mi)
  - Water: 0 km^{2} (0 sq mi)
- Highest elevation (Bimberi Peak): 1,912 m (6,273 ft)
- Lowest elevation (Murrumbidgee River): 429 m (1,407 ft)

Population
  - 2026-03 estimate: 489,668 (7th)
  - Density: 207.7/km^{2} (537.9/sq mi) (1st)
- GSP: 2025 estimate
  - Total: AU$57.582 billion (6th)
  - Per capita: AU$118,775 (3rd)
- HDI (2023): ▲0.988 very high · 1st
- Time zone: UTC+10:00 (AEST)
  - Summer (DST): UTC+11:00 (AEDT)
- Postal abbreviation: ACT
- ISO 3166 code: AU–ACT
- Symbols
- Bird: Gang-gang cockatoo
- Flower: Royal bluebell
- Mammal: Southern brush-tailed rock-wallaby
- Colour(s): Blue and gold
- Website: act.gov.au

The Australian Capital Territory (ACT), known as the Federal Capital Territory until 1938, is an internal territory of Australia. Canberra, the capital city of Australia, is situated within the territory and is the territory's primate city. The Australian Capital Territory is located in southeastern Australia as an enclave surrounded by the state of New South Wales. The territory was excised from New South Wales in 1911 to serve as the seat of government for the Commonwealth, in accordance with Section 125 of the Australian Constitution. Today, the ACT hosts important institutions, such as the Parliament of Australia and High Court of Australia, as well as the headquarters of many federal departments and agencies.

On 1 January 1901, the self-governing Australian colonies federated to form the Commonwealth of Australia. Section 125 of the Australian Constitution provided that a tract of land, situated in New South Wales and not less than 100 miles (160 km) from Sydney, would be ceded to the new federal government. Following discussion and exploration of various sites within New South Wales, the Seat of Government Act 1908 was passed in 1908, and specified a capital in the Yass-Canberra region. The territory was transferred to the federal government by New South Wales on 1 January 1911, and on 12 March 1913, the city of Canberra was officially proclaimed as the nation’s capital.

Whilst the overwhelming majority of the territory’s population resides in the city of Canberra in the territory's north-east, the territory also includes smaller towns such as Williamsdale, Oaks Estate, Uriarra, Tharwa and Hall. The territory also includes the Namadgi National Park, which comprises the majority of land within the territory. Although a common misconception, the Jervis Bay Territory is not part of the ACT; however, ACT laws apply in the Jervis Bay Territory. The territory has a relatively dry, continental climate, experiencing warm to hot summers and cool to cold winters. Among the states and territories of Australia, the Australian Capital Territory is the only one that is geographically landlocked.

The territory is home to important political and governing institutions, as well as many monuments and museums. These include, but are not limited to, the Parliament of Australia, High Court of Australia, Royal Australian Mint, National Gallery of Australia, National Museum of Australia, National Library of Australia, Royal Military College, Australian Defence Force Academy, and the Australian War Memorial. It also hosts the majority of foreign embassies in Australia, as well as regional headquarters of many international organisations, not-for-profits, lobbying groups and professional associations. Several major universities also have campuses in the territory, including the Australian National University, the University of Canberra, the University of New South Wales, Charles Sturt University and the Australian Catholic University.

A locally elected legislative assembly has governed the territory since 1988. However, the Commonwealth maintains authority over the territory and may disallow or overturn local laws. The Commonwealth maintains control over the area known as the Parliamentary Triangle through the National Capital Authority. Residents of the territory, together with residents of the Jervis Bay Territory and Norfolk Island, elect three members of the House of Representatives and two senators. While senators who represent Australian states have fixed six-year terms, the terms of territory senators are not fixed, but rather are governed by the opening and dissolution of the House of Representatives.

With 475,600 residents, the territory is the second-smallest mainland state or territory by population. At the 2016 census, the median weekly income for people in the territory aged over 15 was $998, significantly higher than the national median of $662. The average level of degree qualification in the territory is also higher than the national average. Within the territory, 37.1% of the population hold a bachelor's degree or higher, compared to the national figure of 20%. The ACT also has high standards of living: in 2023, the territory recorded the second-highest subnational Human Development Index (HDI) score of 0.988 out of over 1,700 in the world, just below Zurich.

== History ==
=== Indigenous inhabitants ===
Indigenous Australians have long inhabited the area. Evidence indicates habitation dating back at least 25,000 years, and it is possible that the area was inhabited for considerably longer. The principal group occupying the region were the Ngunnawal people, with the Ngarigo and Walgalu living immediately to the south, the Wandadian to the east, the Gandangara to the north and the Wiradjuri to the north-west.

=== European colonisation ===
Following European settlement, the growth of the new colony of New South Wales led to an increasing demand for arable land. Governor Lachlan Macquarie supported expeditions to open up new lands to the south of Sydney. The 1820s saw further exploration in the Canberra area associated with the construction of a road from Sydney to the Goulburn plains. While working on the project, Charles Throsby learned of a nearby lake and river from the local Indigenous peoples and he accordingly sent Wild to lead a small party to investigate the site. The search was unsuccessful, but they did discover the Yass River, and it is surmised that they would have set foot on part of the future territory.

A second expedition was mounted shortly thereafter, and they became the first Europeans to camp at the Molonglo and Queanbeyan Rivers. However, they failed to find the Murrumbidgee River. The issue of the Murrumbidgee was solved in 1821 when Throsby mounted a third expedition and successfully reached the watercourse, on the way providing the first detailed account of the land that now comprises the territory. The last expedition in the region before settlement was undertaken by Allan Cunningham in 1824. He reported that the region was suitable for grazing and the settlement of the Limestone Plains followed immediately thereafter.

=== Early settlement ===
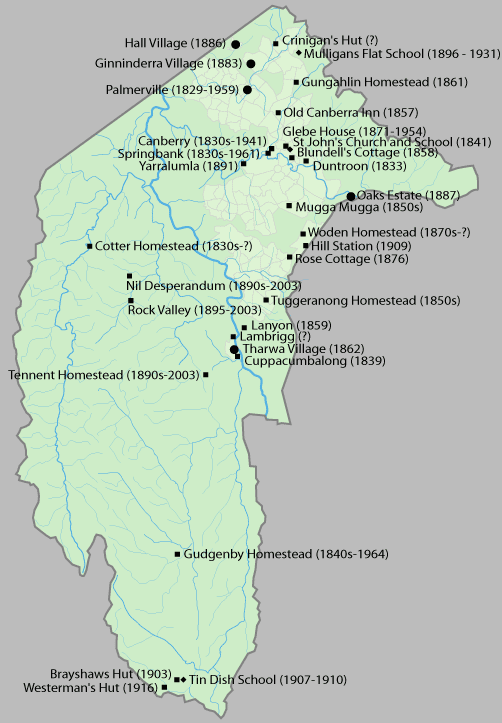
Significant homesteads, structures and settlements in the ACT prior to 1909

The first land grant in the region was made to Joshua John Moore in 1823, and European settlement in the area began in 1824 with the construction of a homestead by his stockmen on what is now the Acton Peninsula. Moore formally purchased the site in 1826 and named the property Canberry or Canberra.

A significant influx of population and economic activity occurred around the 1850s gold rushes. The gold rushes prompted the establishment of communication between Sydney and the region by way of the Cobb & Co coaches, which transported mail and passengers. The first post offices opened in Ginninderra in 1859 and at Lanyon in 1860.

During colonial times, the European communities of Ginninderra, Molonglo and Tuggeranong settled and farmed the surrounding land. The region was also called the Queanbeyan-Yass district, after the two largest towns in the area. The villages of Ginninderra and Tharwa developed to service the local agrarian communities.

During the first 20 years of settlement, there was only limited contact between the settlers and Aboriginal people. Over the succeeding years, the Ngunnawal and other local indigenous people effectively ceased to exist as cohesive and independent communities adhering to their traditional ways of life. Those who had not succumbed to disease and other predations either dispersed to the local settlements or were relocated to more distant Aboriginal reserves set up by the New South Wales government in the latter part of the 19th century.

=== Creation of the territory ===
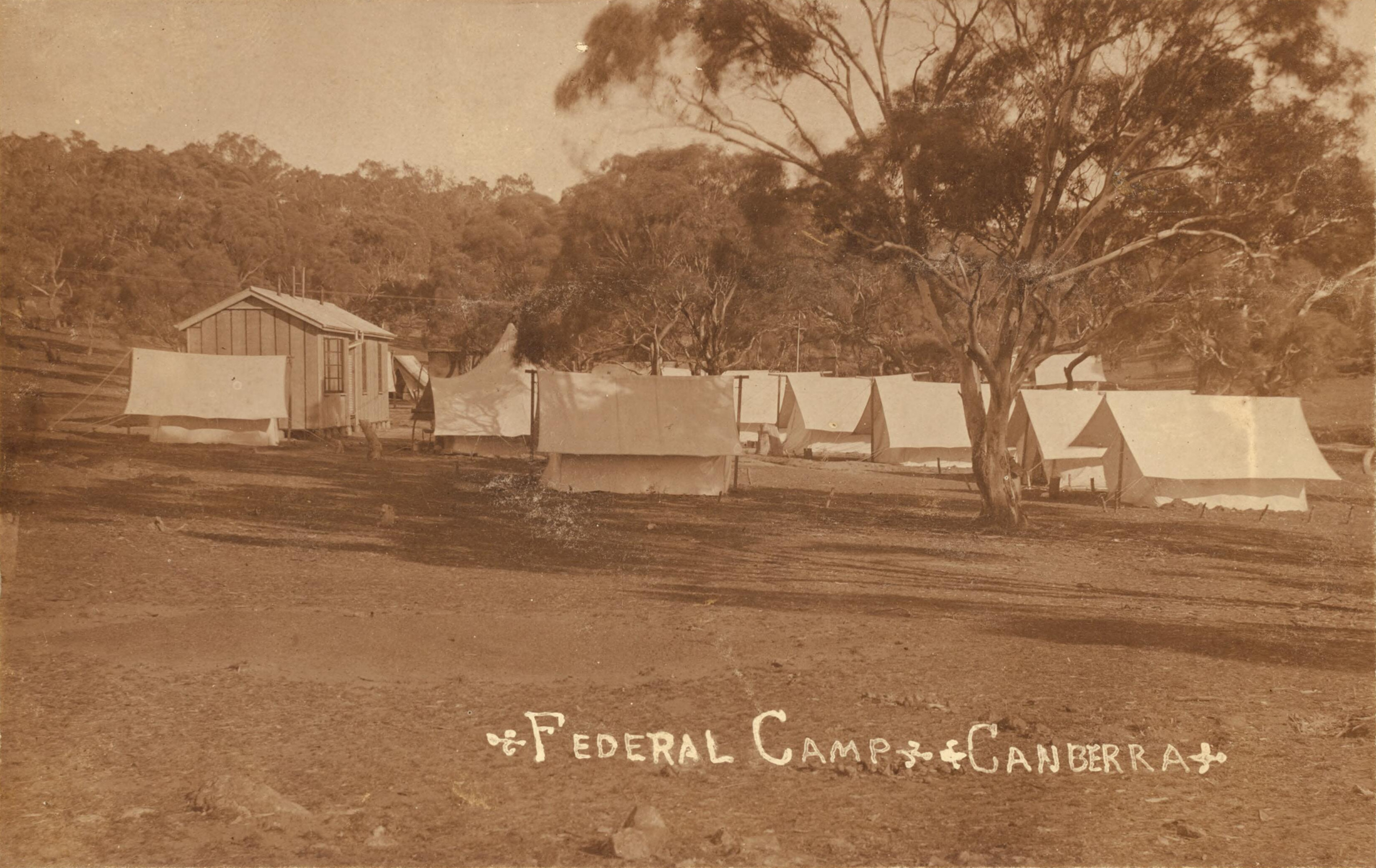
The Federal Capital survey camp was established c. 1909. An extensive survey of the territory was completed by Charles Scrivener and his team in 1915.

In 1898, a referendum on a proposed constitution was held in four of the colonies – New South Wales, South Australia, Tasmania, and Victoria. Although the referendum achieved a majority in all four colonies, the New South Wales referendum failed to gain the minimum number of votes needed for the bill to pass. Following this result, a meeting of the four premiers in 1898 heard from George Reid, the Premier of New South Wales, who argued that locating the future capital in New South Wales would be sufficient to ensure the passage of the bill. The 1899 referendum on this revised bill was successful and passed with sufficient numbers. Section 125 of the Australian Constitution thus provided that, following Federation in 1901, land would be ceded freely to the new federal government.

Location of each site within New South Wales. The 100-mile (160 km) exclusion zone around Sydney is indicated by a red circle.

This, however, left open the question of where to locate the capital. In 1906 and after significant deliberations, New South Wales agreed to cede sufficient land on the condition that it was in the Yass-Canberra region, this site being closer to Sydney. Initially, Dalgety, New South Wales remained at the forefront, but Yass-Canberra prevailed after voting by federal representatives. The Seat of Government Act 1908 was passed in 1908, which repealed the 1904 Act and specified a capital in the Yass-Canberra region. Government surveyor Charles Scrivener was deployed to the region in the same year to map out a specific site and, after an extensive search, settled upon the present location, basing the borders primarily on the need to secure a stable water supply for the planned capital.

Results of the 8 October 1908 House of Representatives ballot
| Site | Distance from Sydney | Ballot | | | | | | | | |
| Site | Distance from Sydney | 1st | 2nd | 3rd | 4th | 5th | 6th | 7th | 8th | 9th |
|---|---|---|---|---|---|---|---|---|---|---|
| Dalgety | 452 km | 27 | 26 | 28 | 28 | 27 | 27 | 24 | 27 | 33 |
| Yass-Canberra | 248 km | 19 | 22 | 23 | 21 | 22 | 22 | 24 | 31 | 39 |
| Tooma | 514 km | 4 | 3 | 5 | 7 | 9 | 9 | 13 | 14 | |
| Lyndhurst | 269 km | 6 | 8 | 7 | 8 | 8 | 8 | 8 | | |
| Armidale | 485 km | 7 | 5 | 5 | 5 | 5 | 5 | | | |
| Tumut | 411 km | 3 | 4 | 3 | 2 | 2 | | | | |
| Canberra | 248 km | 1 | 1 | 1 | 1 | | | | | |
| Bombala | 485 km | 1 | 1 | | | | | | | |
| Albury | 554 km | 2 | | | | | | | | |
| Orange | 254 km | 2 | | | | | | | | |
| Total | | 72 | 70 | 72 | 72 | 73 | 71 | 69 | 72 | 72 |
| Abstention | | 2 | 4 | 2 | 2 | 1 | 3 | 4 | 2 | 2 |
| Absent | | 1 | 1 | 1 | 1 | 1 | 1 | 1 | 1 | 1 |

The territory was transferred to the Commonwealth by New South Wales on 1 January 1911, two years before the naming of Canberra as the national capital on 20 March 1913.

The Commonwealth gained control of all land within the borders of the new territory but ownership only of NSW Crown land, with significant parcels of extant freehold remaining in the hands of their pre-existing owners. Much of this was acquired during World War One, though a few titles were not transferred until the late 20th century.

Land within the territory is granted under a leasehold system, with 99-year residential leases sold to buyers as new suburbs are planned, surveyed, and developed. The current policy is for these leases to be extended for another 99-year period on expiry, subject to payment of an administrative fee. In an arrangement inspired by Georgism, the ideas of 19th-century American economist Henry George, leaseholders had to pay 5% of the unimproved value of the underlying land in rent until the Gorton government abolished it in 1970.

=== Development throughout 20th century ===
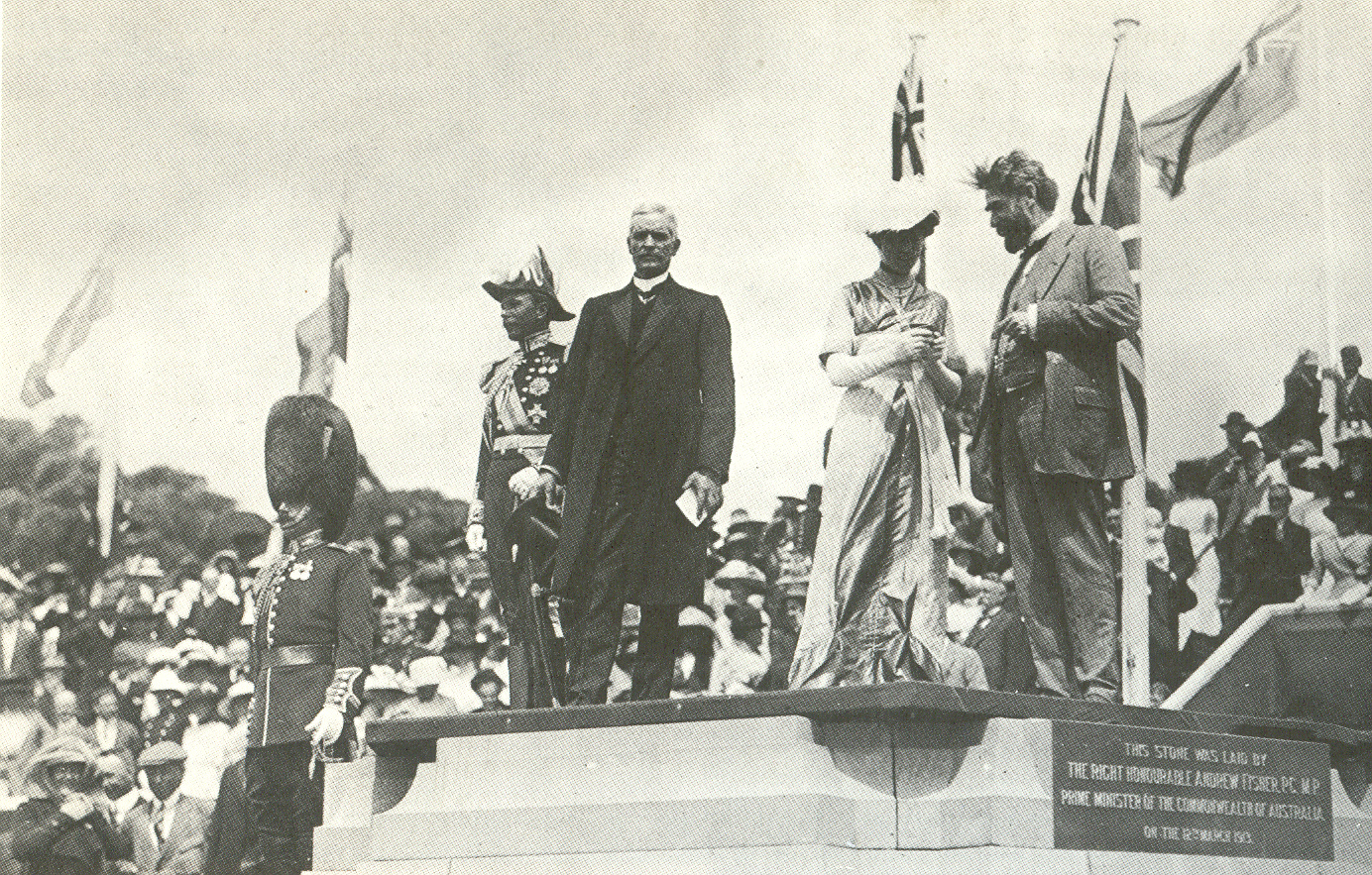
The ceremony for the naming of Canberra, 12 March 1913. Prime Minister Andrew Fisher is standing, centre, in dark suit. To his right is the Governor-General, Lord Denman, and to his left, Lady Denman.

In 1911, an international competition to design the future capital was held; it was won by the Chicago architect Walter Burley Griffin in 1912. The official naming of Canberra occurred on 12 March 1913 and construction began immediately.

After Griffin's departure following difficulty in implementing his project, the Federal Capital Advisory Committee was established in 1920 to advise the government of the construction efforts. The committee had limited success meeting its goals. However, the chairman, John Sulman, was instrumental in applying the ideas of the garden city movement to Griffin's plan. The committee was replaced in 1925 by the Federal Capital Commission.

In 1930, the ACT Advisory Council was established to advise the minister for territories on the community's concerns. In 1934, the Supreme Court of the Australian Capital Territory was established.

From 1938 to 1957, the National Capital Planning and Development Committee continued to plan the further expansion of Canberra. However, it did not have executive power, and decisions were made on the development of Canberra without consulting the committee. During this time, Prime Minister Robert Menzies regarded the state of the national capital as an embarrassment.

After World War II, there was a shortage of housing and office space in Canberra. A Senate Select Committee hearing was held in 1954 to address its development requirements. This Committee recommended the creation of a single planning body with executive power. Consequently, the National Capital Planning and Development Committee was replaced by the National Capital Development Commission in 1957. The National Capital Development Commission ended four decades of disputes over the shape and design of Lake Burley Griffin and construction was completed in 1964 after four years of work. The completion of the centrepiece of Griffin's design finally laid the platform for the development of Griffin's Parliamentary Triangle.

=== Self-government ===
In 1978, an advisory referendum was held to determine the views of citizens resident in the territory about whether there should be self-government. Just under 64 percent of voters rejected devolved government options, in favour of the status quo. Nevertheless, in 1988, the new federal minister for the territory Gary Punch received a report recommending the abolition of the National Capital Development Commission and the formation of a locally elected government. Punch recommended that the Hawke government accept the report's recommendations and subsequently Clyde Holding introduced legislation to grant self-government to the territory in October 1988.

The enactment on 6 December 1988 of the Australian Capital Territory (Self-Government) Act 1988 established the framework for self-government. The first election for the 17-member Australian Capital Territory Legislative Assembly was held on 4 March 1989.

The initial years of self-government were difficult and unstable. A majority of territory residents had opposed self-government and had it imposed upon them by the federal parliament. At the first election, 4 of the 17 seats were won by anti-self-government single-issue parties due to a protest vote by disgruntled Canberrans and a total of 8 were won by minor parties and independents.

In 1992, Labor won eight seats and the minor parties and independents won only three. Stability increased, and in 1995, Kate Carnell became the first elected Liberal chief minister. In 1998, Carnell became the first chief minister to be re-elected.

== Geography ==
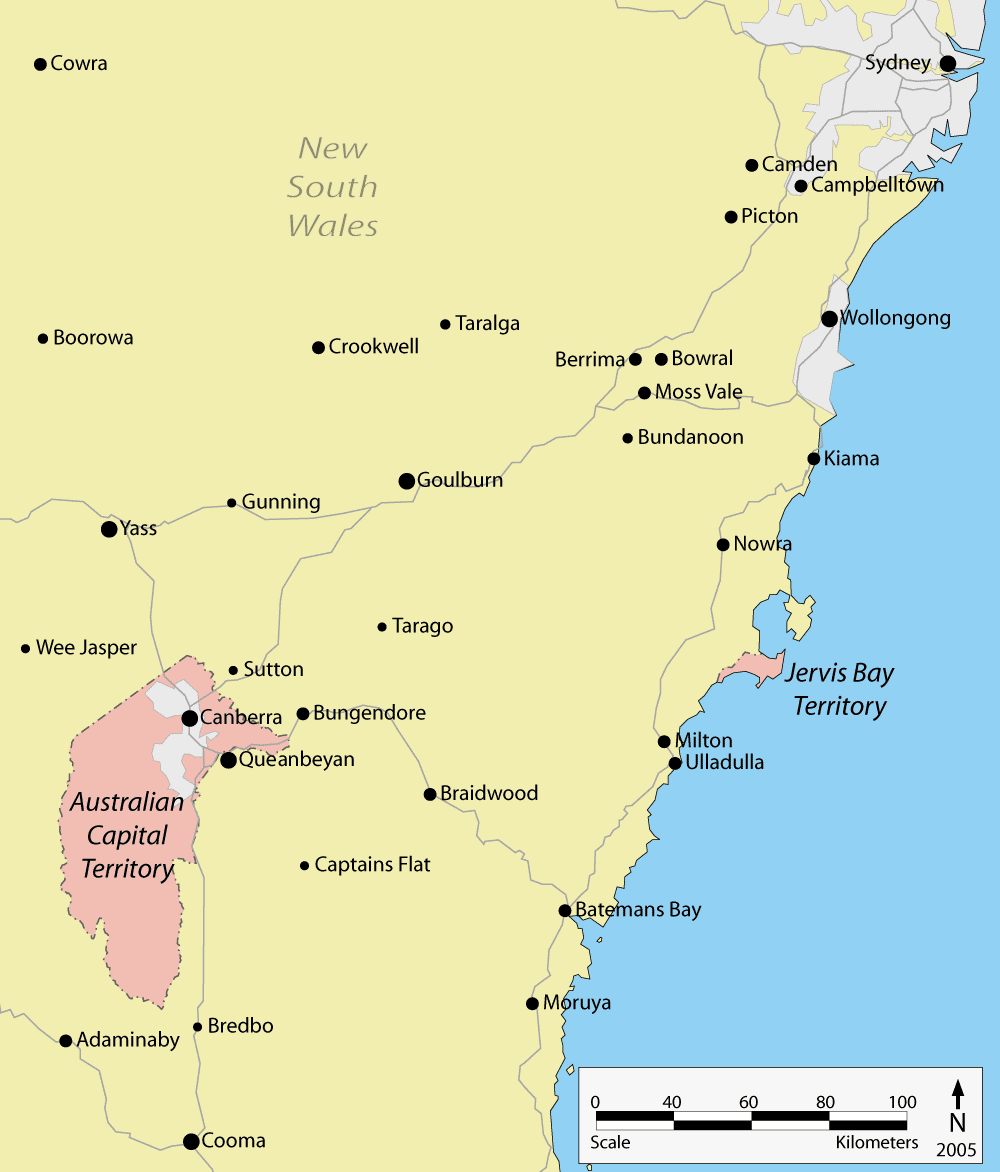
Location of the ACT and Jervis Bay

The territory is 2,358 km^{2} (910 mi^{2}) in area, slightly smaller than Luxembourg.

It is bounded by the Bombala railway line in the east, the watershed of Naas Creek in the south, the watershed of the Cotter River in the west and the watershed of the Molonglo River in the north-east. These boundaries were set to give the territory an adequate water supply. The territory extends about 88.5 km (55.0 mi) north-south between 35.124°S and 35.921°S, and 57.75 km (35.88 mi) west-east between 148.763°E and 149.399°E. (Note: Limits plotted on Google Maps: north: 35.12452°S, 149.12091°E (Gungahlin); east: 35.31918°S, 149.39928°E (Kings Highway); south: 35.92076°S, 149.04608°E (near Bumbalong); west: 35.49551°S, 148.76268°E (Mount Franklin Rd, near Bimberi).) The city area of Canberra occupies the north-eastern corner of this area.

The territory includes the city of Canberra and some towns such as Williamsdale, Oaks Estate, Uriarra Village, Tharwa and Hall. The territory also contains agricultural land (sheep, dairy cattle, vineyards and small amounts of crops) and a large area of national park (Namadgi National Park), much of it mountainous and forested.

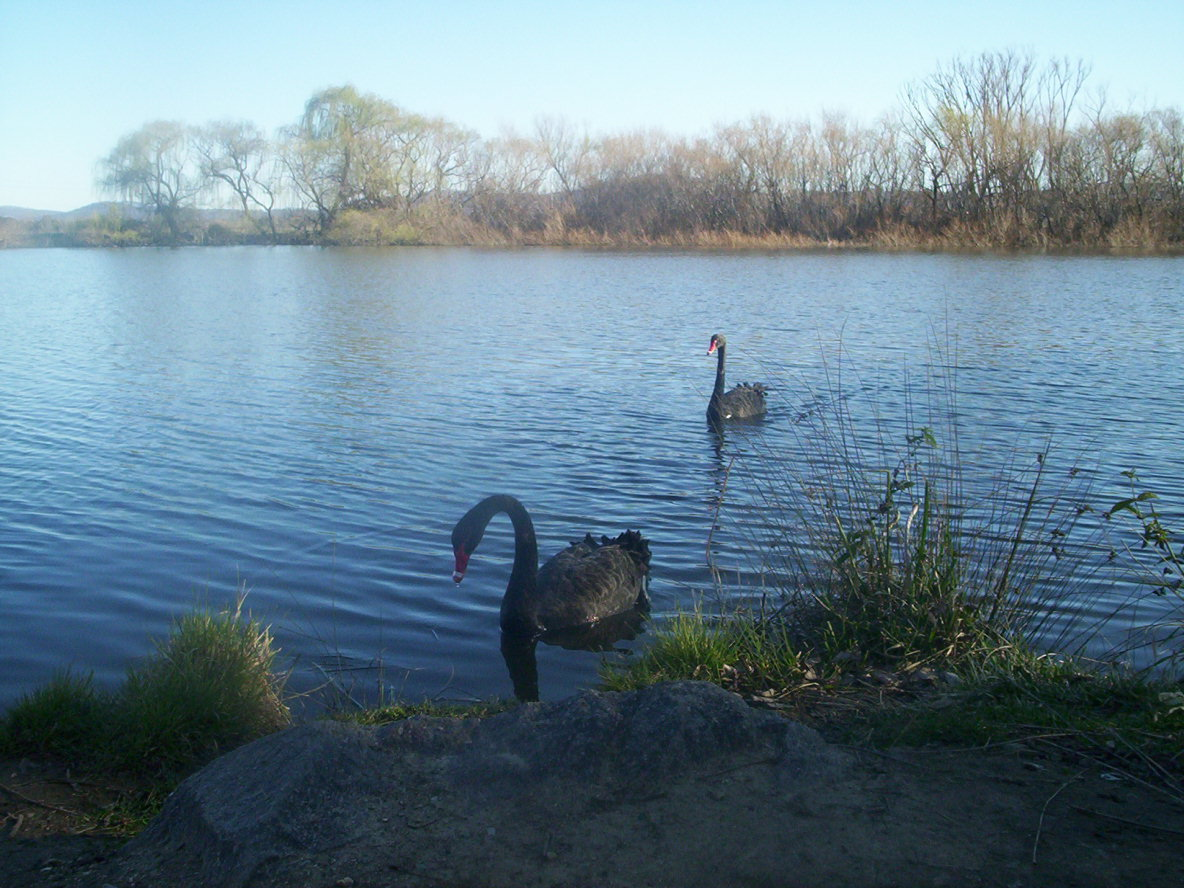
The Molonglo River, located in the north-east of the region

Tidbinbilla is a locality to the south-west of Canberra that features the Tidbinbilla Nature Reserve and the Canberra Deep Space Communication Complex, operated by the United States' NASA as part of its Deep Space Network. The Southern Tablelands Temperate Grassland straddles the state.

The territory includes a large range of mountains, rivers and creeks, largely contained within the Namadgi National Park. These include the Naas and Murrumbidgee Rivers.

In September 2022, a proposal was announced to change the border between NSW and the territory, the first change since the territory was created in 1911. ACT chief minister Andrew Barr said NSW premier Dominic Perrottet had agreed to a proposed border change of 330 ha (1.3 sq mi) in the Ginninderra watershed.

=== Climate ===
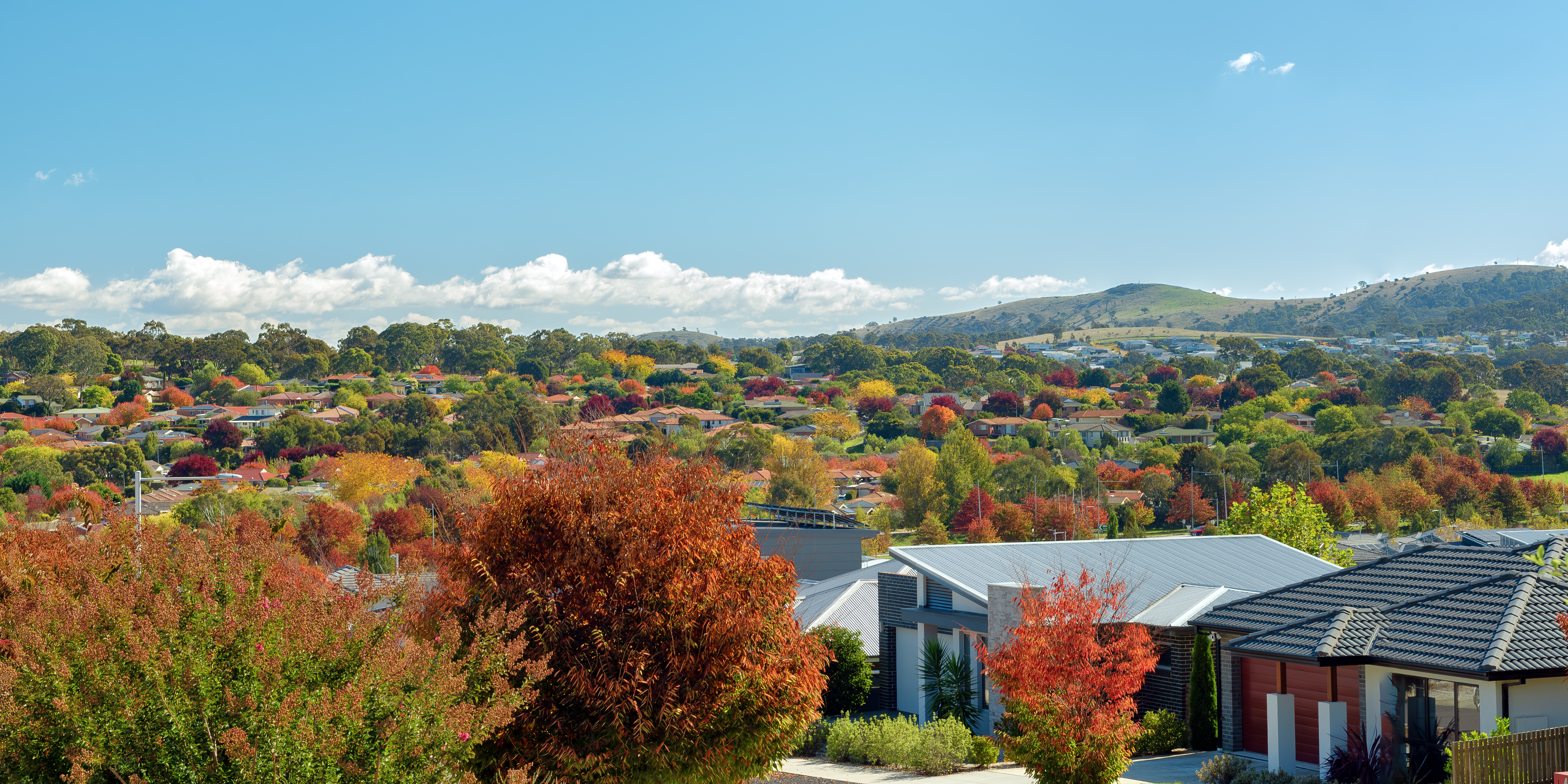
Autumn foliage in Canberra

The territory has a relatively dry, continental climate, experiencing warm to hot summers and cool to cold winters. Under the Köppen-Geiger classification, the territory has an oceanic climate (Cfb).

January is the hottest month with an average high of 27.7 °C. July is the coldest month when the average high drops to 11.2 °C (52.2 °F). The highest maximum temperature recorded in the territory was 44.0 °C on 4 January 2020. The lowest minimum temperature was −10.0 °C on 11 July 1971.

Rainfall varies significantly across the territory. Much higher rainfall occurs in the mountains to the west of Canberra compared to the east. The mountains act as a barrier during winter with the city receiving less rainfall. Average annual rainfall in the territory is 629mm and there is an average of 108 rain days annually. The wettest month is October, with an average rainfall of 65.3mm, and the driest month is June, with an average of 39.6mm.

Frost is common in the winter months. Snow is rare in Canberra's city centre, but the surrounding areas get annual snowfall through winter and often the snow-capped mountains can be seen from the city. The last significant snowfall in the city centre was in 1968.

Smoke haze became synonymous with the 2019/2020 Australian summer. On 1 January 2020 Canberra had the worst air quality of any major city in the world, with an AQI of 7700 (USAQI 949).

Climate data for Canberra Airport, ACT (1981–2010 normals, extremes 1939–present)
| Month | Jan | Feb | Mar | Apr | May | Jun | Jul | Aug | Sep | Oct | Nov | Dec | Year |
|---|---|---|---|---|---|---|---|---|---|---|---|---|---|
| Record high °C (°F) | 44.0 (111.2) | 42.2 (108.0) | 37.5 (99.5) | 32.6 (90.7) | 24.5 (76.1) | 20.1 (68.2) | 19.7 (67.5) | 24.0 (75.2) | 30.2 (86.4) | 32.7 (90.9) | 39.9 (103.8) | 41.6 (106.9) | 44.0 (111.2) |
| Mean daily maximum °C (°F) | 28.7 (83.7) | 27.7 (81.9) | 24.8 (76.6) | 20.5 (68.9) | 16.3 (61.3) | 12.5 (54.5) | 11.8 (53.2) | 13.5 (56.3) | 16.6 (61.9) | 19.9 (67.8) | 23.3 (73.9) | 26.3 (79.3) | 20.2 (68.4) |
| Daily mean °C (°F) | 21.2 (70.2) | 20.7 (69.3) | 17.9 (64.2) | 13.8 (56.8) | 10.0 (50.0) | 6.9 (44.4) | 6.0 (42.8) | 7.4 (45.3) | 10.2 (50.4) | 13.2 (55.8) | 16.4 (61.5) | 19.1 (66.4) | 13.6 (56.5) |
| Mean daily minimum °C (°F) | 13.7 (56.7) | 13.6 (56.5) | 10.9 (51.6) | 7.1 (44.8) | 3.7 (38.7) | 1.3 (34.3) | 0.2 (32.4) | 1.3 (34.3) | 3.8 (38.8) | 6.4 (43.5) | 9.5 (49.1) | 11.9 (53.4) | 7.0 (44.6) |
| Record low °C (°F) | 1.6 (34.9) | 2.8 (37.0) | −1.1 (30.0) | −3.7 (25.3) | −7.5 (18.5) | −8.5 (16.7) | −10.0 (14.0) | −8.5 (16.7) | −6.8 (19.8) | −3.4 (25.9) | −1.8 (28.8) | 0.3 (32.5) | −10.0 (14.0) |
| Average precipitation mm (inches) | 58.5 (2.30) | 56.4 (2.22) | 50.7 (2.00) | 46.0 (1.81) | 44.4 (1.75) | 40.4 (1.59) | 41.4 (1.63) | 46.2 (1.82) | 52.0 (2.05) | 62.4 (2.46) | 64.4 (2.54) | 53.2 (2.09) | 615.2 (24.22) |
| Average precipitation days | 7.3 | 6.7 | 6.9 | 7.3 | 8.4 | 9.8 | 10.5 | 11.1 | 10.2 | 10.4 | 9.8 | 7.7 | 106.1 |
| Mean monthly sunshine hours | 294.5 | 254.3 | 251.1 | 219.0 | 186.0 | 156.0 | 179.8 | 217.0 | 231.0 | 266.6 | 267.0 | 291.4 | 2,813.7 |
Source 1: Climate averages for Canberra Airport Comparison (1939–2010)
Source 2: Special climate statements and climate summaries for more recent extremes

=== Geology ===
Notable geological formations in the territory include the Canberra Formation, the Pittman Formation, Black Mountain Sandstone and State Circle Shale.

In the 1840s fossils of brachiopods and trilobites from the Silurian period were discovered at Woolshed Creek near Duntroon. At the time, these were the oldest fossils discovered in Australia, though this record has now been far surpassed. Other specific geological places of interest include the State Circle cutting and the Deakin anticline.

The oldest rocks in the territory date from the Ordovician around 480 million years ago. During this period the region along with most of Eastern Australia was part of the ocean floor; formations from this period include the Black Mountain Sandstone formation and the Pittman Formation consisting largely of quartz-rich sandstone, siltstone and shale. These formations became exposed when the ocean floor was raised by a major volcanic activity in the Devonian forming much of the east coast of Australia.

=== Flora and fauna ===
The environments range from alpine area on the higher mountains, to sclerophyll forest and to woodland. Much of the territory has been cleared for grazing and is also burnt off by bushfires several times per century. The kinds of plants can be grouped into vascular plants, that include gymnosperms, flowering plants, and ferns, as well as bryophytes, lichens, fungi and freshwater algae. Four flowering plants are endemic to the territory. Several lichens are unique to the territory. Most plants in the territory are characteristic of the Flora of Australia and include well known plants such as Grevillea, Eucalyptus trees and kangaroo grass.

The native forest in the territory was almost wholly eucalypt species and provided a resource for fuel and domestic purposes. By the early 1960s, logging had depleted the eucalypt, and concern about water quality led to the forests being closed. Interest in forestry began in 1915 with trials of a number of species including Pinus radiata on the slopes of Mount Stromlo. Since then, plantations have been expanded, with the benefit of reducing erosion in the Cotter catchment, and the forests are also popular recreation areas.

Fauna in the territory includes representatives from most major Australian animal groups. This includes kangaroos, wallabies, koalas, platypus, echidna, emu, kookaburras and dragon lizards.

== Government and politics ==
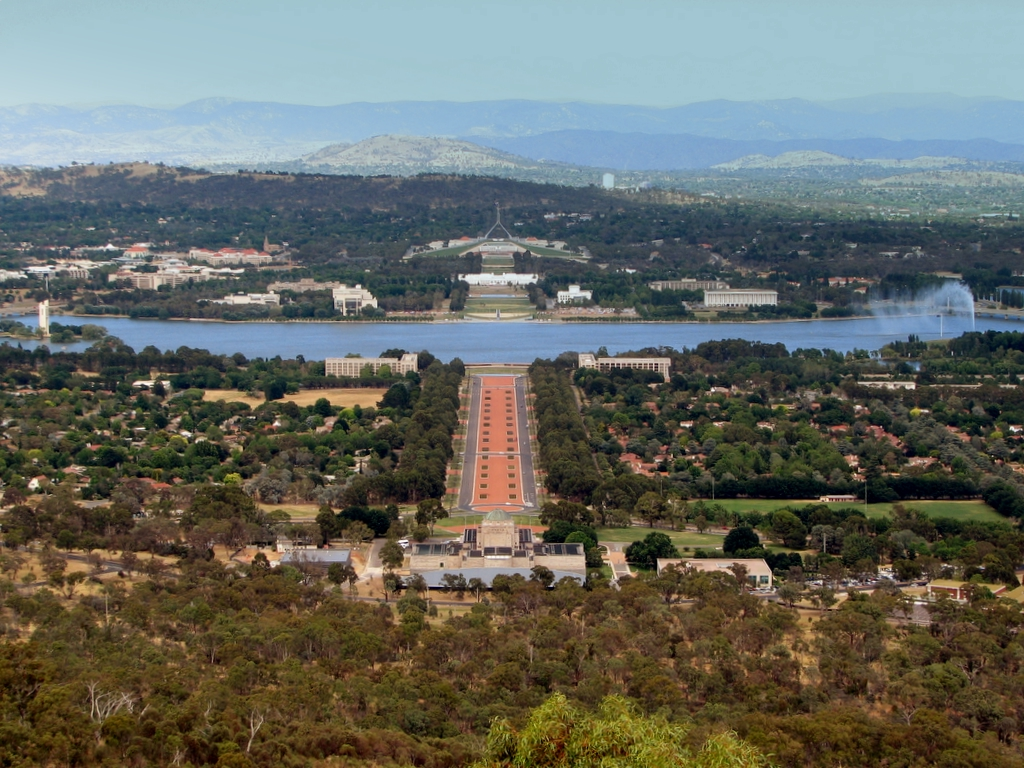
Canberra, in the northeast of the ACT, is an entirely planned city.

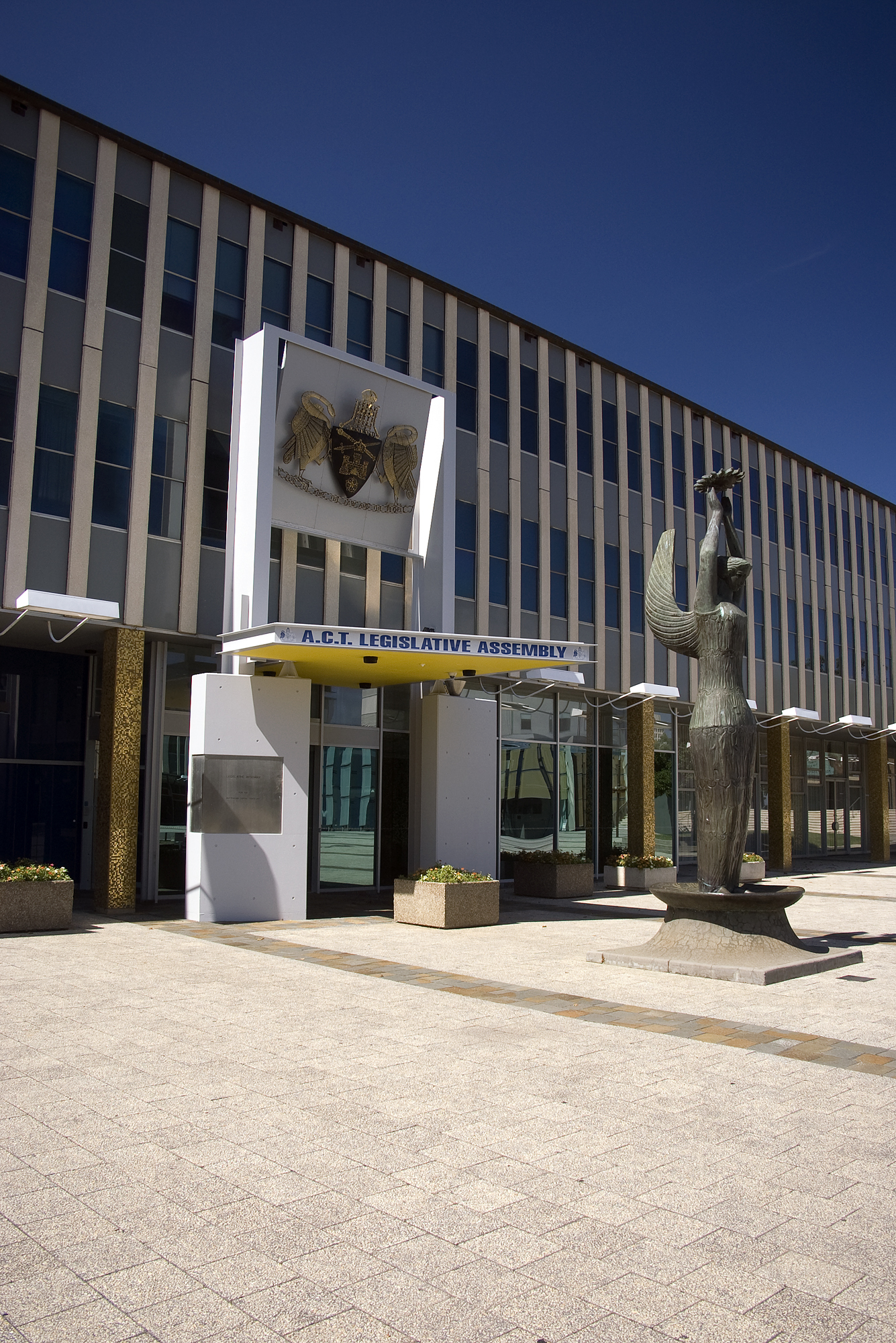
The public entrance to the ACT Legislative Assembly in Civic Square

=== Territory government ===
Unlike the states of Australia which have their own constitutions, territories are governed under a Commonwealth statute—for the ACT, the Australian Capital Territory (Self-Government) Act 1988. The Self-Government Act constitutes a democratic government for the territory consisting of a popularly elected Legislative Assembly which elects a Chief Minister from among its membership who, in turn, appoints an Executive consisting of a number of Ministers.

The executive power of the territory rests with the ACT government, headed by the Chief Minister (currently the Labor Party's Andrew Barr) and consists of ministers appointed by them. The ministers are supported by the ACT Public Service, which is arranged into directorates, and a number of public authorities. The Chief Minister is the equivalent of a State Premier and sits on the National Cabinet. Unlike the states, there is no vice-regal representative who chairs the executive government council. The Chief Minister performs many of the roles that a state governor normally holds in the context of a state; however, the Speaker of the Legislative Assembly gazettes the laws and summons meetings of the Assembly.

The ACT Labor party has been in power since 2001.

The legislative power of the territory is vested in the unicameral Legislative Assembly. The assembly has 25 members, elected from five electorates using the Hare-Clark single transferable voting system. The assembly is presided over by the Speaker (currently the Liberal Party's Jeremy Hanson). The Assembly has almost all of the same powers as the state parliaments, the power to "make laws for the peace, order, and good government of the Territory", with limited exceptions relating to the territory's unique relationship with the commonwealth. The Hare-Clark voting system was adopted after a referendum in 1992 and was entrenched by another referendum in 1995. The electoral system cannot be changed except by a two-thirds majority in the Assembly or a majority vote of support at a public referendum.

There is no level of local government below the territory government as in the states and the functions associated with local government are carried out principally by the Transport Canberra and City Services Directorate. There is an indigenous voice to the ACT government, called the Aboriginal and Torres Strait Islander Elected Body.

Despite the wide powers of the territory government, the federal government continues to have power over the territory. This includes an unused power to dissolve the assembly and appoint a caretaker government in extraordinary circumstances. The federal and territory governments share some officers, such as the Ombudsman. The federal parliament also retains the power to make any law for the territory under section 122 of the Constitution and an exclusive power to legislate for the "seat of government". Territory laws which conflict with federal law are inoperable to the extent of the inconsistency. Land in the territory that is designated to be "National Land" under federal law remains under the control of the federal government, usually represented by the National Capital Authority. The federal parliament can disallow laws enacted by the Assembly by a joint resolution of both houses of Parliament, a power which replaced a federal executive veto in 2011.

=== Judiciary and policing ===
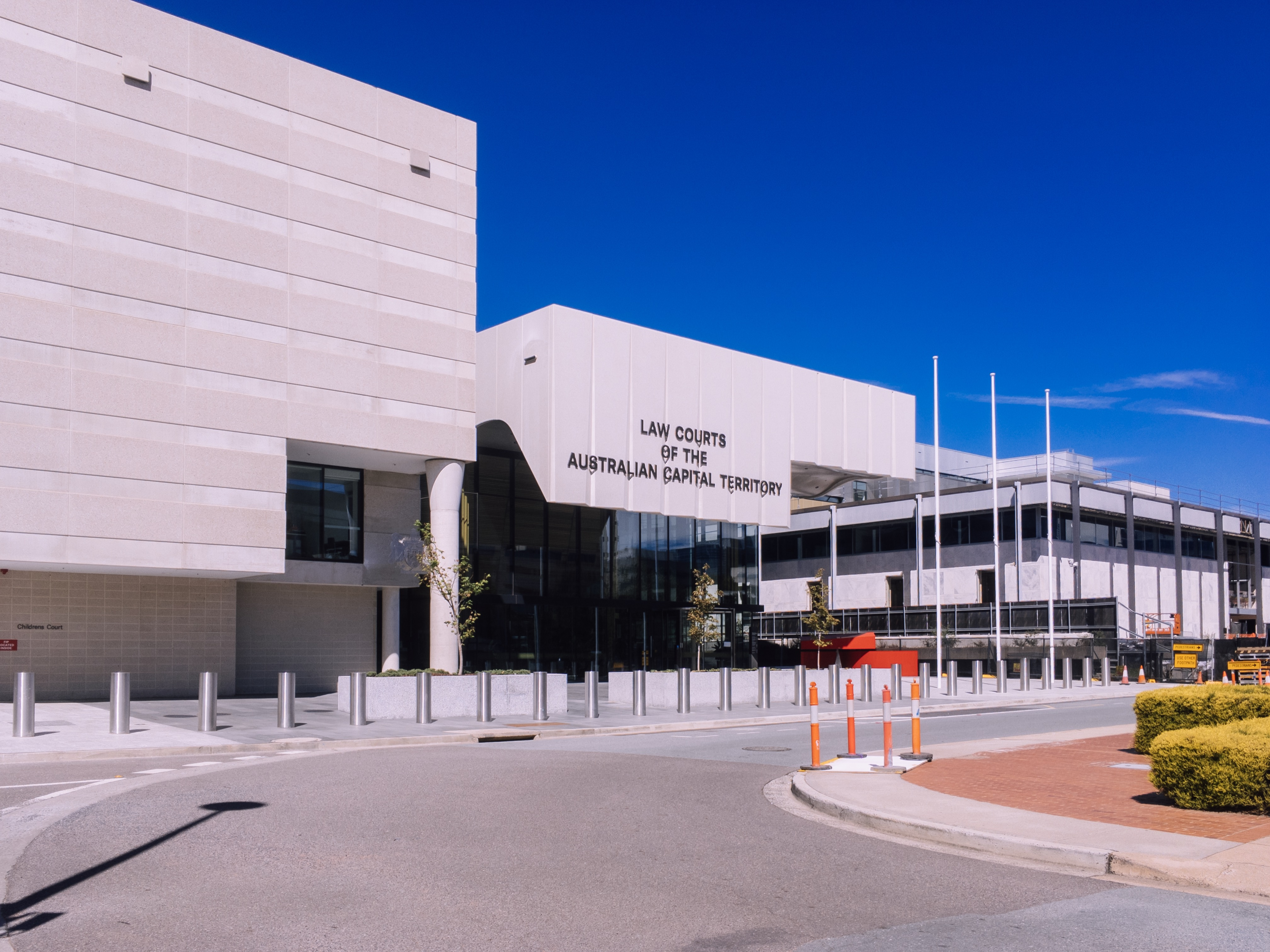
The Law Courts in Civic houses the Supreme Court and the Magistrates' Court

The judicial power of the territory is exercised by the territory courts. These are the Supreme Court of the Australian Capital Territory, the Magistrates Court of the Australian Capital Territory (with summary jurisdiction), and the ACT Civil and Administrative Tribunal. From 2001, appeals from the Supreme Court are heard by a panel of Supreme Court judges sitting as the Court of Appeal. The current Chief Justice is Lucy McCallum and the current Chief Magistrate is Lorraine Walker.

The Federal Court has concurrent jurisdiction over civil matters arising under territory law, a fact which has become increasingly important to the practice of defamation law across Australia.

Policing services are provided by the ACT Policing unit of the Australian Federal Police under agreements between the territory government, the federal government, and the police force. Canberra had the lowest rate of crime of any capital city in Australia as of February 2019.

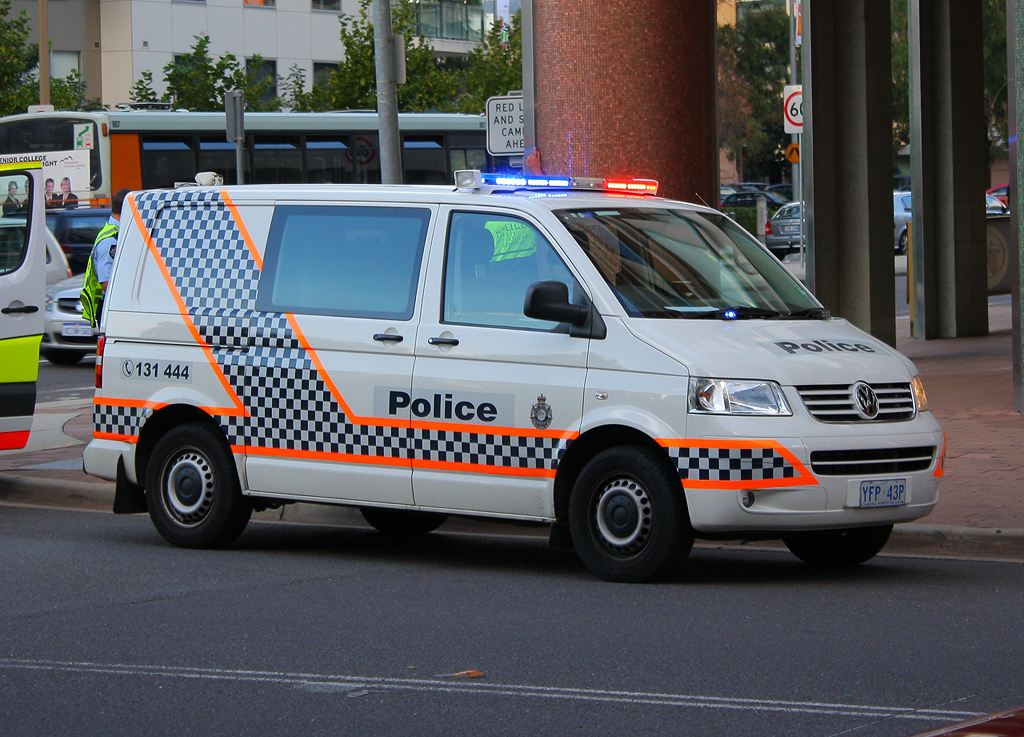
AFP vehicle in Canberra

=== Federal representation ===
In the Australian federal parliament, the territory is represented by three members of the House of Representatives, for the Division of Bean, the Division of Canberra and the Division of Fenner and two Senators. The member for Bean also represents voters of Norfolk Island while the member for Fenner also represent voters of the Jervis Bay Territory. Senators representing the ACT also represent voters of Norfolk Island and the Jervis Bay Territory.

=== Jervis Bay Territory ===
Jervis Bay Territory, created in 1915, is a separate territory but, by the Jervis Bay Territory Acceptance Act 1915 it is subject to ACT law. ACT magistrates conduct court in Jervis Bay Territory.

== Demographics ==
ACT population pyramid in 2021

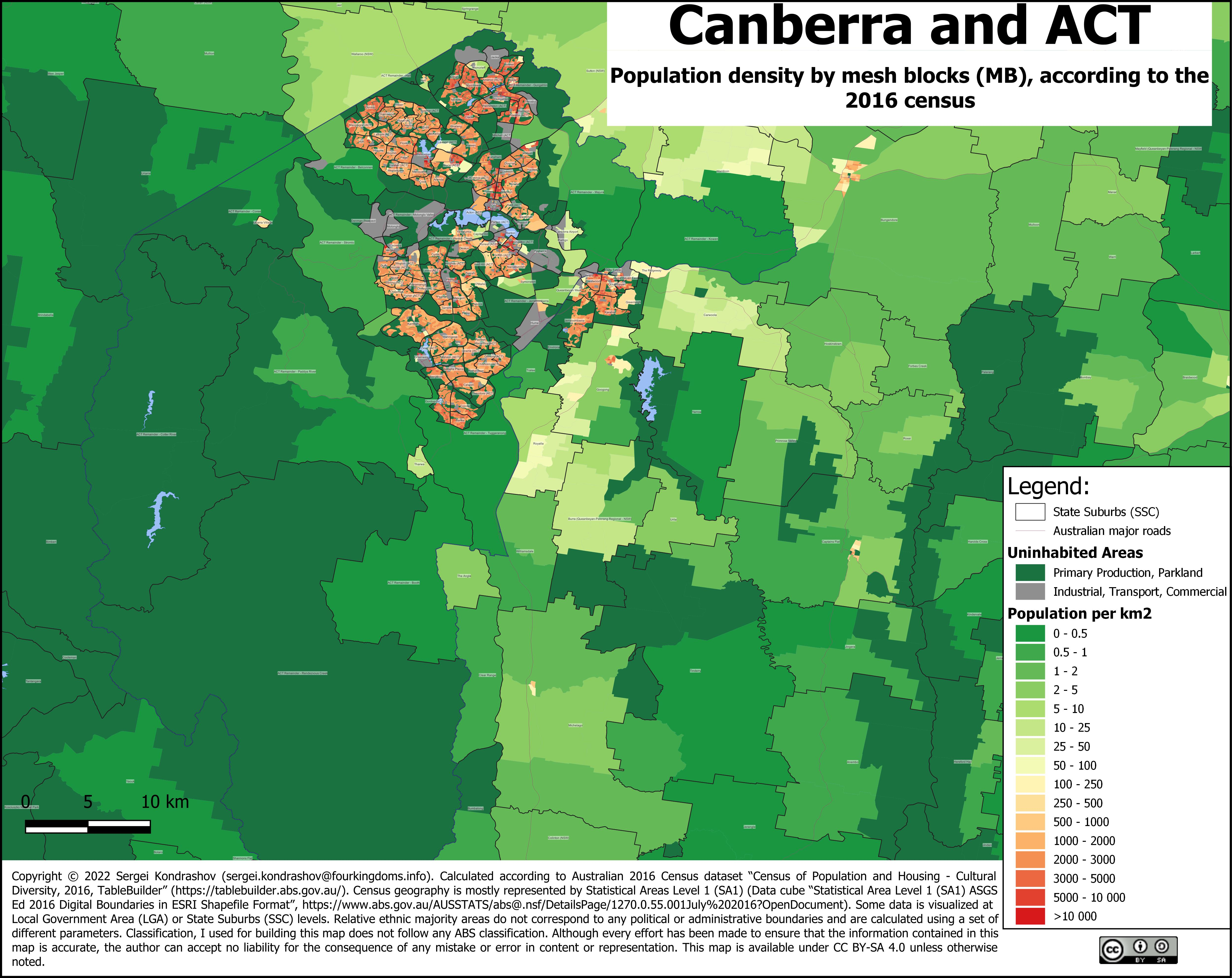
ACT population density by mesh blocks (MB), according to the 2016 census

The Australian Bureau of Statistics estimates that the population of the territory was 453,324 on 31 December 2021, with an annual growth in 2021 of 0.4%. A 2019 projection estimated the population would reach to approximately 700,000 by 2058.

The overwhelming majority of the population reside in the city of Canberra.

At the 2016 census, the median weekly income for people in the territory aged over 15 was $998 while the national average was $662.

The average level of degree qualification in the territory is higher than the national average. Within the territory, 37.1% of the population hold a bachelor's degree level or above education compared to the national figure of 20%.

Historical population

| Year | Pop. | ±% |
|---|---|---|
| 1950 | 19,921 | — |
| 1955 | 31,393 | +57.6% |
| 1960 | 51,208 | +63.1% |
| 1965 | 84,411 | +64.8% |
| 1970 | 137,300 | +62.7% |
| 1979 | 218,995 | +59.5% |
| 1980 | 222,885 | +1.8% |
| 1985 | 251,649 | +12.9% |
| 1990 | 282,263 | +12.2% |
| 1995 | 305,308 | +8.2% |
| 2000 | 343,655 | +12.6% |
| 2005 | 366,339 | +6.6% |

| Year | Pop. | ±% |
|---|---|---|
| 2010 | 397,692 | +8.6% |
| 2011 | 404,973 | +1.8% |
| 2012 | 410,821 | +1.4% |
| 2013 | 416,737 | +1.4% |
| 2014 | 422,747 | +1.4% |
| 2015 | 428,843 | +1.4% |
| 2016 | 435,036 | +1.4% |
| 2017 | 441,318 | +1.4% |
| 2018 | 447,692 | +1.4% |
| 2019 | 452,497 | +1.1% |
| 2020 | 457,330 | +1.1% |
| 2021 | 462,213 | +1.1% |

=== City and towns ===
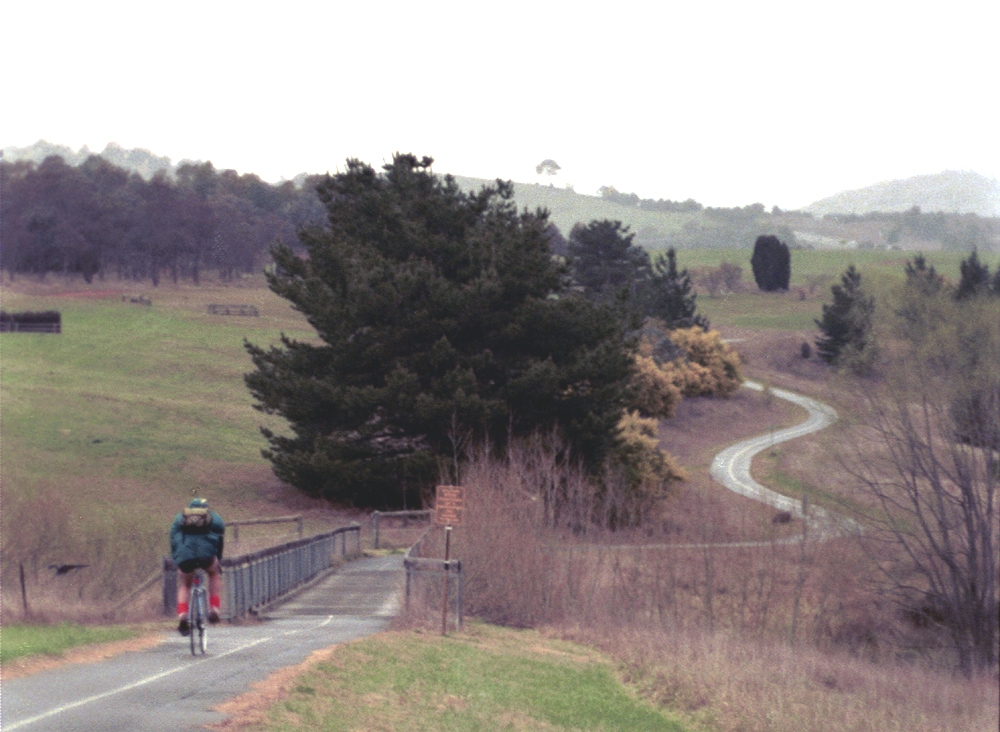
Bikepath to Weston Creek

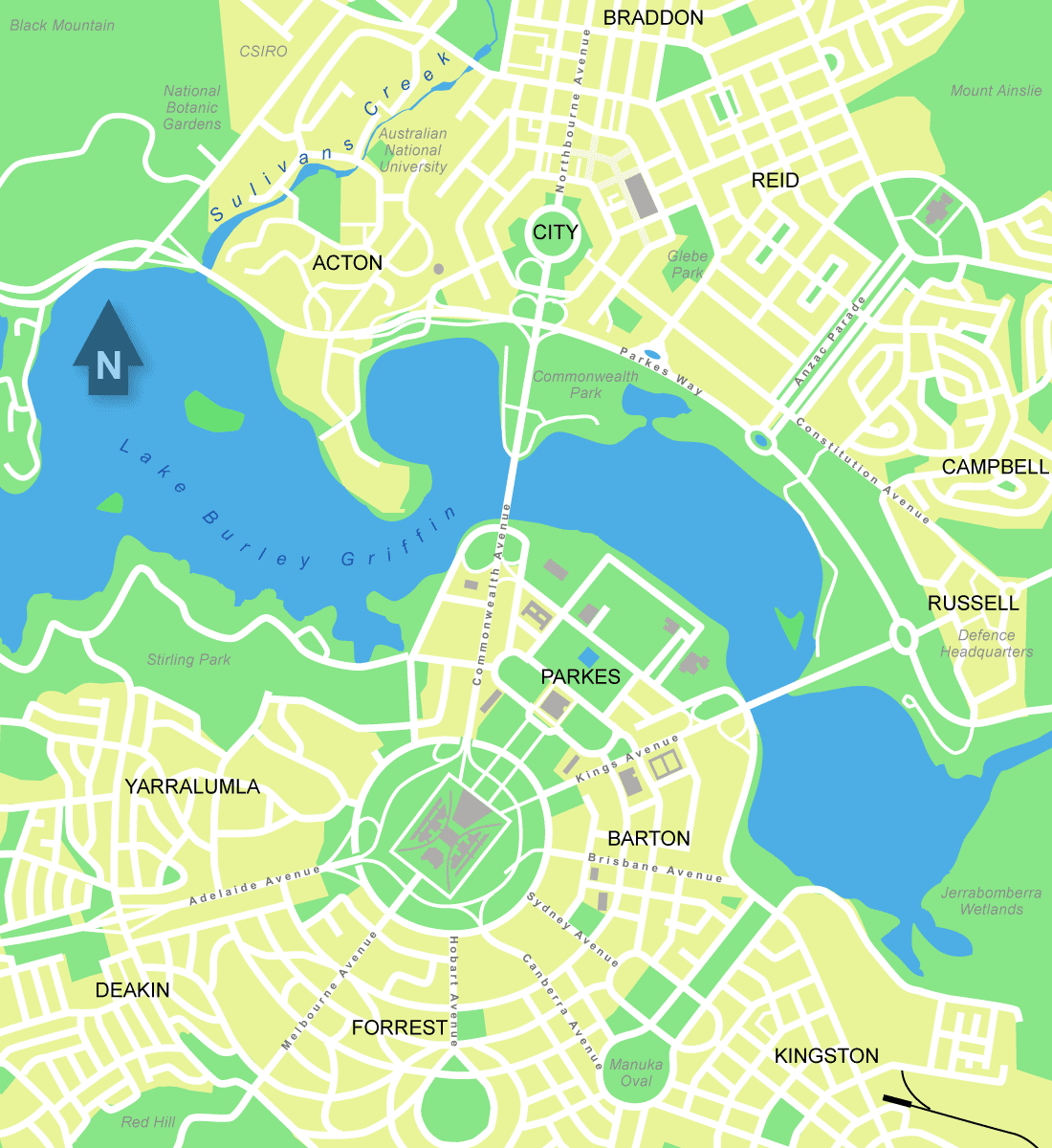
Inner Canberra demonstrates some aspects of the Griffin plan, in particular the Parliamentary Triangle.

Major settlements include the city of Canberra and the towns of Williamsdale, Oaks Estate, Uriarra, Tharwa and Hall.

The urban areas of the territory are organised into a hierarchy of districts, town centres, group centres, local suburbs as well as other industrial areas and villages. There are seven districts (with an eighth currently under construction), each of which is divided into smaller suburbs, and most of which have a town centre which is the focus of commercial and social activities. The districts were settled in the following chronological order:

- North Canberra: mostly settled in the 1920s and '30s, with expansion up to the 1960s, now 14 suburbs;
- South Canberra: settled from the 1920s to '60s, 13 suburbs;
- Woden Valley: first settled in 1963, 12 suburbs;
- Belconnen: first settled in 1967, 25 suburbs;
- Weston Creek: settled in 1969, 8 suburbs;
- Tuggeranong: settled in 1974, 19 suburbs;
- Gungahlin: settled in the early 1990s, 18 suburbs although only 15 are developed or under development;
- Molonglo Valley: first suburbs currently under construction.

The North and South Canberra districts are substantially based on Walter Burley Griffin's designs. In 1967, the then National Capital Development Commission adopted the "Y Plan" which laid out future urban development in the territory a series of central shopping and commercial area known as the 'town centres' linked by freeways, the layout of which roughly resembled the shape of the letter Y, with Tuggeranong at the base of the Y and Belconnen and Gungahlin located at the ends of the arms of the Y.

=== Ancestry and immigration ===
Country of Birth (2016)
| Birthplace (Note: In accordance with the Australian Bureau of Statistics source, England, Scotland, Mainland China and the Special Administrative Regions of Hong Kong and Macau are listed separately.) | Population |
|---|---|
| Australia | 269,682 |
| England | 12,739 |
| Mainland China | 11,334 |
| India | 10,405 |
| New Zealand | 4,722 |
| Philippines | 3,789 |
| Vietnam | 3,340 |
| United States | 2,775 |
| Sri Lanka | 2,774 |
| Malaysia | 2,431 |
| South Korea | 2,283 |

At the 2021 census, the most commonly nominated ancestries were: (Note: As a percentage of all people in that area, including those who did not state an ancestry.)

- English (32.0%)
- Australian (31.5%) (Note: The Australian Bureau of Statistics has stated that most who nominate "Australian" as their ancestry are part of the Anglo-Celtic group.)
- Irish (11.6%)
- Scottish (10.0%)
- Chinese (5.7%)
- Indian (4.5%)
- German (4.2%)
- Italian (3.3%)
- Indigenous (1.9%) (Note: Includes those identifying as having Aboriginal Australians or Torres Strait Islanders ancestry. Indigenous identification is separate to the ancestry question on the Australian Census and persons identifying as Aboriginal or Torres Strait Islander may identify any ancestry.)
- Dutch (1.7%)
- Filipino (1.6%)
- Nepalese (1.3%)
- Vietnamese (1.3%)
- Croatian (1.2%)
- Greek (1.2%)
- Polish (1.1%)

The 2021 census showed that 32.5% of territory inhabitants were born overseas. Of inhabitants born outside of Australia, the most prevalent countries of birth were India, England, China, Nepal and New Zealand.

2.0% of the population, or 8,949 people, identified as Indigenous Australians (Aboriginal Australians and Torres Strait Islanders) in 2021. (Note: Of any ancestry. Includes those identifying as Aboriginal Australians or Torres Strait Islanders. Indigenous identification is separate to the ancestry question on the Australian Census and persons identifying as Aboriginal or Torres Strait Islander may identify any ancestry.)

=== Language ===
At the 2021 census, 71.3% of people spoke only English at home. The other languages most commonly spoken at home were Mandarin (3.2%), Nepali (1.3%), Vietnamese (1.1%), Punjabi (1.1%), Hindi (1.0%).

=== Religion ===
The most common responses in the 2021 census for religion in the territory were No Religion (43.5%), Catholic (19.3%), Anglican (8.2%), Not stated (5.2%) and Hinduism (4.5%).

== Culture ==
=== Education ===
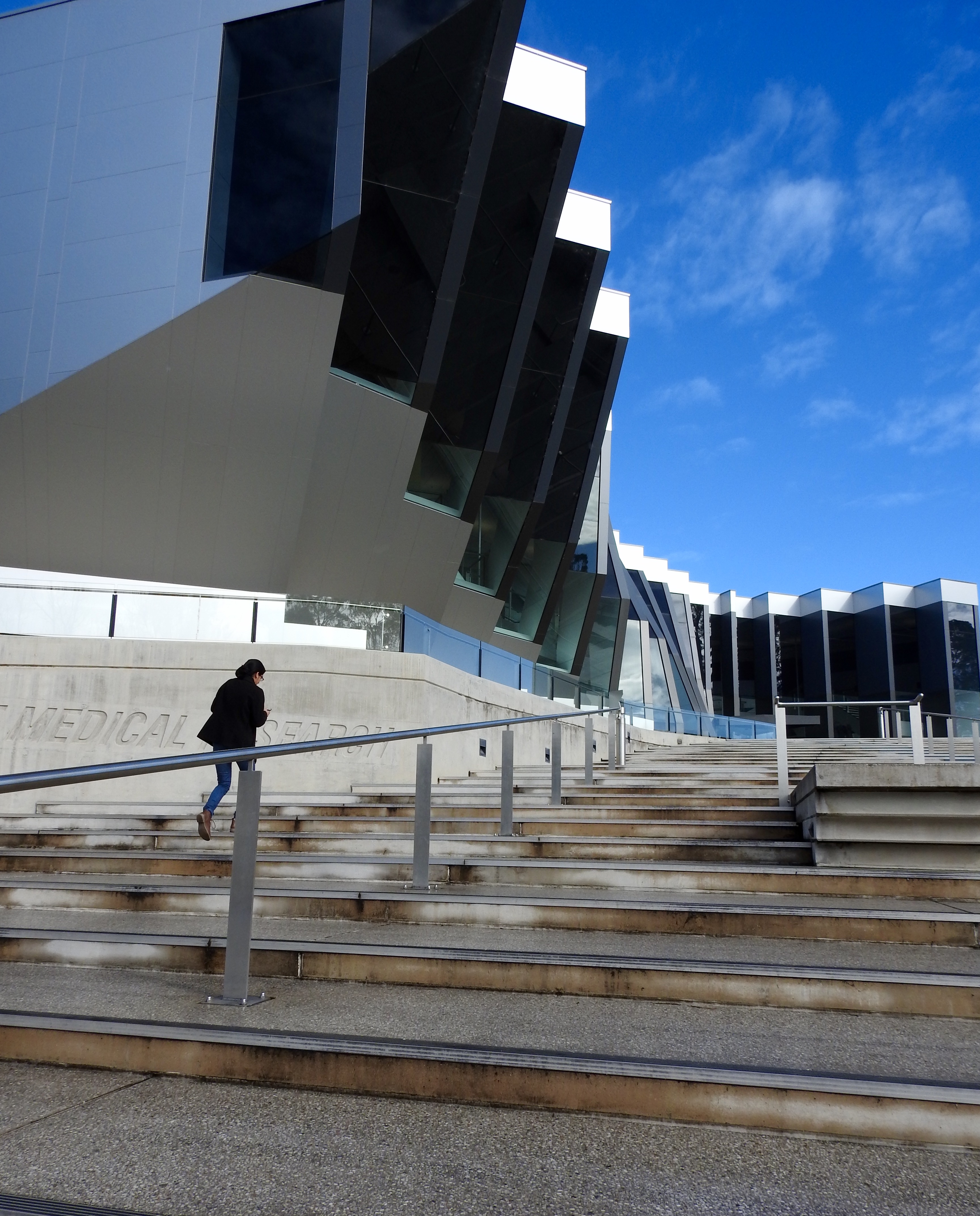
The John Curtin School of Medical Research, Australian National University

Almost all educational institutions in the territory are located within Canberra. The territory government ("public" sector) school system is mostly divided into Pre-School, Primary School (K-6), High School (7–10) and College (11–12). Many private sector high schools include years 11 and 12 and are referred to as colleges. Children are required to attend school until they turn 17 under the territory government's "Learn or Earn" policy.

In February 2005 there were 140 public and non-governmental schools in the territory; 96 operated by the government and 44 independently. In 2025, there were 83,259 students in the territory school system. 60.2% of the students were enrolled in government schools with the remaining 39.8% in non-government schools. There were 46,518 students in primary school, 24,816 in high school and 11,925 in college.

As of May 2004, 30% of people in the territory aged 15–64 had a level of educational attainment equal to at least a bachelor's degree, significantly higher than the national average of 19%. The two main tertiary institutions are the Australian National University (ANU) in Acton and the University of Canberra (UC) in Bruce. There are also two religious university campuses in Canberra: Signadou is a campus of the Australian Catholic University and St Mark's Theological College is a campus of Charles Sturt University. Tertiary level vocational education is also available through the multi-campus Canberra Institute of Technology (CIT).

The Australian Defence Force Academy (ADFA) and the Royal Military College, Duntroon (RMC) are in the suburb of Campbell in Canberra's inner northeast. ADFA teaches military undergraduates and postgraduates and is officially a campus of the University of New South Wales while Duntroon provides Australian Army Officer training.

The Academy of Interactive Entertainment (AIE) offers courses in computer game development and 3D animation.

=== Sport ===
The territory is home to a number of major professional sports league franchise teams including the ACT Brumbies (Rugby Union), Canberra United (Soccer), Canberra Raiders (Rugby League), Canberra Capitals (Basketball) and the Canberra Chill (Field Hockey). Big Bash League matches and other international cricket matches are held at the Manuka Oval. The ACT Comets (also known as the Canberra Comets) are a cricket team in the territory. The Comets are the premier team of Cricket ACT which is affiliated with Cricket Australia.

The Prime Minister's XI (Cricket), started by Robert Menzies in the 1950s and revived by Bob Hawke in 1984, has been played every year at Manuka Oval against an overseas touring team.

The Greater Western Sydney Giants (Football) play three regular season matches a year and one pre-season match in Canberra at Manuka Oval.

=== Arts and entertainment ===
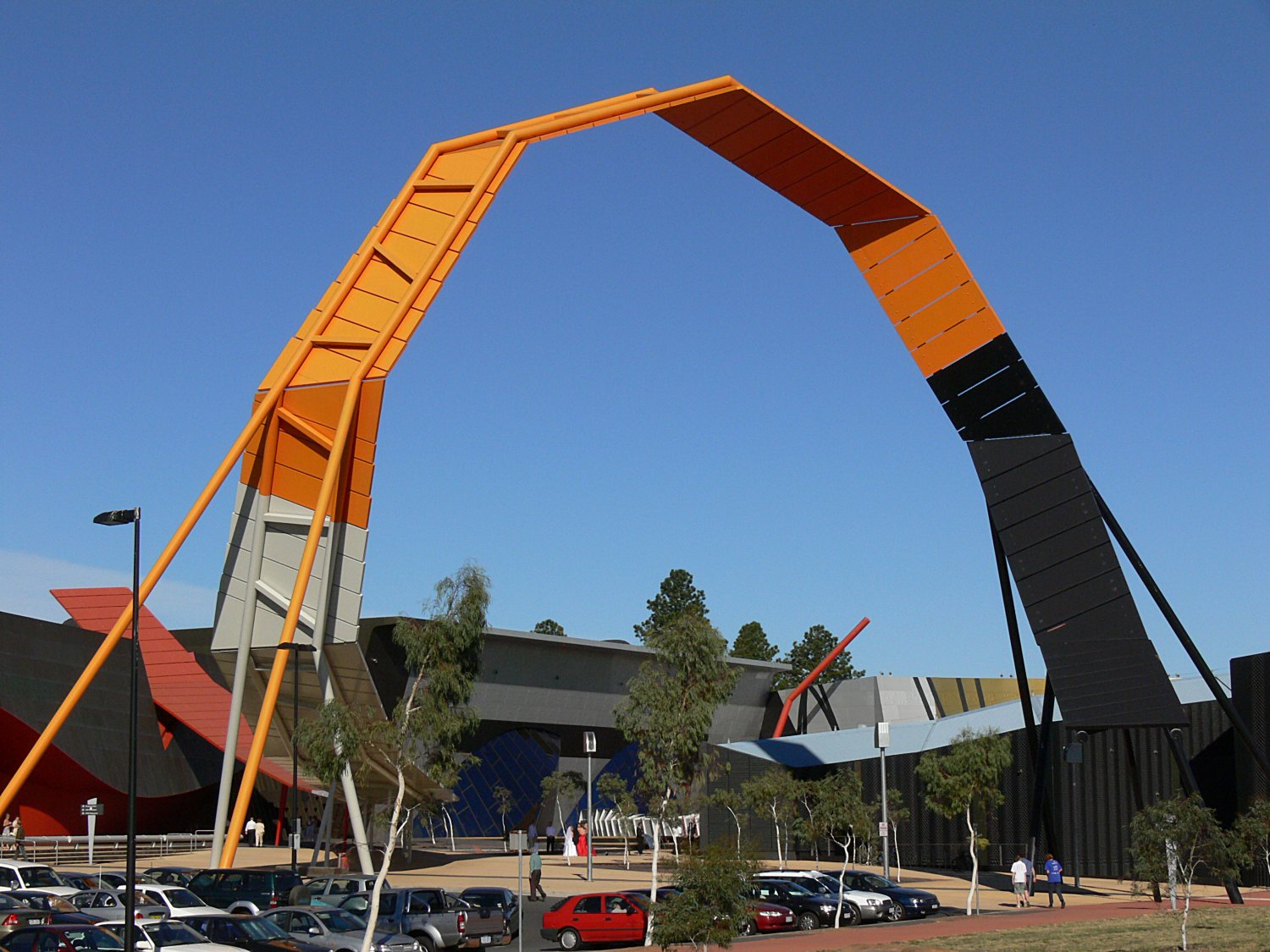
The National Museum of Australia established in 2001 records Australia's social history and is one of the territory's more architecturally daring buildings.

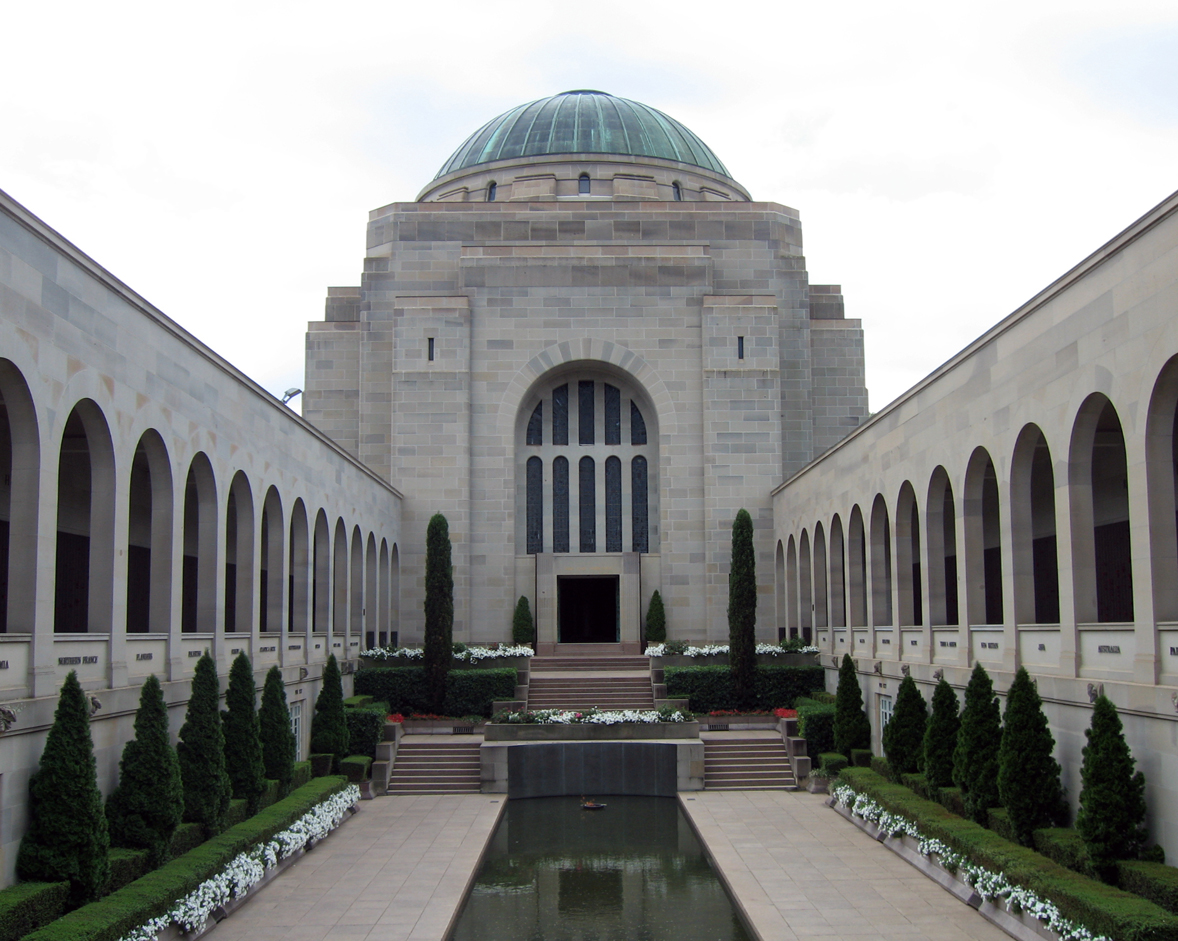
The Australian War Memorial

The territory is home to many national monuments and institutions such as the Australian War Memorial, the National Gallery of Australia, the National Portrait Gallery, the National Library, the National Archives, the Australian Academy of Science, the National Film and Sound Archive and the National Museum. Many Commonwealth government buildings in the territory are open to the public, including Parliament House, the High Court and the Royal Australian Mint.

Lake Burley Griffin is the site of the Captain James Cook Memorial and the National Carillon. Other sites of interest include the Telstra Tower, the Australian National Botanic Gardens, the National Zoo and Aquarium, the National Dinosaur Museum and Questacon – the National Science and Technology Centre.

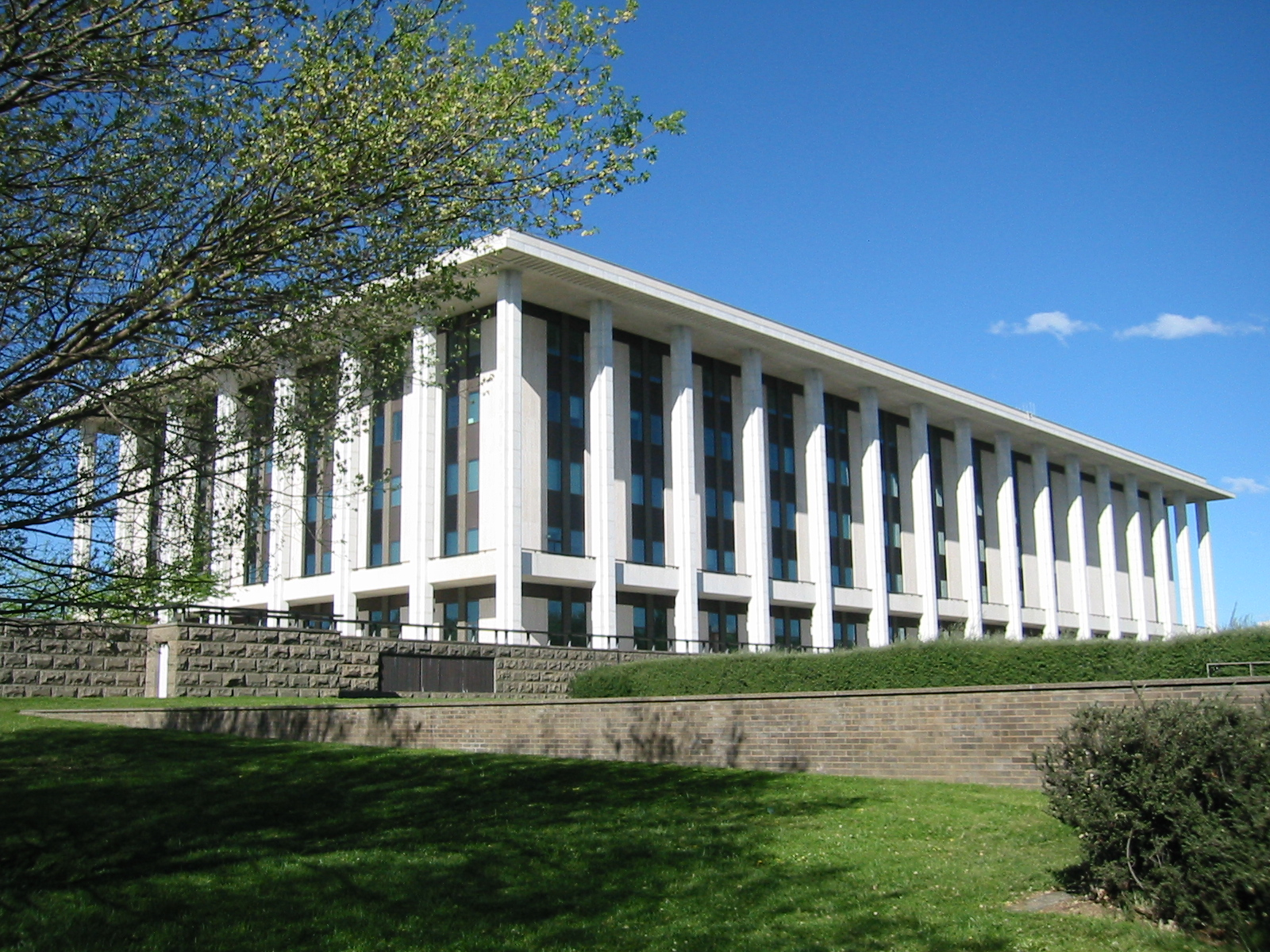
A copy of every book published in Australia is required by law to be held by the National Library of Australia.

The Canberra Museum and Gallery in the city is a repository of local history and art, housing a permanent collection and visiting exhibitions. Several historic homes are open to the public: Lanyon and Tuggeranong Homesteads in the Tuggeranong Valley, Mugga-Mugga in Symonston, and Blundells' Cottage in Parkes all display the lifestyle of the early European settlers. Calthorpes' House in Red Hill is a well-preserved example of a 1920s house from Canberra's very early days.

The territory has many venues for live music and theatre: the Canberra Theatre and Playhouse which hosts many major concerts and productions; and Llewellyn Hall (within the ANU School of Music), a world-class concert hall are two of the most notable. The Albert Hall was Canberra's first performing arts venue, opened in 1928. It was the original performance venue for theatre groups such as the Canberra Repertory Society.

There are numerous bars and nightclubs which also offer live entertainment, particularly concentrated in the areas of Dickson, Kingston and the city. Most town centres have facilities for a community theatre and a cinema, and all have a library. Popular cultural events include the National Folk Festival, the Royal Canberra Show, the Summernats car festival, Enlighten festival and the National Multicultural Festival in February.

=== Media ===
The territory has a daily newspaper, The Canberra Times, which was established in 1926. There are also several free weekly publications, including news magazines City News and Canberra Weekly.

Major Australian metropolitan newspapers such as the Daily Telegraph and Sydney Morning Herald from Sydney, The Age and Herald Sun from Melbourne as well as national publications The Australian and the Australian Financial Review are also available.

There are a number of AM and FM stations broadcasting throughout the territory (AM/FM Listing). The main commercial operators are the Capital Radio Network (2CA and 2CC), and Southern Cross Austereo/ARN Media (Hit 104.7 and Mix 106.3). There are also several community operated stations as well as the local and national stations of the Australian Broadcasting Corporation.

A DAB+ digital radio trial is also in operation, it simulcasts some of the AM/FM stations, and also provides several digital only stations (DAB+ Trial Listing).

Five free-to-air television stations service the territory:

- ABC Canberra (ABC)
- SBS New South Wales/Australian Capital Territory (SBS)
- WIN Television Southern NSW & ACT (WIN) – Nine Network affiliate
- Prime7 Southern NSW & ACT (CBN) – A Seven Network owned & operated station, Seven Network affiliate
- Southern Cross 10 Southern NSW & ACT (CTC) – Network 10 affiliate

Each station broadcasts a primary channel and several multichannels.

Pay television services are available from Foxtel (via satellite) and telecommunications company TransACT (via cable).

== Infrastructure ==
=== Health ===
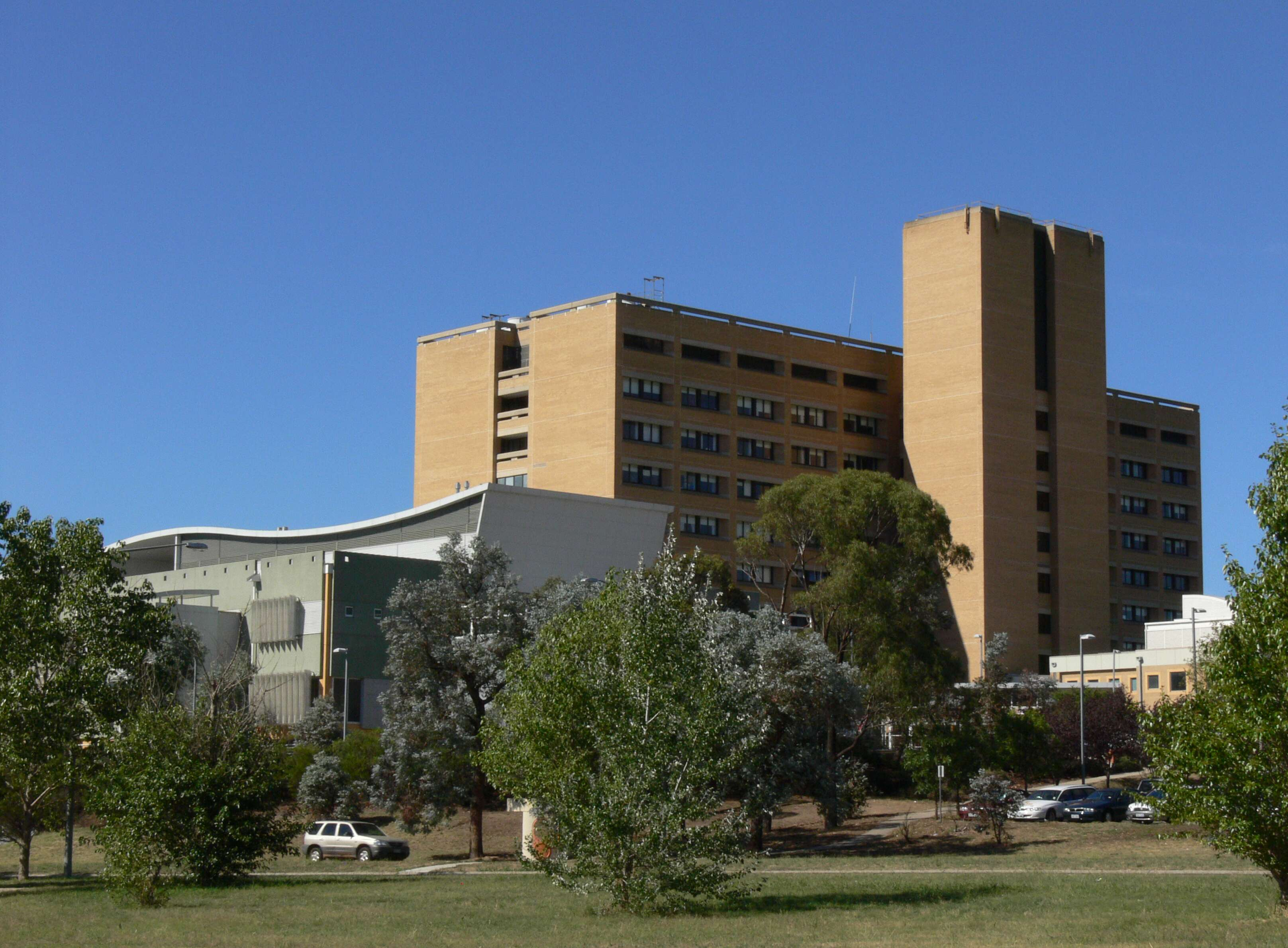
The Canberra Hospital

The territory has two large public hospitals both located in Canberra: the approximately 600-bed Canberra Hospital in Garran and the 174-bed Calvary Public Hospital in Bruce. In addition, the University of Canberra Hospital provides a 140-bed rehabilitation centre. All three are also teaching institutions. The largest private hospital is the Calvary John James Hospital in Deakin. Calvary Private Hospital in Bruce and Healthscope's National Capital Private Hospital in Garran are also major healthcare providers.

The territory has 10 aged care facilities. Territory hospitals receive emergency cases from throughout southern New South Wales, and ACT Ambulance Service is one of four operational agencies of the ACT Emergency Services Authority. NETS provides a dedicated ambulance service for inter-hospital transport of sick newborns within the ACT and into surrounding New South Wales.

=== Transport ===
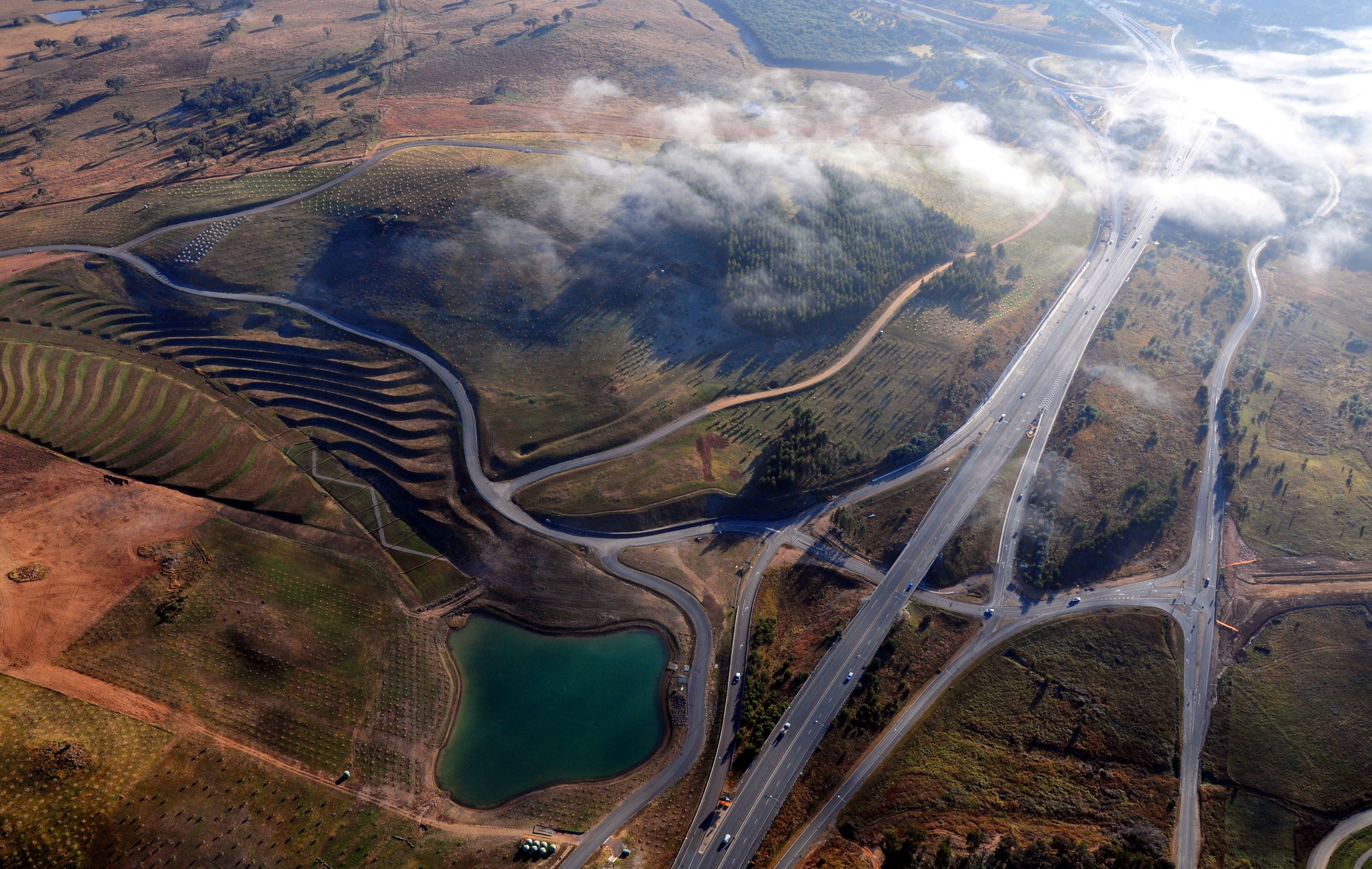
Aerial view of Tuggeranong Parkway, a major highway which links Canberra's city centre with Tuggeranong

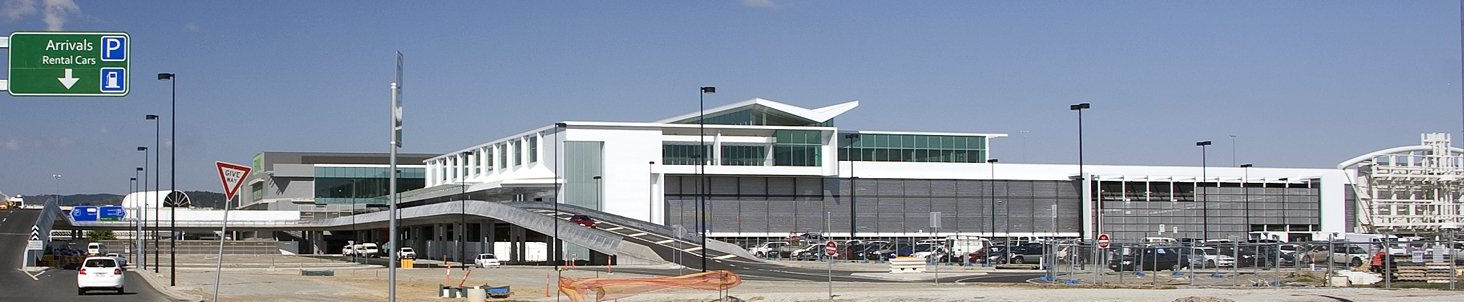
Canberra Airport terminal

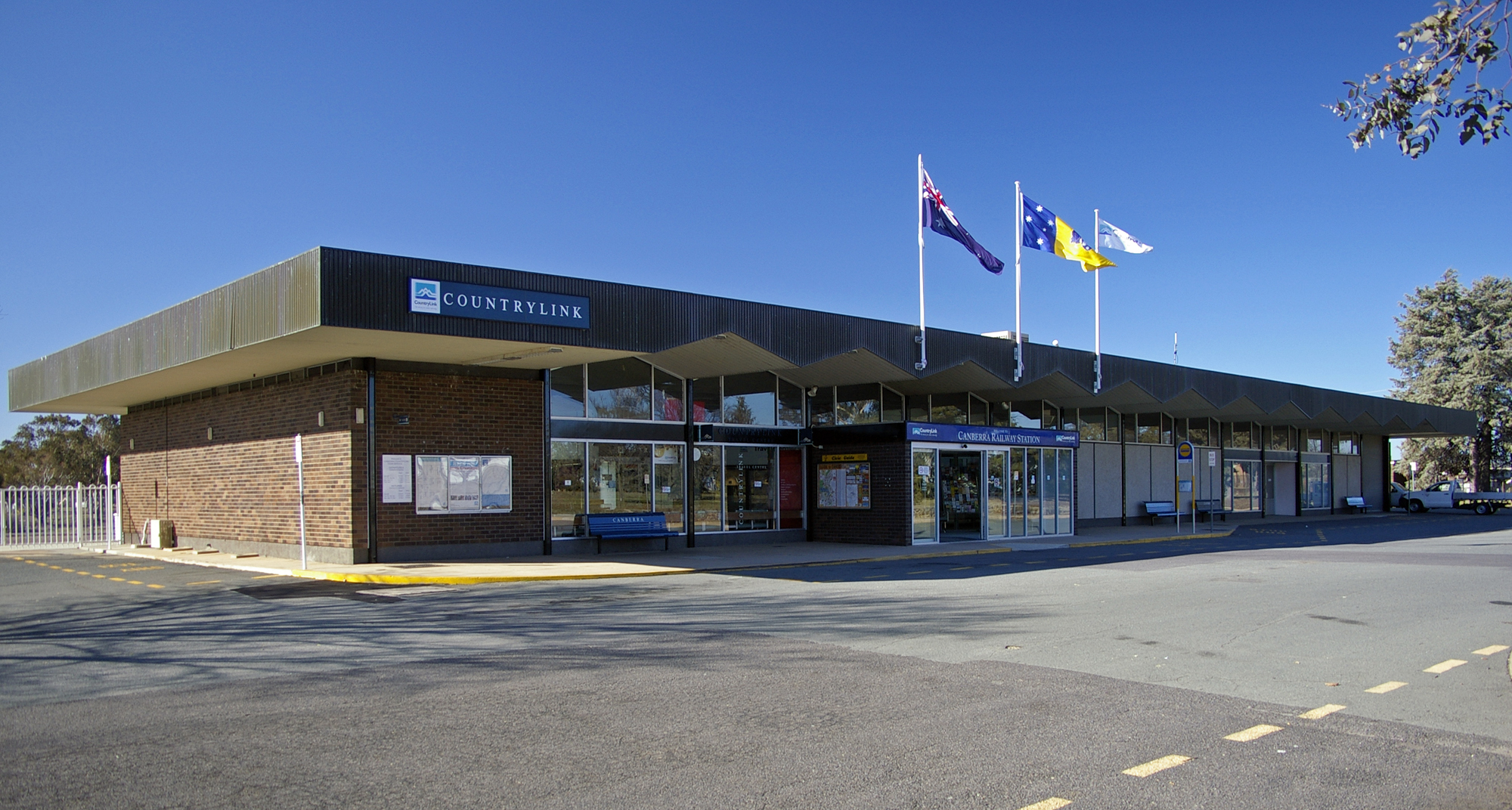
Canberra railway station

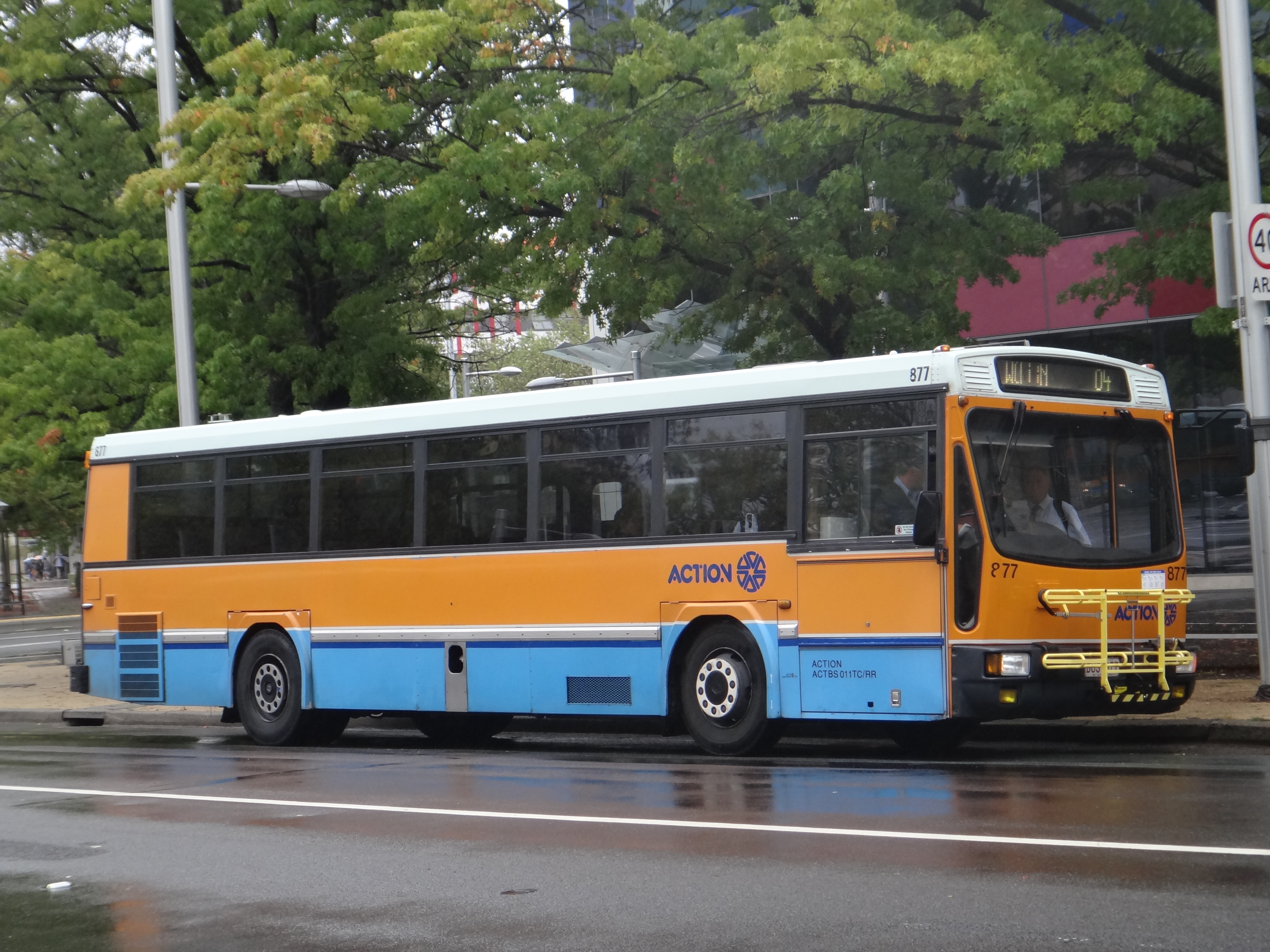
ACTION Ansair bodied Renault PR100.2

The automobile is by far the dominant form of transport in the territory. The city is laid out so that arterial roads connecting inhabited clusters run through undeveloped areas of open land or forest, which results in a low population density; this also means that idle land is available for the development of future transport corridors if necessary without the need to build tunnels or acquire developed residential land. In contrast, other capital cities in Australia have substantially less green space.

Suburbs of Canberra are generally connected by parkways—limited access dual carriageway roads with speed limits generally set at a maximum of 100 km/h (62 mph). An example is the Tuggeranong Parkway which links Canberra's CBD and Tuggeranong, and bypasses Weston Creek. In most districts, discrete residential suburbs are bounded by main arterial roads with only a few residential linking in, to deter non-local traffic from cutting through areas of housing.

ACTION, the government-operated bus service, provides public transport route services in the territory. CDC Canberra provides bus services between the territory and nearby areas of New South Wales (Murrumbateman and Yass) and as Qcity Transit (Queanbeyan). A light rail line that opened in April 2019 links the CBD with the northern district of Gungahlin. At the 2016 census, 7.1% of the journeys to work involved public transport while 4.5% were on foot.

There are two local taxi companies. Aerial Capital Group enjoyed monopoly status until the arrival of Cabxpress in 2007. In October 2015, the territory government passed legislation to regulate ride sharing, allowing ride share services including Uber to operate legally in the territory. The territory government was the first jurisdiction in Australia to enact legislation to regulate the service.

An interstate NSW TrainLink railway service connects Canberra to Sydney. Canberra's railway station is in the inner south suburb of Kingston. Train services to Melbourne are provided by way of a NSW TrainLink bus service which connects with a rail service between Sydney and Melbourne in Yass, about a one-hour drive from Canberra.

Canberra is about three hours by road from Sydney on the Federal Highway (National Highway 23), which connects with the Hume Highway (National Highway 31) near Goulburn, and seven hours by road from Melbourne on the Barton Highway (National Highway 25), which joins the Hume Highway at Yass. It is a two-hour drive on the Monaro Highway (National Highway 23) to the ski fields of the Snowy Mountains and the Kosciuszko National Park. Batemans Bay, a popular holiday spot on the New South Wales coast, is also two hours away via the Kings Highway.

Canberra Airport provides direct domestic services to Sydney, Melbourne, Newcastle, Brisbane, Adelaide, Gold Coast, Hobart and Perth, with connections to other domestic centres. Regular direct international flights operate to Nadi in Fiji. Canberra Airport is, as of September 2013, designated by the Australian Government Department of Infrastructure and Regional Development as a restricted use designated international airport. Until 2003, the civilian airport shared runways with RAAF Base Fairbairn. In June of that year, the Air Force base was decommissioned and from that time the airport was fully under civilian control.

=== Utilities ===
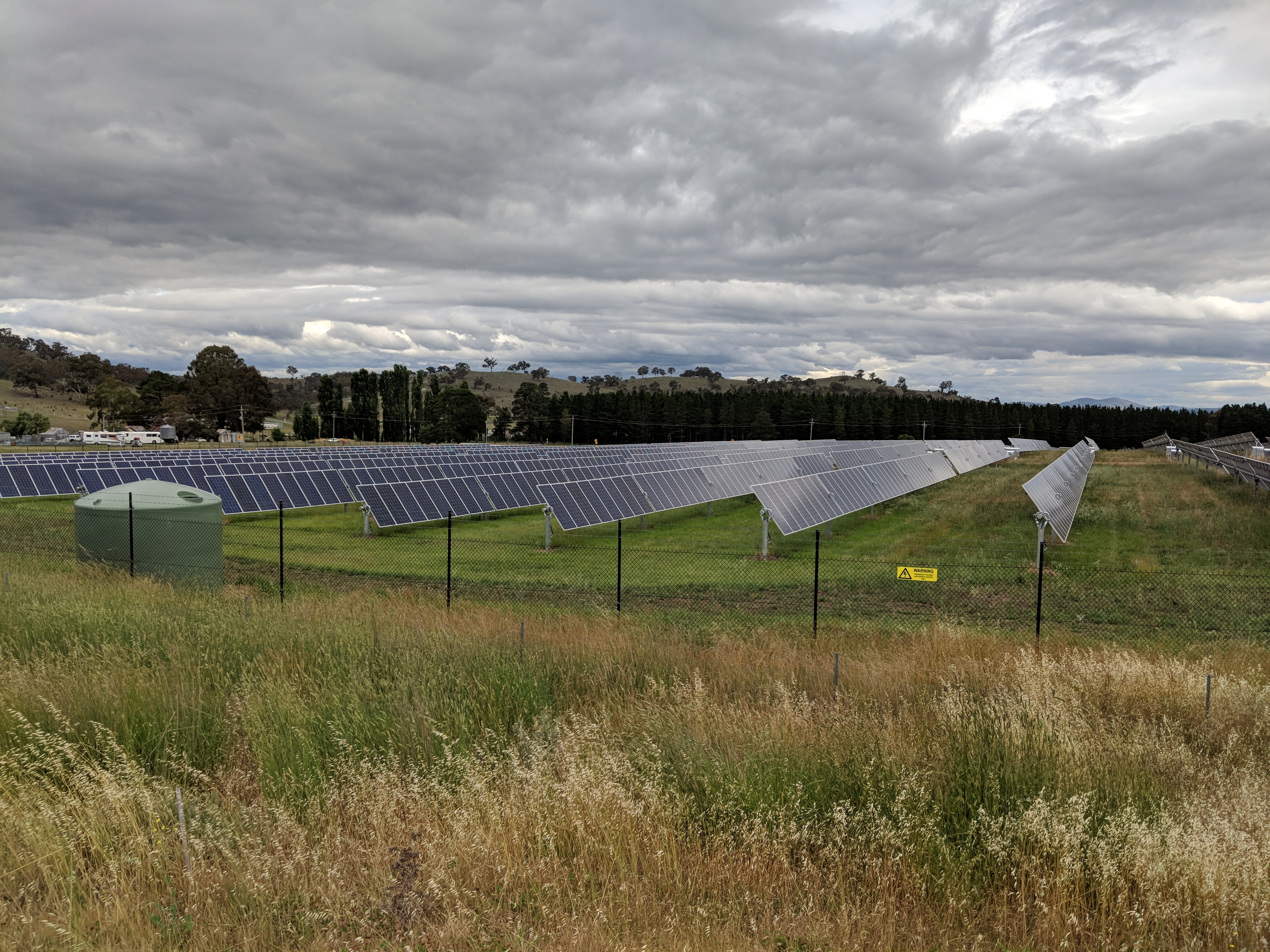
The Mount Majura Solar Farm has a rated output of 2.3 megawatts and was opened on 6 October 2016.

The government-owned Icon Water, formerly ACTEW, manages the territory's water and sewerage infrastructure. ActewAGL is a joint venture between Icon and AGL and is a retail provider of territory utility services including water, natural gas, electricity, and also some telecommunications services via a subsidiary TransACT.

The territory's water reservoirs are the Corin, Bendora and Cotter dams on the Cotter River and the Googong Dam on the Queanbeyan River. Although the Googong Dam is located in New South Wales, it is managed by the territory government. Icon Water owns the territory's two wastewater treatment plants, located at Fyshwick and on the lower reaches of the Molonglo River.

Electricity for the territory mainly comes from the national power grid through substations at Holt and Fyshwick (via Queanbeyan). Power was first supplied from a thermal plant built in 1913, near the Molonglo River, but this was finally closed in 1957. The ACT has four solar farms, which were opened between 2014 and 2017: Royalla (rated output of 20 megawatts, 2014), Mount Majura (2.3 MW, 2016), Mugga Lane (13 MW, 2017) and Williamsdale (11 MW, 2017). In addition numerous houses in Canberra have photovoltaic panels or solar hot water systems. In 2015 and 2016, rooftop solar systems supported by the territory government's feed-in tariff had a capacity of 26.3 megawatts, producing 34,910 MWh. In the same year, retailer-supported schemes had a capacity of 25.2 megawatts and exported 28,815 MWh to the grid (power consumed locally was not recorded).

The territory has the highest rate with internet access at home (94 per cent of households in 2014–15).

== Economy ==
Economic activity in the territory is heavily concentrated around the city of Canberra.

A stable housing market, steady employment and rapid population growth in the 21st century have led to economic prosperity and, in 2011, CommSec ranked the territory as the second best performing state or territory in the country. This trend continued into 2016, when the territory was ranked the third best performing out of all of Australia's states and territories.

In 2017–18, the territory had the fastest rate of growth in the nation due to a rapid growth in population, a strongly performing higher education sector as well as a significant housing and infrastructure investment.

Higher education is the territory's largest export industry. The territory is home to a significant number of universities and higher education providers. The other major services exports of the territory in 2017–18 were government services and personal travel. The major goods exports of the territory in 2017–18 were gold coin, legal tender coin, metal structures and fish, though these represent a small proportion of the economy compared to services exports.

The economy of the territory is largely dependent on the public sector with 30% of the jobs in the territory being in the public sector. Decisions by the federal government regarding the public service can have a significant impact on the territory's economy.

The territory's gross state product in 2017–18 was $39.8 billion which represented 2.2% of the gross domestic product of Australia. In 2017–18 the territory economy grew by 4.0 per cent, the highest growth rate of any jurisdiction in Australia. This brought real economic growth over the three years to June 2018 to 12 per cent.

== See also ==
- List of buildings and structures in the Australian Capital Territory
- ACT Corrective Services
- Human Rights Act 2004
- Jervis Bay Territory
- Revenue stamps of the Australian Capital Territory

== Bibliography ==
- The Penguin Australia Road Atlas. Ringwood, Victoria: Penguin Books Australia. 2000. ISBN 0-670-88980-6.
- UBD Canberra. North Ryde, New South Wales: Universal Publishers. 2007. ISBN 978-0-7319-1882-9.
- Vaisutis, Justine (2009). Australia. Footscray, Victoria: Lonely Planet. ISBN 978-1-74179-160-0.
