= List of electoral divisions in the Australian Capital Territory =

Results of the 2022 federal election

The Australian Capital Territory, an internal territory of Australia, is divided into 3 electoral divisions for the purposes of electing the Australian House of Representatives. At the 2025 federal election the Australian Labor Party won all three seats in the territory.

== Divisions ==
Name	Formed	Size (km^{2})	Classification	Current Member	Member's Party	Reference
Bean (Note: Also includes Norfolk Island)	2019	1,913	Inner-metropolitan	David Smith	Labor	
Canberra	1974	312	Inner-metropolitan	Alicia Payne	Labor	
Fenner (Note: Also includes the Jervis Bay Territory)	2016	238	Inner-metropolitan	Andrew Leigh	Labor	

== See also ==
- Australian Capital Territory Legislative Assembly
