= 1978 Australian Capital Territory self-government referendum =

- 25 November 1978
- Proposal A: That self-government be granted to the Australian Capital Territory by delegating functions to a locally elected legislative body in the stages set out in the statement, published in the Commonwealth of Australia Gazette on 24 October 1978, for the purposes of sub-section 43(1) of the Referendum (Self-government) Ordinance 1978. Proposal B: That a locally elected legislative body be established in the Australian Capital Territory with local government-type legislative and executive functions. Proposal C: That the present arrangements for governing the Australian Capital Territory should continue for the time being.

Results
Choice	Votes	%
Present arrangements	69,893	63.75%
Self-government	33,480	30.54%
Local government	6,268	5.72%
Valid votes	109,641	98.31%
Invalid or blank votes	1,888	1.69%
Total votes	111,529	100.00%
Registered voters/turnout	130,522	85.45%

A referendum was held on 25 November 1978, asking voters in the Australian Capital Territory (ACT) whether the territory should be granted self-governance.

Three options were presented − Proposal A ("self-government"), Proposal B ("local government") and Proposal C ("present arrangements").

== Campaign ==
According to future MLA Wayne Berry, many residents saw the establishment of self-government as a cost-cutting exercise.

== Result ==
The election was conducted using preferential voting, with voters numbering all options in the order of their preferred governance model. Voting was compulsory. The proposal required 50% (plus 1) of the vote to pass.

63.8% of ACT voters chose to support the present arrangements, compared to 30.5% for self-government and 5.7% for local government. As a result, no change was made to the governing structure. The ACT was later granted self-governance in 1989.

=== Result by federal electorate ===
Residents of the Jervis Bay Territory, which was part of the federal electorate of Fraser at the time, were not eligible to vote in the referendum.

Electorate	Enrolled voters	A (SG)		B (LG)		C (PA)		Informal		Turnout	
Electorate	Enrolled voters	Votes	%	Votes	%	Votes	%	Votes	%	Total	%
Canberra	64,538	15,721	28.92	3,227	5.93	35,394	65.13	888	1.60	55,230	85.57
Fraser	65,984	17,759	32.11	3,041	5.49	34,499	62.38	1,000	1.77	56,299	85.32
Total	130,522	33,480	30.54	6,268	5.72	69,893	63.75	1,888	1.69	111,529	85.44

== Endorsements ==
=== Proposal A (self-government) ===
==== Political parties ====
- ACT Labor Party
- ACT Liberal Party
- Australian Democrats

==== Organisations ====
- Council of Social Services of the ACT

==== Individuals ====
- All 18 members of the ACT Legislative Assembly
- Sir Billy Snedden (Federal Liberal MP and Speaker of the House of Representatives)

=== Proposal B (local government) ===
==== Individuals ====
- John Haslem (Federal Liberal MP for Canberra)
- John Knight (Liberal senator for the ACT)

=== Proposal C (present arrangements) ===
==== Organisations ====
- No Change for Canberra Committee

==== Individuals ====
- Adrian Howie (ACT Liberal Party financial director)
- Tony Rothewell (ACT Liberal Party campaign director)

=== No support for any proposal ===
==== Organisations ====
- ACT Sports Council

== Opinion polling ==
=== Voting intention ===
Date	Firm	Interview mode	Sample size	Voting intention			
Date	Firm	Interview mode	Sample size	A (SG)	B (LG)	C (PA)	UND
25 November 1978	1978 referendum	—	130,522	30.54%	5.49%	63.75%	—
September—October 1978	ANU Survey Research Centre		491	24.0%	24.5%	44%	7.5%
