= Enlighten Canberra =

Outdoor annual art and cultural festival

- Genre: Exhibition
- Begins: March 2026
- Frequency: Annual
- Location: Canberra
- Coordinates: 35.3081°S 149.1244°E
- Years active: 13
- Inaugurated: 2011
- Most recent: 28 February-10 March 2025
- Attendance: 287,874 (2015)
- Budget: $5.3 million over four years (2011 to 2014)
- Website: www.enlightencanberra.com.au

Enlighten Canberra is an outdoor annual art and cultural festival held in Canberra, Australia featuring illuminating light installations and projections, performances from local and interstate musicians, a short film festival and the Canberra Balloon Spectacular.

The festival is an Australian Capital Territory (ACT) Government initiative held annually in early March, encouraging people to "See Canberra in a whole new light." The centrepiece of Enlighten Canberra is the illuminating of Canberra's cultural institutions after dark, including Old Parliament House, Parliament House and the National Gallery of Australia (since the 2011 event) as well as the National Portrait Gallery and Questacon (since the 2012 event). There is also live music, film screenings and after-hours tours.

Since its inception, Enlighten has become increasingly popular, attracting 115,000 visitors in 2013 and 131,500 in 2014. Attendance rose again in 2015, to 287,874 visitors.

== History of the event ==
=== 2008–11: Lead-up to the first Enlighten ===
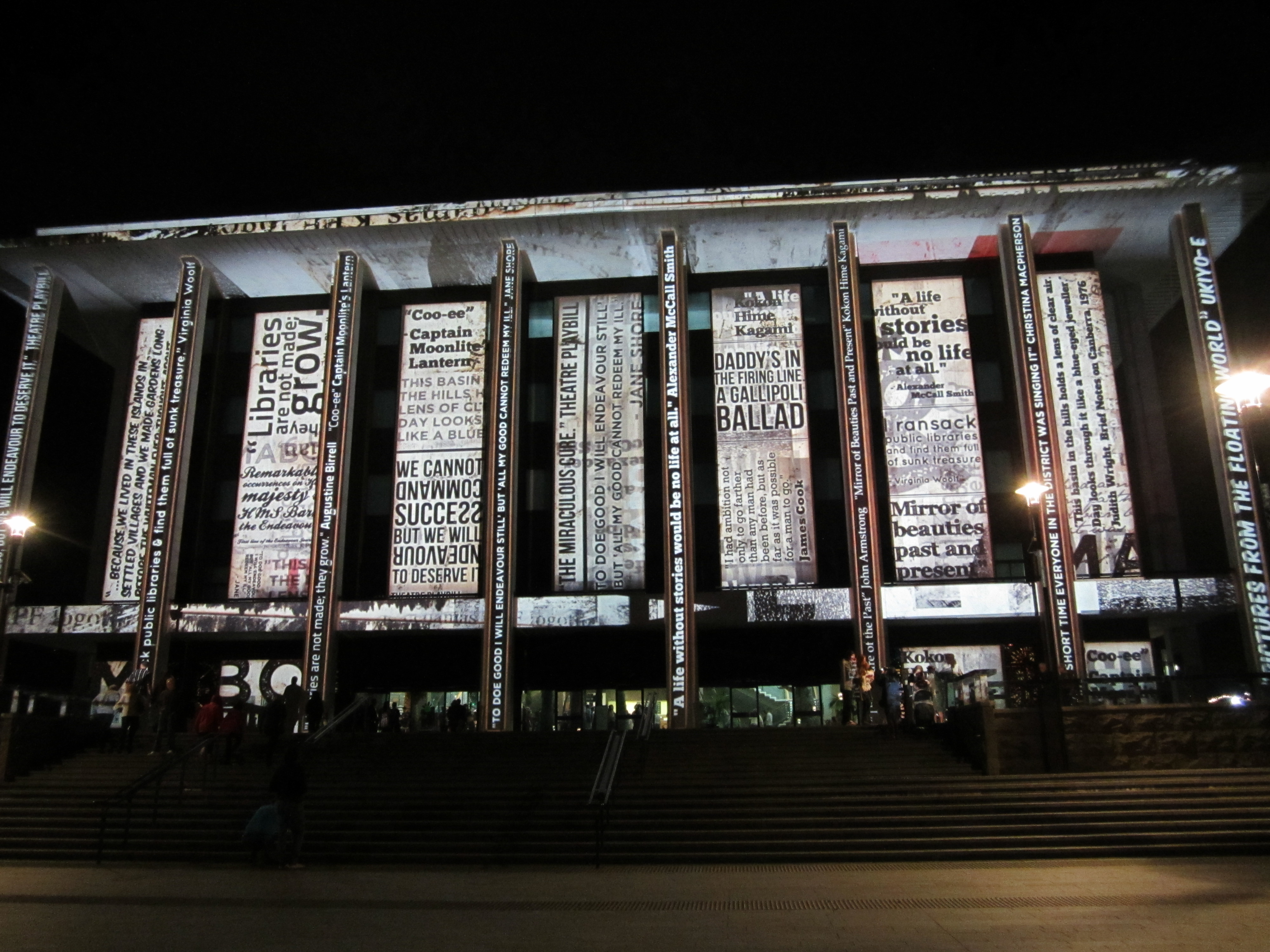
A projection on the National Library of Australia during the 2012 Enlighten festival

In 2008 ACT Labor made an election promise to deliver a new autumn event for Canberra, Australia—this was the beginnings of Enlighten Canberra. In December 2010, Australian Capital Territory (ACT) Minister for Tourism, Sport and Recreation Andrew Barr, announced the ACT Government Enlighten would be a major annual event, commencing in March 2011. He said national attractions that would participate with lit facades after dark included the National Gallery of Australia, Parliament House and Old Parliament House. Ticketed events were also announced, including headline international acts in concert.

=== 2011: The first Enlighten ===
In its first year, along with other events, Enlighten hosted rock band INXS, jazz guitarist George Benson, and world-music supergroup Afro Celt Sound System. To help promote Enlighten, INXS arrived in Canberra in a helicopter, landing on the lawns of Old Parliament House two weeks before their concert appearance. INXS band member Kirk Pengilly told reporters that the show planned for Enlighten 2011 was "probably the biggest production that we've put on at any show in Australia." As part of the festival, cultural institutions in the Parliamentary triangle were illuminated after dark, including Old Parliament House, Parliament House and the National Gallery of Australia.

Despite the big-ticket performances and media stunts, the inaugural festival cost $2.4 million, and there was poor community interest, with just 8600 visitors. The first Enlighten did however attract 2400 visitors from interstate or overseas who came to Canberra specifically for Enlighten or extended their stay because of it.

The slogan for Enlighten, announced in December 2010, is "See Canberra in a whole new light"

=== 2012: Enlighten made a part of the Canberra Festival ===
In its second year, Enlighten was made a part of the Canberra Festival. The merging of the festivals was met with criticism from the Canberra branch of the Liberal Party of Australia, with Canberra Liberal Brendan Smyth describing the Labor Government's attempt to create a new festival as "embarrassing". The Enlighten entertainment lineup featured in the 2012 event was scaled back significantly from the 2011 event to instead feature local Canberra artists including Owen Campbell. Of the nearly 100 artists contracted to perform in the 2012 festival, 53 per cent were local artists, paid 11.5 per cent of the Enlighten programming budget that year. In 2012 Questacon and the National Portrait Gallery became canvasses for projection for the first time—they had not been lit in the 2011 Enlighten festival.

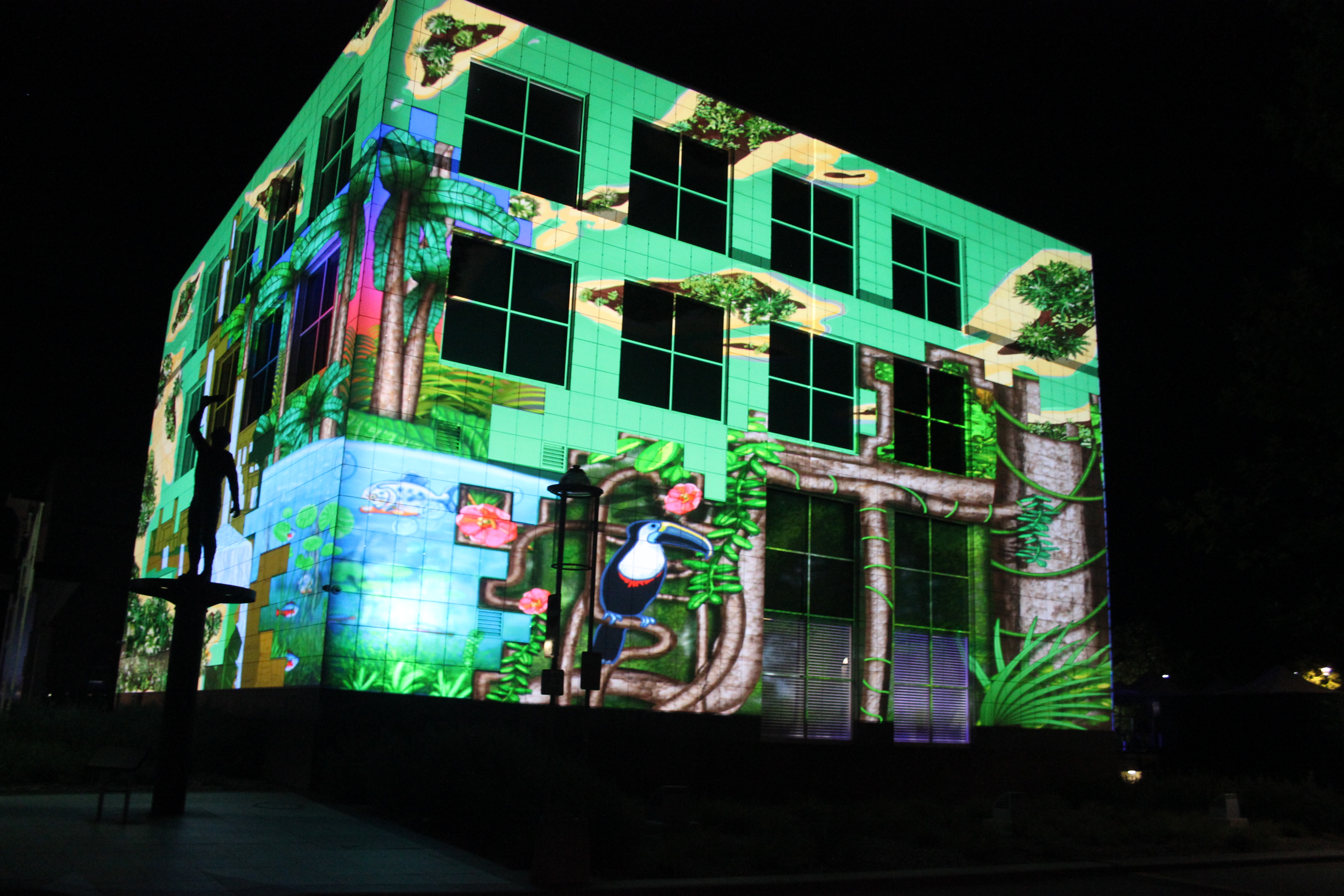
A 2014 Enlighten projection on Questacon

=== 2013–14: the spiegeltent joins Enlighten ===
In 2013, along with the large-scale building illuminations featured in the previous two events, Enlighten hosted a spiegeltent for the first time. The tent put on dozens of shows featuring comics, acrobats and musicians. The festival also included Canberra's first Dîner en Blanc, a pop-up picnic in which all guests dress in white and bring their own food, table, table-setting and chair. More than 700 people attended the picnic, the third Dîner en Blanc to be held in Australia. Dîner en Blanc was repeated in 2014, with over 800 people attending, but the dinner was not included as part of Enlighten 2015. Film screenings and after hours tours were also offered, and American soul singer Charles Bradley performed as part of the 2014 festival.

=== 2015–16: Enlighten debuts the Night Noodle Markets in Canberra ===
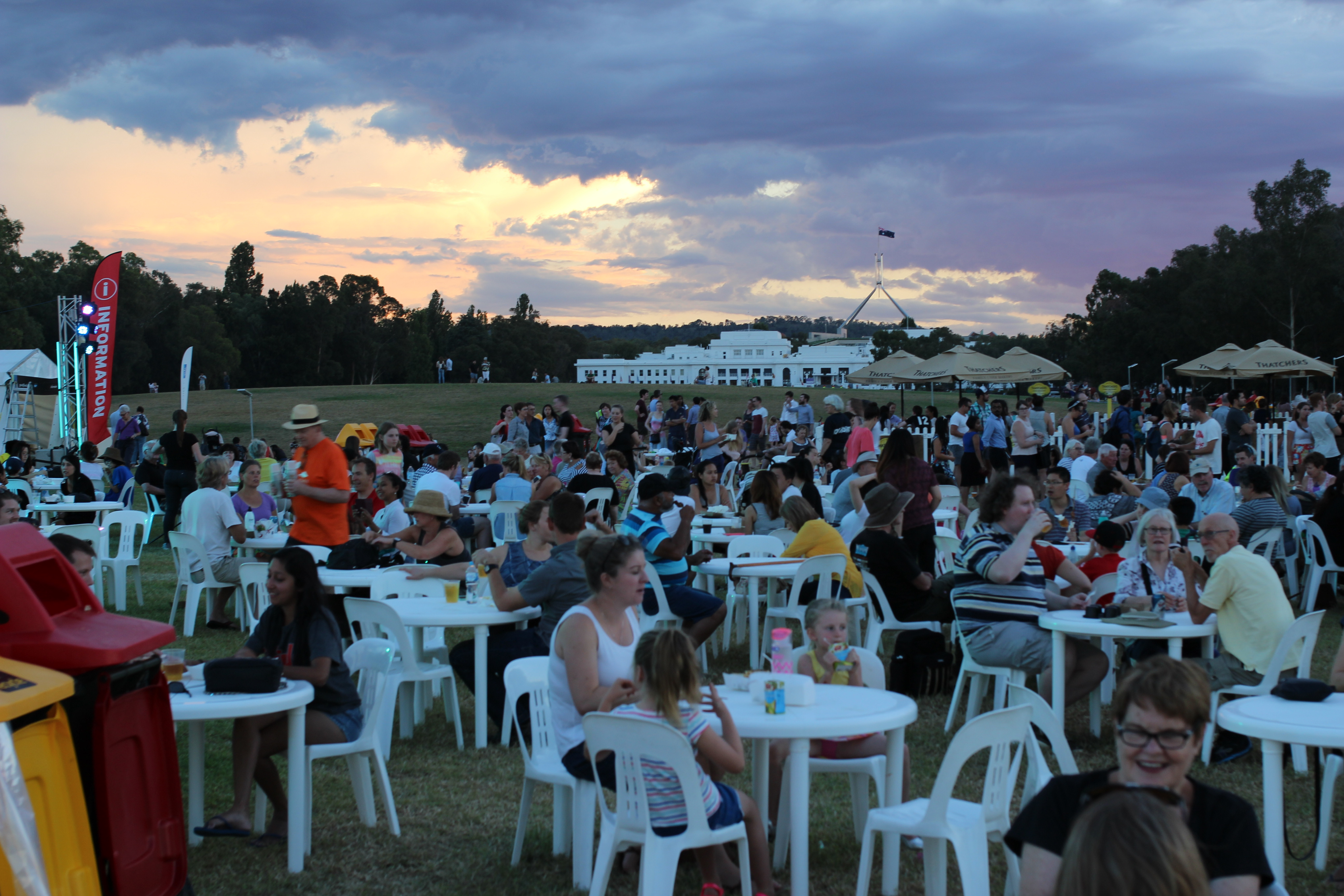
Visitors to the 2016 Enlighten Night Noodle Markets, in the lawns to the north of Old Parliament House.

In November 2014, the ACT Government announced the Night Noodle Markets would be coming to Canberra during the Enlighten Festival in 2015. The Night Noodle Markets feature Asian-themed street-food vendors. ACT Tourism Minister Andrew Barr told media that Canberra's Night Noodle Markets were expected to host up to 25 hawker style food stalls, and that the ACT Government had committed $200,000 to bring the 2015 noodle markets to the city. Around 156,000 peoples visited the inaugural Enlighten Night Noodle Markets—of whom 24,000 visited on the opening night, far exceeding expectations.

In 2016, alongside the Night Noodle Markets, Enlighten featured an installation by Amanda Parer of five illuminated white rabbits standing at 7 metres (23 ft). Parer described the rabbits as metaphors for the mismanagement of the environment. Free concerts held over the consecutive weekends featured indie rock Australian band Augie March and American alternative country musical group Calexico.

Ahead of the 2016 ACT election the Labor party committed to spend $3.72 million to continue Enlighten in 2017, 2018 and 2019.

=== 2020–21: Pandemic ===
Enlighten in 2020 just missed the start of the COVID-19 pandemic in Australia. It still went ahead in 2021, under some restrictions as most events and installations were ticketed and required online pre-registration to allow contact tracing. The Night Noodle Markets were not held, replaced by Late Night Treats. The Skyfire fireworks show was also cancelled that year.

== Criticism ==
Enlighten has come under severe criticism in the Australian media for not paying professional artists for their work and labor producing installations and artworks (despite being a well-funded government festival). For the 2020 festival the EOI proposal request published on Artshub and Visabel suggests four remuneration options to artists, three of which indicate artists should fully self-fund, partially self-fund or find sponsorship for exhibition of their own work. One indicates that the festival will pay for some projects but stresses a very limited budget for artworks.

== Projections ==
For its first six years, the large-scale projections for Enlighten were coordinated by Electric Canvas. Electric Canvas's managing director Peter Milne has also worked on the 2000 Sydney Olympic Games and the 2006 Melbourne Commonwealth Games.

== Budget, attendance and visitor expenditure ==
Since its inception, Enlighten has become increasingly popular, attracting 115,000 visitors in 2013 and 131,500 in 2014. Attendance rose again in 2015, to 287,874 visitors.

Enlighten attendance, budget and visitor expenditure
Year	Dates	Attendance	Event budget	Visitor direct expenditure	References
2011	11, 12, 18 and 19 March	8,600	$1,500,000	$600,000	
2012	2, 3, 9 and 10 March	30,000	$1,248,000	$300,000	
2013	1 to 9 March	115,000	(estimated) $1,100,000	$650,000	
2014	28 February to 8 March	131,556	(estimated) $1,200,000	$2,300,000	
2015	27 February to 7 March	287,874	(estimated) $1,300,000	$3,350,000	
2016	4 to 12 March				
2017	3 to 12 March				
2018	2 to 18 March				
2019	1 to 11 March				

== Energy usage ==
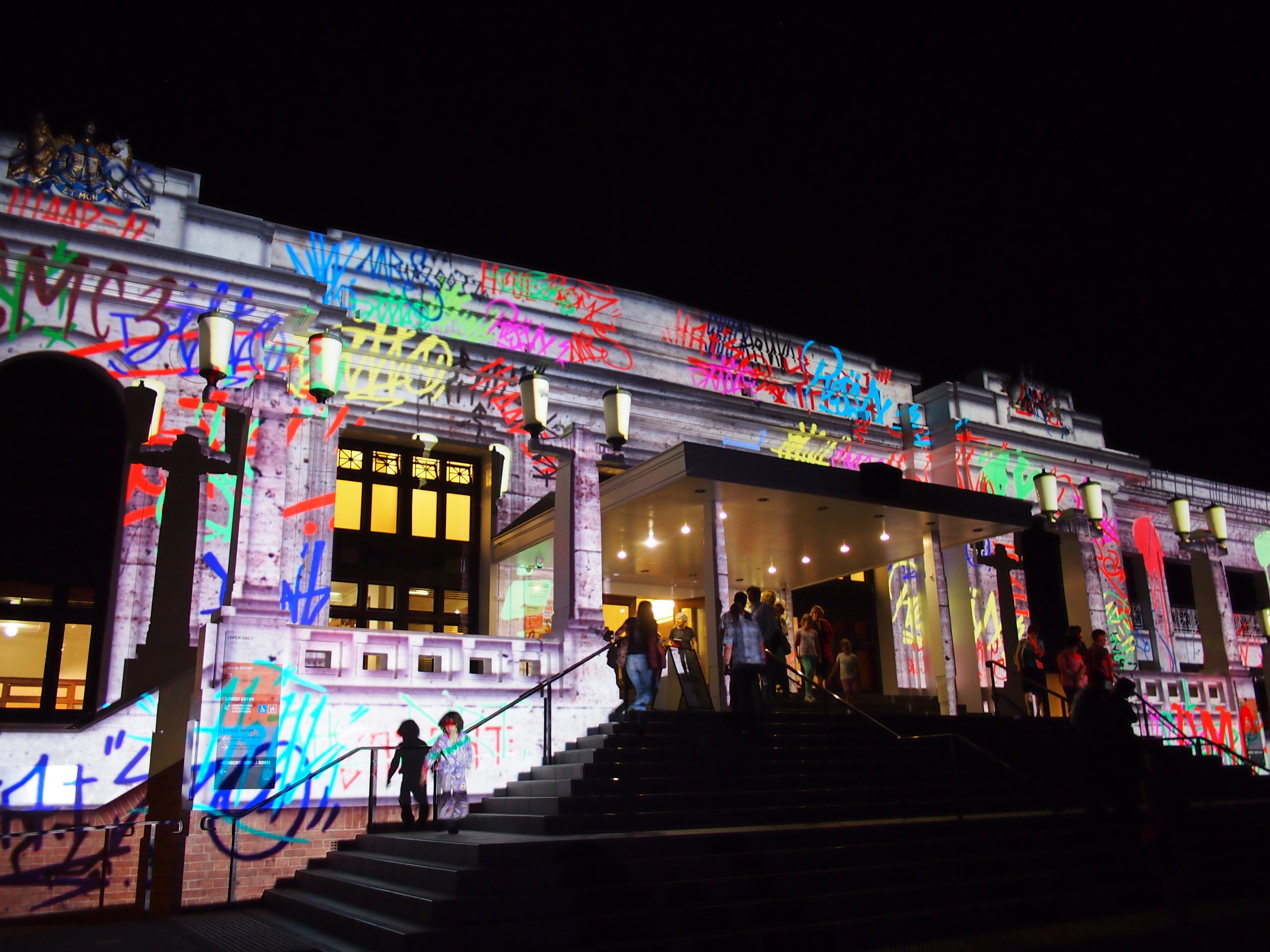
Entrance to Old Parliament House during Enlighten 2013

In 2012, projections for Enlighten were predominantly powered using diesel generators and consumed 2423 litres of diesel, resulting in an estimated 7.0 tonnes of carbon dioxide equivalent greenhouse gas emissions.

== See also ==
- Art of Australia
- Vivid Sydney
