= Aerial Consolidated Transport =

Aerial Consolidated Transport is a taxi and hire car company based in Canberra, Australia. Formed in 1957, it enjoyed monopoly status from 1963, when De-Luxe Taxi Cabs merged with it, until 2007, when a breakaway company, Cabxpress commenced operations.

Aerial (taxis) comprises two brands:

- Canberra Elite.
- Silver Service.

The Silver Service brand is franchised, based on higher service standards than the standard Canberra Elite Cab service. Silver Service cabs are limousines of a longer wheelbase and higher equipment level than the normal taxis.
