= List of magistrates of the Magistrates Court of the Australian Capital Territory =

Listed below are Magistrates of the Magistrates Court of the Australian Capital Territory, as of June 2019, including Chief Magistrates, Magistrates and Special Magistrates.

Prior to 1949, the person holding the office of Police Magistrate at either Queanbeyan or Goulburn exercised the power of Magistrate in the Australian Capital Territory.

Position	Name	Term begin	Term end	Term	Notes
Chief Magistrate	Charles Kilduff (Note: Chief Magistrate who previously served as Magistrate.)	28 November 1974	14 March 1980	5 years, 107 days	
Chief Magistrate	Clarence Hermes	4 December 1980	29 February 1984	3 years, 87 days	
Chief Magistrate	Ronald Cahill	28 March 1985	17 November 2009	24 years, 234 days	
Chief Magistrate	John Burns	15 December 2009	29 July 2011	1 year, 226 days	
Chief Magistrate	Lorraine Walker	13 October 2011		13 years, 144 days	
Acting Chief Magistrate	Kevin Townley Dobson	29 February 1984	March 27, 1985	1 year, 27 days	
Magistrate (Note: Magistrates were known as Stipendiary Magistrates from 1951 to 1986.)	Francis Keane	30 November 1949	28 October 1966	16 years, 332 days	
Magistrate	John Desmond Button	14 May 1959	30 June 1962	3 years, 47 days	
Magistrate	Clarence Hermes (Note: Magistrate who later served as Chief Magistrate.)	6 December 1963	23 April 1970	6 years, 138 days	
Magistrate	Kevin Townley Dobson	13 December 1963	28 February 1984	20 years, 77 days	
Magistrate	Kevin Townley Dobson	28 March 1985	28 April 1986	1 year, 31 days	
Magistrate	Eric Sterndale Pearson	19 October 1967	19 February 1976	8 years, 123 days	
Magistrate	Warren Keith Nicholl	28 May 1971	6 November 1977	6 years, 162 days	
Magistrate	John Joseph Dainer	10 May 1973	23 July 1993	20 years, 74 days	
Magistrate	Charles Kilduff	10 April 1974	27 November 1974	231 days	
Magistrate	Ronald Cahill	22 September 1977	27 March 1985	7 years, 186 days	
Magistrate	Michael Anthony Somes	13 January 1986	31 July 2007	21 years, 199 days	
Magistrate	Michael Ward	21 April 1986	30 June 1998	12 years, 70 days	
Magistrate	Peter Geoffrey Dingwall	26 April 1990	17 August 2016	26 years, 113 days	
Magistrate	John Burns	26 April 1990	December 14, 2009	19 years, 232 days	
Magistrate	Karen Fryar	6 September 1993	8 March 2019	25 years, 183 days	
Magistrate	Shane Madden	19 December 1996	10 July 2009	12 years, 203 days	
Magistrate	Beth Campbell	5 August 1998	3 March 2023	26 years, 213 days	
Magistrate	Maria Doogan	5 August 1998	30 March 2012	13 years, 238 days	
Magistrate	Grant Lalor	1 February 2004	29 May 2012	8 years, 118 days	
Magistrate	Lorraine Walker	19 July 2010	12 October 2011	1 year, 85 days	
Magistrate	David Mossop	23 December 2011	21 May 2013	1 year, 149 days	
Magistrate	Peter Morrison	14 February 2012		13 years, 20 days	
Magistrate	Bernadette Boss	11 June 2012		12 years, 268 days	
Magistrate	Robert Matthew Cook	11 September 2013		11 years, 176 days	
Magistrate	Glenn Theakston	30 May 2016		8 years, 280 days	
Magistrate	Louise Taylor	10 August 2018		6 years, 208 days	
Magistrate	James Lawton	6 May 2019		5 years, 304 days	
Magistrate	James Stewart	6 May 2019		5 years, 304 days	
Special Magistrate	John Goodwin	25 November 1930	6 September 1936	5 years, 286 days	
Special Magistrate	Sir Robert Garran	27 March 1942			
Special Magistrate	Arthur Percival	28 November 1946			
Special Magistrate	Robert McKillop	14 May 1947			
Special Magistrate	Francis Keane (Note: Special Magistrate who has also served as a Magistrate.)	18 May 1947	29 November 1949	2 years, 195 days	
Special Magistrate	Francis Keane	28 October 1966			
Special Magistrate	Sidney Rhodes	9 July 1947	6 October 1953	6 years, 89 days	
Special Magistrate	Frank Clifton Green	9 July 1947			
Special Magistrate	Frank Gordon Thorpe	9 July 1947	23 December 1953	6 years, 167 days	
Special Magistrate	Charles Francis Denton	21 March 1957			
Special Magistrate	John Llanover Davies	16 April 1957			
Special Magistrate	Geoffrey Sawer	16 April 1957			
Special Magistrate	Edmond Monaghan Debenham	9 August 1962			
Special Magistrate	Everard Roy Harvey	20 September 1962			
Special Magistrate	Keith Stacey Edmonds	5 April 1963			
Special Magistrate	Martin Sylvester Meagher	23 April 1963			
Special Magistrate	Alexander John Paton	24 August 1967			
Special Magistrate	Brian Frederick Lake Crommelin	23 November 1967			
Special Magistrate	Rexton James Humby	17 April 1968			
Special Magistrate	William Stilwell Flynn	30 April 1968			
Special Magistrate	John Roderick Scarlett	27 March 1969			
Special Magistrate	Charles Kingsley Ward	27 March 1969			
Special Magistrate	Clement Lewis Fischer	29 June 1970			
Special Magistrate	Thomas Francis Price	26 August 1976			
Special Magistrate	Eric Sterndale Pearson	26 August 1976			
Special Magistrate	Alan Eugene Hogan	22 September 1977	5 June 1989	11 years, 256 days	
Special Magistrate	Desmond O'Connor	16 February 1978			
Special Magistrate	David Bruce Nichols	19 October 1978			
Special Magistrate	Charles Kilduff	27 March 1980	4 November 1981	1 year, 222 days	
Special Magistrate	Anthony William Wynne	9 July 1982			
Special Magistrate	James Joseph O'Neill	27 January 1983			
Special Magistrate	Kevin Townley Dobson	20 August 1986			
Special Magistrate	John Martin Murphy	19 May 1988			
Special Magistrate	Marcus Kessell Bannister	14 October 1988			
Special Magistrate	Alan Anthony Hardiman	24 November 1988			
Special Magistrate	Douglas William Smith	14 December 1989	1 July 1994	4 years, 199 days	
Special Magistrate	John Joseph Dainer	3 March 1994			
Special Magistrate	Christine Susan Harvey	30 September 1994			
Special Magistrate	Elizabeth Marjorie Symons	30 September 1994	30 September 2004	10 years, 0 days	
Special Magistrate	Garry George Dellar	30 September 1994			
Special Magistrate	Warren Keith Nicholl	20 February 1996			
Special Magistrate	Michael Ward	20 July 1998	30 August 1998	41 days	
Special Magistrate	Michael Ward	22 September 1998	30 October 1998	38 days	
Special Magistrate	Michael Henry Peedom	11 November 1998	10 November 2005	6 years, 364 days	
Special Magistrate	Phillip Raymond Thompson	12 September 2000	28 February 2006	5 years, 169 days	
Special Magistrate	Ian Henry Pike	29 September 2001	28 August 2002	364 days	
Special Magistrate	Grant Lalor	25 June 2002	13 December 2002	171 days	
Special Magistrate	Kenneth Cush	13 October 2008	30 June 2010	1 year, 260 days	
Special Magistrate	Kenneth Cush	3 June 2013	15 December 2018	5 years, 195 days	
Special Magistrate	Bill Stefaniak	17 November 2008	2 February 2009	77 days	
Special Magistrate	Graeme Lunney	16 May 2011	15 May 2014	2 years, 364 days	
Special Magistrate	Christopher Chenoweth	16 May 2011	15 May 2014	2 years, 364 days	
Special Magistrate	Maria Doogan	3 June 2013	6 May 2017	3 years, 337 days	
Special Magistrate	Margaret Hunter	21 May 2014		10 years, 289 days	
Special Magistrate	Dominic Mulligan	21 May 2014	6 May 2017	2 years, 350 days	
