= Coroner's Court of the Australian Capital Territory =

- Jurisdiction: Australian Capital Territory
- Location: London Circuit at Civic, Canberra
- Authorised by: Australian Capital Territory Legislative Assembly via the Coroners Act 1997
- Appeals to: Supreme Court of the Australian Capital Territory
- Website: www.courts.act.gov.au/magistrates/courts/coroners_court

Chief Coroner
- Currently: Lorraine Walker
- Since: 13 October 2011

The Coroner's Court of the Australian Capital Territory is a court which has exclusive jurisdiction over the remains of a person and the power to make findings in respect of the cause of death of a person or fire in Australian Capital Territory.

== History ==
The office of coroner in the territory derives from the legal framework inherited from the United Kingdom.

== Jurisdiction ==
At common law, coroners would constitute a court by virtue of their office. In the Australian Capital Territory, this common law position has been abolished and there is now the Coroner’s Court established.

Coroners have the power to investigate the causes of death within their jurisdiction. They also have power to retain a person’s remains, order autopsies, and direct how a person’s remains may be disposed. Coroners also have jurisdiction to hold inquests concerning the cause of any fire in the territory.

Where a serious criminal offence has been disclosed during the course of an inquest, the coroner cannot proceed with it if a person is to be charged with that criminal offence. The coroner stops the inquest and refers the matter to the Director of Public Prosecutions for consideration and investigation. This changes the early colonial practice of coroners directly committing persons suspected of serious crimes directly for trial.

Supreme Court of the Australian Capital Territory has a supervisory role over the court, and may review, quash or direct inquests.

In certain situations, the Attorney General may direct the Chief Coroner to conduct cause an inquiry to be held into a disaster in the territory.

== Composition ==
All magistrates are coroners by virtue of their appointment. The Chief Coroner may appoint a special magistrate as a coroner.

The Chief Magistrate of the Australian Capital Territory is the Chief Coroner for the territory. The Chief Coroner has the function to oversee and co-ordinate coronial services in the territory, ensure that all deaths and suspected deaths concerning which a coroner has jurisdiction to hold an inquest are properly investigated, and ensuring that an inquest is held whenever it is required, and to issue guidelines to coroners to assist them in the exercise or performance of their functions.

== Membership ==
=== Chief Coroner ===
Name	Date appointed	Term in office	Notes
Chief Coroner Lorraine Walker	13 October 2011	14 years, 323 days	

=== Coroners ===
Name	Date appointed	Term in office	Notes
Coroner Beth Campbell	5 August 1998	28 years, 27 days	
Coroner Peter Morrison	14 February 2012	14 years, 199 days	
Coroner Bernadette Boss	11 June 2012	14 years, 82 days	
Coroner Robert Cook	11 September 2013	12 years, 355 days	
Coroner Margaret Hunter OAM	21 May 2014	12 years, 103 days	
Coroner Glenn Theakston	17 May 2016	10 years, 107 days	
Coroner Louise Taylor	10 September 2018	7 years, 356 days	

== Process ==
Coroners must investigate the manner and cause of death for persons who die or may have died in certain circumstances. This includes people who:

- dies violently, or unnaturally, in unknown circumstances;
- dies under suspicious circumstances;
- dies and the death appears to be completely or partly attributable to an operation or procedure;
- dies after having undergone an operation or procedure and in circumstances that, in the opinion of the Chief Coroner, should be better ascertained; or
- dies and a doctor has not given a certificate about the cause of death;
- dies not having been attended by a doctor at any time within the period commencing 6 months before the death; or
- dies after an accident where the cause of death appears to be directly attributable to the accident; or
- dies, or is suspected to have died, in circumstances that, in the opinion of the Attorney-General, should be better ascertained;
- dies in custody.

They are required, where possible, to establish: the identity of the deceased; when and where the death happened; the manner and cause of death, and in the case of the suspected death of a person — that the person has died.

The coroner will initially ask police to investigate and provide a report to the coroner.

Coroners can then either decide to waive a hearing where it is not necessary or decide to hold a public hearing.

== Significant inquests and/or inquiries ==
Notable inquests include:

- The Royal Canberra Hospital implosion;
- The Murder of Colin Winchester; and
- The 2003 Canberra bushfires.

== See also ==
- List of coroners courts in Australia
