= David Eastman (wrongful conviction) =

Australian public servant

- Born: David Harold Eastman
- Education: Canberra Grammar School; University of Sydney
- Occupation: Public servant
- Known for: Trials, wrongful conviction, and subsequent acquittal of the murder of Colin Winchester
- Criminal charge: Murder
- Criminal penalty: Life imprisonment without parole
- Criminal status: Exonerated
- Father: Allan Eastman

David Harold Eastman is a former public servant from Canberra, Australia. In 1995, he was wrongfully convicted of the murder of Australian Federal Police Assistant Commissioner Colin Winchester and was sentenced to life imprisonment without parole. A 2014 judicial inquiry recommended the sentence be quashed and he should be pardoned. On 22 August of the same year, the Supreme Court of the Australian Capital Territory quashed the conviction, released Eastman from prison, and ordered a retrial.

Eastman sought leave to the High Court to appeal against the decision for a retrial. His appeal was unsuccessful, and a retrial commenced on 18 June 2018. On 22 November 2018, the jury in the retrial found Eastman not guilty of murder. Eastman, who had served 19 years in custody, was awarded A$7 million in compensation in October 2019.

== Early life and background ==
Eastman's father, Allan Eastman who died in 1987, worked at the Australian Department of Foreign Affairs and had several overseas postings in ambassadorial roles. Eastman was born in 1945 and as a child he frequently moved house due to his father's overseas postings. Eastman has one younger sister and two older twin sisters. Eastman was very successful at Canberra Grammar School where he was dux, and he went to the University of Sydney at the age of 16. When he was 21 he started seeing a psychiatrist because he was "feeling lonely and miserable and not getting on with people".

In 1986, Eastman's mother requested a restraining order on Eastman after he threatened her life while trying to break down her front door.

== Career ==
Eastman was a Treasury official until 1977 when he retired on health grounds. He later applied for a post at the Australian Bureau of Statistics but was rejected with one reason being given that he had written letters to the press regarding economic and business matters which might be seen to prejudice the Bureau's reputation. Although the Ombudsman was not allowed to investigate internal public service matters, he agreed to investigate a case brought by Eastman because he was a member of the public at the time. Subsequently, the Ombudsman concluded there had not been discrimination against Eastman.

Eastman had sought, on several fronts and over a sustained period, to be reinstated to the public service. On 21 December 1988 approval to his reinstatement was granted.

According to media reports from Eastman's criminal trial, Eastman became involved in a dispute with a neighbour on 17 December 1987; and Eastman was charged with assault. He led a determined campaign to convince police that he had been wrongly charged and that it was his neighbour who had been the instigator. On 16 December 1988 Eastman met with Colin Winchester, the Chief Police Officer of ACT Policing, in an attempt to review the assault charge. The meeting was brokered by Neil Brown, the shadow attorney-general, who also met with Peter McAulay, the Commissioner of the Australian Federal Police. On 21 December 1988 Winchester advised Eastman that he would need to face the assault charges in court; and an appearance date was set for 12 January 1989. Eastman was advised by letter that the AFP would not interfere with the conviction. The letter arrived at Eastman's flat on the morning of 10 January 1989.

It was alleged that Eastman had made threats against Winchester's life in the period preceding Winchester's murder.

== Death of Winchester ==
On 10 January 1989, at about 9:15 pm, Colin Winchester was shot twice in the head with a Ruger 10/22 .22-calibre semi-automatic rifle fitted with a silencer. Winchester was murdered as he parked his police vehicle near his house in Deakin, Canberra. Winchester parked in his neighbour's driveway; his neighbour was an elderly woman who felt safer with a car parked in her driveway. Winchester is Australia's most senior police officer to have been murdered.

The day following Winchester's murder, police interviewed Eastman as a murder suspect.

== Legal proceedings ==
After two years of investigations that included an inquest by the ACT Chief Coroner, Eastman was summonsed to appear before the Coroner, but failed to do so. A warrant for Eastman's arrest was issued on 23 December 1992 and on the same day he was arrested and charged with the murder of Winchester. Eastman was subsequently committed to a trial.

=== Murder trial ===
During the 85-day trial that commenced in 1995, Eastman repeatedly sacked his legal team and eventually chose to represent himself. Eastman also abused the judge during his trial, and during later legal proceedings and appeals. A report written for Eastman's murder trial stated that he previously had "six charges of threatening to kill, 128 charges of making harassing or menacing phone calls, 11 charges of assault and one of assault occasioning actual bodily harm". Also "He has been charged with assaulting police on three occasions." During the trial the Crown presented evidence that allegedly linked Eastman to the firearm used, to traces of ammunition and propellant from the silencer, and reported sightings of Eastman near the murder scene and at gun shops in Queanbeyan. Eastman was legally bugged for three and a half years; yet only a very small proportion of the recorded material was used as evidence in his trial. In evaluating the case, Flinders University academic, David Hamer, reported that:

The prosecution case at trial, while purely circumstantial, was substantial:

... the Crown presented in excess of 200 witnesses. There were almost 7000 pages of transcript and over 300 documentary and other exhibits.

— Assoc. Prof. David Hamer, Faculty of Law, Flinders University, 2015.

After a lengthy and difficult trial, on 3 November 1995 a jury returned a verdict of guilty against Eastman and he was convicted for murder of Winchester. Eastman was sentenced to life imprisonment.

=== Subsequent appeals and inquiries ===
Subsequent to his conviction, Eastman was litigious and repeatedly appealed against his conviction. He lost an appeal in the Federal Court in 1999; and a subsequent appeal to the High Court in 2000. In 2000 and 2001, while detained in the Goulburn Correctional Centre, Eastman successfully lobbied for and was granted a judicial review of his conviction. The aim of the review was to determine if Eastman had sufficient mental capacity in order to plead in the trial for the murder of Winchester. After two years of hearings, Miles J determined that Eastman had sufficient capacity and the conviction for murder was unchanged.

Eastman tried again in 2005 on several grounds, including his fitness to stand trial, unreliable forensic evidence taken from the scene, and other doubts as to his guilt. His application was dismissed. In 2008 proceedings before the Full Bench of the Federal Court, Eastman, appearing without legal representation, sought that his initial appeal be allowed, his conviction quashed and a retrial in the Supreme Court. The matter was dismissed.

A new inquiry relating to his conviction was announced in August 2012 and headed by Acting Justice Brian Martin. Louise Taylor, later the first Indigenous Australian jurist in the ACT and the first Aboriginal woman to be appointed as a Supreme Court judge in Australia, worked on the inquiry. Martin reported to the Supreme Court that:

A substantial miscarriage of justice occurred in the applicant’s trial. The applicant did not receive a fair trial according to law. He was denied a fair chance of acquittal. The issue of guilt was determined on the basis of deeply flawed forensic evidence in circumstances where the applicant was denied procedural fairness in respect of a fundamental feature of the trial process concerned with disclosure by the prosecution of all relevant material. As a consequence of the substantial miscarriage of justice, the applicant has been in custody for almost 19 years. The miscarriage of justice was such that in ordinary circumstances a court of criminal appeal hearing an appeal against conviction soon after the conviction would allow the appeal and order a retrial. A retrial is not feasible and would not be fair. While I am fairly certain the applicant is guilty of the murder of the deceased, a nagging doubt remains. The case against the applicant based on the admissible and properly tested evidence is not overwhelming; it is properly described as a strong circumstantial case. There is also material pointing to an alternative hypothesis consistent with innocence, the strength of which is unknown. Regardless of my view of the case and the applicant’s guilt, the substantial miscarriage of justice suffered by the applicant should not be allowed to stand uncorrected. To allow such a miscarriage of justice to stand uncorrected would be contrary to the fundamental principles that guide the administration of justice in Australia and would bring the administration of justice into disrepute. Allowing such a miscarriage of justice to stand uncorrected would severely undermine public confidence in the administration of justice. In view of the nature of the miscarriage of justice that has occurred and the period the applicant has spent in custody, and in view of the powers conferred on the Full Court, I do not recommend that the Court confirm the conviction and recommend that the Executive grant a pardon. I recommend that the applicant’s conviction on 3 November 1995 for the murder of Colin Stanley Winchester be quashed.

— Martin J (Acting), "Report of the Board of Inquiry." Inquiry into the Conviction of David Harold Eastman for the Murder of Colin Stanley Winchester, 29 May 2014.

The Australian Federal Police unsuccessfully sought that parts of the report be withheld.

On 22 August 2014 the Supreme Court of the Australian Capital Territory quashed the conviction, released Eastman from prison, and ordered a retrial in spite of the recommendation from the report by Martin J that "a retrial is neither feasible, nor fair." Eastman appealed the decision for a retrial to the ACT Court of Appeal and then to the High Court. Both appeals were dismissed and in 2017 it was ordered that a retrial should be held. The retrial commenced in Canberra on 18 June 2018.

=== Retrial and compensation ===
On 22 November 2018, Eastman was found not guilty by a jury in the ACT Supreme Court. Eastman's lawyer Angus Webb read out a statement, saying a miscarriage of justice had left Eastman spending 19 years in custody. Referring to today's verdict he said, "Justice has been done." Terry O'Donnell, a former public defender who previously acted for Eastman said outside the court that he had been watching the legal saga "with some horror," but was now relieved for Eastman. "The first trial was an absolute disgrace, it was a shambles, it was a miscarriage – the forensic evidence was almost certainly fabricated in some respects." The cost of the retrial, including lead-up proceedings, was estimated to exceed A$30 million. Eastman, who had served 19 years in custody, lodged a civil claim against the ACT Government, seeking compensation for wrongful imprisonment. Eastman rejected an ex-gratia offer of compensation of more than A$3 million, instead asking for at least A$18 million. On 14 October 2019, in the ACT Supreme Court, Justice Michael Elkaim awarded Eastman A$7.02 million in compensation under the Human Rights Act and ordered the ACT Government to pay Eastman's costs.

=== Other legal matters ===
Whilst in custody, in 2001 Eastman was evicted from his public housing apartment that he had not occupied for ten years. Eastman appealed the eviction order to the ACT Supreme Court on the basis that he had not been given enough notice to effectively defend his position. The Court ruled in Eastman's favour and determined that he was denied natural justice. The ACT Tenancy Tribunal was directed to review the case.

On 27 May 2009 Eastman was transferred from a New South Wales prison to the Alexander Maconochie Centre, a newly opened prison located in the ACT, to see out his sentence. During his period in New South Wales prisons he lodged a large number of complaints alleging ill-treatment by guards and was frequently moved between jails.

== See also ==
- List of miscarriage of justice cases

== Selected legal proceedings ==
- R v David Harold Eastman [1995] ACTSC 3 (10 February 1995), Supreme Court (ACT, Australia)
- Eastman v The Queen [1997] FCA 548 (25 June 1997), Federal Court (Australia)
  – Eastman's 1997 appeal to the Federal Court claiming that the trial judge erred in the directions which he gave to the jury on various grounds; and granted discriminatory bail conditions. The Court dismissed the appeal.
- David Harold Eastman v the Queen [1997] FCA 76, Federal Court (Australia)
- Eastman v R [2000] HCA 29, 203 CLR 1 (25 May 2000), High Court (Australia)
  – Eastman's 2000 appeal to the High Court that Eastman was unfit to plead and the Crown knew that he was suffering a mental illness and was incapable of instructing legal counsel, matters not previously reviewed by the Courts. The Court dismissed the appeal.
- Eastman v Director of Public Prosecutions (ACT) [2003] HCA 28 (28 May 2003), High Court (Australia)
  – Eastman's 2003 appeal to the High Court that a Magistrate, appointed by the ACT Supreme Court, be empowered to review evidence to determine the fitness of Eastman to plead, reviewing earlier decisions made by the ACT Supreme Court and the Full Court of the Federal Court. The High Court upheld the appeal.
- Eastman v The Australian Capital Territory [2008] ACTCA 8 (1 April 2008), Court of Appeal (ACT, Australia)
  – Eastman's 2008 appeal to the ACT Supreme Court Court of Appeal following the decision by the ACT Supreme Court (single judge) that Eastman was not denied procedural fairness. The Court dismissed the appeal.
- Eastman v Director of Public Prosecutions (No 2) [2014] ACTSCFC 2 (22 August 2014), Supreme Court (Full Court) (ACT, Australia)
  – Full Court of the ACT Supreme Court decision to quash Eastman's conviction and to order a retrial.
- Eastman v Director of Public Prosecutions (No 13) [2016] ACTCA 65 (2 December 2016), Court of Appeal (ACT, Australia)
  – Eastman's 2016 appeal to the ACT Court of Appeal following an earlier unsuccessful appeal to the ACT Supreme Court for a permanent stay on proceedings for the charge of murder. The Court dismissed the appeal.
