= Coroners Court of Queensland =

- Established: 1958
- Authorised by: Queensland Parliament via the Coroners Act 2003 (Qld)
- Appeals to: District Court of Queensland
- Number of positions: 7
- Website: https://www.coronerscourt.qld.gov.au/

State Coroner
- Currently: Mr Terry Ryan

The Coroners Court of Queensland is a court in the court hierarchy of Queensland, Australia. The Court has exclusive jurisdiction in Queensland over the remains of a person and to make findings about the cause of death of a person.

== Jurisdiction ==
A coroner will investigate a death where the identity of the deceased is not known; the death was violent or unnatural, such as accidents, falls, suicides or drug overdoses; the death happened in suspicious circumstances; a cause of death certificate has not been issued and is not likely to be issued; the death was a health care related death; the death occurred in care or custody (such as an aged care, correctional, mental health, or juvenile detention facility); or the death occurred as a result of the operations of Queensland Police.

A coroner may decide to hold an inquest which has the powers of a court, compelling witnesses to give evidence before the Court, and in making findings can make recommendations aimed at preventing similar deaths. Cultural and family concerns are typically considered as part of any coronial investigation.

Decisions made by the Coroners Court may be heard on appeal to the District Court of Queensland; and the Coroners Court has appellate jurisdiction where the investigating coroner declines a request for an inquest.

== Composition ==
Queensland has seven full-time coroners, presided over by the state coroner and the deputy state coroner, both based in Brisbane, and additional coroners who are located in Brisbane, Cairns, Mackay, and Southport.

== See also ==
- Australian court hierarchy
- Judiciary of Australia
- List of Queensland courts and tribunals
- List of coroners courts in Australia
