= Peter Morrison (disambiguation) =

Peter Morrison (1944–1995) was a British Conservative politician

Peter Morrison may also refer to:

- Peter Reed Morrison (1919–2019), American professor of animal physiology
- Peter Morrison (Australian footballer) (born 1956), played for Footscray and South Melbourne
- Peter Morrison (English footballer) (born 1980), played for Scunthorpe United
- Peter Morrison (jurist), Australian magistrate
- Peter Morrison, local councillor in Fallowfield, Manchester, England
- Peter Morrison, pipe and whistle player of Scottish band Peatbog Faeries
- Peter Morrison (All Saints), character in Australian TV medical drama All Saints

== See also ==
- Pete Morrison (1880–1973), American silent western film actor
