= National Commissioner for Defence and Veteran Suicide Prevention =

Agency overview
- Formed: 1 October 2020; 4 years ago
- Agency executive: Dr Bernadette Boss CSC, Commissioner
- Website: www.nationalcommissionerdvsp.gov.au

The National Commissioner for Defence and Veteran Suicide Prevention is a statutory official in Australia, independent of the Government of Australia, established under Australian law.

== History ==
On 5 February 2020, the Prime Minister of Australia, Scott Morrison MP, announced the intention to create a law to establish the role of National Commissioner for Defence and Veteran Suicide Prevention.

The legislation for this role was delayed due to the limited number of sitting days in 2020 of the Parliament of Australia due to COVID-19.

On 1 October 2020, Dr Bernadette Boss CSC, then a Magistrate of the Australian Capital Territory and Coroner, also a Brigadier in the Australian Army Reserve, was named the first (as "interim") National Commissioner. The Minister for Veterans' Affairs, Darren Chester MP, noted, "As a current Magistrate and Coroner in the Australian Capital Territory, Dr Boss has the skills and expertise to examine these tragic instances of ADF and veteran suicides to understand practical actions to reduce suicide risk."

== Role ==
Subject to the passage of the legislation, it is expected that the National Commissioner will have the power to:

- inquire into the circumstances of past and future deaths of serving and ex-serving ADF members by suicide, including suspected deaths by suicide
- hear about the impact of deaths of serving and ex-serving ADF members by suicide on families and others affected
- make findings and recommendations to the Australian Government following such inquiries
- promote the understanding of suicide risk factors for serving and ex-serving ADF members, and protective factors that can improve their wellbeing and prevent suicide.

The National Commissioner will have full Royal Commission-like powers to gather information and evidence. This includes by consulting families and experts, as well as summoning witnesses. With these powers, the National Commissioner can also get relevant information and reports, including from government departments such as the Department of Defence and the Department of Veterans' Affairs.

== See also ==
- Royal Commission into Defence and Veteran Suicide
