= Royal Commission into Defence and Veteran Suicide =

Australian government commission

- Commissioners: Nick Kaldas APM; The Hon. James Douglas KC; Dr Peggy Brown AO
- Inquiry period: 8 July 2021 – 17 June 2024
- Constituting instrument: Royal Commissions Act 1902 (Cth)
- Website: defenceveteransuicide.royalcommission.gov.au

The Royal Commission into Defence and Veteran Suicide was a royal commission established on 8 July 2021 by the Australian government pursuant to the Royal Commissions Act 1902. The governor-general, David Hurley, issued the letters patent which established the royal commission.

Under the letters patent Nick Kaldas APM, James Douglas KC, and Dr Peggy Brown AO were appointed as Royal Commissioners. They delivered an interim report on 11 August 2022. The letters patent set out the Royal Commissioners' terms of reference. They were originally to produce a final report by 17 June 2024, and it was presented on 9 September 2024 to the governor-general, Sam Mostyn AC, and tabled in the Australian Parliament on the same day. The report made 122 recommendations.

== Background ==
Between 1997 and 2020 there were 1,600 known cases of defence force personnel and veteran suicides in Australia. The federal government resisted calls for the establishment of a royal commission, instead preferring establishing a permanent National Commissioner for veteran suicides. A National Commissioner for Defence and Veteran Suicide Prevention was established in February 2020. The work of the National Commissioner for Defence and Veteran Suicide Prevention concluded on 15 September 2021.

Following increased pressure from members of the public, on 22 March 2021, the motion to support the establishment of the Royal Commission into Defence and Veteran Suicide passed both the Senate and the House of Representatives.

The Royal Commission into Defence and Veteran Suicide was established on 8 July 2021 by letters patent, pursuant to the Royal Commissions Act 1902, and the commissioners were appointed.

== Powers ==
The powers of Royal Commissions in Australia are set out in the Royal Commissions Act 1902.

After a recommendation in the Interim Report, the Australian Government agreed to make legislative reform to provide stronger and broader protections to those who engage with the Royal Commission. On 30 March 2023, the Government expanded protections, and amended section 60Q (Protection of certain information given to the Defence and Veteran Suicide Royal Commission) of the Act. The amended legislation ensured that any sensitive, personal or confidential information disclosed to the commission was protected during and after the inquiry.

On 14 September 2023, the Royal Commissions Amendment (Private Sessions) Bill 2023 passed in parliament. The new laws outlined in this bill allow royal commissions to appoint qualified and experienced senior staff members of royal commissions to conduct private sessions, in order to assist in workload. Prior to this, only royal commissioners were able to conduct private sessions, as outlined in the Royal Commissions Act 1902.

== Hearings ==
The Royal Commission into Defence and Veteran Suicide commenced its proceedings with a ceremonial hearing in Brisbane on 26 November 2021.

In its first two years, the Royal Commission has conducted eleven public hearings in various towns and cities across Australia, including: Brisbane, Sydney, Canberra, Townsville, Hobart, Darwin, Wagga Wagga, Perth, Adelaide, and Melbourne.

Across these hearings, the Commission heard from over 300 witnesses, including:

- Lived experience witnesses – people with direct experience of defence service, their families, and support people
- Professional witnesses – ex-service organisations, academics, mental health professionals
- Commonwealth witnesses – high-ranking defence personnel, Members of Parliament, public servants.

The Royal Commission heard evidence about risk and protective factors that are unique to military service, including the role and importance of families, Australian Defence Force (ADF) culture, transition out of the Australian Defence Force, delays with Department of Veterans' Affairs claims, and more.

== Reports ==
=== Interim report ===
As outlined by the letters patent, the Royal Commissioners presented the interim report of the Royal Commission into Defence and Veteran Suicide to the governor-general, General David Hurley AC on 11 August 2022. The interim report was tabled in Parliament on the same day, containing urgent recommendations and information based on the Royal Commission's work to date. It includes initial findings on suicide prevention and wellbeing, families, ADF culture, transition, and what might happen after the Royal Commission.

In the Interim Report, the Royal Commission made 13 urgent recommendations, including:

- Legislative reform to simplify the veteran compensation and rehabilitation system.
- Steps to eliminate the Departments of Veterans’ Affairs claims backlog.
- Improving access to information for serving and ex-serving members and their families.
- Strengthening protections to help serving members feel more comfortable sharing their stories.
- Calling on the Government to remove the barriers to the commission's work caused by parliamentary privilege and public interest immunity.

In September 2022, the Government responded to the Interim Report, and outlined changes it would implement based on recommendations made by the Royal Commission.

=== Final report ===
On 9 September 2024 the Royal Commission handed down its Final Report. It made 122 recommendations including establishing a new support body to assist defence personnel transition into civilian life.

== Submissions ==
The Royal Commission invited members of the public, organisations, and institutions to share their experiences by making a submission. This included serving and ex-serving ADF personnel, their friends and family, support people, and organisation whose work related to the Royal Commission's terms of reference. Those who made a submission could remain anonymous.

Submissions did not need to relate only to suicide. Submissions could include anything relevant to the Royal Commission's terms of reference. Themes such as military service, trauma, mental health, family support, and more were important to the Royal Commission's inquiry.

Submissions opened on 8 July 2021 and closed on 13 October 2023. In that time, the Royal Commission received over 5000 submissions that covered a range of issues that related to the Royal Commission's terms of reference.

About 80% of submissions were from serving and ex-serving Australian Defence Force personnel, and their families and friends.

The five most common themes identified were:

- suicide and suicidal behaviour
- ADF culture, governance and accountability
- mental illness
- Department of Veterans' Affairs claims and compensation, and
- ADF mental health support and responses.

Some submissions were published on the Royal Commission's website, with the consent of the author.

== See also ==
- List of Australian royal commissions
