= List of Australian Capital Territory courts and tribunals =

The following is a list of courts and tribunals in the Australian Capital Territory:

== List of boards, commissions, courts, and tribunals ==
=== Sitting boards, commissions, courts, and tribunals ===
The list of sitting boards and commissions is sourced from the ACT Government Informational Portal.

==== Sitting boards and councils ====
- ACT Board of Senior Secondary Studies
- ACT Cultural Council
- ACT Government Procurement Board
- ACT Government School Education Council
- ACT Heritage Council
- ACT Insurance Authority Advisory Board
- ACT Ministerial Advisory Council on Women
- Australian Capital Territory Architects Board
- Community Inclusion Board
- Health Professions Registration Boards of the ACT
- Medical Board of the ACT
- Ministerial Advisory Council on Ageing
- Minister's Youth Advisory Council
- Territory Records Advisory Council

==== Sitting commissions ====
- Independent Competition and Regulatory Commission
- ACT Commissioner for Sustainability and the Environment

==== Sitting courts ====
- Children's Court of the Australian Capital Territory
- Coroner's Court of the Australian Capital Territory
- Magistrates Court of the Australian Capital Territory
- Supreme Court of the Australian Capital Territory

==== Sitting tribunals ====
- ACT Civil and Administrative Tribunal

== See also ==
- Australian court hierarchy
- ACT Government
