= List of ordinances of the Australian Capital Territory from 1989 =

This is a list of ordinances enacted by the Governor-General of Australia for the Australian Capital Territory for the year 1989.

== 1989 ==
Short title, or popular name	Citation	Notified
Long title
Betting (Totalizator Agency) (Amendment) Ordinance 1989 or the Betting (Totalizator Agency) (Amendment) Act 1989 (repealed)	No. 1 of 1989	8 February 1989
An Ordinance to amend the Betting (Totalizator Agency) Ordinance 1964. (Note: Betting (Totalizator Agency) Ordinance 1964 (No. 14)) (Repealed by Statute Law Amendment Act 2000 (No. 80))
Classification of Publications (Amendment) Ordinance 1989 (Note: This is a reserved law and cannot be amended or repealed by the Legislative Assembly of the Australian Capital Territory.)	No. 2 of 1989	15 February 1989
An Ordinance to amend the Classification of Publications Ordinance 1983. (Note: Classification of Publications Ordinance 1983 (No. 59))
Fire Brigade (Administration) (Amendment) Ordinance 1989 or the Fire Brigade (Administration) (Amendment) Act 1989 (repealed)	No. 3 of 1989	1 March 1989
An Ordinance to amend the Fire Brigade (Administration) Ordinance 1974. (Note: Fire Brigade (Administration) Ordinance 1974 (No. 52)) (Repealed by Statute Law Amendment Act 2000 (No. 80))
Agents (Amendment) Ordinance 1989 or the Agents (Amendment) Act 1989 (repealed)	No. 4 of 1989	8 March 1989
An Ordinance to amend the Agents Ordinance 1968. (Note: Agents Ordinance 1968 (No. 26)) (Repealed by Statute Law Amendment Act 2000 (No. 80))
Instruments (Amendment) Ordinance 1989 or the Instruments (Amendment) Act 1989 (repealed)	No. 5 of 1989	8 March 1989
An Ordinance to amend the Instruments Ordinance 1933. (Note: Instruments Ordinance 1933 (No. 25)) (Repealed by Statute Law Amendment Act 2000 (No. 80))
Motor Traffic (Amendment) Ordinance 1989 or the Motor Traffic (Amendment) Act 1989 (repealed)	No. 6 of 1989	8 March 1989
An Ordinance to amend the Motor Traffic Ordinance 1936. (Note: Motor Traffic Ordinance 1936 (No. 45)) (Repealed by Road Transport Legislation Amendment Act 1999 (No. 79)
Stamp Duties and Taxes (Amendment) Ordinance 1989 or the Stamp Duties and Taxes (Amendment) Act 1989 (repealed)	No. 7 of 1989	8 March 1989
An Ordinance to amend the Stamp Duties and Taxes Ordinance 1987. (Note: Stamp Duties and Taxes Ordinance 1987 (No. 39)) (Repealed by Duties (Consequential and Transitional Provisions) Act 1999 (No. 8))
Motor Traffic (Amendment) Ordinance (No. 2) 1989 or the Motor Traffic (Amendment) Act (No. 2) 1989 (repealed)	No. 8 of 1989	8 March 1989
An Ordinance to amend the Motor Traffic Ordinance 1936. (Repealed by Road Transport Legislation Amendment Act 1999 (No. 79)
Co-operative Societies (Amendment) Ordinance 1989 or the Co-operative Societies (Amendment) Act 1989 (repealed)	No. 9 of 1989	8 March 1989
An Ordinance to amend the Co-operative Societies Ordinance 1939. (Note: Co-operative Societies Ordinance 1939 (No. 9)) (Repealed by Statute Law Amendment Act 2000 (No. 80))
Public Health (Amendment) Ordinance 1989 or the Public Health (Amendment) Act 1989 (repealed)	No. 10 of 1989	8 March 1989
An Ordinance to amend the Public Health Ordinance 1928. (Note: Public Health Ordinance 1928 (No. 21)) (Repealed by Public Health Act 1997 (No. 69))
Drugs of Dependence Ordinance 1989 or the Drugs of Dependence Act 1989	No. 11 of 1989	15 March 1989
An Ordinance to prohibit or regulate the manufacture, sale, supply, possession, use and administration of certain drugs of dependence and other substances, and for related purposes.
Poisons (Amendment) Ordinance 1989 or the Poisons (Amendment) Act 1989 (repealed)	No. 12 of 1989	15 March 1989
An Ordinance to amend the Poisons and Dangerous Drugs Ordinance 1933. (Note: Poisons and Dangerous Drugs Ordinance 1933 (No. 37)) (Repealed by Statute Law Amendment Act 2000 (No. 80))
Poisons and Drugs (Amendment) Ordinance 1989 or the Poisons and Drugs (Amendment) Act 1989 (repealed)	No. 13 of 1989	15 March 1989
An Ordinance to amend the Poisons and Narcotic Drugs Ordinance 1978. (Note: Poisons and Narcotic Drugs Ordinance 1978 (No. 38)) (Repealed by Statute Law Amendment Act 2000 (No. 80))
Drug Laws (Consequential Amendments) Ordinance 1989 or the Drug Laws (Consequential Amendments) Act 1989 (repealed)	No. 14 of 1989	15 March 1989
An Ordinance to amend 3 Ordinances consequentially upon the making of the Drugs of Dependence Ordinance 1989 (Note: Drugs of Dependence Ordinance 1989 (No. 11)) and the Poisons and Drugs (Amendment) Ordinance 1989 (Note: Poisons and Drugs (Amendment) Ordinance 1989 (No. 13)). (Repealed by Statute Law Amendment Act 2000 (No. 80))
Payroll Tax (Amendment) Ordinance 1989 or the Payroll Tax (Amendment) Act 1989 (repealed)	No. 15 of 1989	22 March 1989
An Ordinance to amend the Payroll Tax Ordinance 1987. (Note: Payroll Tax Ordinance 1987 (No. 40)) (Repealed by Statute Law Amendment Act 2000 (No. 80))
Wills (Amendment) Ordinance 1989 or the Wills (Amendment) Act 1989 (repealed)	No. 16 of 1989	22 March 1989
An Ordinance to amend the Wills Ordinance 1968. (Note: Wills Ordinance 1968 (No. 11)) (Repealed by Statute Law Amendment Act 2000 (No. 80))
Administration and Probate (Amendment) Ordinance 1989 or the Administration and Probate (Amendment) Act 1989 (repealed)	No. 17 of 1989	22 March 1989
An Ordinance to amend the Administration and Probate Ordinance 1929. (Note: Administration and Probate Ordinance 1929 (No. 18)) (Repealed by Statute Law Amendment Act 2000 (No. 80))
Family Provision (Amendment) Ordinance 1989 or the Family Provision (Amendment) Act 1989 (repealed)	No. 18 of 1989	22 March 1989
An Ordinance to amend the Family Provision Ordinance 1969. (Note: Family Provision Ordinance 1969 (No. 15)) (Repealed by Statute Law Amendment Act 2000 (No. 80))
Administration and Probate (Amendment) Ordinance (No. 2) 1989 or the Administration and Probate (Amendment) Act (No. 2) 1989 (repealed)	No. 19 of 1989	22 March 1989
An Ordinance to amend the Administration and Probate Ordinance 1929. (Repealed by Statute Law Amendment Act 2000 (No. 80))
Taxation (Administration) (Amendment) Ordinance 1989 or the Taxation (Administration) (Amendment) Act 1989 (repealed)	No. 20 of 1989	11 April 1989
An Ordinance to amend the Taxation (Administration) Ordinance 1987. (Note: Taxation (Administration) Ordinance 1987 (No. 41)) (Repealed by Taxation Administration (Consequential and Transitional Provisions) Act 1999 (No. 5))
Self-Government (Citation of Laws) Ordinance 1989 or the Self-Government (Citation of Laws) Act 1989 (repealed)	No. 21 of 1989	3 May 1989
An Ordinance to amend certain laws with respect to the citation of laws consequential upon the establishment of the Territory as a body politic under the Crown. (Repealed by Law Reform (Miscellaneous Provisions) Act 1999 (No. 66))
Interpretation (Amendment) Ordinance 1989 or the Interpretation (Amendment) Act 1989 (repealed)	No. 22 of 1989	3 May 1989
An Ordinance to amend the Interpretation Ordinance 1967 (Note: Interpretation Ordinance 1967 (No. 48)) consequential upon the establishment of the Territory as a body politic under the Crown and for other purposes. (Repealed by Statute Law Amendment Act 2000 (No. 80))
Self-Government (Transitional Provisions) Ordinance 1989 or the Self-Government (Transitional Provisions) Act 1989 (repealed)	No. 23 of 1989	3 May 1989
An Ordinance to make certain transitional provisions consequential upon the establishment of the Territory as a body politic under the Crown. (Repealed by Statute Law Amendment Act 2001 (No. 2) (No. 56))
Subordinate Laws Ordinance 1989 or the Subordinate Laws Act 1989 (repealed)	No. 24 of 1989	3 May 1989
An Ordinance relating to subordinate laws consequential upon the establishment of the Territory as a body politic under the Crown. (Repealed by Legislation (Consequential Provisions) Act 2001 (No. 15))
Reserved Laws (Interpretation) Ordinance 1989 (repealed)	No. 25 of 1989	3 May 1989
An Ordinance to provide for the interpretation of reserved laws and for related purposes. (Repealed by Legislation (Deferral of Sunsetting—ACT Self‑Government Instruments) Certificate 2019 (Cth))
Public Service Ordinance 1989 or the Public Service Act 1989 (repealed)	No. 26 of 1989	3 May 1989
An Ordinance relating to the constitution and operation of the Australian Capital Territory Public Service. (Repealed by Public Sector Management (Consequential and Transitional Provisions) Act 1994 (No. 38))
Administrative Heads (Tenure of Office) Ordinance 1989 or the Administrative Heads (Tenure of Office) Act 1989 (repealed)	No. 27 of 1989	3 May 1989
An Ordinance relating to the tenure of office of the Head of Administration and Associate Heads of Administration. (Repealed by Public Sector Management (Consequential and Transitional Provisions) Act 1994 (No. 38))
Electricity and Water (Amendment) Ordinance 1989 or the Electricity and Water (Amendment) Act 1989 (repealed)	No. 28 of 1989	3 May 1989
An Ordinance to amend the Electricity and Water Ordinance 1988. (Note: Electricity and Water Ordinance 1988 (No. 30)) (Repealed by Statute Law Amendment Act 2000 (No. 80))
Registration of Births, Deaths and Marriages (Amendment) Ordinance 1989 or the Registration of Births, Deaths and Marriages (Amendment) Act 1989 (repealed)	No. 29 of 1989	3 May 1989
An Ordinance to amend the Registration of Births, Deaths and Marriages Ordinance 1963. (Note: Registration of Births, Deaths and Marriages Ordinance 1963 (No. 17)) (Repealed by Births, Deaths and Marriages Registration Act 1997 (No. 112))
Evidence (Laws and Instruments) Ordinance 1989 or the Evidence (Laws and Instruments) Act 1989 (repealed)	No. 30 of 1989	10 May 1989
An Ordinance to facilitate the proof of certain laws, instruments and other matters. (Repealed by Evidence (Amendment) Act (No 2) 1993 (No. 62))
Public Place Names Ordinance 1989 or the Public Place Names Act 1989	No. 31 of 1989	10 May 1989
An Ordinance to provide for the naming of divisions and public places.
Teaching Service (Consequential Modifications) Ordinance 1989 or the Teaching Service (Consequential Modifications) Act 1989 (repealed)	No. 32 of 1989	10 May 1989
An Ordinance to modify the Commonwealth Teaching Service Act 1972 (Note: Commonwealth Teaching Service Act 1972 (Cth)) being modifications made under section 8 of the A.C.T. Self-Government (Consequential Provisions) Act 1988. (Note: A.C.T. Self-Government (Consequential Provisions) Act 1988 (No. 109 (Cth)))
Administrative Decisions (Judicial Review) Ordinance 1989 or the Administrative Decisions (Judicial Review) Act 1989	No. 33 of 1989	10 May 1989
An Ordinance relating to the review on questions of law of certain administrative decisions.
Crimes (Offences against the Government) Ordinance 1989 or the Crimes (Offences against the Government) Act 1989 (repealed)	No. 34 of 1989	10 May 1989
An Ordinance relating to offences against the government of the Territory and to related matters. (Repealed by Criminal Code (Theft, Fraud, Bribery and Related Offences) Amendment Act 2004 (No. 15))
Crown Suits Ordinance 1989 or the Crown Suits Act 1989 (repealed)	No. 35 of 1989	10 May 1989
An Ordinance relating to suits to which the Territory is a party and to other matters. (Repealed by Crown Proceedings Act 1992 (No. 60)
Government Solicitor Ordinance 1989 or the Government Solicitor Act 1989 (repealed)	No. 36 of 1989	10 May 1989
An Ordinance to establish a Government Solicitor for the Australian Capital Territory and for related purposes. (Repealed by Law Officers Act 2011 (No. 30))
Audit Ordinance 1989 or the Audit Act 1989 (repealed)	No. 37 of 1989	10 May 1989
An Ordinance to provide for the collection and payment of the public moneys, the audit of the public accounts and the protection and recovery of public property, and for other purposes. (Repealed by Financial Management and Audit (Consequential and Transitional Provisions) Act 1996 (No. 26))
Self-Government (Consequential Amendments) Ordinance 1989 or the Self-Government (Consequential Amendments) Act 1989 (repealed)	No. 38 of 1989	10 May 1989
An Ordinance to amend certain laws of the Territory consequent upon the establishment of the Territory as a body politic under the Crown and for other purposes. (Repealed by Statute Law Amendment Act 2000 (No. 80)
National Land Ordinance 1989 (repealed)	No. 39 of 1989	10 May 1989
An Ordinance relating to National Land. (Repealed by Australian Capital Territory National Land (Leased) Ordinance 2022 (No. 2))
National Memorials (Amendment) Ordinance 1989 (repealed)	No. 40 of 1989	10 May 1989
An Ordinance to amend the National Memorials Ordinance 1928. (Note: National Memorials Ordinance 1928 (No. 18)) (Repealed by Infrastructure and Regional Development (Spent and Redundant Instruments) Repeal Regulation 2014 (Cth))
Administration Ordinance 1989 or the Administration Act 1989 (repealed)	No. 41 of 1989	10 May 1989
An Ordinance to provide for the exercise and delegation of certain powers consequentially upon the establishment of the Territory as a body politic under the Crown. (Repealed by Legislation Amendment Act 2002 (No. 11))
Reserved Laws (Administration) Ordinance 1989 (repealed)	No. 42 of 1989	10 May 1989
An Ordinance to provide for the administration of the reserved laws of the Territory consequentially upon its establishment as a body politic under the Crown. (Repealed by Legislation (Deferral of Sunsetting—ACT Self‑Government Instruments) Certificate 2019 (Cth))
Seat of Government (Administration) (Repeal) Ordinance 1989 or the Seat of Government (Administration) (Repeal) Act 1989 (repealed)	No. 43 of 1989	10 May 1989
An Ordinance to repeal the Seat of Government (Administration) Ordinance 1930 (Note: Seat of Government (Administration) Ordinance 1930 (No. 5)) consequentially upon the establishment of the Territory as a body politic under the Crown. (Repealed by Statute Law Revision (Miscellaneous Provisions) Act 1992 (No. 23))
Justices of the Peace Ordinance 1989 or the Justices of the Peace Act 1989	No. 44 of 1989	10 May 1989
An Ordinance to provide for the appointment of justices of the peace consequentially upon the repeal of the Seat of Government (Administration) Ordinance 1930.
Ombudsman Ordinance 1989 or the Ombudsman Act 1989	No. 45 of 1989	10 May 1989
An Ordinance to provide for the appointment of an Australian Capital Territory Ombudsman and to define the functions and powers of that office.
Freedom of Information Ordinance 1989 or the Freedom of Information Act 1989 (repealed)	No. 46 of 1989	10 May 1989
An Ordinance to give members of the public rights of access to official documents of the Territory. (Repealed by Freedom of Information Act 2016 (No. 55))
Publications Control Ordinance 1989 or the Publications Control Act 1989 (repealed)	No. 47 of 1989	10 May 1989
An Ordinance to provide for the control of publications and for related purposes. (Repealed by Repealed by Classification (Publications, Films and Computer Games) (Enforcement) Act 1995 (No. 47))
Classification of Publications (Amendment) Ordinance (No. 2) 1989	No. 48 of 1989	10 May 1989
An Ordinance to amend the Classification of Publications Ordinance 1983 and for a related purpose.
Remuneration (Repeal) Ordinance 1989 or the Remuneration (Repeal) Act 1989 (repealed)	No. 49 of 1989	10 May 1989
An Ordinance to repeal the Remuneration Ordinance 1976. (Note: Remuneration Ordinance 1976 (No. 62)) (Repealed by Statute Law Revision (Miscellaneous Provisions) Act 1992 (No. 23))
Remuneration (Miscellaneous Amendments) Ordinance 1989 or the Remuneration (Miscellaneous Amendments) Act 1989 (repealed)	No. 50 of 1989	10 May 1989
An Ordinance to amend certain Ordinances in relation to remuneration. (Repealed by Statute Law Amendment Act 2000 (No. 80))
Administrative Appeals Tribunal Ordinance 1989 or the Administrative Appeals Tribunal Act 1989 (repealed)	No. 51 of 1989	10 May 1989
An Ordinance to establish an Administrative Appeals Tribunal for the Australian Capital Territory. (Repealed by ACT Civil and Administrative Tribunal Act 2008 (No. 35))
Sale of Goods (Vienna Convention) (Amendment) Ordinance 1989 or the Sale of Goods (Vienna Convention) (Amendment) Act 1989 (repealed)	No. 52 of 1989	10 May 1989
An Ordinance to amend the Sale of Goods (Vienna Convention) Ordinance 1987. (Note: Sale of Goods (Vienna Convention) Ordinance 1987 (No. 11)) (Repealed by Statute Law Amendment Act 2000 (No. 80))
Evidence (Closed Circuit Television) Ordinance 1989	No. 53 of 1989	28 June 1989
An Ordinance to provide for evidence given by a child in certain proceedings to be observed and heard on a closed circuit television system.
Small Claims (Amendment) Ordinance 1989 or the Small Claims (Amendment) Act 1989 (repealed)	No. 54 of 1989	30 June 1989
An Ordinance to amend the Small Claims Ordinance 1974. (Note: Small Claims Ordinance 1974 (No. 6)) (Repealed by Magistrates Court (Civil Jurisdiction) (Amendment) Act 1997 (No. 94))
Magistrates Court (Amendment) Ordinance 1989 or the Magistrates Court (Amendment) Act 1989 (repealed)	No. 55 of 1989	30 June 1989
An Ordinance to amend the Magistrates Court Ordinance 1930. (Note: Court of Petty Sessions Ordinance (No. 2) 1930 (No. 21)) (Repealed by Statute Law Amendment Act 2000 (No. 80))
Magistrates Court (Civil Jurisdiction) (Amendment) Ordinance 1989 or the Magistrates Court (Civil Jurisdiction) (Amendment) Act 1989 (repealed)	No. 56 of 1989	19 July 1989
An Ordinance to amend the Magistrates Court (Civil Jurisdiction) Ordinance 1982. (Note: Magistrates Court (Civil Jurisdiction) Ordinance 1982 (No. 54)) (Repealed by Statute Law Amendment Act 2000 (No. 80))
Reserved Laws (Administration) (Amendment) Ordinance 1989 (repealed)	No. 57 of 1989	30 August 1989
An Ordinance to amend the Reserved Laws (Administration) Ordinance 1989. (Note: Reserved Laws (Administration) Ordinance 1989 (No. 42)) (Repealed by Infrastructure and Regional Development (Spent and Redundant Instruments) Repeal Regulation 2014 (Cth))
Magistrates Court (Civil Jurisdiction) (Amendment) Ordinance (No. 2) 1989 or the Magistrates Court (Civil Jurisdiction) (Amendment) Act (No. 2) 1989 (repealed)	No. 58 of 1989	11 October 1989
An Ordinance to amend the Magistrates Court (Civil Jurisdiction) Ordinance 1982. (Repealed by Statute Law Amendment Act 2000 (No. 80))
Magistrates Court (Amendment) Ordinance (No. 2) 1989 or the Magistrates Court (Amendment) Act (No. 2) 1989 (repealed)	No. 59 of 1989	25 October 1989
An Ordinance to amend the Magistrates Court Ordinance 1930. (Repealed by Statute Law Amendment Act 2000 (No. 80))
Magistrates Court (Amendment) Ordinance (No. 3) 1989 or the Magistrates Court (Amendment) Act (No. 3) 1989 (repealed)	No. 60 of 1989	20 December 1989
An Ordinance to amend the Magistrates Court Ordinance 1930. (Repealed by Statute Law Amendment Act 2000 (No. 80))
Juries (Amendment) Ordinance 1989 or the Juries (Amendment) Act 1989 (repealed)	No. 61 of 1989	20 December 1989
An Ordinance to amend the Juries Ordinance 1967. (Note: Juries Ordinance 1967 (No. 47)) (Repealed by Statute Law Amendment Act 2000 (No. 80))
Classification of Publications (Amendment) Ordinance (No. 3) 1989	No. 62 of 1989	8 January 1990
An Ordinance to amend the Classification of Publications Ordinance 1983.

== See also ==
- List of acts of the Legislative Assembly of the Australian Capital Territory from 1989

== Sources ==
- "legislation.act.gov.au".
