= Karen Fryar =

Australian magistrate

Karen Fryar AM

Magistrate of the Australian Capital Territory
- In office 6 September 1993 – 8 March 2019

Personal details
- Born: 8 March 1956 (age 70)
- Education: Australian National University
- Occupation: Jurist

Karen Fryar AM (born 8 March 1956) is a former Magistrate of the Australian Capital Territory. She was sworn in as a Magistrate on 6 September 1993. She retired on 8 March 2019.

She is the first woman to be appointed as a magistrate in the Australian Capital Territory and also the first woman to be appointed as a judicial officer in the Australian Capital Territory.

== Early life ==
Fryar was born in Sydney, New South Wales, in 1956. She attended Albury High School.

She studied law and Japanese at the Australian National University.

== Career ==
Fryar worked as a solicitor after leaving university. She later worked in the public service at the Deputy Crown Solicitor's Office, the Attorney-General's Department and the Legal Aid Commission.

In 1993, Fryar was appointed as a magistrate and became the first female judicial officer in the Australian Capital Territory.

She became the co-ordinating magistrate of the Family Violence List and developed the Family Violence Practice Direction.

She was awarded the ACT International Women's Day Women's Award in 2008.

In 2010, she was appointed as a Member of the Order of Australia 'for service to the community of the Australian Capital Territory as a magistrate and through contributions to the prevention of family violence'.

== Personal life ==
She has a husband and children.
