= Coroners Court of Tasmania =

Tasmanian court

The Coroners Court of Tasmania is the generic name given to the Coronial Division of the Magistrates Court of Tasmania. It is a court which has exclusive jurisdiction over the remains of a person and the power to make findings in respect of the cause of death of a person, a fire or an explosion in Tasmania.

== History ==
The office of coroner in Tasmania derives from the legal framework inherited from the United Kingdom.

The first Governor of New South Wales, Arthur Phillip, was a coroner by virtue of his commission as governor. Similarly, Lieutenant Governors of Van Diemen's Land, which subsequently became the state of Tasmania, also had similar powers.

The lieutenant governor's commission also entitled him to appoint others as coroners as required, and this was most likely to have been to justices of the peace.

== Structure and Jurisdiction ==
Coroners have the power to investigate the causes of death within their jurisdiction. They also have power to retain a person’s remain, order autopsies, and direct how a person’s remains may be disposed of. In Tasmania, they have jurisdiction over fires and explosions, a function which coroners in the United Kingdom did not have.

Where a serious criminal offence has been disclosed during the course of an inquest or an inquiry, the Coroner may refer that matter to the Attorney-General of Tasmania for consideration of the institution of criminal proceedings.

Generally there are no appeals from the decision of a coroner, although there may be provision for the Supreme Court of Tasmania of the Chief Magistrate of Tasmania to reopen an inquest or inquiry. There may also be power for the Supreme Court of Tasmania to grant prerogative relief in respect of the proceedings.

== State Coroner ==
Unlike other states in Australia, there is no specific requirement in Tasmania law to appoint a State Coroner. In Tasmania, the Chief Magistrate performs those functions. The Chief Magistrate has the function to oversee and co-ordinate coronial services in Tasmania, ensure that all deaths and suspected deaths concerning which a coroner has jurisdiction to hold an inquest are properly investigated, and ensuring that an inquest is held whenever it is required, and to issue guidelines to coroners to assist them in the exercise or performance of their functions.

The Governor may also appoint Coroners. All magistrates in Tasmania are coroners by virtue of their appointment as a magistrate.

The secretary of the Department of Justice may appoint a public servant to be a Chief Clerk or Coroner’s Associate.

Every police officer in Tasmania is a coroner’s officer.

== Caseload ==
In the financial year 2005-2006, the division of court had 636 deaths reported and held 14 inquests.

== See also ==
- List of coroners courts in Australia
