= Coroner's Court of South Australia =

South Australian court

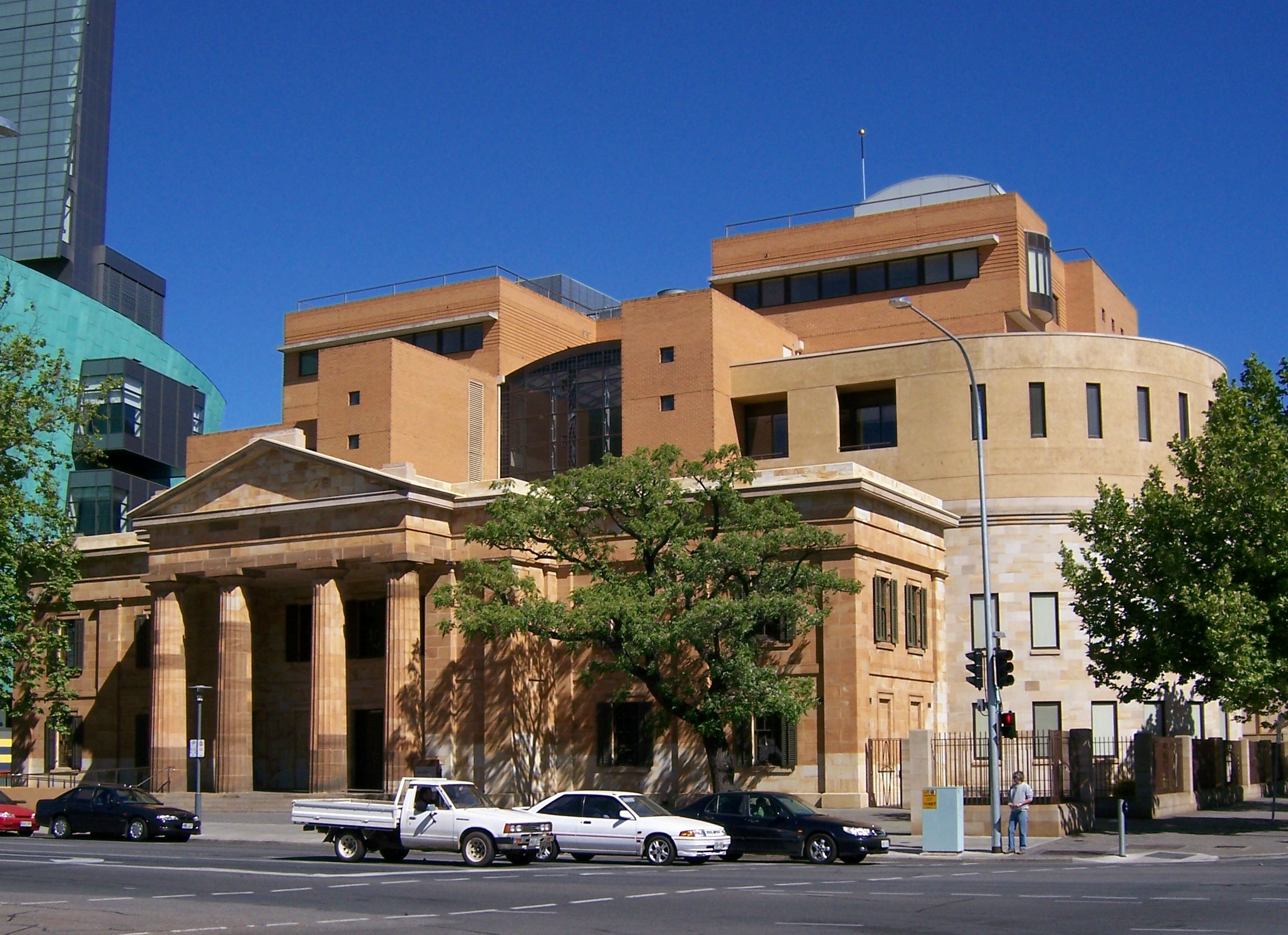
The Coroner's Court is housed in the Adelaide Magistrates' Court building.

The Coroners Court of South Australia is a court which has exclusive jurisdiction over the remains of a person and the power to make findings in respect of the cause of death of a person or fire in South Australia, a state of Australia.

== History ==
The office of coroner in New South Wales derives from the legal framework inherited from the United Kingdom.

The first Governor of New South Wales, Arthur Phillip, was a coroner by virtue of his commission as governor. As South Australia was formerly part of New South Wales, technically, Phillip would have been its first coroner.

== Structure and Jurisdiction ==
At common law, coroners would constitute a court by virtue of their office. In South Australia, this common law position has been abolished and there is now the Coroners Court of South Australia established. Coroners have the power to investigate the causes of death within their jurisdiction. They also have power to retain a person’s remains, order autopsies, and direct how a person’s remains may be disposed of.

South Australian coroners have jurisdiction to hold inquests concerning the cause of any fire in the state if the State Coroner or the South Australian Attorney General is of the view that an inquest should be held.

Where a serious criminal offence has been disclosed during the course of an inquest, the coroner cannot proceed with it if a person is to be charged with that criminal offence.

There may be a right of appeal from the findings of a coroner to the Supreme Court of South Australia.

== State Coroners ==
The Governor of South Australia may appoint a State Coroner for South Australia. The State Coroner has the function to oversee and co-ordinate coronial services in South Australia, ensure that all deaths and suspected deaths concerning which a coroner has jurisdiction to hold an inquest are properly investigated, and ensuring that an inquest is held whenever it is required, and to issue guidelines to coroners to assist them in the exercise or performance of their functions.

All magistrates are deputy state coroners by virtue of their office.

The State Coroner may delegate functions to a suitable person.

== See also ==
- List of coroners courts in Australia
