= List of acts of the Legislative Assembly of the Australian Capital Territory from 1989 =

This is a list of acts of the Legislative Assembly of the Australian Capital Territory for the year 1989.

== 1989 ==
Short title, or popular name	Citation	Notified
Long title
Supply Act 1989-90 (repealed)	No. 1 of 1989	30 June 1989
An Act to make interim provision for the appropriation of money out of the Consolidated Revenue Fund for certain expenditure in respect of the year ending on 30 June 1990, and for other purposes. (Repealed by Statute Law Amendment Act 2001 (No. 11))
Vocational Training Act 1989 (repealed)	No. 2 of 1989	10 July 1989
An Act relating to vocational training. (Repealed by Vocational Education and Training (Consequential Provisions) Act 1995 (No. 38))
Water Pollution (Amendment) Act 1989 (repealed)	No. 3 of 1989	10 July 1989
An Act to amend the Water Pollution Act 1984. (Note: Water Pollution Ordinance 1984 (No. 65)) (Repealed by Environment Protection (Consequential Provisions) Act 1997 (No. 93))
Nature Conservation (Amendment) Act 1989 (repealed)	No. 4 of 1989	10 July 1989
An Act to amend the Nature Conservation Act 1980. (Note: Nature Conservation Ordinance 1980 (No. 20)) (Repealed by Statute Law Amendment Act 2000 (No. 80))
Administration (Amendment) Act 1989 (repealed)	No. 5 of 1989	20 July 1989
An Act to amend the Administration Act 1989. (Note: Administration Ordinance 1989 (No. 41)) (Repealed by Statute Law Amendment Act 2000 (No. 80))
Public Trustee (Miscellaneous Amendments) (Amendment) Act 1989 (repealed)	No. 6 of 1989	20 July 1989
An Act to amend the Public Trustee (Miscellaneous Amendments) Act 1985. (Note: Public Trustee (Miscellaneous Amendments) Ordinance 1985 (No. 9)) (Repealed by Statute Law Amendment Act 2000 (No. 80))
Pesticides Act 1989 (repealed)	No. 7 of 1989	11 August 1989
An Act to regulate dealings with pesticides. (Repealed by Environment Protection (Consequential Provisions) Act 1997 (No. 93))
Film Classification (Amendment) Act 1989 (repealed)	No. 8 of 1989	11 August 1989
An Act to amend the Film Classification Act 1971. (Note: Film Classification Ordinance 1971 (No. 25)) (Repealed by Classification (Publications, Films and Computer Games) (Enforcement) Act 1995 (No. 47))
Police Offences (Amendment) Act 1989 (repealed)	No. 9 of 1989	6 September 1989
An Act to amend the Police Offences Act 1930. (Note: Police Offences Ordinance 1930 (No. 9)) (Repealed by Law Reform (Abolitions and Repeals) Act 1996 (No. 1))
Rates and Land Tax (Amendment) Act 1989 (repealed)	No. 10 of 1989	6 September 1989
An Act to amend the Rates and Land Tax Act 1926 (Note: Rates Ordinance 1926 (No. 6)) and for related purposes. (Repealed by Statute Law Amendment Act 2000 (No. 80))
Sewerage Rates (Amendment) Act 1989 (repealed)	No. 11 of 1989	6 September 1989
An Act to amend the Sewerage Rates Act 1968. (Note: Sewerage Rates Ordinance 1968 (No. 30)) (Repealed by Statute Law Amendment Act 2000 (No. 80))
Water Rates (Amendment) Act 1989 (repealed)	No. 12 of 1989	6 September 1989
An Act to amend the Water Rates Act 1959. (Note: Water Rates Ordinance 1959 (No. 19)) (Repealed by Statute Law Amendment Act 2000 (No. 80))
Electricity and Water (Amendment) Act (No. 2) 1989 (repealed)	No. 13 of 1989	9 October 1989
An Act to amend the Electricity and Water Act 1988. (Note: Electricity and Water Ordinance 1988 (No. 30)) (Repealed by Statute Law Amendment Act 2000 (No. 80))
Gaming Machine (Amendment) Act 1989 (repealed)	No. 14 of 1989	29 September 1989
An Act to amend the Gaming Machine Act 1987. (Note: Gaming Machine Ordinance 1987 (No. 34)) (Repealed by Statute Law Amendment Act 2000 (No. 80))
Powers of Attorney (Amendment) Act 1989 (repealed)	No. 15 of 1989	30 October 1989
An Act to amend the Powers of Attorney Act 1956. (Note: Powers of Attorney Ordinance 1956 (No. 17)) (Repealed by Statute Law Amendment Act 2000 (No. 80))
Water Supply (Chemical Treatment) Act 1989 (repealed)	No. 16 of 1989	24 October 1989
An Act to provide for the suspension of the operation of Part VIIIA of the Electricity and Water Act 1988 and for related purposes. (Repealed by Water Supply (Chemical Treatment) (Repeal) Act 1991 (No. 32))
Payroll Tax (Amendment) Act 1989 (repealed)	No. 17 of 1989	31 October 1989
An Act to amend the Payroll Tax Act 1987. (Note: Payroll Tax Ordinance 1987 (No. 40)) (Repealed by Statute Law Amendment Act 2000 (No. 80))
Occupational Health and Safety Act 1989 (repealed)	No. 18 of 1989	14 November 1989
An Act to promote and improve standards for occupational health, safety and welfare and for related purposes. (Repealed by Work Safety Legislation Amendment Act 2009 (A2009-28))
Legislative Assembly (Members' Staff) Act 1989	No. 19 of 1989	14 November 1989
An Act to provide for the employment of staff by Ministers, certain office-holders and members of the Legislative Assembly.
Motor Traffic (Amendment) Act (No. 3) 1989 (repealed)	No. 20 of 1989	14 November 1989
An Act to amend the Motor Traffic Act 1936. (Note: Motor Traffic Ordinance 1936 (No. 45)) (Repealed by Road Transport Legislation Amendment Act 1999 (No. 79))
Motor Traffic (Amendment) Act (No. 4) 1989 (repealed)	No. 21 of 1989	22 November 1989
An Act to amend the Motor Traffic Act 1936. (Note: Motor Traffic Act 1936 (No. 45)) (Repealed by Road Transport Legislation Amendment Act 1999 (No. 79))
Traffic (Amendment) Act 1989 (repealed)	No. 22 of 1989	22 November 1989
An Act to amend the Traffic Act 1937. (Note: Traffic Act 1937 (No. 32)) (Repealed by Road Transport Legislation Amendment Act 1999 (No. 79))
Acts Revision (Arrest Without Warrant) Act 1989 (repealed)	No. 23 of 1989	1 December 1989
An Act to amend certain Acts in relation to the power to arrest without warrant and for other purposes. (Repealed by Statute Law Amendment Act 2001 (No. 11))
Motor Traffic (Alcohol and Drugs) (Amendment) Act 1989 (repealed)	No. 24 of 1989	7 December 1989
An Act to amend the Motor Traffic (Alcohol and Drugs) Act 1977. (Note: Motor Traffic (Alcohol and Drugs) Ordinance 1977 (No. 17)) (Repealed by Road Transport Legislation Amendment Act 1999 (No. 79))
Appropriation Act 1989-90 (repealed)	No. 25 of 1989	1 December 1989
An Act to appropriate certain sums out of the Consolidated Revenue Fund for the purposes of the Territory in respect of the year that commenced on 1 July 1989, and for related purposes. (Repealed by Statute Law Amendment Act 2001 (No. 11))

== See also ==
- List of ordinances of the Australian Capital Territory from 1989

== Sources ==
- "legislation.act.gov.au".
