= George Ziziros Walker =

Australian businessman and casino operator (1910–1991)

- Born: George Ziziros; 5 February 1910; Sydney, New South Wales, Australia
- Died: 30 September 1991 (aged 81); Sydney, New South Wales, Australia
- Resting place: Eastern Suburbs Memorial Park
- Occupation(s): Businessman, casino operator
- Criminal charges: Keeping unlawful gaming house

George Ziziros Walker (5 February 1909 – 30 September 1991) was an Australian businessman and casino operator. He was a prominent figure in the illegal gambling industry, most notably, in owning the Goulburn Club as one of Sydney's largest illegal gambling houses. He was linked with many high-profile criminal and corruption investigations during the 1970s and 1980s, as well as notorious criminals such as Lenny McPherson and George Freeman.

== Career ==
=== Goulburn Club ===
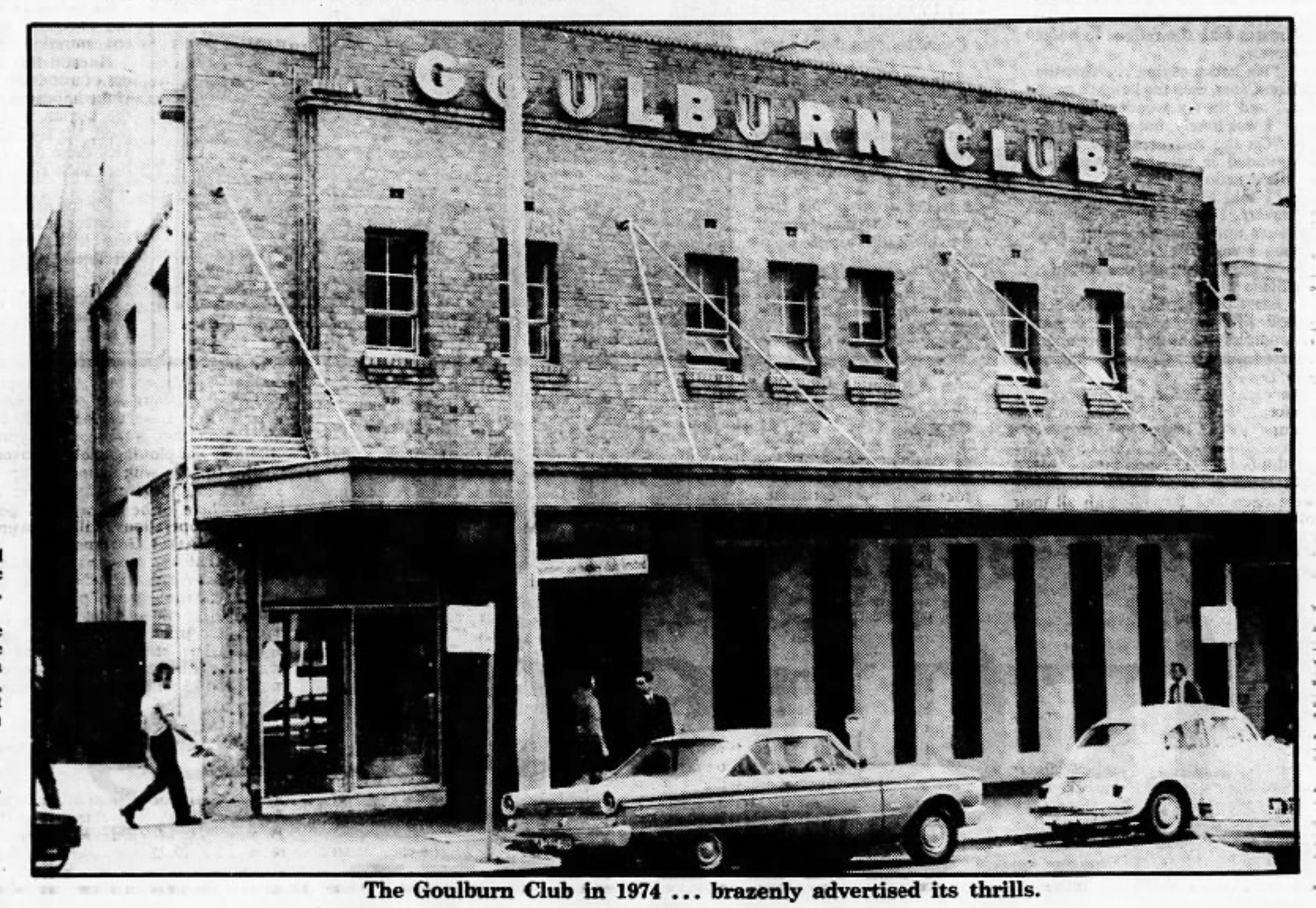
Photo of the Goulburn Club in 1974, as seen in The Sydney Morning Herald.

The Goulburn Club was an illegal gaming house owned by George Ziziros Walker for over 20 years. Located at 51-57 Goulburn Street, it was one of Sydney's largest and most infamous illegal casinos during the 1960s to the 1980s, located in the CBD. Started as a baccarat club, largely catering to ethnic clientele, by the late 1960s it had been transformed into an fully functioning casino. It was reported that roulette finished at 2 a.m. when green metal money boxes were transferred from the tables to a back-room; blackjack proceeded until dawn.

The Goulburn Club was named as a "hard-core" illegal casino by the New South Wales parliament in 1987. That same year, two police raids on the Goulburn Club in April and May resulted in over 100 arrests and more than $100,000 in cash and gaming equipment being confiscated.

=== Pine Lodge ===
In 1978, following a crackdown on illegal casinos in Sydney, where almost all had been shut down, George Ziziros Walker soon became involved with Stan Biggs and Peter Stewart Nelson, who founded the Pine Lodge in Canberra. The two had plants to convert Pine Lodge into a gambling house by attaining the necessary license, as Walker was looking to expand his business to the ACT, seeking to invest in a new venture, backed by $800,000, alleged to have come from organized crime syndicates in the United States through Lenny McPherson. During an investigation into the assassination of assistant commissioner Colin Winchester over a decade later, Nelson claimed that Walker bribed Winchester with a sum of $2000 for his assistance in obtaining a gambling license and protecting Pine Lodge from law enforcement scrutiny. Pine Lodge was subsequently denied its license, as a result of Walker's reputation, but illegal gambling nonetheless started six months later in Pine Lodge. Biggs mentioned to croupier Mario Cannistra that it was costing $2000 a week to keep the operation running, and it would cost them an extra $2000 for a roulette table.

=== Colin Winchester Investigation ===
Following the death of associate commissioner Colin Winchester in 1989, George Ziziros Walker was under investigation for his connection with Pine Lodge, for the purpose of understanding whether Winchester's death was linked to events at Pine Lodge. Walker was 80 at the time and in poor health, so his son, Michael Walker, was questioned instead.

Michael denied any allegations relating to his father's involvement in Pine Lodge and with Stan Biggs. He also said he "did not know if his father had operated illegal gambling operations in New South Wales with police protection." He further denied that neither he, his father, nor his uncle Nick Ziziros had ever visited Pine Lodge and met with Biggs; also dismissing claims that he eventually took over negotiations with Biggs, from his father.

Former Pine Lodge croupier Mario Cannistra, when asked for his opinion during the inquest, stated that he believed there to be no correlation between Pine Lodge and Winchester's death.

Bob Bottom, an investigative journalist who specialized in organized crime, stated that Walker's involvement with police corruption is undeniable and that "if a junior officer had been harassing one of Walker's Sydney establishments, he would have been transferred to Tibooburra within a day." Published on the front page of The Canberra Times during the Winchester Investigation: ‘Asked whether Walker would pass a large sum of money to a police officer at a lunch in front of strangers, Mr Bottom said Walker had operated so blatantly in Sydney that a state politician used to go to the Goulburn Club, run by Walker, and pick up money in front of patrons.’

== See also ==
- Organized crime in Australia
- List of gangs in Australia
- Colin Winchester
