= Coroner's Court of Western Australia =

Court in Western Australia

Coordinates: 31.9558°S 115.8631°E

The Coroner's Court of Western Australia is a court which has exclusive jurisdiction over the remains of a person and the power to make findings in respect of the cause of death of a person in Western Australia.

== History ==
The office of coroner in New South Wales derives from the legal framework inherited from the United Kingdom. The first Governor of New South Wales, Arthur Phillip, was a coroner by virtue of his commission as governor. Similarly, Lieutenant Governors of Western Australia also had similar powers. The governor's commission also entitled him to appoint others as coroners as required, and this was most likely to have been to justices of the peace. In the 2000s the processes of the court were reviewed.

The first female appointee to the role of State Coroner was Rosalinda Fogliani in 2014. She oversaw significant cases related to deaths in 2017 relating to Aboriginal suicides in the Kimberley.

== Structure and jurisdiction ==
Coroners have the power to investigate the causes of death within their jurisdiction. They also have power to retain a person's remains, order autopsies, and direct how a person's remains may be disposed. Unlike coroners in other states, Western Australian coroners do not have jurisdiction to hold inquiries concerning the cause of any fire in the state.

Where a serious criminal offence has been disclosed during the course of an inquest or an inquiry, the Coroner may refer that matter to the Western Australian Director of Public Prosecutions for consideration of the institution of criminal proceedings. Generally there are no appeals from the decision of a coroner, although there may be provision for the Supreme Court of Western Australia to grant prerogative relief in respect of the proceedings.

== State Coroner ==
The governor of Western Australia on the advice of the Attorney-General of Western Australia may appoint a state coroner for Western Australia. The state coroner has the function to oversee and co-ordinate coronial services in Western Australia, ensure that all deaths and suspected deaths concerning which a coroner has jurisdiction to hold an inquest are properly investigated, and ensuring that an inquest is held whenever it is required, and to issue guidelines to coroners to assist them in the exercise or performance of their functions.

The governor on the recommendation of the attorney general may also appoint a deputy state coroner. Deputy state coroners may exercise any of the functions of the state coroner delegated by the state coroner to them. The governor may also appoint coroners and Coroner's registrars.

All coroners in Western Australia are magistrates by virtue of their appointment as a coroner.

== See also ==
- List of coroners courts in Australia

== General references ==
- Western Australia. Office of the State Coroner (1998), Annual Report of the Office of the State Coroner, Western Australia, Office of the State Coroner
