= List of coroners courts in Australia =

This list identifies the coronial jurisdictions of Australia's states and territories. Unlike some other common law countries, Australia does not have a single national coronial system; each state and territory operates its own Coroners Court under its own Coroners Act, though the systems share similar core principles inherited from English common law. Each court investigates "reportable deaths" occurring within its jurisdiction, which includes deaths where "the cause is unknown, there are violent/unnatural circumstances, the death is as a result of an anesthetic or medical procedure, the death occurred whilst held in care/custody, or the identity of the deceased is unknown".

== List ==
| Jurisdiction | Court | Established | Location | Chief/State Coroner | Legislation |
|---|---|---|---|---|---|
| New South Wales | Coroners Court of New South Wales | 1988 | Lidcombe | Magistrate Teresa O'Sullivan | Coroners Act 2009 (NSW) |
| Victoria | Coroners Court of Victoria | 1 November 2009 | Melbourne | Judge Liberty Sanger | Coroners Act 2008 (Vic) |
| Queensland | Coroners Court of Queensland | 1958 | Brisbane | Terry Ryan | Coroners Act 2003 (Qld) |
| Western Australia | Coroner's Court of Western Australia | | | | Coroners Act 1996 (WA) |
| South Australia | Coroner's Court of South Australia | 2005 | Adelaide | Magistrate Naomi Kereru | Coroners Act 2003 (SA) |
| Tasmania | Coroners Court of Tasmania | | | | Coroners Act 1995 (Tas) |
| Australian Capital Territory | Coroner's Court of the Australian Capital Territory | | Canberra | Lorraine Walker | Coroners Act 1997 (ACT) |
| Northern Territory | Coroner's Court of the Northern Territory | | | | Coroners Act 1993 (NT) |

== See also ==
- Inquest
- Coroner
- Courts of Australia
