= John Burns (judge) =

Australian jurist

The Honourable Justice John Burns

Additional Judge of the Supreme Court of the Northern Territory
- Incumbent
- Assumed office 18 May 2020

Justice of the Supreme Court of the Australian Capital Territory
- In office 1 August 2011 – 31 August 2021

Chief Magistrate of the Australian Capital Territory
- In office 15 December 2009 – 12 October 2011
- Preceded by: Ron Cahill
- Succeeded by: Lorraine Walker

Magistrate of the Australian Capital Territory
- In office 26 April 1990 – 14 December 2009

Personal details
- Born: John Dominic Burns
- Occupation: Lawyer; Jurist

John Dominic Burns is an Additional Judge of the Supreme Court of the Northern Territory, a former Judge of the Supreme Court of the Australian Capital Territory and a former Chief Magistrate of the Australian Capital Territory.

== Career ==
Burns was admitted to practice in 1981. He first worked at Legal Aid NSW. In 1983, Burns moved to Canberra and worked for the Deputy Crown Solicitors Office as a prosecutor. The following year he joined the Australian Government Solicitor. Burns then joined the firm Gallens Barristers and Solicitors in 1985 and shortly became a partner. He was called to the bar in 1989 and joined Blackburn Chambers. In 1990, Burns was appointed a Magistrate of the Australian Capital Territory and a Magistrate of the Norfolk Island Territory. After the retirement of Ron Cahill, Burns was appointed Chief Magistrate of the Australian Capital Territory on 15 December 2009. In July 2011, it was announced that Burns would be appointed to the Supreme Court. He was appointed a Judge of the Supreme Court on 1 August 2011. Burns served on the ACT Law Reform Advisory Committee. In May 2020 he was appointed an Additional Judge of the Supreme Court of the Northern Territory, before retiring from the ACT Supreme Court in August 2021.

== Notable Cases ==
Burns, while on the ACT Supreme Court, was the Sentencing Judge in the secret trial of Witness J, a former officer of the Australian Secret Intelligence Service (ASIS) who was convicted of using insecure channels to communicate classified information.

As an Additional Judge of the Supreme Court of the Northern Territory, Burns presided over the trial of police officer Zachary Rolfe, who was charged with the murder of Kumanjayi Walker after shooting and killing Walker while attempting to arrest him.
