= Lorraine Walker =

Australian judge

Chief Magistrate of the Australian Capital Territory Lorraine Walker

Chief Magistrate of the Australian Capital Territory
- Incumbent
- Assumed office 13 October 2011
- Appointed by: Simon Corbell
- Preceded by: John Burns

Acting Judge of the Supreme Court of the Australian Capital Territory
- Incumbent
- Assumed office 1 August 2019
- Appointed by: Gordon Ramsay

Magistrate of the Australian Capital Territory
- In office 19 July 2010 – 12 October 2011
- Appointed by: Simon Corbell

Personal details
- Born: United Kingdom
- Children: 4
- Education: University of Sydney
- Occupation: Lawyer; Jurist

Military service
- Allegiance: Australia
- Branch/service: Royal Australian Air Force

Lorraine Anne Walker is the Chief Magistrate of the Australian Capital Territory and was an Acting Judge of Supreme Court of the Australian Capital Territory.

She was sworn in as a Magistrate on 19 July 2010 and as Chief Magistrate on 13 October 2011. On 1 August 2019, Walker was appointed an Acting Judge of the Supreme Court for 12 months to establish the Territory's Drug and Alcohol Court.

She is the first woman to be appointed Chief Magistrate.

== Early life ==
Walker was born in the United Kingdom. She travelled between the United Kingdom and Australia as a child.

She studied at the University of Sydney.

== Career ==
After graduating, Walker enlisted in the Royal Australian Air Force as a legal officer.

She then worked in the United Kingdom as a prosecutor and defence lawyer.

In 1996, Walker returned to Australia and worked as a partner at Barker Gosling.

She then became a barrister in 2000 practising in the Australian Capital Territory.

Walker has served on the board of the ACT Law Society, the ACT Bar Association and the Canberra Institute of Technology. She has also tutored at the Australian National University.

In 2010, she was appointed to the Magistrates Court. In 2011, she was appointed Chief Magistrate. By virtue of her appointment as Chief Magistrate, she is also the Chief Coroner of the Australian Capital Territory.

In 2019, Walker was appointed to the Supreme Court as an Acting Judge to establish the Territory's Drug and Alcohol Court. As her appointment as an Acting Judge was only for one year, and she continued to formally hold the role of Chief Magistrate. Magistrate Glenn Theakston was appointed as Acting Chief Magistrate during her appointment to the Supreme Court.

== Personal life ==
She has four children and a partner. Her youngest son, Callum, regularly sits on the rugby bench.
