= Robert Cook (jurist) =

Australian magistrate

Magistrate Robert Cook

Magistrate of the Australian Capital Territory
- Incumbent
- Assumed office 11 September 2013
- Appointed by: Simon Corbell

Personal details
- Education: Queensland University of Technology
- Occupation: Lawyer

Military service
- Branch/service: Royal Australian Air Force

Robert Matthew Cook is a Magistrate of the Australian Capital Territory. He was appointed as a magistrate on 11 September 2013.

== Career ==
Cook first held positions as a dry-cleaner, waiter, barman and paperboy.

Cook then enlisted in the Royal Australian Air Force in 1976. He studied at the Queensland University of Technology while serving and eventually worked as a legal officer.

In 1996, Cook left the Royal Australian Air Force and became a solicitor in private practice. During this time, he was also the Vice-President of the Australian Industrial Relations Tribunal. From 2005 to 2010, he was also Deputy President of the ACT Racing Appeals Tribunal. He eventually became a partner in two separate major law firms.

He was called to the bar in 2010. He specialised in employment law as well as work, health and safety law.

The Attorney-General Simon Corbell announced in August 2013 that Cook would be appointed to the bench. He was formally appointed on 11 September 2013.

== Personal life ==
Cook is an active member of the rowing community in the ACT.
