= Glenn Theakston =

Magistrate of the Australian Capital Territory, Australia

Magistrate of the Australian Capital Territory Glenn Theakston

Acting Chief Magistrate of the Australian Capital Territory
- In office 1 August 2019 – 31 July 2020
- Appointed by: Gordon Ramsay

Magistrate of the Australian Capital Territory
- Incumbent
- Assumed office 30 May 2016
- Appointed by: Simon Corbell

Personal details
- Education: Macquarie University
- Occupation: Lawyer

Military service
- Branch/service: Royal Australian Air Force
- Years of service: 1993–Present
- Rank: Wing Commander

Glenn Sacha Theakston is a Magistrate of the Australian Capital Territory. He was appointed as a Magistrate on 30 May 2016 and Acting Chief Magistrate on 1 August 2019 following Lorraine Walker's appointment to the ACT Supreme Court as an Acting Judge.

== Career ==
In 1993, Theakston graduated from Macquarie University with a Bachelor of Laws and a Bachelor of Science.

In 1997, he worked at Legal Aid ACT as a solicitor.

Theakston was then appointed as National Coordinator of Counter-Terrorism at the Commonwealth Director of Public Prosecutions in 2006.

In 2012, Theakston was called to the bar. He practiced as a barrister in family and civil law in Canberra.

In August 2019, Chief Magistrate Lorraine Walker was appointed an Acting Judge of the Supreme Court for 12 months to establish the ACT's first Drug and Alcohol Court. Theakston was subsequently appointed Acting Chief Magistrate to fill the role in Walker's absence.

== Personal life ==
Theakston has been a reserve legal officer in the Royal Australian Air Force since 1993. He currently holds the rank of Wing commander.
