= Louise Taylor (jurist) =

Australian judge

Magistrate Louise Taylor

Magistrate of the Australian Capital Territory
- Incumbent
- Assumed office 10 September 2018

Personal details
- Children: 4
- Education: Australian National University
- Occupation: Lawyer, jurist

Louise Taylor is a judge of the Supreme Court of the Australian Capital Territory, appointed on 26 July 2023 and due to be sworn in during August 2023. Before this appointment, she has been a Magistrate of the ACT since September 2018. She is the first Aboriginal person to be appointed as a judicial officer in the Australian Capital Territory, and the first Indigenous woman to become a Supreme Court judge in Australia.

== Early life and education ==
Taylor grew up in inner-city Sydney. A Kamilaroi woman, her family was from the New England area of New South Wales.

She moved to Canberra during high school, where she also attended the Australian National University, graduating with a Bachelor of Arts as well as a Bachelor of Laws.

== Career ==
Taylor was admitted to practice as a solicitor and barrister in 2001. She first worked as a prosecutor with the ACT Director of Public Prosecutions, and also worked at the Commonwealth Director of Public Prosecutions. She then worked as a defence lawyer.

Between 2012 and 2014, Taylor worked on the inquiry into the conviction of David Eastman, leading to the finding that he had been wrongly convicted of the murder Colin Winchester, assistant commission in the Australian Federal Police, for which he was imprisoned for nearly 20 years before being acquitted.

In 2014, Taylor was appointed Deputy Chief Executive Officer of Legal Aid ACT.

She was appointed a magistrate on 10 September 2018, making her the first Aboriginal person to be appointed as a judicial officer in the Australian Capital Territory.

On 26 July 2023, Taylor was appointed as the 6th Supreme Court of the ACT judge, in doing so becoming the first Indigenous woman to become a Supreme Court judge in Australia. (Note: Warramunga man, Lincoln Crowley was the first Indigenous Supreme Court judge in Australia, after being appointed in Brisbane, Queensland in 2022.) She is due to be sworn in within weeks of her appointment.

== Other activities and roles ==
Taylor served as Chair of the Women's Legal Centre ACT for 10 years. She has also served as Chair of the ACT Ministerial Advisory Council on Women and the ACT Domestic Violence Prevention Council.

Taylor has served as a member of the Law Council of Australia's Indigenous Legal Issues Committee and as an Associate of the Indigenous Law Centre at the University of New South Wales.

== Recognition ==
Taylor received the ACT International Women's Day Award in 2009.

== Personal life ==
Taylor has a husband and four children.
