= James Douglas (judge) =

James S. Douglas (born 9 February 1950) is justice of the Supreme Court of Queensland in the Trial Division. He has sat on the court since 2003 and served between 2005 and 2010 as president of Alliance Française de Brisbane Inc. He was educated at Villanova College in Coorparoo. He is a graduate of the Law Faculties at University of Queensland and Cambridge University.

On 8 July 2021, Prime Minister Scott Morrison named him as one of the commissioners appointed to conduct a royal commission into defence suicides.
