= Colin Winchester =

Australian police officer

Colin Winchester APM
- Born: Colin Stanley Winchester; 18 October 1933
- Died: 10 January 1989 (aged 55); Deakin, Australian Capital Territory
- Cause of death: Assassination by gunshots
- Occupation: Assistant Commissioner of ACT Police
- Employer: Australian Federal Police
- Spouse: Gwen Winchester (d. 2015)

Colin Stanley Winchester APM (18 October 1933 – 10 January 1989) was an assistant commissioner in the Australian Federal Police (AFP). Winchester commanded ACT Police, the community policing component of the AFP responsible for the Australian Capital Territory. In 1989 he was assassinated by an unknown perpetrator.

== Background ==
Winchester, the son of a baker, worked as a miner near Captains Flat before joining the Australian Capital Territory Police Force in 1962, aged 29 years. The ACT Police and Commonwealth Police were merged in 1979 to form the Australian Federal Police (AFP).

== Murder ==
On 10 January 1989, at about 9:15 pm, Winchester was shot twice in the head with a Ruger 10/22 .22-calibre semi-automatic rifle fitted with a suppressor and killed as he parked his car in the driveway of his neighbour’s premises in Deakin, Canberra. Winchester is Australia's most senior police officer to have been murdered. At the time of Winchester's murder, it was alleged that Winchester was corrupt; the accusation being that he had handled bribes relating to an illegal casino in Canberra. However, an audit of Winchester's financial affairs after his murder revealed nothing untoward. There were also allegations of 'Ndrangheta or Mafia involvement in his murder. The story of Winchester's murder was dramatised in Police Crop: The Winchester Conspiracy.

== Murder suspects ==
=== David Eastman ===
Prior to Winchester's murder, David Harold Eastman, a 44-year-old former Treasury Department economist, had made threats against Winchester's life.

In 1995 Eastman was tried and convicted of the murder of Winchester and was sentenced to life imprisonment without parole. During the 85-day trial, Eastman repeatedly sacked his legal team and eventually chose to represent himself. Eastman also abused the judge during his trial, and during later legal proceedings and appeals. Subsequent to his conviction, Eastman continuously appealed against his conviction, attempting to win a retrial on the basis that he was mentally unfit during his original trial. On 27 May 2009, Eastman was transferred from the Goulburn Correctional Centre in New South Wales to the ACT's Alexander Maconochie Centre to see out his sentence.

A new inquiry relating to his conviction was announced in August 2012. In 2014, the inquiry, headed by Justice Brian Ross Martin, found there had been "a substantial miscarriage of justice", Eastman "did not receive a fair trial", the forensic evidence on which the conviction was based was "deeply flawed" and recommended the conviction be quashed. However Martin said he was "fairly certain" Eastman was guilty but "a nagging doubt remains".

In 2016 it was reported that the ACT Government sought a retrial of Eastman over the murder of Winchester; and that the legal proceedings had cost the ACT Government approximately A$30 million. Meanwhile, Eastman lodged a civil claim against the ACT Government seeking compensation for wrongful imprisonment; and on 14 October 2019 Eastman was awarded A$7.02 million in compensation.

On 22 November 2018, after a lengthy re-trial, Eastman was found not guilty of Winchester's murder.

=== Other suspects ===
In media reports following the quashing of Eastman's wrongful conviction and the subsequent retrial, it was reported that Winchester's death may be linked to connections associated with the 'Ndrangheta.

== Winchester investigation ==
=== Pine Lodge bribery allegations ===
Following Winchester’s death, and during the ensuing Winchester investigation, it was disclosed that the former operator of Pine Lodge, Stan Biggs, had allegedly told a business partner that Colin Winchester was being paid to look after them. Stan Biggs and Peter Stewart Nelson went into partnership in 1978, establishing Pine Lodge; and sought to expand into the gambling industry, looking to Winchester in assistance with their application for a licence and, as Nelson recounts Biggs’ saying, his ability to ‘cover them’ if needed. Nelson divulged that he had seen George Ziziros Walker, a prominent Sydney figure in illegal gambling, handing an envelope to Biggs, who later handed it to Winchester. The envelope was estimated to have contained approximately $2000. Walker was described, by Biggs, as being ‘the money man from Sydney’; and in 1978, a Sergeant Vincent of the ACT licensing unit alleged that he had been interested in Canberra and Pine Lodge as a new area to operate his illegal businesses from. After Pine Lodge’s gambling licence had been denied and strongly opposed by ACT authorities, it started illegal gambling operation six months later, of which Winchester was accused of accepting bribes to protect, during his posthumous investigation.

== Legacy ==
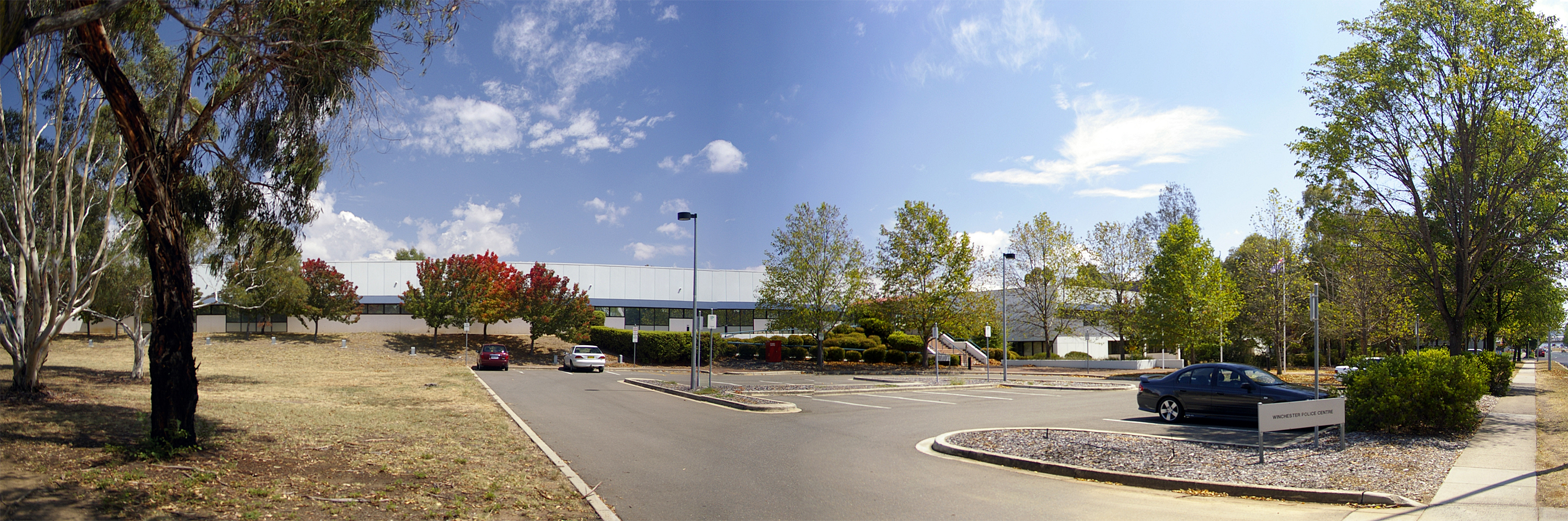
The Winchester Police Centre in Belconnen in 2009.

Following his murder, the Winchester Police Centre, located in Benjamin Way, Belconnen, was established in 1994 as the headquarters for ACT Police. The Winchester Police Centre houses ACT Police Executive, administrative and support sections and elements of the Territory Investigations Group (TIG).

Police appointments
Preceded by Val McConaghy	Chief Police Officer of ACT Policing; 1987–1989	Succeeded by Brian Bates
