= Margaret Hunter (jurist) =

Australian jurist

Special Magistrate Margaret Hunter OAM

Special Magistrate of the Australian Capital Territory
- Incumbent
- Assumed office 21 May 2014

Personal details
- Education: Australian National University
- Occupation: Lawyer; Jurist

Margaret Anne Hunter is a Special Magistrate of the Australian Capital Territory. She was appointed as a special magistrate and coroner on 21 May 2014.

She has been recognised with a Medal of the Order of Australia for her support of women in the legal profession.

Her work as a coroner has led to notable reforms of the health system in the Australian Capital Territory.

== Early life ==
Hunter studied at the Australian National University graduating with a Bachelor of Arts in 1991 and a Bachelor of Laws in 1992.

== Career ==
Hunter first worked as a nurse from 1978 to 1987. Hunter then worked as a prosecutor at the ACT Director of Public Prosecutions from 1994 to 2000.

She became a founding committee member of Australian Women's Lawyers in 1997.

In 2000, Hunter became a barrister in the Australian Capital Territory. She was appointed Principal Counsel Assisting the Coroner for the Australian Capital Territory in 2006.

On 12 September 2013, she received a Medal of the Order of Australia 'for service to the community, particularly through support for women in the legal profession.'

Hunter was appointed a special magistrate and coroner for the Australian Capital Territory on 21 May 2014 for a period of three years. She has since been reappointed.

In 2016, Hunter handed down findings in a coronial inquest which recommended changes to the medical prescription system in the Australian Capital Territory. These findings have led to reform by the government. Other recommendations have led to changes of policy at hospitals in the Australian Capital Territory.

== Personal life ==
Hunter is a breeder of cattle. She has won several awards, including at the Sydney Royal Easter Show.
