= Beth Campbell (jurist) =

Australian magistrate

Magistrate Beth Campbell

Magistrate of the Australian Capital Territory
- Incumbent
- Assumed office 5 August 1998

Personal details
- Born: Lisbeth Campbell
- Occupation: Jurist

Lisbeth Campbell is a Magistrate of the Australian Capital Territory. She was sworn in as a Magistrate on 5 August 1998.

She is the second woman to be appointed as a magistrate in the Australian Capital Territory.
