= Bernadette Boss =

Australian magistrate

Bernadette Boss CSC

Magistrate of the Australian Capital Territory

Magistrate Brigadier
- Incumbent
- Assumed office 11 June 2012

Personal details
- Education: University of Sydney; University of Westminster; University College London; University of New England
- Occupation: Army officer Magistrate; Barrister

Military service
- Allegiance: Australia
- Branch/service: Australian Army (1996–02); Australian Army Reserve (2002–)
- Years of service: 1996–present
- Rank: Brigadier
- Commands: Sydney University Regiment
- Battles/wars: International Force East Timor; War in Afghanistan; Iraq War
- Awards: Conspicuous Service Cross

Bernadette Carmel Boss, CSC is a Magistrate of the Australian Capital Territory, an officer in the Australian Army Reserve and a former barrister. She was appointed as a magistrate on 11 June 2012. In her military career, Boss was the first woman to be a commanding officer of the Sydney University Regiment and the first woman to conduct an inquiry into the combat death of a soldier.

Boss was appointed as the first (interim) National Commissioner for Defence and Veteran Suicide Prevention on 1 October 2020.

== Legal career ==
Boss holds a Doctor of Philosophy from the University of Sydney. She also holds a Bachelor of Science (Honours) in anthropology from London University, a Diploma of Law from the University of Westminster, a Masters of Public Policy from the University of New England, a Masters of International Law from the University of Sydney, and a Postgraduate Diploma in Strategic Studies from the Centre for Defence and Strategic Studies. Boss also qualified as a registered nurse at St Bartholomew's Hospital, London, and holds an ophthalmic nursing diploma from Moorefields Eye Hospital in London.

Boss was admitted to practice in the United Kingdom in 1992 and then in Australia in 1993. She then practised in England and Wales as a barrister and prosecutor.

In 2002, Boss began practising as a barrister. She began practising in the Australian Capital Territory in 2004. She served as vice-president of the ACT Bar Association. She was appointed a magistrate on 11 June 2012.

On 1 October 2020, Boss was named the first (as "interim") National Commissioner for Defence and Veteran Suicide Prevention. The Minister for Veterans' Affairs, Darren Chester, noted, “As a current Magistrate and Coroner in the Australian Capital Territory, Dr Boss has the skills and expertise to examine these tragic instances of ADF and veteran suicides to understand practical actions to reduce suicide risk.”

== Military career ==
From 1996 to 2002, Boss was a legal officer in the Australian Army. She was the first woman to be a commanding officer of the Sydney University Regiment. She was also the first woman to conduct an inquiry into the combat death of a soldier. Boss served from 1995 in the British Territorial Army, and has seen service in the Australian Regular Army and the Australian Army Reserve, including deployments to East Timor, Iraq, and Afghanistan. Boss was awarded the Conspicuous Service Cross for "outstanding achievement" in command of the Sydney University Regiment, and has served as the Army Adjutant General.

Boss holds the rank of brigadier in the Australian Army Reserve.
