= Peter Morrison (jurist) =

Australian jurist

Magistrate Colonel Peter Morrison

Magistrate of the Australian Capital Territory
- Incumbent
- Assumed office 14 February 2012

Personal details
- Occupation: Lawyer; Jurist

Military service
- Branch/service: Australian Army
- Rank: Colonel

Colonel Peter Morrison is a Magistrate of the Australian Capital Territory. He was appointed as a magistrate on 14 February 2012.

== Career ==
Morrison worked in Queensland as private lawyer for 26 years.

He was then a military judge and judge advocate in the Australian Defence Force. Notably, he was the judicial officer in the matter that ultimately saw the shortlived Australian Military Court ruled constitutionally invalid by the High Court.

Morrison was then appointed to the Magistrates Court of the Australian Capital Territory on 14 February 2012.
