= Inquest =

Judicial inquiry, particularly into the cause of a death

An inquest is a judicial inquiry in common law jurisdictions, particularly one held to determine the cause of a person's death. Conducted by a judge, jury, or government official, an inquest may or may not require an autopsy carried out by a coroner or medical examiner. Generally, inquests are conducted only when deaths are sudden or unexplained. An inquest may be called at the behest of a coroner, judge, prosecutor, or, in some jurisdictions, upon a formal request from the public. A coroner's jury may be convened to assist in this type of proceeding. Inquest can also mean such a jury and the result of such an investigation. In general usage, inquest is also used to mean any investigation or inquiry.

An inquest uses witnesses, but suspects are not permitted to defend themselves. The verdict can be, for example, natural death, accidental death, misadventure, suicide, or murder. If the verdict is murder or culpable accident, criminal prosecution may follow, and suspects are able to defend themselves there.

Since juries are not used in most European civil law systems, these do not have any (jury) procedure similar to an inquest, but medical evidence and professional witnesses have been used in court in continental Europe for centuries.

Larger inquests can be held into disasters, or in some jurisdictions (not England and Wales) into cases of corruption.

== History ==
The inquest, as a means of settling a matter of fact, developed in Scandinavia and the Carolingian Empire before the end of the tenth century. It was the method of gathering the survey data for the Domesday Book in England after the Norman Conquest. In his account of the culture of the Gauls (Commentarii de Bello Gallico VI.19.3), Julius Caesar mentions a very early use of the procedure: "if a matter comes into suspicion about a death, they hold an inquiry (a quaestio) concerning the wives in the method used for slaves, and if guilt is established, they kill the wives, who have been tortured, with fire and all torments."

== By region ==
=== Australia ===
Australia does not have a single national coronial system. Each state and territory operates its own Coroners Court under their own Coroners Acts, though the systems share similarities and core principles. Coroners are judicial officers who investigate "sudden, unexpected, violent and accidental deaths" and are responsible for "determining the facts of death including cause and circumstances, or manner, of death". An inquest is mandatory in some circumstances, such as persons in the care of the state or deaths in custody.

=== United Kingdom ===
==== England and Wales ====
In England and Wales, all inquests were once conducted with a jury. They acted somewhat like a grand jury, determining whether a person should be committed to trial in connection to a death. Such a jury was made up of up to twenty-three men, and required the votes of twelve to render a decision. Similar to a grand jury, a coroner's jury merely accused, it did not convict.

Since 1927, coroner's juries have rarely been used in England. Under the Coroners Act 1988, a jury is only required to be convened in cases where the death occurred in prison, police custody, or in circumstances which may affect public health or safety. The coroner can actually choose to convene a jury in any investigation, but in practice this is rare. The qualifications to sit on a coroner's jury are the same as those to sit on a jury in the Crown Court, the High Court, and the County Court.

Additionally, a coroner's jury only determines the cause of death; its ruling does not commit a person to trial. While grand juries, which did have the power to indict, were abolished in the United Kingdom by 1948 (after being effectively stopped in 1933), coroner's juries retained those powers until the Criminal Law Act 1977. This change came about after Lord Lucan was charged in 1975 by a coroner's jury in the death of Sandra Rivett, his children's nanny.

The charity Inquest looks at inquests concerning contentious deaths including those in places of detention, and has campaigned for reforms to the inquest and coroner's system in England and Wales.

==== Scotland ====
There are no inquests or coroners in Scotland, where sudden unnatural deaths are reported to, and investigated on behalf of, the procurator fiscal for an area. The procurator fiscal has a duty to investigate all sudden, suspicious, accidental, unexpected and unexplained deaths and any death occurring in circumstances that give rise to serious public concern. Where a death is reported, the procurator fiscal will investigate the circumstances of the death, attempt to find out the cause of the death and consider whether criminal proceedings or a fatal accident inquiry is appropriate. In the majority of cases reported to the procurator fiscal, early enquiries rule out suspicious circumstances and establish that the death was due to natural causes.

Deaths are usually brought to the attention of the procurator fiscal through reports from the police, the registrar, GPs or hospital doctors. However, anyone who has concerns about the circumstances of a death can report it to the procurator fiscal. There are certain categories of deaths that must be enquired into, but the procurator fiscal may enquire into any death brought to his notice.

=== United States ===
In the United States, inquests are generally conducted by coroners, who are generally officials of a county or city. These inquests are not themselves trials, but investigations. Depending on the state, they may be characterized as judicial, quasi-judicial, or non-judicial proceedings. Inquests, and the necessity for holding them, are matters of statutory law in the United States. Statutes may also regulate the requirement for summoning and swearing a coroner's jury. Inquests themselves generally are public proceedings, though the accused may not be entitled to attend. Coroners may compel witnesses to attend and give testimony at inquires, and may punish a witness for refusing to testify according to statute. Coroners are generally not bound by the jury's conclusion, and have broad discretion, which in many jurisdictions cannot be appealed. The effect of a coroner's verdict at common law was equivalent to a finding by a grand jury, whereas some statutes provide that a verdict makes the accused liable for arrest. Generally, the county or city is responsible for the fees of conducting an inquest, but some statutes have provided for the recovery of such costs. Whether the evidence presented at an inquest can be used in subsequent civil actions depends on the jurisdiction, though at common law, the inquest verdict was admissible to show cause of death. Coroners' reports and findings, on the other hand, are generally admissible.

A coroner's jury deemed Wyatt Earp, Doc Holliday, and their posse guilty in the death of Frank Stilwell in March 1882.

== Cultural references ==
- Agatha Christie's Hercule Poirot series features inquests several times. Her novel, The Hollow, is such an example.
- The Good Wife season 4 episode "Invitation to an Inquest" revolved around a coroner's inquest into the death of a judge.
- Da Vinci's Inquest was a long-running CBC drama featuring the Vancouver coroner, which shows several inquests over the course of the series.
- In the BBC drama Life on Mars, in the seventh episode of the first series, an inquest is carried out into the death of a prisoner in the police station.
- Jimmy McGovern's drama Accused features an episode in which an inquest is opened and adjourned by a coroner into a workplace death.
- Alfred Hitchcock's romantic suspense thriller Vertigo features a six-man jury inquest at Plaza Hall in San Juan Bautista across the plaza from Mission San Juan Bautista.
- Quincy M.E. showcased a coroner's inquest when the manner of death was in dispute.
- The Coroner season 1 episode "Confetti Heart" features an inquest into a police shooting.

== See also ==
- Public inquiry, a similar investigation with expanded scope, usually when many deaths occur
