= Magistrates Court of the Australian Capital Territory =

Court in Australia

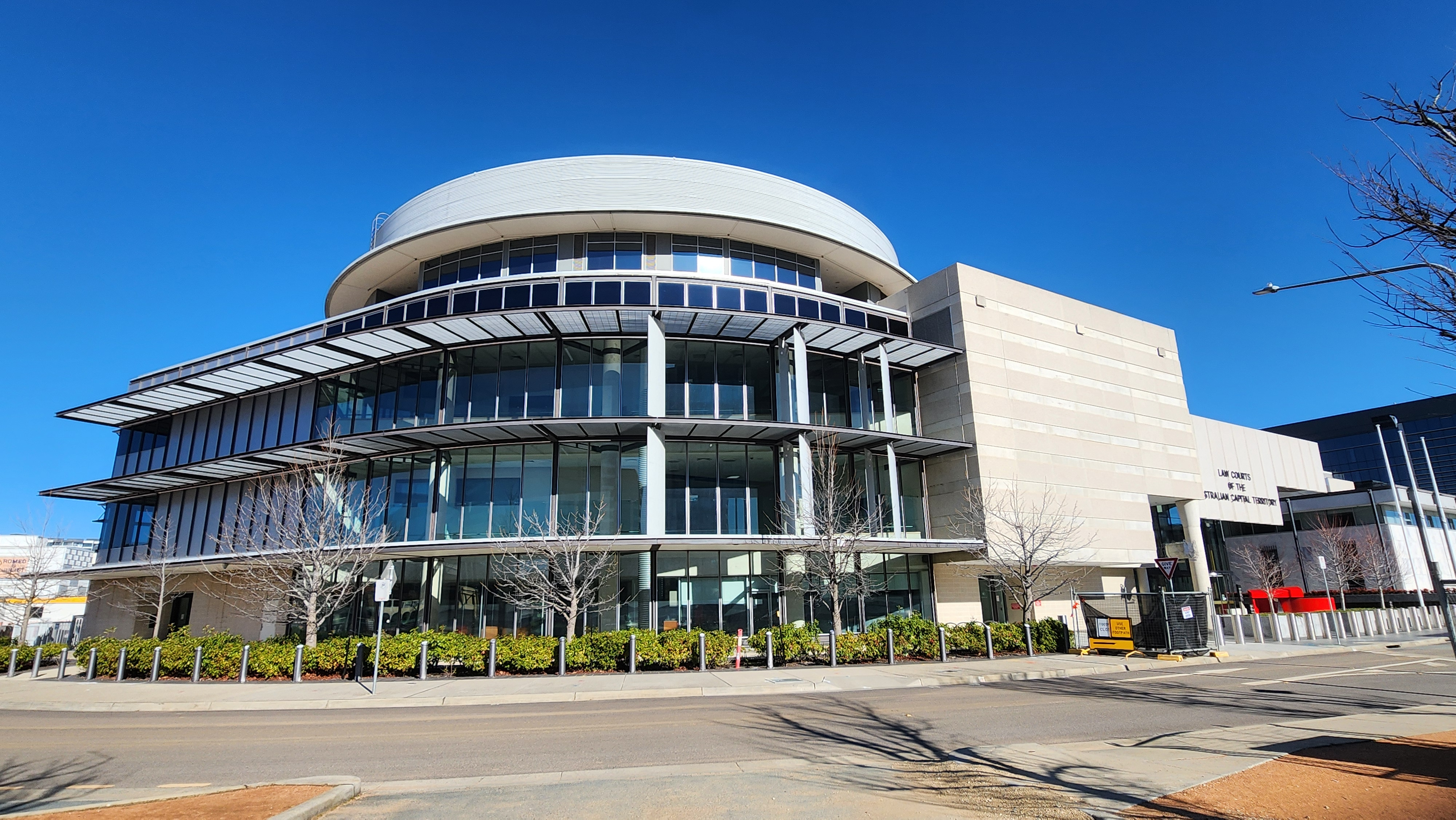
- The Magistrates Court Building located in Civic, Canberra, completed in 1996.
- Interactive map of Magistrates Court of the Australian Capital Territory
- 35.280385°S 149.127023°E
- Established: 25 November 1930 (as the Court of Petty Sessions); 1 February 1986 (as the Magistrates Court)
- Jurisdiction: Australian Capital Territory; Jervis Bay Territory; Australian Antarctic Territory
- Location: Canberra
- Coordinates: 35.280385°S 149.127023°E
- Composition method: Executive appointment following advice of the Attorney-General
- Authorised by: Australian Capital Territory Legislative Assembly via the Magistrates Court Act 1930 (ACT)
- Appeals to: Supreme Court of the Australian Capital Territory
- Judge term length: Mandatory retirement by age of 70
- Website: www.courts.act.gov.au/magistrates

Chief Magistrate
- Currently: Lorraine Walker
- Since: 13 October 2011

The Magistrates Court of the Australian Capital Territory is a court of summary jurisdiction that deals with the majority of criminal law matters and the majority of small civil law matters in the Australian Capital Territory, the Jervis Bay Territory and the Australian Antarctic Territory.

The current Chief Magistrate is Lorraine Walker, appointed with effect from 13 October 2011. However, Magistrate Glenn Theakston has been appointed Acting Chief Magistrate due to Walker's 12-month appointment as an Acting Judge of the Supreme Court. Currently eight magistrates and one special magistrate assist the Chief Magistrate in hearing matters before the Court.

The court is located on Knowles Place near London Circuit at Civic, in Canberra, in the ACT Law Courts building that it shares with the Supreme Court of the Australian Capital Territory opened in 2019.

== History ==
The court originated as the Court of Petty Sessions in 1930. It was the Territory's first court and Acton House was the first courthouse.

Previously, Territorians were required to travel to Queanbeyan, Goulburn or Cooma to have their legal matters heard. Under the Seat of Government Acceptance Act 1909 (Cth), state or federal courts had jurisdiction to settle legal disputes arising within the Territory. Due to the small number of matters that went before the Police Court in Queanbeyan and the District Court, this situation initially worked well.

In 1926, Robert Garran (then Secretary of the Attorney-General's Department) recommended building a permanent courthouse in the Territory or, if that was not economically viable, then temporary courtrooms. The Federal Capital Commission was unsympathetic to both suggestions. In 1929, Acton House was accepted by Attorney-General John Latham as a suitable building from which the Court of Petty Sessions could conduct legal proceedings. The building was refurbished and converted for court use the same year.

In July 1930, the Court of Petty Sessions Ordinance 1930 (No. 10) was gazetted; the Court of Petty Sessions was established on 25 November of that year. Despite the creation of the new court, the Territory still depended on visiting magistrates until 1949, when FC Keane was appointed as the Territory's first resident magistrate. Prior to this, magistrates appointed by the Government of New South Wales who also held permanent appointments in either Queanbeyan or Goulburn were responsible for the court. In 1974, Charles Kilduff became the Territory's inaugural Chief Magistrate.

In time, the court's civil and criminal jurisdiction increased. From a base of £200 in the early years, the court could then settle civil proceedings up to $50,000. And it could then deal with criminal offences that have a maximum penalty of two years' imprisonment or less and, with respect to Commonwealth matters, 12 months' imprisonment or less. This has since increased.

Like the Supreme Court, the Court of Petty Sessions occupied several locations including the Acton Hotel in 1940 and Civic in April 1946. It remained in Civic until 1963, when it relocated to the Law Courts Building it shared with the Supreme Court in Knowles Place, Civic. The building was officially opened by Prime Minister Robert Menzies on 8 May 1963. The Court of Petty Sessions was renamed the Magistrates Court on 1 February 1986.

By the 1980s, as the workload of both courts increased, problems with accommodating both the Supreme Court and the Magistrates Court in the one building became more apparent. Construction of a new Magistrates Court building, adjacent to the existing Law Courts Building, started in October 1994 and was completed in 1996.

In 2019, stage one of construction was completed on a new building that joins the Supreme Court and the Magistrates Court into one building known as the ACT Law Courts precinct.

== Jurisdiction ==
The territorial jurisdiction of the Magistrates Court encompasses the entirety of the Australian Capital Territory and the Jervis Bay Territory. Under the Jervis Bay Acceptance Act 1915 (Cth), the laws of the Australian Capital Territory apply in that particular area. Magistrates from the ACT travel to Jervis Bay Village on a regular basis to hold court for the region.

The Magistrates Court is established under, and has jurisdiction under, the Court of Petty Sessions Ordinance (No. 2) 1930 (No. 21), now renamed the Magistrates Court Act 1930 (ACT).

It has a summary jurisdiction to deal with most criminal offences. Criminal offences which carry a maximum term of imprisonment of two years or less, or for Commonwealth offences one year or less, must be heard by a magistrate. Some offences may be heard in either the Magistrates Court or the Supreme Court.

It also has jurisdiction to hear civil cases that are between $25,000 and $250,000 in value, although it cannot hear cases in which the title to land is in dispute. Any amount in dispute under $25,000 is dealt with by the ACT Civil and Administrative Tribunal.

It also has jurisdiction to deal with family violence orders, personal protection orders and workplace protection orders.

The Children's Court is a division within the Magistrates Court that hears matters involving children or young people, either for criminal matters or care and protection matters.

The Coroner's Court is another division within the Magistrates Court that investigates violent or unnatural deaths, suspicious fires and/or explosions, but it cannot make orders to punish offenders. All magistrates are coroners by virtue of their appointment and special magistrates may also be appointed coroners.

The Industrial Court is another division that has jurisdiction to deal with criminal and civil matters arising out of industrial or work safety contexts.

Magistrates are also justices of the peace by virtue of their appointment as a magistrate.

== Composition ==
The court is constituted by either magistrates or special magistrates. Generally, magistrates sit alone. A special magistrates may also constitute the court.

Magistrates and special magistrates are appointed by the executive. Magistrates and special magistrates must retire at 70 years of age.

The executive must also appoint a Chief Magistrate. The Chief Magistrate is responsible for the prompt discharge of the court's business, and may in consultation with a magistrate, decide the types of cases which a magistrate will hear.

== Membership ==
=== Chief Magistrate ===
Name	Date appointed	Term in office	Notes
Chief Magistrate Lorraine Walker	13 October 2011	14 years, 290 days	

=== Magistrates ===
Name	Date appointed	Term in office	Notes
Magistrate Beth Campbell	5 August 1998	27 years, 359 days	
Magistrate Peter Morrison	14 February 2012	14 years, 166 days	
Magistrate Bernadette Boss	11 June 2012	14 years, 49 days	
Magistrate Robert Cook	11 September 2013	12 years, 322 days	
Magistrate Glenn Theakston	30 May 2016	10 years, 61 days	
Magistrate Louise Taylor	10 September 2018	7 years, 323 days	
Magistrate James Lawton	6 May 2019	7 years, 85 days	
Magistrate James Stewart	6 May 2019	7 years, 85 days	

=== Special Magistrates ===
Name	Date appointed	Term in office	Notes
Special Magistrate Margaret Hunter OAM	21 May 2014	12 years, 70 days	

== Process ==
=== Commencing cases ===
Criminal cases are usually commenced by laying an information before a magistrate. An information is similar to a complaint or a charge. The magistrate may then either issue a summons for the defendant to attend court voluntarily or may issue a warrant for his or her arrest.

In serious cases, police officers may arrest a person and bring them directly before the magistrate. In any case, the person may be remanded in custody or may be released on bail. Depending on the seriousness of the crime, the magistrate may sentence the person if found guilty, or may commit the person for trial to the Supreme Court.

Hearings are heard in open court unless there is a law or a good reason for the matter to be heard in closed court.

=== Appeals ===
In certain circumstances, decisions made by the Magistrates Court may be appealed to the Supreme Court of the Australian Capital Territory. The Magistrates Court does not hear matters on appeal.

== See also ==
- List of Australian Capital Territory courts and tribunals
