= Fallen woman =

Old-fashioned term for a woman who had "lost her innocence"

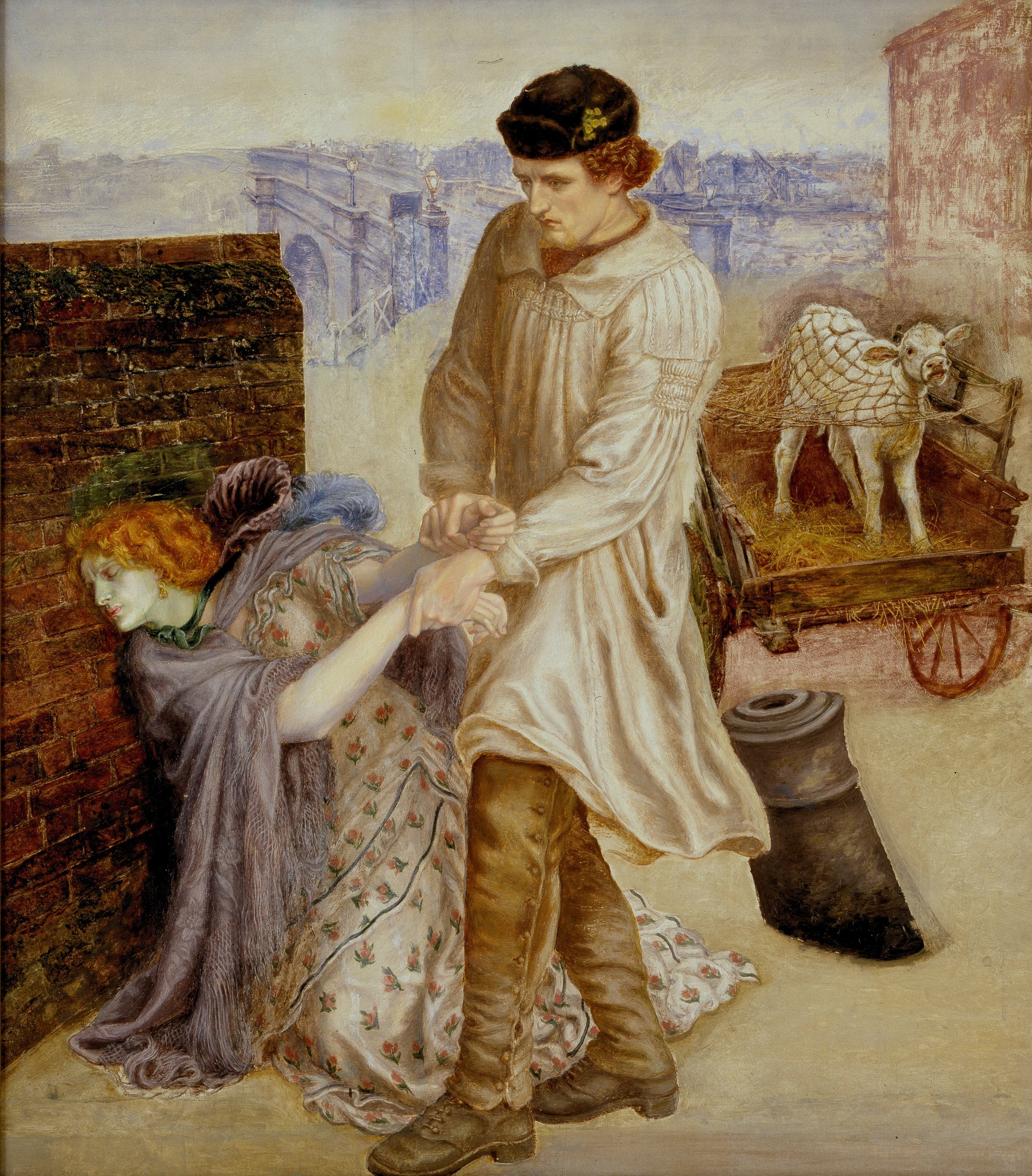
Dante Gabriel Rossetti. Found, (unfinished) (1865–1869) 'There is a budding morrow in midnight:'— So sang our Keats, our English nightingale. And here, as lamps across the bridge turn pale In London's smokeless resurrection-light, Dark breaks to dawn. But o'er the deadly blight Of love deflowered and sorrow of none avail, Which makes this man gasp and this woman quail, Can day from darkness ever again take flight? Ah! gave not these two hearts their mutual pledge, Under one mantle sheltered 'neath the hedge In gloaming courtship? And, O God! today He only knows he holds her;—but what part Can life now take? She cries in her locked heart,— 'Leave me—I do not know you—go away!' Dante Gabriel Rossetti: Found

"Fallen woman" is an old-fashioned term that was used to describe a woman who had "lost her innocence", and fallen from the grace of God. In 19th-century Britain especially, the meaning came to be closely associated with the loss or surrender of a woman's chastity and with female promiscuity. Its use was an expression of the belief that to be socially and morally acceptable, a woman's sexuality and experience should be entirely restricted to marriage. The term was often more specifically associated with prostitution, which was regarded as both a cause and effect of a woman's "fall". The term has considerable importance in social history and appears in many literary works.

== Theological links ==
The idea that Eve, in the biblical story in the Book of Genesis, was the prototypical fallen woman has been widely accepted by academics, theologians and literary scholars. Eve was not expelled from Eden because of sex outside marriage; rather she fell from a state of innocence because she ate forbidden fruit from the Tree of the knowledge of good and evil. In reaching for knowledge, Eve and then Adam disobeyed God and lost their original innocence, as shown by their sudden awareness of and shame at their nakedness. The temptation offered to Adam and Eve in the story was to know what God knows and to see what God sees, a temptation based on covetousness and a desire to be like God. (See: Prometheus) Thus, theologically speaking, the metaphor is related to the Fall of Man from a state of grace as well as to the expulsion and fall of Lucifer from heaven.

== Social situation ==
The term "fallen" was nevertheless most often conflated with sexual "knowledge" (i.e., experience), particularly for women at a time when the social value of their sexual inexperience was insisted upon. As the term narrowed to imply any socially unauthorized sexual activity, including premarital or extra-marital sex, whether initiated by the woman or not, it concealed the different reasons for such a "falling" out of God's and society's favor. "Fallen" was therefore an umbrella term that was applied to a variety of women in a variety of settings: she may have been a woman who has had sex once or habitually outside the confines of marriage; a woman of a lower socioeconomic class; a woman who had been raped or sexually coerced by a male aggressor; a woman with a tarnished reputation; or a prostitute. Furthermore, prostitution was defined in a range of ways and the "reality was that hard economic times meant that for many women, prostitution was the only way to make ends meet. Many ... were only transient fallen women, moving in and out of the profession [of prostitution] as family finances dictated."

In some cases, a woman may have been regarded as fallen simply because she was educated, eccentric, or elusive. Whatever the case may be, female fallenness as it appears in each of these renderings was the result of a woman's deviation from social norms, and in turn strongly linked to moral expectations. In the mid 19th century, for example, "For middle-class men seeking to establish a different basis for authority, from that which had been used by the nobility, moral authority became the key issue, evident in the power exercised by a man over the nuclear or bourgeois family and in his ability to regulate women's sexuality through her protection and containment in the domestic sphere."

Female dancers and performers have been regarded as deviating from social norms that expect women to stay away from the male gaze, and hence have been described as belonging to the class of "fallen women". In Europe, women dancers were not socially acceptable and in Arabia, "the unveiled ghawazi, who performed publicly for men, were not respected".

== Rescue and rehabilitation ==
One of the effects of the rapid urbanisation resulting from the Industrial Revolution in England was that a large number of prostitutes were working in the capital, London. This was assumed to be a large problem for the city and for the women themselves. Therefore, it prompted many rescue and rehabilitation efforts, especially by middle-class women inspired by religious conviction or egalitarian principles or both. Some people worked on changes to legislation or served on committees to raise funds for charitable initiatives. Josephine Butler, for example, in the context of her efforts against the Contagious Diseases Acts wrote:

You must know there are many good men and women in our country who have devoted their lives to the work of reclaiming prostitutes, and of offering protection and aid to women and young girls, who through poverty, ignorance, or evil companionship are in danger of falling into sin. And because several persons working together can do more than each working alone, societies have been formed for this purpose, one of which, the Rescue Society, has in the last seventeen years, opened the doors of its various Homes to no less than 6,722 fallen women and girls, of which number seventy out of every hundred have been restored to a virtuous life, whilst lack of funds has compelled it reluctantly to refuse admission to many others who implored its aid.

Many of the homes were "strict, punitive and vengeful" but Urania Cottage, set up and managed by Charles Dickens with the help of his rich, philanthropic friend Lady Burdett-Coutts was "more agreeable", run with "good sense and good will."

Most famously, the Prime Minister William Ewart Gladstone worked directly with fallen women to try to rescue them from their circumstances. At considerable risk to his political career, Gladstone spent a great amount of his own money and time on this effort, assisted by his wife, Catherine Gladstone. "There are more entries in Gladstone's diaries about prostitutes than there are about political hostesses, more recorded visits to the fallen women on the streets of London than recorded attendances at the balls and soirées of the grandes dames of polite Victorian society."

Rescue work among prostitutes was also part of the missionary work done by the Woman's Christian Temperance Union (WCTU), whose members also petitioned against alcohol and opium. In a speech to the First National Purity Congress, convened in 1895 by the American Purity Alliance, WCTU temperance campaigner and social reformer Jessie Ackermann said:

From time immemorial we have read of fallen and outcast women, forms of speech used only in reference to our sex. To my mind the time has now come when we should apply the same term to sinful man ... the great weakness of our rescue work in the past has been its onesidedness. It has busied itself in reclaiming women, while men have been passed by.

What "amounted to conventional Victorian 'rescue work' for 'fallen' women" was carried out in the Philippines during the Philippine–American War on behalf of the United States government as part of much broader "social purity" campaigns to prohibit prostitution and alcohol and other "social evils".

== In art and literature ==
As a genuine social concern as well as a metaphor for artistic explorations of vice and virtue, the theme of the fallen woman has a notable place in art and in literature. In some cases, such as Dante Gabriel Rossetti and William Blake, the artist/author has produced companion pieces in both forms. The theme continues in historical fiction such as John Fowles's The French Lieutenant's Woman.

=== John Milton ===
What fear I then, rather what know to fear
Under this ignorance of good and evil,
Of God or death, of law or penalty?
Here grows the cure of all, this fruit divine,
Fair to the eye, inviting to the taste,
Of virtue to make wise; what hinders then
To reach, and feed at once both body and mind?"
So saying, her rash hand in evil hour
Forth reaching to the fruit, she pluck'd, she eat.
...
In fruit she never tasted, whether true
Or fancied so, though expectation high
Of knowledge, nor was Godhead from her thought.

John Milton: Paradise Lost Book IX, lines 773–790

Aside from the Bible, it was John Milton's famous and influential poem Paradise Lost (1667) that communicated the story of the Fall and its consequences most powerfully. The idea of the fallen woman is most closely related to those sources which represent the fallen woman as an agent, as opposed to a passive participant, in the act of her undoing. For example, in "longing to reign rather than serve", Eve is ambitious for knowledge. The difference between these religious renderings of the iconic figure and the fallen woman presented in most 19th century texts is that the latter is suppressed, disempowered, and silenced in her representations: "[T]he Victorian fallen woman is usually depicted ... as a mute, enigmatic icon ... who sleeps through the poem that probes her nature".

=== Lord Byron ===
Where is honour,
Innate and precept-strengthen'd, 'tis the rock
Of faith connubial: where it is not - where
Light thoughts are lurking, or the vanities
Of worldly pleasure rankle in the heart,
Or sensual throbs convulse it, well I know
'Twere hopeless for humanity to dream
Of honesty in such infected blood,
Although 'twere wed to him it covets most;
An incarnation of the poet's god
In all his marble-chiselled beauty, or
The demi-deity, Alcides, in
His majesty of superhuman manhood,
Would not suffice to bind where virtue is not;
It is consistency which forms and proves it;
Vice cannot fix and virtue cannot change,
The once fall'n woman must forever fall;
For vice must have variety, while virtue
Stands like the sun and all which rolls around
Drinks life, and light, and glory from her aspect.

Lord Byron: Marino Faliero, Doge of Venice, Act II, sc. I, lines 378-398

Lord Byron uses the idea of the fallen woman to relate vice and virtue and consider the effects of infidelity and inconsistency in his poem Mariano Faliero, Doge of Venice.

=== William Blake ===
Does spring hide its joy
When buds and blossoms grow?
Does the sower
Sow by night,
Or the ploughman in darkness plough?

Break this heavy chain
That does freeze my bones around
Selfish! Vain!
Eternal bane!
That free love with bondage bound.

William Blake: "Earth's Answer" (one of the Songs of Experience) lines 16-25

William Blake's series of poems Songs of Innocence and of Experience (1789–1794) contrasts the two states in the context of industrialising England, the context in which women became more likely to "fall" as a result of great social change. Blake's poetry explores his deep concern about poverty and its effects as well as the relations between those in authority with those who are controlled by it, including moral generalities and the relations between the sexes. The connections between the Fall of Man and societal restrictions on sexual love are part of those broader concerns.

=== Pre-Raphaelite painters ===
The theme of the fallen woman was becoming increasingly popular at the time that Dante Rossetti began his picture Found. Conceived in 1851, it was described by his niece Helen Rossetti as follows: "A young drover from the country, while driving a calf to market, recognizes in a fallen woman on the pavement, his former sweetheart. He tries to raise her from where she crouches on the ground, but with closed eyes she turns her face from him to the wall."

William Holman Hunt, like Dante Rossetti a member of the Pre-Raphaelite Brotherhood, spent some time searching for a 'suitable' subject for his painting The Awakening Conscience and he "found it after reading about Peggotty and Emily in Charles Dickens's novel David Copperfield, and after frequenting the London streets where fallen women could usually be found."

=== Elizabeth Gaskell ===
The character of Esther, who becomes a prostitute in Elizabeth Gaskell's novel Mary Barton (1848) is an example of a fallen woman being used to illustrate the social and political divide between rich and poor in Victorian England. The novel is set in a large industrial town in the 1840s and it "gives an accurate and humane picture of working-class life ... Esther is presented as something other than merely a bad girl; the abyss into which she falls is the same gulf that separates Dives from Lazarus". In terms of the construction of the novel, the conventions of the time required that sexual actions took place offstage or not at all. Readers (particularly female readers) were encouraged to imagine and condemn the actions that caused the character's fall but as with other authors concerned about the effects of poverty on people at the time, especially women, Gaskell's "conscious aim is to bring Christian principles as a mediating force within class antagonisms."

=== Charles Dickens ===
Aside from the well known critiques of society in his novels such as David Copperfield, (1850), Charles Dickens set up and managed Urania Cottage—a home for homeless women. He disagreed with the prevailing idea that once corrupted, especially by prostitution, and therefore fallen, a woman could not be uncorrupted or redeemed. Rather he wanted to treat them well and train them for other employment but he needed to convince his benefactor that it was possible for fallen women to return to mainstream life.

=== Thomas Hardy ===
Thomas Hardy's novel Tess of the d'Urbervilles (1891) explores the consequences for a heroine who became a fallen woman as a result of being raped. This is a key point because the author is trying to show that the consequences are independent of the heroine's actions or intentions. In his poem "The Ruined Maid" Hardy takes a more ironic view of the fallen woman.

=== George Moore ===
Written somewhat in reaction to Thomas Hardy's Tess of the d'Urbervilles, George Moore's 1894 novel Esther Waters deals with the experiences of a kitchen maid in a large house who is seduced and then abandoned by one of the footmen. In the face of great challenges, she manages to raise her child as a single mother.

=== Leo Tolstoy ===
In Leo Tolstoy's 1899 novel Resurrection, the origin of the narrative is the rape of the orphaned serf Katerina Maslova by the wealthy nephew of her two guardians/employers. Tolstoy uses the sequence of misfortunes that result from her pregnancy to write a critique of late Imperial Russian society, focusing particularly on the justice and penal systems as Katerina and her abuser experience them.

=== Louisa May Alcott ===
In her novel Work: A Story of Experience, Louisa May Alcott introduces the character of Rachel as a friend to the heroine Christie, both of whom are working as seamstresses. When Rachel's past affair is revealed, she is fired, and only Christie defends her, calling her full of virtue, and even quitting because of the firing. Rachel saves Christie who was suicidal due to being unemployed and feeling incredibly lonely. Rachel also saves other women who were like her. Rachel and Christie part ways because Rachel says that she needs to do honest work. Later, Christie starts work for the Sterlings, helping the son David with his flower business and taking care of domestic chores the mother is unable to do. David and Christie seem to harbour feelings for each other, but David deeply misses a woman called Letty. After David meets Rachel, he confesses to Christie that Rachel is his long lost sister Letty whom he turned his back upon due to her 'disgracing her family' by running away with her lover. Letty is welcomed back as a sister, and Christie marries David. The friendship and love between Letty and Christie blossoms. At the end of the novel, Letty unites all the other women into a sisterhood.

== In film ==
In cinema, the fallen woman is one of the earliest representatives of the female prostitute, and the theme had great appeal during the silent era. By the mid 20th century, when women had access to a variety of jobs and their sexual activity was no longer necessarily associated with moral corruption, the fallen woman as a theme was no longer relevant. The films sometimes intended to convey a moral lesson; sometimes they were a social commentary on poverty; sometimes they explored the idea of redemption or the consequences of coercion; and sometimes they were about self-sacrifice. These contrasts, such as innocence and experience; sin and redemption; vice and virtue, as well as ideas about corruption, class, exploitation, suffering and punishment, build on themes in earlier literature. Some films, such as The Red Kimono (1925) in which the fallen woman was allowed to live happily at the end, were subject to severe censorship. The Road to Ruin (1928) was banned. Protect Us (1914) and The Primrose Path (1931) are films that emphasize the fault of the woman. The Jungle (1914) and Damaged Goods (1919) consider the element of coercion, whereas poverty is important in Out of the Night (1918), The Painted Lady (1924), and Die freudlose Gasse (Joyless Street, 1925).

== See also ==
- Women as theological figures
- Women in Christianity
- Magdalene asylum
- Genealogy of Jesus: Tamar, Rahab, and Bathsheba
