= Mark system (penology) =

Prison management system

A mark system is a penal system that allows prisoners to earn privileges and early release by accumulating "marks" through good behavior, achievement, and thrift. As devised by Alexander Maconochie, the goal of a mark system was to encourage reform by placing prisoners in control of their own destinies. The mark system sought to limit official discretion to the greatest extent possible and to make the release process transparent for prisoners. It was a determinate sentencing scheme in that the number of marks prisoners needed to earn, tabulated according to the seriousness of their offense, would be disclosed to them up front.

The mark system was implemented by Walter Crofton in Irish prisons and was also tried by Elmira Reformatory and other U.S. prisons. Prisoners were allowed to advance through grades as they earned marks. In 1940, the U.S. Department of Justice explained that the mark system failed because it depended on the quality of the prison leadership and staff and was too difficult for ordinary prison officers to implement:

The grading system also was too complicated for this type of staff to maintain, changing as it did with each new political administration. The tendency was to put every one who behaved himself into the first grade leaving only a few in the second grade and those actually under punishment in the third grade. The old "prison discipline" which placed the emphasis on being a "good prisoner" regardless of anything more fundamental, such as achievement in school or shop or character, was dominant still.

Charles Dickens was a friend of Maconochie's and admired the system, using it as the basis for the discipline of Urania Cottage, a women's hostel he founded in 1846 with philanthropist Angela Burdett-Coutts. In an 1846 letter to Burdett-Coutts proposing the foundation of the hostel, wrote:

It is explained to her that she is degraded and fallen, but not lost, having this shelter; and that the means of Return to Happiness are now about to be put into her own hands, and trusted to her own keeping. That with this view, she is, instead of being placed in this probationary class for a month, or two months, or three months, or any specified time whatever, required to earn there, a certain number of Marks (they are mere scratches in a book) so that she may make her probation a very short one, or a very long one, according to her own conduct. For so much work, she has so many Marks; for a day's good conduct, so many more. For every instance of ill-temper, disrespect, bad language, any outbreak of any sort or kind, so many - a very large number in proportion to her receipts - are deducted. A perfect Debtor and Creditor account is kept between her and the Superintendent, for every day; and the state of that account, it is in her own power and nobody else's, to adjust to her advantage.
