= Alexander Maconochie =

Alexander Maconochie may refer to:

- Alexander Maconochie, Lord Meadowbank (1777–1861)
- Alexander Maconochie (penal reformer) (1787–1860)
- Alexander Maconochie Centre, the jail in the Australian Capital Territory

== See also ==
- Alexander Mackonochie
