= Lectionary 225 =

Lectionary ℓ 225
- New Testament manuscript
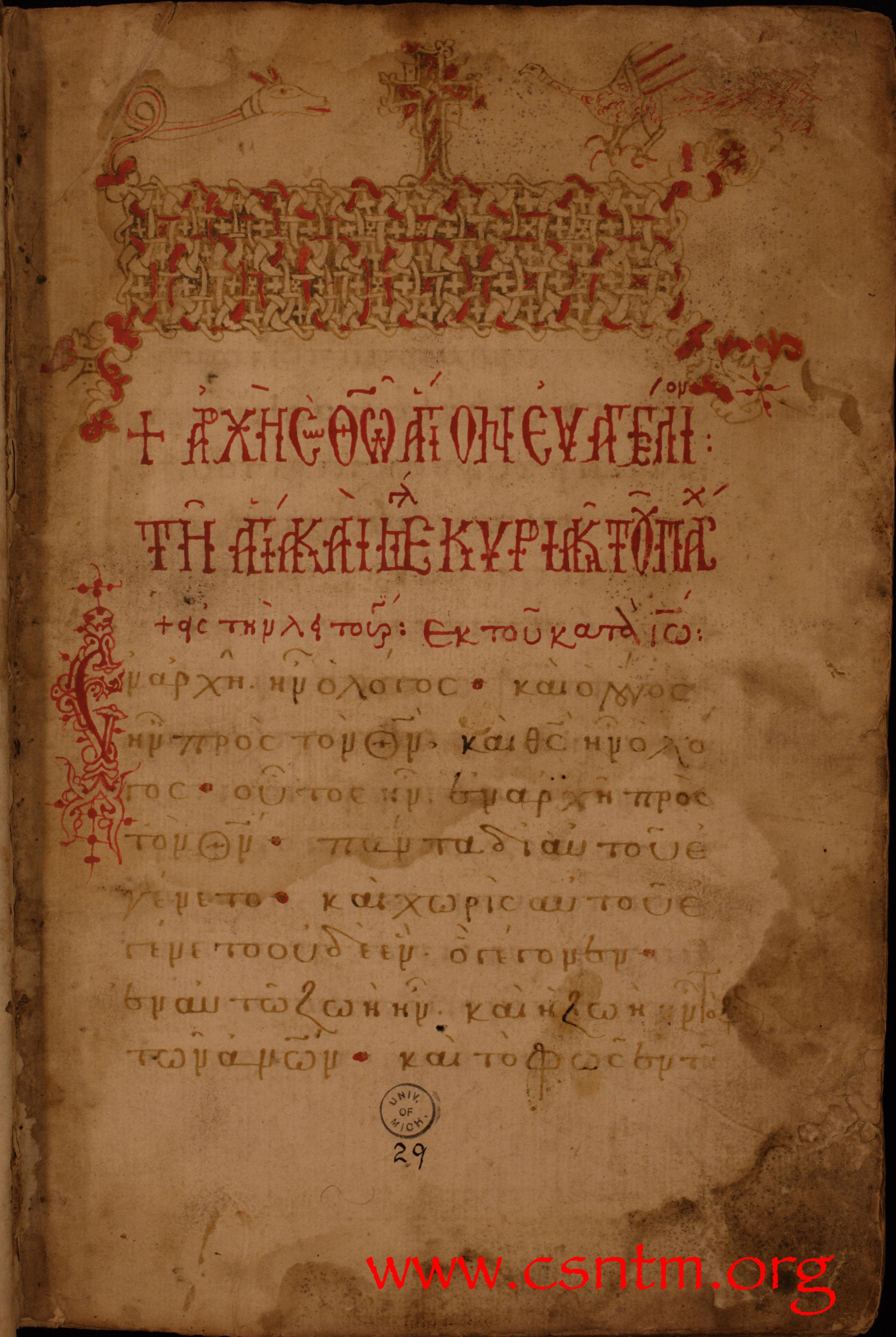
- Folio 1 recto
- Name: P. Michigan 29
- Text: Evangelistarium
- Date: 15th century
- Script: Greek
- Now at: University of Michigan
- Size: 29 cm by 20.3 cm
- Hand: neatly written

Lectionary 225, designated by siglum ℓ 225 (in the Gregory-Aland numbering) is a Greek manuscript of the New Testament, on paper. Palaeographically it has been assigned to the 15th century. Scrivener labelled it by 248^{evl}. The manuscript has complex contents.

== Description ==
The codex contains lessons from the Gospels of John, Matthew, Luke lectionary (Evangelistarium), on 309 paper leaves (29 cm by 20.3 cm). The text is written in Greek minuscule letters, in one column per page, 17 lines per page. According to Scrivener the manuscript is neat and complete.

There are daily lessons from Easter to Pentecost.

Textual variants

The word before the bracket is the reading of the UBS edition, the word after the bracket is the reading of the manuscript. The reading of Textus Receptus in bold.

John 1:7 – πιστευσωσιν ] πιστευσωσι
John 1:15 – κεκραγεν ] κεκραγε
John 1:16 – οτι ] και
John 1:18 – εωρακεν ] εωρακε
John 1:18 – μονογενης θεος ] ο μονογενης υιος
John 1:20 – εγω ουκ ειμι ] ουκ ειμι εγω
John 1:21 – και λεγει ] λεγει
John 1:27 – omit ] ος εμπροσθεν μου γεγονεν
John 1:28 – βηθανια ] βηθανια (TR reads βηθαβαρα)

== History ==
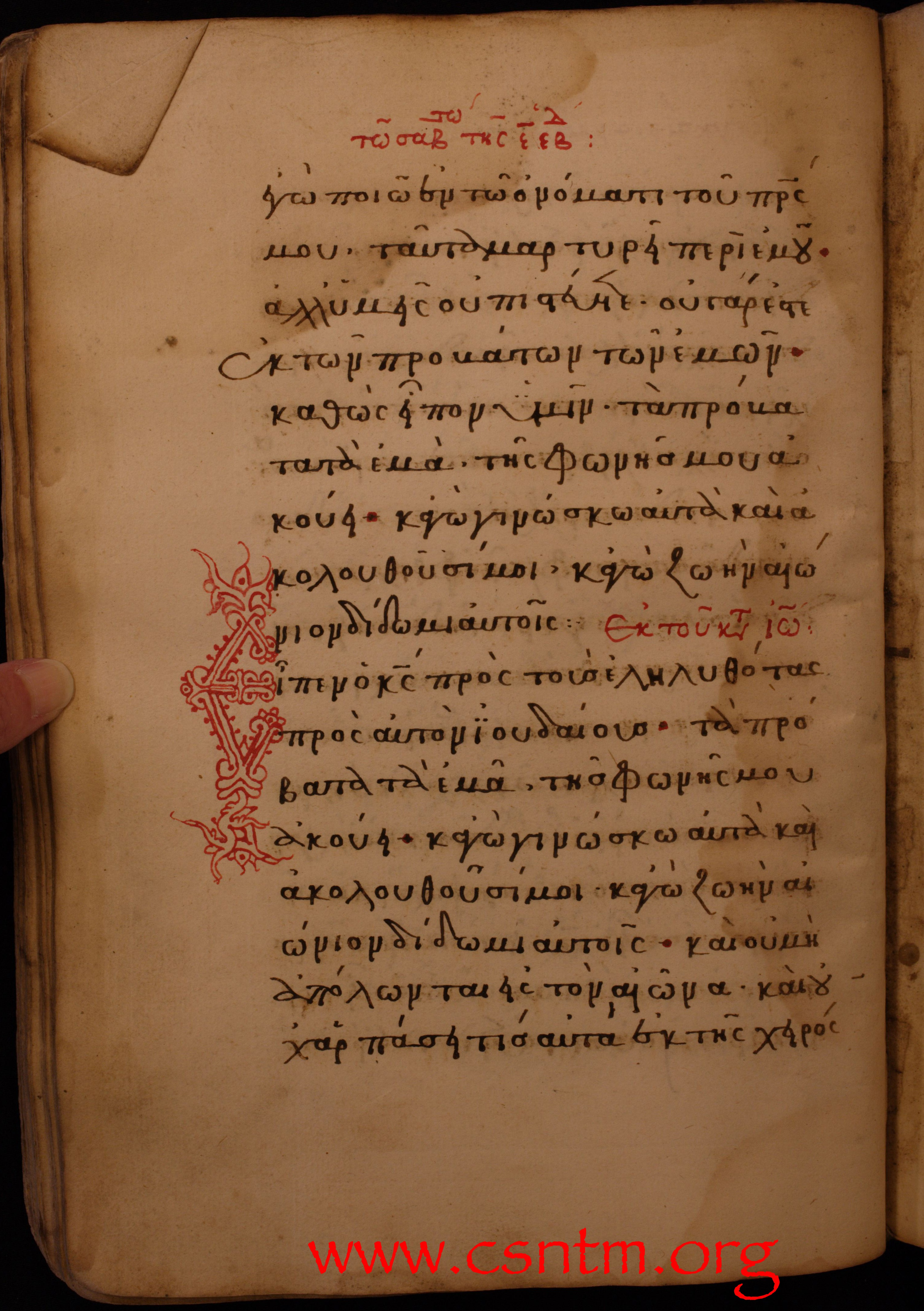
Folio 43 verso

It has been assigned by the Institute for New Testament Textual Research (INTF) to the 15th century. According to the colophon the manuscript was written in 1437, April 28, by Presbyter George.

Of the history of the codex nothing is known until 1864, when it was in the possession of a dealer at Janina in Epeiros. It was then purchased from him by a representative of Baroness Burdett-Coutts (1814–1906), a philanthropist, along with other Greek manuscripts. They were transported to England in 1870-1871. The manuscript was presented by Burdett-Coutts to Sir Roger Cholmely's School, and was housed at the Highgate (Burdett-Coutts III. 43), in London.

The manuscript was added to the list of New Testament manuscripts by Scrivener (number 248) and Gregory (number 225). Gregory saw it in 1883. In 1922 it was acquired for the University of Michigan.

The manuscript is sporadically cited in the critical editions of the Greek New Testament (UBS3).

The codex is housed at the University of Michigan (Ms. 29) in Ann Arbor.

== See also ==
- List of New Testament lectionaries
- Biblical manuscript
- Textual criticism

== Bibliography ==
- Kenneth W. Clark, A Descriptive Catalogue of Greek New Testament Manuscripts in America (Chicago, 1937), pp. 304-305.
