= Lectionary 219 =

Lectionary ℓ 219
- New Testament manuscript
- Text: Evangelistarium †
- Date: 11th century
- Script: Greek
- Now at: ?
- Size: 27 cm by 21.5 cm

Lectionary 219, designated by siglum ℓ 219 (in the Gregory-Aland numbering) is a Greek manuscript of the New Testament, on parchment. Palaeographically it has been assigned to the 11th century. Frederick Henry Ambrose Scrivener labelled it by 243^{evl}.

== Description ==
The codex contains lessons from the Gospels of John, Matthew, Luke lectionary (Evangelistarium), on 319 parchment leaves (27 cm by 21.5 cm), with only one lacuna (the first leaf with John 1:1-17 and nine leaves at the end). Nine leaves at the end were supplemented by a later hand.

The text is written in Greek minuscule letters, in two columns per page, 22 lines per page. The headings in gold. According to Scrivener it is "a fine copy". It contains musical notes.

There are weekday Gospel lessons.

== History ==
Scrivener dated the manuscript to the 11th or 12th century, Gregory dated it to the 12th century. It has been assigned by the Institute for New Testament Textual Research to the 11th century.

Of the history of the codex nothing is known until the year 1864, when it was in the possession of a dealer at Janina in Epeiros. It was then purchased from him by a representative of Baroness Burdett-Coutts (1814–1906), a philanthropist, along with other Greek manuscripts. They were transported to England in 1870-1871. The manuscript was presented by Burdett-Coutts to Sir Roger Cholmely's School, and was housed at the Highgate (Burdett-Coutts II. 5), in London.

The manuscript was added to the list of New Testament manuscripts by Scrivener (number 243) and Gregory (number 218). Gregory saw it in 1883.

The manuscript is sporadically cited in the critical editions of the Greek New Testament (UBS3).

The owner of the codex is unknown. The last place of its housing was Sotheby's.

== See also ==
- List of New Testament lectionaries
- Biblical manuscript
- Textual criticism

== Bibliography ==
- Gregory, Caspar René (1900). Textkritik des Neuen Testaments. Vol. 1. Leipzig. p. 405.
