= Lectionary 224 =

Lectionary ℓ 224
- New Testament manuscript
- Text: Evangelistarium
- Date: 14th century
- Script: Greek
- Now at: University of Michigan
- Size: 26 cm by 20.3 cm
- Hand: neat

Lectionary 224, designated by siglum ℓ 224 (in the Gregory-Aland numbering) is a Greek manuscript of the New Testament, scribed on parchment. Palaeographically it has been assigned to the 14th century. Frederick Henry Ambrose Scrivener labelled it by 247^{evl}.

== Contents ==
The codex contains lessons from the Gospels of John, Matthew, Luke lectionary (Evangelistarium). It fills 206 parchment leaves (26 cm by 20.3 cm). The text is written in Greek minuscule letters, in one column of 21 lines per page.

Daily lessons span Easter to Pentecost.

== History ==
Frederick Henry Ambrose Scrivener dated the manuscript to the 14th or 15th century, Gregory to the 14th century. It has been assigned by the INTF to the 14th century.

Nothing is known of its history until 1864, when it came into the possession of a dealer at Janina in Epeiros. It was then purchased by a representative of Baroness Burdett-Coutts (1814–1906), a philanthropist, along with other Greek manuscripts. They were transported to England in 1870–1871. The manuscript was presented by Burdett-Coutts to Sir Roger Cholmely's School, and was housed at the Highgate (Burdett-Coutts III. 34), in London.

The manuscript was added to the list of New Testament manuscripts by Scrivener (number 247) and Gregory (number 224). Gregory saw it in 1883. In 1922 it was acquired for the University of Michigan.

The manuscript is not cited in the critical editions of the Greek New Testament (UBS3).

The codex is housed at the University of Michigan (Ms. 31) in Ann Arbor.

== See also ==
- List of New Testament lectionaries
- Biblical manuscript
- Textual criticism

== Bibliography ==
- Kenneth W. Clark, A Descriptive Catalogue of Greek New Testament Manuscripts in America (Chicago, 1937), pp. 308–309.
