= Lectionary 220 =

Lectionary ℓ 220
- New Testament manuscript
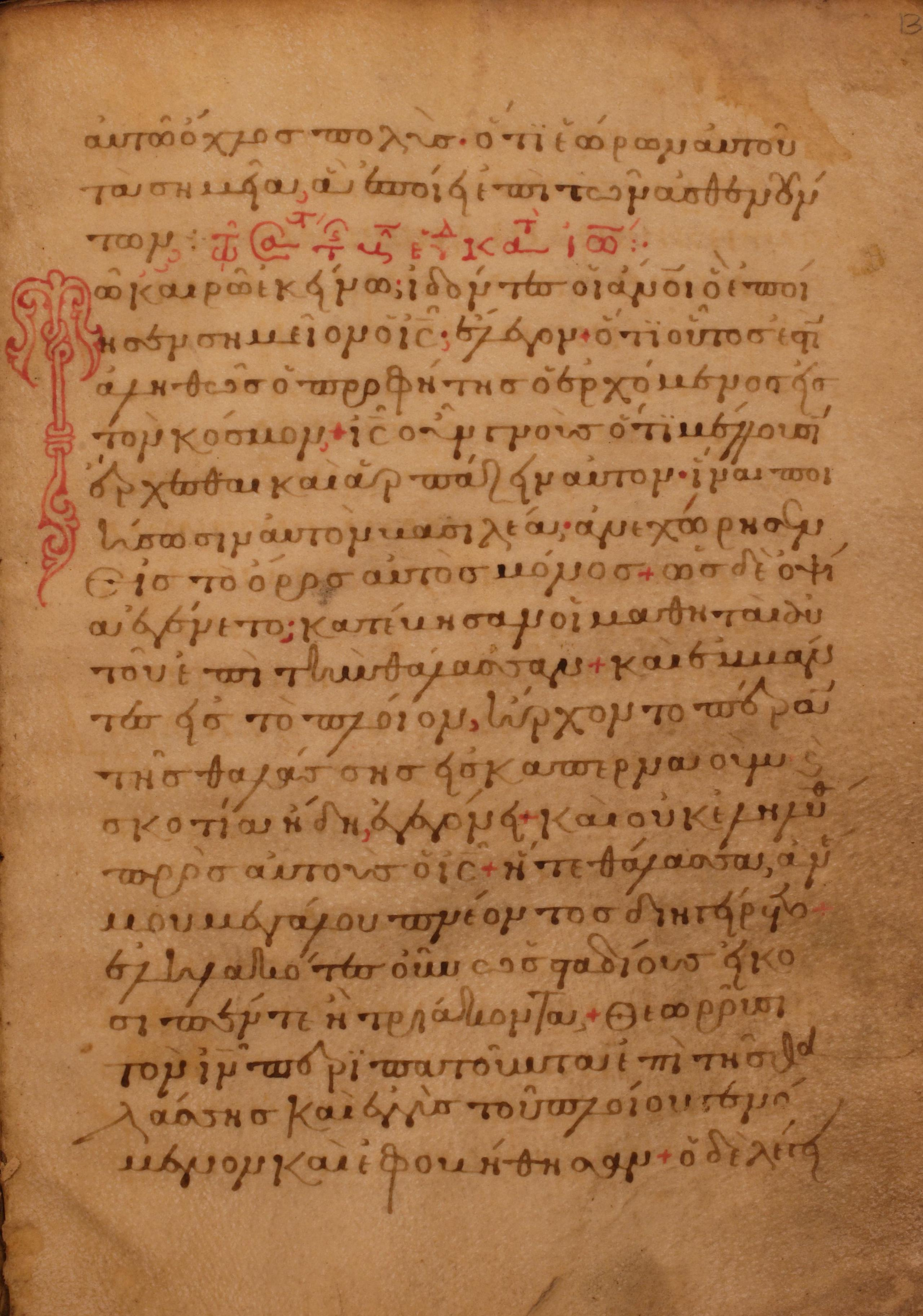
- A page of a manuscript, with a decorative drawing in the left margin
- Text: Evangelistarium †
- Date: 13th century
- Script: Greek
- Now at: University of Michigan
- Size: 20.8 cm by 15.8 cm

Lectionary 220, designated by siglum ℓ 220 (in the Gregory-Aland numbering) is a Greek manuscript of the New Testament, on parchment. Palaeographically it has been assigned to the 13th century. Frederick Henry Ambrose Scrivener labelled it by 244^{evl}. The manuscript is lacunose.

== Description ==
The codex contains lessons from the Gospels of John, Matthew, Luke lectionary (Evangelistarium), on 161 parchment leaves (20.8 cm by 15.8 cm), with only one but large lacuna at the end (ends in Luke 2,59). The text is written in Greek minuscule letters, in one column per page, 22 lines per page. The leaf 103 is only 11 cm wide, the leaf 132 is 12.5 cm wide; they were cut off.

It is a palimpsest, the older text is from the 10th century, it was written in one column and 21 lines per page, it contains lessons lectionary, and it was catalogued as Lectionary 2309 on the list Gregory-Aland.

There are daily lessons from Easter to Pentecost.

== History ==
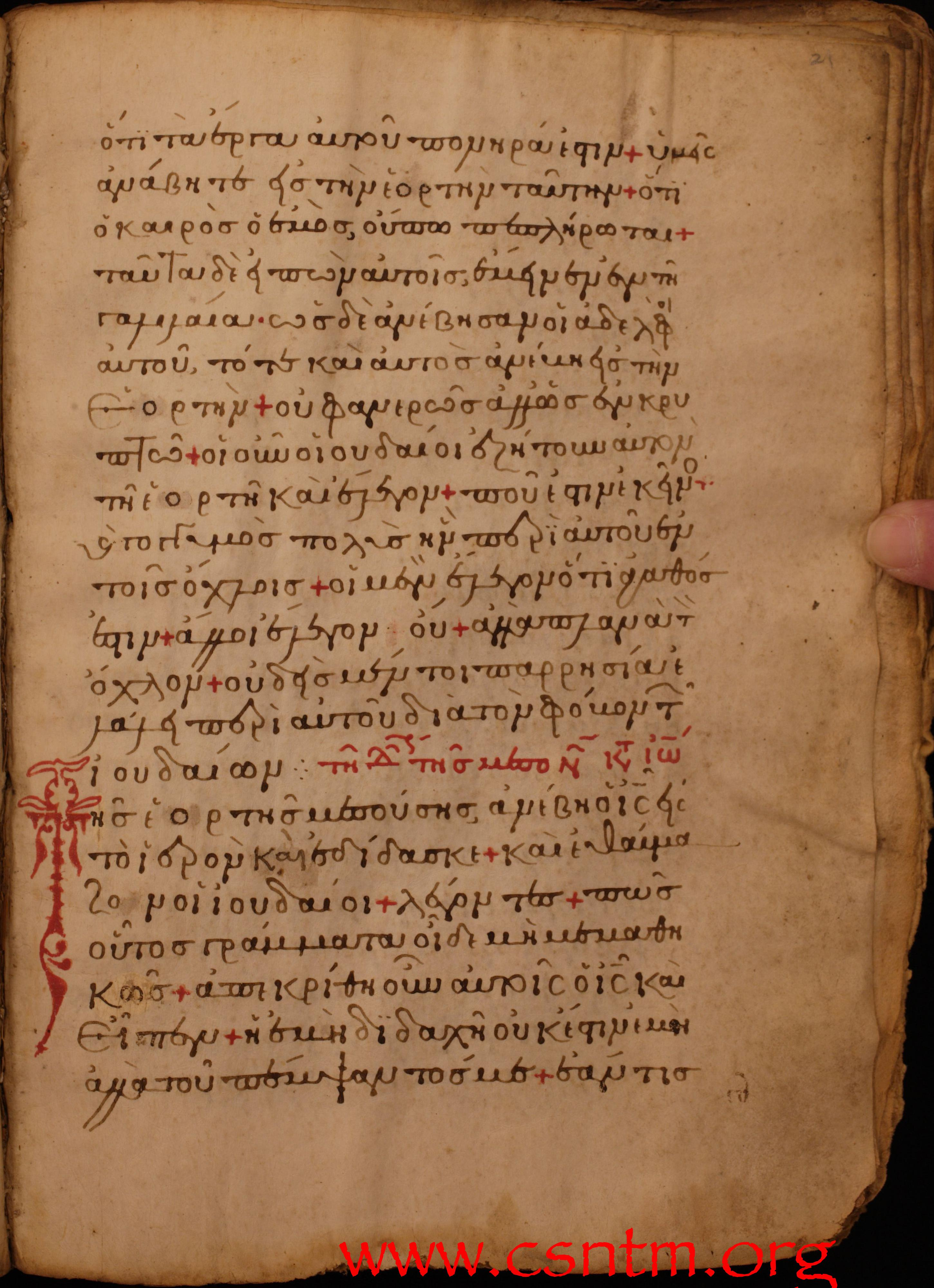
Folio 21 recto

Scrivener and Gregory dated the manuscript to the 13th century. It has been assigned by the INTF to the 13th century. The name of the scribe is unknown.

Of the history of the codex nothing is known until 1864, when it was in the possession of a dealer at Janina in Epirus. It was then purchased from him by a representative of Baroness Burdett-Coutts (1814–1906), a philanthropist, along with more than one hundred other Greek manuscripts. They were transported to England in 1870–1871. The manuscript was presented by Burdett-Coutts to Sir Roger Cholmely's School, and was housed at the Highgate (Burdett-Coutts II. 16), in London, where was housed to the year 1922. In 1922 it was acquired for the University of Michigan. The manuscript was examined and described by K. W. Clark.

The manuscript was added to the list of New Testament manuscripts by Scrivener (number 244) and Gregory (number 220). Gregory saw it in 1883.

The manuscript is not cited in the critical editions of the Greek New Testament (UBS3).

The codex is housed at the University of Michigan (Ms. 83) in Ann Arbor.

== See also ==
- List of New Testament lectionaries
- Biblical manuscript
- Textual criticism

== Bibliography ==
- Kenneth W. Clark, A Descriptive Catalogue of Greek New Testament Manuscripts in America (Chicago, 1937), pp. 321–322.
