= Symonston Correctional Centre =

Prison in the Australian Capital Territory

Coordinates: 35°20′48″S 149°8′15″E

Australian Prisons
Periodic Detention Centre (Symonston)
Location:	Symonston, Australian Capital Territory
Status:	Non-operational
Classification:	Minimum Security
Capacity:	22
Opened:	1962
Closed:	2017
Managed by:	ACT Corrective Services

Symonston Correctional Centre is a former minimum security Australian prison located in Symonston, Australian Capital Territory, Australia. Its recent capacity was 22 when in use. It was formerly the Quamby Children's Remand Centre, and later the Symonston Periodic Detention Centre, with part of the site redeveloped in 2014 as the Dhulwa Secure Mental Health Unit.

As of October 2022, The Symonston Correctional Centre remained designated as a correctional institution within ACT but was deemed unsuitable for continued operation in its intended capacity. According to the ACT Government, significant renovations would be necessary to upgrade its infrastructure to meet the requisite standards for security and safety for a permanent correctional facility. The Symonston Correctional Centre is occasionally used by the ACT Corrective Services and various other agencies for training activities.

== Quamby ==
The Quamby Youth Detention Centre originally opened in 1962 and was used as a shelter for young people who had nowhere to reside, or for young people who were placed on short term remand. Those who received a committal term from the courts were housed at New South Wales training centres.

Quamby, a medium to low security facility, can accommodate up to 26 children and young people who have been refused bail or sentenced to a period of detention. The Children’s Court may pass a sentence of up to two years. However, a longer sentence may be handed down if the child or young person is sentenced through the Supreme Court.

The age of criminal responsibility in the ACT is 10 years. Quamby can house both male and females from the age of 10. As a person who committed their offence whilst under 18 may be sentenced as a young person up to the age of 18 and 6 months, it is possible for Quamby to house a detainee over the age of 18 for the duration of their Court Order.

Quamby operates within the legislative requirements of the Children and Young People Act 1999, and is operated by the Office of Children, Youth and Family Services in the ACT Department of Disability, Housing and Community Services.

=== New premises for youth detention ===
In early 2006, the Government of the Australian Capital Territory announced plans for a $40 million youth detention centre at Mitchell, ACT. Thirty hectares of pastoral land on Wells Station Road, just off the Federal Highway, were earmarked for a new centre to replace the existing Quamby centre. The new juvenile detention centre opened in June 2008 as Bimberi Youth Justice Centre, and is capable of housing up to 50 residents.

In 2007 Symonston was criticised by the Human Rights Commission for allowing little time out of cells and for excessive lockdowns.

== Symonston Periodic Detention Centre ==
Between 2007 and 2017, the site was converted from a juvenile detention centre to an adult period detention centre, that was primarily used for weekend detention. In 2015 it was used as a temporary solution to the overcrowding in the ACT's main adult prison, the Alexander Maconochie Centre.

== Dhulwa Secure Mental Health Unit ==
In 2014, the ACT Government announced that a new 25-bed secure mental health unit would be developed on part of the former Quamby centre site. The facility opened in 2016, named "Dhulwa" - a Ngunnawal word for a flowering banksia.

Dhulwa is operated by Canberra Health Services to focus on rehabilitation and is not a custodial facility. Despite this, in 2022, an independent report was delivered to government responding to serious incidents of violence towards staff. This raised concerns that the facility's model of care was not appropriate for its purpose. Dhulwa accepts voluntary admissions as well as patients subject to court orders. However, policies placed the same restrictions on all patients, with security staff frequently using force to restrain and isolate patients, and cancellation of leave as a punitive measure.

== See also ==
- List of Australian prisons
