= Lectionary 222 =

Lectionary ℓ 222
- New Testament manuscript
- Text: Evangelistarium
- Date: 13th century
- Script: Greek
- Now at: Orlando, Florida
- Size: 31.5 cm by 22 cm

Lectionary 222, designated by siglum ℓ 222 (in the Gregory-Aland numbering) is a Greek manuscript of the New Testament, on parchment. Palaeographically it has been assigned to the 13th century. Scrivener labelled it by 246^{evl}.

== Description ==
The codex contains lessons from the Gospels of lectionary (Evangelistarium), on 235 parchment leaves (31.5 cm by 22 cm), with a large lacuna (ends in Mark 6:22).

The text is written in Greek minuscule letters, in two columns per page, 25 lines per page. It contains pictures and illuminations.

== History ==
Scrivener dated the manuscript to the 13th century.

Of the history of the codex nothing is known until the year 1864, when it was in the possession of a dealer at Janina in Epeiros. It was then purchased from him by a representative of Baroness Burdett-Coutts (1814–1906), a philanthropist, along with other Greek manuscripts. They were transported to England in 1870-1871. The manuscript was presented by Burdett-Coutts to Sir Roger Cholmely's School, and was housed at the Highgate (Burdett-Coutts III. 21), in London. Gregory did not find the manuscript in 1883. The present place of its housing is unknown.

The manuscript is not cited in the critical editions of the Greek New Testament (UBS3).

The manuscript was added to the list of New Testament manuscripts by Scrivener (number 246) and Gregory (number 222).

== See also ==
- List of New Testament lectionaries
- Biblical manuscript
- Textual criticism

== Bibliography ==
- Gregory, Caspar René (1900). Textkritik des Neuen Testaments. Vol. 1. Leipzig. p. 405.
