= Lectionary 218 =

Lectionary ℓ 218
- New Testament manuscript
- Text: Evangelistarium †
- Date: 15th century
- Script: Greek
- Now at: ?
- Size: 32 cm by 25.7 cm

Lectionary 218, designated by siglum ℓ 218 (in the Gregory-Aland numbering) is a Greek manuscript of the New Testament, on paper. Palaeographically it has been assigned to the 15th century. Scrivener labelled it by 242^{evl}.

== Description ==
The codex contains lessons from the Gospels of John, Matthew, Luke lectionary (Evangelistarium), on 288 paper leaves (32 cm by 25.7 cm), with only one lacuna (the last leaf). The text is written in Greek minuscule letters, in two columns per page, 18 lines per page. The manuscript has complex contents, but the first leaf was supplied by a later hand.

There are daily lessons from Easter to Pentecost.

== History ==
The manuscript was written for the church in Constantinople.

Scrivener dated the manuscript to the 14th century, Gregory dated it to the 13th century. It has been assigned by the Institute for New Testament Textual Research to the 15th century.

Of the history of the codex nothing is known until 864, when it was in the possession of a dealer at Janina in Epeiros. It was then purchased from him by a representative of Baroness Burdett-Coutts (1814–1906), a philanthropist, along with other Greek manuscripts. They were transported to England in 1870-1871. The manuscript was presented by Burdett-Coutts to Sir Roger Cholmely's School, and was housed at the Highgate (Burdett-Coutts I. 23.2), in London.

The manuscript was added to the list of New Testament manuscripts by Scrivener (number 242) and Gregory (number 218). Gregory saw it in 1883.

The manuscript is not cited in the critical editions of the Greek New Testament (UBS3).

The owner of the codex is unknown. The last place of its housing was Sotheby's.

== See also ==
- List of New Testament lectionaries
- Biblical manuscript
- Textual criticism

== Bibliography ==
- Gregory, Caspar René (1900). Textkritik des Neuen Testaments. Vol. 1. Leipzig. p. 405.
