= Stacey Halls =

British writer

- Born: Stacey Nicole Bartlett; August 1989 (age 37)
- Education: University of Central Lancashire
- Years active: 2019–present
- Spouse: Andy Halls
- Children: 1
- Website: www.staceyhalls.com

Stacey Nicole Halls (née Bartlett; born August 1989) is an English author of gothic historical fiction. Her debut novel The Familiars (2019) became a Sunday Times bestseller and earned a Betty Trask Award. This was followed by further bestsellers The Foundling (2020), Mrs England (2021) and The Household (2024). Halls won the 2022 Women's Prize x Good Housekeeping Futures Award.

== Early life ==
Halls grew up in Rawtenstall in the valley of Rossendale, the daughter of market traders Eileen and Stuart Bartlett. She attended Bacup and Rawtenstall Grammar School. After completing her A Levels in 2007, Halls went directly into work as a legal secretary for sixth months before deciding to go to university, the first in her family to do so. She went on to graduate from the University of Central Lancashire with a degree in journalism. Halls was named Most Promising Student Journalist of the Year (Undergraduate) at the 2012 PTC New Talent Awards.

== Career ==
After graduating, Halls had jobs at The Bookseller and as a sub-editor for Fabulous, which she obtained through university work placements and staying with her cousin in Surrey. In her magazine jobs, she noted being one of the only employees with a northern accent and not from a monied background. Her first attempt at fiction writing, a contemporary novel, was unsuccessful. She took time off in early 2017 to make pher second attempt.

Previously known by her maiden name Stacey Bartlett, in November 2017, Zaffre (a Bonnier Books imprint) won a nine-way auction to publish Halls' official debut novel The Familiars in February 2019. The novel is based on the Pendle witch trials. Debuting at #2 with 11 weeks on The Sunday Times bestseller list, making it the bestselling debut hardback novel of 2019, The Familiars made the Richard & Judy Book Club list, received a 2020 Betty Trask Award, and was shortlisted for Debut Book of the Year at the British Book Awards.

Initially set to reunite with Zaffre for her Georgian London-set sophomore novel, The Foundling became the inaugural publication of Manilla Press, a new Bonnier Books imprint launched in February 2020. A #5 Sunday Times bestseller, the novel was released under the title The Lost Orphan in the U.S. and Canada.

Shortly after reaching 500,000 sales between her first two novels, Halls' third, Mrs England, was published in 2021 and opened at #4 on The Sunday Times bestseller list. The novel follows an Edwardian children's nurse who moves from London to West Yorkshire, and combines elements from gothic novels such as Rebecca and Jane Eyre with elements from children's stories such as Mary Poppins and The Railway Children. Mrs England was longlisted for the 2021 Portico Prize and the 2022 Walter Scott Prize.

Halls won the inaugural 2022 Women's Prize for Fiction x Good Housekeeping Futures Award.

The Stacey Halls bursary, which gives aspiring working class northern writers access to Arvon Foundation writing courses, was established in 2023.

In 2024 Halls reunited with Manilla Press for her fourth novel,The Household, based on the true story of Charles Dickens and Angela Burdett-Coutts' Urania Cottage for homeless women.

== Adaptations ==
In March 2019, production company The Bureau optioned the rights to adapt The Familiars for television.

== Personal life ==
Halls is married to journalist Andy Halls. They lived in London and Hebden Bridge, Yorkshire before moving to Oxfordshire. She has a son.

== Bibliography ==
=== Novels ===
- The Familiars (2019)
- The Foundling (2020) (The Lost Orphan in some territories)
- Mrs England (2021)
- The Household (2024)
- The Sitting Tenant (2027)

=== Short stories ===
- "Bridge Street" in The Witching Hour: Ghostly Tales for the Darkest Nights (2025)
