= Witness J =

Australian intelligence officer

- Other names: Alan Johns, Prisoner 123458
- Education: Royal Military College, Duntroon
- Occupations: Army Officer, Intelligence Officer
- Known for: Tried and imprisoned in secret
- Criminal charge: Using an insecure channel to communicate classified information
- Criminal penalty: 2 years and 7 months imprisonment
- Criminal status: Released

Witness J, referred to in court documents by the placeholder name Alan Johns and in custody as Prisoner 123458, is a former Australian intelligence officer who was secretly tried and imprisoned in 2019 for communicating sensitive information over an insecure channel. Limited information about his identity and conviction has been made public.

== Life and career ==
Witness J is a graduate of The Royal Military College, Duntroon and served with distinction in East Timor, Afghanistan and Iraq. He was awarded an Operational Service Medal for serving alongside special forces in Afghanistan as part of Operation Okra.

Witness J's subsequent employment has never been officially identified, a summary of offending released on 8 June 2021 stated that he was a former Commonwealth official who held a high level security clearance. Some reporting, and a Twitter account identified as belonging to Witness J, has stated that he worked for the Department of Foreign Affairs and Trade (DFAT) or as an intelligence officer in the Australian Secret Intelligence Service (ASIS).

In 2017, Witness J was working for an Australian commonwealth intelligence agency at an Australian embassy "in a South-East Asian capital" when concerns were raised about his behaviour, including a trip to Singapore without written approval. Due to concerns about both Witness J's behaviour and failure to meet reporting obligations his security clearance was subject to a revalidation process which included opportunities for Witness J to respond to concerns. These concerns were not addressed, and as a result Witness J's security clearance and job were terminated.

Witness J complained to the agency he worked for that he had been unfairly treated over an unsecured email system. This correspondence contained, and the Government argues could have revealed, classified information which could endanger the lives or safety of others.

== Trial and imprisonment ==
Witness J was remanded in custody by ACT Chief Magistrate Lorraine Walker in mid-May 2018, and by agreement of parties to the proceedings on November 19 2018 orders were made under Section 22 of the National Security Information (Criminal and Civil Proceedings) Act 2004 (NSI Act) to close the trial to the public.

Witness J plead guilty and on 19 February 2019 was sentenced to two years and seven month in prison for using an insecure channel to communicate classified information. He was held for 15 months in the sexual offender wing of Canberra's Alexander Maconochie Centre despite not being a sexual offender. He was released from custody in August 2019, subject to regular psychological testing and an overseas travel ban.

In sentencing remarks, sentencing Judge John Burns maintained that Witness J was aware of the gravity of his actions and chose to act in a "grossly reckless" way. Burns found Witness J was motivated by anger at perceived unfair treatment alongside a lack of confidence in the process available to challenge that treatment, and his judgement was impaired at the time by mental health issues.

== Public reports ==
The first public report on Witness J's imprisonment was a 13 November 2019 article by Robert Macklin. Witness J had contacted Macklin for help publishing a memoir about his time in Alexander Maconochie Centre, which Witness J claimed was exclusively about his time in prison and did not contain sensitive information. In February 2019, soon after Witness J first contacted Macklin, the Australian Federal Police Witness J's cell, his brother's home and restricted email access. Witness J took unsuccessful civil action in the Supreme Court of the Australian Capital Territory, claiming that his human rights had been violated. A judgement delivered regarding this case on 8 November 2019 is what Macklin first reported on.

In early 2023 a media outlet applied for the sentencing remarks made by the judge in November 2019 to be released. Some details of Witness J's case will remain secret for up to 20 years, despite the release of a redacted version of the remarks.

== Impact of case ==
The case sparked debate in the media about the unprecedented secrecy of the proceedings and its violation of the open justice principle underpinning Australia's legal system. The secrecy of the trial was widely condemned, with New South Wales Supreme Court Justice Anthony Whealy questioning whether Australia is becoming a totalitarian state. The use of a wholly closed criminal trial in the matter was described as "unprecedented" by the Independent National Security Legislation Monitor, with the possible exception of trials during World War I or World War II.

The Australian Capital Territory's Justice Minister Shane Rattenbury was unaware of the secret prisoner until learning about him through the media even though Prisoner J had been held in the Territory's Alexander Maconochie Centre over which Rattenbury had ministerial oversight. ACT Chief Justice Lucy McCallum said that open justice is important and the wholly secret trial should not have happened (describing it as "anathema to the rule of law", but that sometimes some information must be secret for national security.

The memoir regarding Witness J's experience while incarcerated was published in 2020 as Here, There are Dragons. Profits of the book go to a mental health charity due to proceeds of crime laws. The book discusses Witness J's experience being held in the sexual offender wing, alongside high-profile criminals.

On 9 June 2021 a public hearing into how Part 3, Division 1 of the NSI Act was used to secretly convict Witness J was held by the Independent National Security Legislation Monitor (INSLM), Grant Donaldson SC. Lawyers from the Human Rights Law Centre and Law Council of Australia argued that secret trials were inappropriate and open justice was lacking in the case of Witness J. Witnesses from government bodies including the Australian Security Intelligence Organisation, Office of National Intelligence, and Attorney-General's Department, told the hearing that secrecy was sometimes essential to protect national security. The INSLM report was completed on 17 June 2022, and made four sets of recommendations which "emerge[d] from shortcomings in the section 22 process".

In July 2022 Attorney-General Mark Dreyfus directed the INSLM to review the whole of the NSI Act, including the provisions under which details of Witness J's case were made secret. Public hearings were held on 19 and 20 July 2023, and the report, which made 40 recommendations, was completed on 30 October 2023.

== See also ==
- Bernard Collaery - Australian lawyer charged under the National Security Information (NSI) Act
- David McBride - Australian whistleblower
