= Secret trial =

Conflict resolution in a tribunal closed to the people

A secret trial is a trial that is not open to the public or generally reported in the news, especially any in-trial proceedings. Generally, no official record of the case or the judge's verdict is made available. Often there is no indictment. Secret trials have been characteristic of many dictatorships in the modern era, but are also used in many democratic nations, with the explanation of being necessary for national security. They are a hotly debated topic in many circles, but are generally accepted in the Western world as they are seen as protecting the "greater good".

The degree of secrecy and due process may vary. Court-martials often have closed courtrooms, as they may cover secret military matters, but such trials are not secret trials in the traditional sense; this list does not include secret court martials unless exceptional.

== Australia ==
It is possible that some wholly-secret trials occurred in Australia during World War I or World War II. In the 21st century, several secret trials have occurred or are set to occur in Australia:

- In 2018, "Witness J" was tried and imprisoned by the Australian government in near-total secrecy. The existence of Witness J was discovered only by chance by a judge, and the scant details were reported to the media. The Attorney General of the Australian Capital Territory, where Witness J was imprisoned, was not aware of the case. Witness J is a former employee of one of Australia's intelligence agencies, but the identity and alleged crimes are still not public. Independent National Security Legislation Monitor James Renwick said that the level of secrecy in Witness J's case was "unprecedented".
- From 2018 to 2021, the lawyer Bernard Collaery and "Witness K" were prosecuted by the Australian government with a high degree of secrecy, and part of their upcoming trial will be held in secret. The Liberal-National Coalition government of John Howard had helped secure the independence of impoverished Timor Leste from Indonesia. Negotiations were underway over fossil fuel deposits located in the sea between Timor Leste and Australia. The Howard government spied on the new Timor Leste government, and used that as leverage in negotiations to aid Australian company Woodside Petroleum. Collaery and Witness K are accused of sharing this with the Australian media and the Timor Leste government. Collaery was Witness K's lawyer at the time. Witness K has pleaded guilty, while Collaery has not. Indictments against Collaery were dropped on 7 July 2022 by new Attorney-General Mark Dreyfus SC.
- From 2018 to 2021, the former military lawyer David McBride was prosecuted by the Australian government for leaking details of alleged war crimes committed by Australian soldiers in Afghanistan. McBride reported the crimes to superiors in the Australian Defence Force but felt that the evidence was not being taken seriously. He went to the Australian Broadcasting Corporation, which in 2017 published a series of articles on the killings and corpse-mutilations called "The Afghan Files". Then, the military began to investigate the war crimes, which led to the 2020 Brereton Report. Part of McBride's upcoming trial will be held in secret. On 14 May 2024, McBride was sentenced to 5 years and 8 months in prison, with a non-parole period of 2 years and 3 months.

== Soviet Union ==
Although the Great Purges in the Soviet Union under Joseph Stalin are best remembered for the Moscow Trials, show trials in which the court became a parody of justice, most of the victims of the Terror were tried in secret. Mikhail Tukhachevsky and his fellow Red Army officers were tried in secret by a military tribunal, and their executions were announced only after the fact. The presiding judge of the Moscow Trials, Vasili Ulrikh, also presided over large numbers of secret trials, lasting only a few minutes, in which he would quickly speak his way through a pre-formulated charge and verdict.

== United Kingdom ==
In the United Kingdom, one of the most notorious secret courts was the Star Chamber under King Charles I of England in the early 17th century. The abuses of the Star Chamber were one of the rallying points of the opposition that organized around Oliver Cromwell and ultimately resulted in the execution of the deposed king. The term "star chamber" became a generalized term for a court that was accountable to no one (except the chief executive) and was used to suppress political dissent or eliminate the enemies of the regime.

R v Incedal and Rarmoul-Bouhadjar (2014) was to be the first British terrorism trial to be held entirely in secret. However, the Court of Appeal blocked full secrecy.

== United States ==
The FISA Courts of the national intelligence apparatus are by design secret courts and are empowered by the Foreign Intelligence Surveillance Act of 1978 to conduct secret trials and to impose secret punishments. Counsel arguing in the court are also subject to a secrecy order against disclosure of information about any cases in front of the court. Individuals who have been targeted in the court are also subjected to secrecy orders. The court sits ex parte, in the absence of anyone but the judge and the government present at the hearings. That, combined with the minimal number of requests that are rejected by the court, has led experts to characterize it as a rubber stamp; the former National Security Agency analyst Russ Tice called it a "kangaroo court with a rubber stamp".

== See also ==
- In camera
- Open court principle
- Secret witness
