= Belconnen Remand Centre =

Prison in the Australian Capital Territory

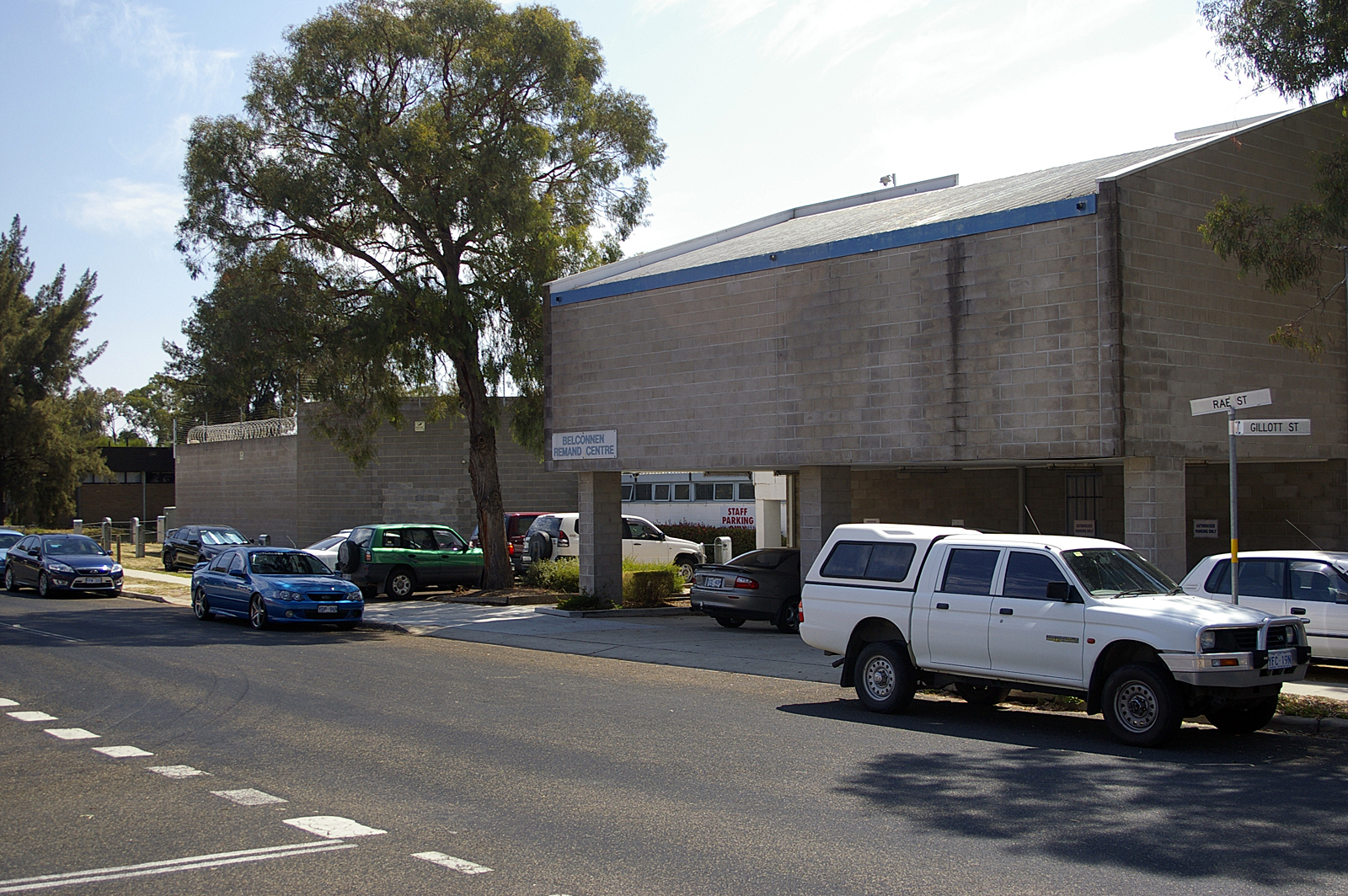
- Exterior of Belconnen Remand Centre in February 2009

- Location in Australian Capital Territory
- Location: Belconnen, Australian Capital Territory; 35.2386°S 149.0626°E
- Status: Closed
- Security class: Minimum to maximum / Remand / Male and female
- Capacity: 60 (in 2009)
- Opened: 1976
- Closed: 2009
- Managed by: Custodial Operations in the ACT Corrective Services

Belconnen Remand Centre, or BRC, was an Australian remand custody facility located in Belconnen, Australian Capital Territory, Australia. The centre opened in 1976 and closed in 2009. At times, it held a small number of illegal immigrants.

When it was first established in 1976, the Belconnen Remand Centre was intended to hold around 16 people. The centre's construction had been considered and approved by Prime Minister Gough Whitlam's Cabinet in 1973.

Four men escaped the remand centre in July 1988 through a roof in the exercise yard.

In December 1992, then ACT Attorney-General Terry Connolly flagged that the remand centre should be replaced, due to its outmoded architecture and the high operating costs identified at the time.

The ACT Government made the decision to build a new prison, the Alexander Maconochie Centre, and to decommission the Belconnen Remand Centre, in 2003.

A human rights audit of the operation of the Belconnen Remand Centre and other ACT correctional facilities was conducted in 2007, identifying issues to be avoided in the new Alexander Maconochie Centre, and matters to be improved in the meantime prior to the new prison's establishment.
