= ACT Corrective Services =

Government agency of the Australian Capital Territory

Agency overview
- Jurisdiction: Australian Capital Territory
- Agency executive: Leanne Close, Commissioner
- Parent department: Justice and Community Safety Directorate (JACS)
- Website: https://correctiveservices.act.gov.au/

ACT Corrective Services (ACTCS) is an agency of the Justice and Community Safety Directorate (JACS) of the Australian Capital Territory government in the Australian Capital Territory, Australia. It is responsible for a wide range of activities and services in the area aimed at protecting the community and reducing offending behaviour.

As of July 2025, the Commissioner of ACTCS is Leanne Close.

== Operations ==
The ACTCS operates the following:

- Community Corrections
- Custodial Operations
- Offender Services and Corrections Programs
- Sentence Administration Section
- The Sentence Administration Board

=== Community Corrections ===
Community Corrections consists of:

- Community Operations
- Prisoner Employment Unit
  - New Employment Opportunities (NEO) Program, including Transitional Release
  - Community Service Work Unit
- Corrections Programs Unit
- Offender Services

==== Community Operations ====
The Community Operations Unit provides advice to Courts and releasing authorities on the background and attitudes of offenders on Community Based Orders (e.g. bail supervision, probation, and parole) and to refer offenders to appropriate community based or residential services to assist with addressing a variety of issues (e.g. drug and alcohol abuse, grief and loss issues, self-esteem and relationship issues). The Unit aims to reduce offending by the use of empirically sound risk assessment tools and a brokerage case management model, which targets criminogenic needs.

==== Corrections Programs Unit ====
The Corrections Program Unit was established in 2001 as the Rehabilitation Programs Unit. The Unit incorporates existing programs and services that focus on targeted intervention and supervision of offenders. The services of the Unit are consistent with a focus on specific programs for offenders that address identified risks and criminogenic needs.

=== Custodial Operations ===
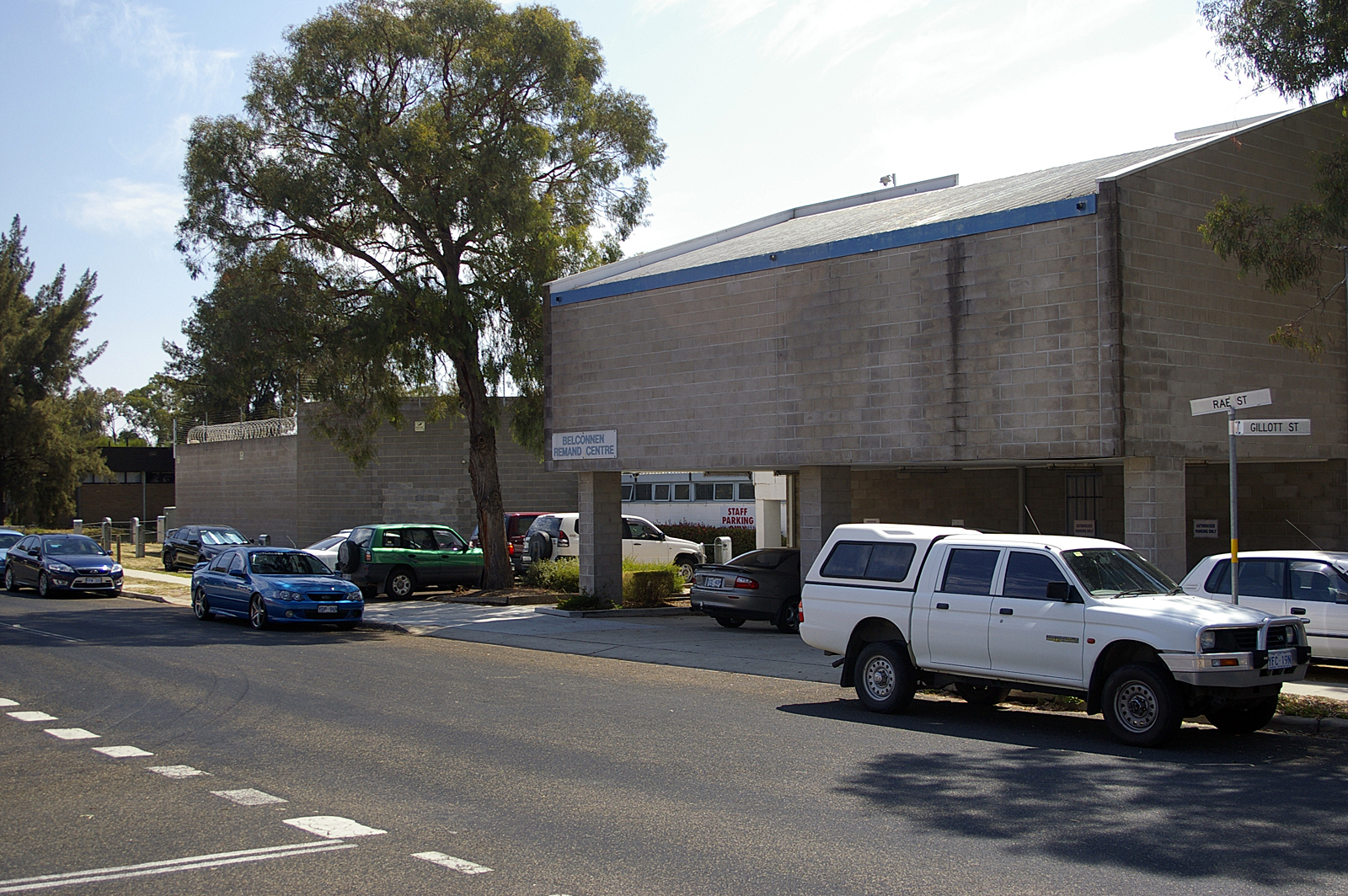
Belconnen Remand Centre

Custodial Operations consists of the following:

- Alexander Maconochie Centre
- Court Transport Unit

It also formerly consisted of the Belconnen Remand Centre and Symonston Temporary Remand Centre. The Belconnen Remand Centre opened in 1976 and closed in 2009.

Custodial Operations administrates the Corrections Management Act 2007 (CMA) governs the management of correctional centres in the Australian Capital Territory. The superintendent is responsible for directing and controlling the operations of the ACT adult custodial facilities. The facilities main objective is to carry out the mandate of the court and to ensure the provision of safe care and secure accommodation to those in custody in a controlled environment. The facilities have a responsibility to address a duty of care for each individual, accommodating both genders and a variety of cultures.

Under section 6A of the RCA an official visitor is appointed. The duties of this officer involve visiting and inspecting the facilities at least once each week, and inquiring into complaints by detainees.

==== Periodic Detention Centre ====
Periodic detention provides an effective alternative sentencing option for ACT offenders. Currently this sentencing option is served on weekends, starting on Friday 7.00 pm and ending on Sunday 4.30 pm. Detainees make a positive contribution to the community while serving their period of detention by performing unpaid community work. To accommodate the increased number of periodic detainees, ACT Corrective Services is currently investigating the possibility of extending periodic detention to mid-week.

==== Court Transport Unit ====
The Court Transport Unit is responsible for transporting prisoners between interstate correctional centres and the ACT, transporting prisoners and remandees (including juveniles) within the ACT, and the provision of safe and secure custody of prisoners and remandees in ACT Courts.
