= Urania Cottage =

19th-century women's shelter in London

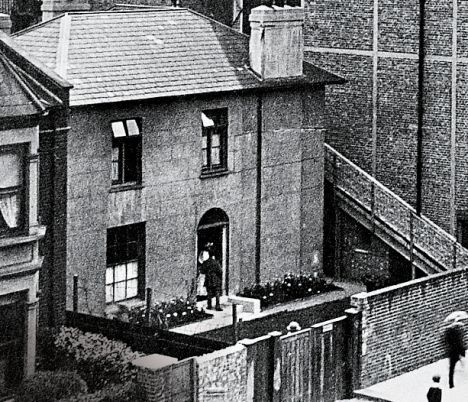
Urania Cottage, 1865 photograph

Urania Cottage was a Magdalene asylum, in the terminology of the time, hostel or women's shelter, founded in London in 1847 by the novelist Charles Dickens and the philanthropist Angela Burdett-Coutts. The house was a reformatory, and has been called a "discreet version" of London's Magdalen House for Reception of Penitent Prostitutes. In an anonymous article published in Household Words in 1853, Dickens called it a "Home for Homeless Women".

== Background ==
Angela Burdett-Coutts was the dedicatee of the novel Martin Chuzzlewit (1843–4). She gave Dickens the standing of the position of almoner in 1840. He screened the begging letters she received as a wealthy heiress. He also made suggestions for her philanthropy. They worked together on the Urania Cottage project. The fundamental objects of the hostel were to avoid the women housed ending up in prison or the workhouse. It also offered assistance in case they wished to emigrate to Australia, Dickens was the house's almoner, to 1855, and took charge of its day-to-day operations.

In the later 1840s, Dickens was under the influence of the thinking of the penal reformer Alexander Maconochie and his mark system. For around ten years he saw it applied at Urania Cottage. On 26 May 1846, Dickens wrote Burdett-Coutts a lengthy letter stating his desire to open an asylum for girls and women working in London's streets as prostitutes. He suggested introducing a mark system and probationary period for asylum residents. He wrote:

It is explained to her that she is degraded and fallen, but not lost, having this shelter; and that the means of Return to Happiness are now about to be put into her own hands, and trusted to her own keeping. That with this view, she is, instead of being placed in this probationary class for a month, or two months, or three months, or any specified time whatever, required to earn there, a certain number of Marks (they are mere scratches in a book) so that she may make her probation a very short one, or a very long one, according to her own conduct. For so much work, she has so many Marks; for a day's good conduct, so many more. For every instance of ill-temper, disrespect, bad language, any outbreak of any sort or kind, so many - a very large number in proportion to her receipts - are deducted. A perfect Debtor and Creditor account is kept between her and the Superintendent, for every day; and the state of that account, it is in her own power and nobody else's, to adjust to her advantage.

== Religious stance ==
The founders differed on religious matters, Dickens at this time associating with Unitarians and Burdett-Coutts being an Anglican evangelical; Dickens backed down at need, but was concerned to avoid a severe ambience in the house. He approved of reformed women from the house marrying, but she did not.

Burdett-Coutts required that the Urania Cottage committee should include an Anglican cleric. In 1848 John Sinclair, vicar of Kensington and archdeacon of Middlesex, was a member; also on the committee was the Rev. William Tennant, first vicar in 1847 at St Stephen's Church, Rochester Row, a new church funded by Burdett-Coutts. The Rev. Edward Arthur Illingworth, chaplain to the Coldbath Fields Prison (Middlesex House of Correction), was also chaplain to Urania Cottage.

== The house ==
Urania Cottage was in Shepherd's Bush, a suburb of south-west London that in the 1840s was surrounded by fields and market gardens but could be reached by bus, and a short walk, from Oxford Street.The house dated to the 1820s and belonged to a widow, Elizabeth Scott. It was a detached house, where 13 women and two superintendents could sleep. Dickens chose it, and was responsible for details such as reading matter and colourful dresses. The latter was a point on which he differed from Burdett-Coutts, and had his way. Purposes included education in household work and the development of self-discipline. Dickens dealt with petitions from the women, conferring at need with Burdett-Coutts.

== Wardens ==
Over the period 1847–1858 when Dickens was involved in running the house, there were three wardens or principal superintendents. The first, Mrs. Holdsworth, from 1847 to mid-1849, was succeeded by Georgiana Morson, a widow, who left in 1854 when she remarried. Dickens praised Morson's oversight at Urania Cottage in an 1852 letter recommending her as matron for the Foundling Hospital, in which he described her "capacity for the administration of such an office", going on to explain that "She is accustomed to method, order, punctuality, and to a habit of sound and judicious observation." Morson was replaced by Mrs Marchmont.

== Candidates, selection and outcomes ==
Dickens had included "A Visit to Newgate", referring to Newgate Gaol, in his collection Sketches by Boz (1836). He was keen on visiting London prisons, particularly in 1838–9. For Urania Cottage, he often went to the Coldbath Fields prison, to find women who might come to the house, and is thought to have based his character Mr Creakle of David Copperfield on the magistrate Benjamin Rotch he met there. Rotch was an opponent of ideas in penology that Dickens had floated in American Notes (1842), an advocate of the separate system, and a leader in the group of Middlesex magistrates who in 1847 were trying to impose that system in the county's prisons.

Places in the house were filled through Dickens's contacts George Laval Chesterton, governor at Coldbaths Fields prison, and Augustus Tracey, Chesterton's counterpart in Westminster; Dickens had introduced both men to Maconochie. A personal recommendation came through the Rev. Henry Drage, vicar of St. Margaret's Church, Rochester, formerly a neighbour of the Dickens family in Chatham, Kent. A refuge named for Elizabeth Fry opened in 1849 at 195 Mare Street, Hackney, as a half-way house, and referred some women to Urania Cottage. In 1850 Elizabeth Gaskell was concerned to help a 16-year old called Pasley, and applied to Dickens to see if she could be admitted to Urania Cottage. After some discussion involving also Burdett-Coutts, Pasley was found a place with a family emigrating to South Africa.

Over time, those admitted to the house became more varied: imprisoned sex workers were joined by women or girls convicted of crimes such as theft not connected to prostitution, and those who were homeless or destitute. Caroline, Duchess of Richmond recommended the larcenous Rhena Pollard, who was a troublemaker, hauled up before the committee and harangued by Dickens. An emigrant to Canada, she joined the Salvation Army. John Hardwick of Marlborough Street Magistrates Court in 1855 recommended to Dickens the domestic servant Susan Mayne who had a record of drunkenness and prostitution charges. She was admitted to the house, but it transpired that she was pregnant, so had to leave. The baby was born in the Queen Charlotte Lying-in Hospital, where her health and past history were more thoroughly examined.

A report in 1853, not associated with the founders' names, discussed the outcomes for 56 "inmates", mostly young women, with average age about 20. Of those, 30 had emigrated to Australia where seven were known to have married.

== After Dickens ==
In 1858 Dickens and his wife Catherine separated. This breakdown in the marriage put an effective end to the working relationship between Dickens and Angela Burdett-Coutts. The work of Urania House continued after Dickens, also in 1858, withdrew from his role there, for some years, encountering difficulties, and eventually ceasing.

Urania Cottage became part of Gaumont's Lime Grove Studios around 1915. The building was used for dressing-rooms and as offices for the studio. It was replaced by another house at the same time though when is unclear.

== In media ==
Stacey Halls wrote her 2024 novel The Household about Urania Cottage.
