= Walter Crofton =

Prison administrator in Ireland (1815–1897)

Sir Walter Frederick Crofton (1815–1897) was chair of the Board of Directors of Convict Prisons for Ireland between 1854 and 1862. He is sometimes cited as Alexander Maconochie's ideological heir.

Under Crofton's system of prison administration, known as the Irish system, prisoners progressed through three stages of confinement. During the first stage, the penal stage, prisoners were held in solitary cells for approximately nine months. The second stage involved communal labour in public works prisons. For the third stage, officials promoted prisoners in small numbers to "intermediate" prisons (essentially a halfway house, where they could run errands and attend church in the community) as a final test of their readiness for Irish tickets of leave.

A prisoner who received a ticket was granted conditional release into the community in which he would be supervised by law enforcement or civilian personnel, who were required to secure employment and to conduct home visits. The "supervisors" represented the forerunner to modern parole officers.
