= Alexander Maconochie (penal reformer) =

Scottish naval officer, geographer, and penal reformer (1787-1860)

Captain Alexander Maconochie
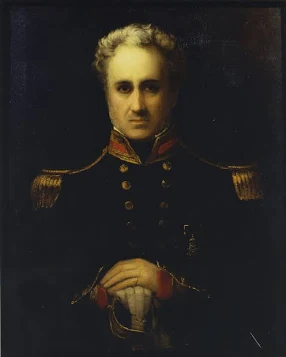
- 1836 portrait of Maconochie, aged 48-49
- Born: 11 February 1787; Edinburgh, Scotland
- Died: 25 October 1860 (aged 73); Morden, Surrey, England
- Resting place: St Lawrence Church, Morden, Surrey; 51°23′32.1″N 0°12′15.11″W
- Occupation: Naval officer
- Known for: Penal reform in Australia and England
- Military career
- Allegiance: United Kingdom
- Branch: Royal Navy
- Service years: 1803–1815
- Rank: Captain

Alexander Maconochie (11 February 1787 – 25 October 1860) was a Scottish naval officer, geographer and penal reformer.

In 1840, Maconochie became the Governor of Norfolk Island, a prison island in which convicts were treated with severe brutality and were seen as lost causes. Upon reaching the island, Maconochie immediately instituted policies that restored dignity to prisoners and achieved remarkable success in prisoner rehabilitation. Those policies were well in advance of their time, but Maconochie was politically undermined.

His ideas would be largely ignored and forgotten, only to be readopted as the basis of modern penal systems over a century later, during the mid-to-late 20th century. He was also the first professor of geography at the University College London.

== Early life, naval career and geographer ==
Maconochie was born in Edinburgh on 11 February 1787. At the age of 9, his father died and he was raised by Allan Maconochie, later Lord Meadowbank.

He joined the Royal Navy in 1803 and as a midshipman saw active service in the Napoleonic Wars, rising to the rank of lieutenant. In 1811 he was serving on the Brig HMS Grasshopper, which shipwrecked Christmas Eve off the coast of the Dutch coast. He, together with all those on board, were taken as a prisoner of war and extradited to the French. The forced march in the bitter cold winter of Holland to Verdun and more than two years of miserable imprisonment gave him an experience that he used later in his penal reform. He was released upon Napoleon's abdication in 1814.

He returned to active service in the British-American War in which he commanded HMS Calliope. In 1815, he was promoted to the rank of Commander.

In the peace following the final defeat of Napoleon, Maconochie spent 13 years in Edinburgh studying geography and geopolitics. At that time, he wrote extensively on steam navigation and the colonisation of the Pacific. He married in 1822.

In 1828 he moved to London, England, where he was the first secretary of the Royal Geographical Society in 1830. In 1833, he became the first professor of Geography at the University College London, and was a knight of the Royal Guelphic Order.

== Penal reformer ==
In 1836, he sailed to the convict settlement at Hobart in Van Diemen's Land (now Tasmania) as private secretary to the Lieutenant-Governor Sir John Franklin. There, he wrote a report strongly critical of the state of prison discipline. The convict system, being fixated on punishment alone, released into society crushed, resentful and bitter expirees in whom the spark of enterprise and hope was dead. Maconochie's report "can be said to mark the peak and incipient decline of transportation to Australia" when it was given to Lord Russell, the Home Secretary and ardent critic of transportation, according to Robert Hughes.

Although the report was used by the Molesworth Committee on transportation in 1837–1838, the criticism of that work forced Franklin to dismiss him.

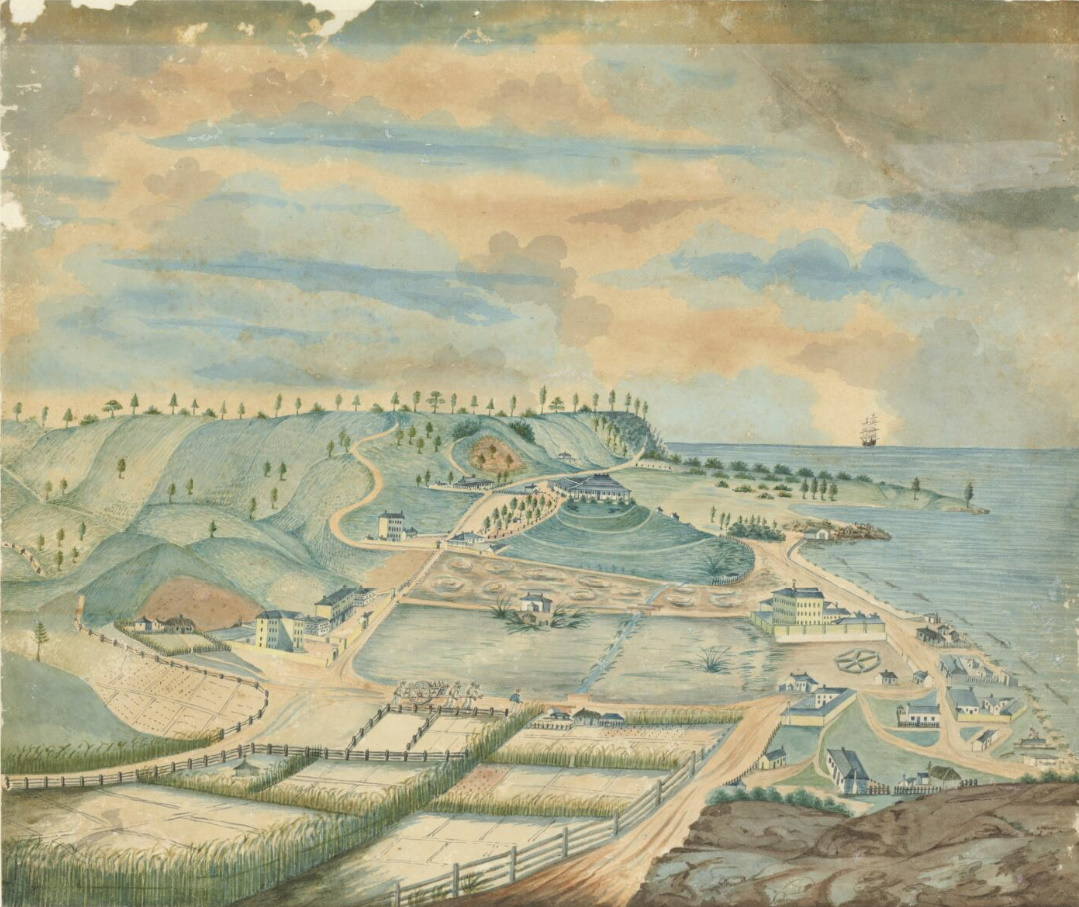
Norfolk Island convict settlement in about 1839; watercolour painting by Thomas Seller (National Library of Australia collection).

According to his biographer John Barry, Maconochie "was a deeply religious man, of generous and compassionate temperament, and convinced of the dignity of man". His two basic principles of penology were the following:

- as cruelty debases both the victim and society, punishment should not be vindictive but aim at the reform of the convict to observe social constraints.
- a convict's imprisonment should consist of task, not time sentences, with release depending on the performance of a measurable amount of labour.

Following the Molesworth Committee's report, transportation to New South Wales was abolished in 1840 although it continued to other colonies. Disturbed at reports of conditions on Norfolk Island, Lord Normanby, Secretary of State for the Colonies, suggested that a new system should be used, and the superintendence given to an officer deeply concerned with the moral welfare of the convicts. Maconochie was recommended to put the new system in place.

In March 1840 he took up duties as commandant of the penal settlement at Norfolk Island and applied his penal principles, known today as the "Mark System". Convicts were awarded 'marks' to encourage effort and thrift. Sentences were served in stages, each increasing in responsibility. Cruel punishments and degrading conditions were reduced, and convicts' sense of dignity was respected. Perhaps the fact that he had experienced the life of a prisoner himself played a part in his approach to his task. He was the only commandant with such an experience.

Those views contrasted greatly with the cruel conditions that had existed on Norfolk Island prior to Maconochie's arrival. He was not permitted to apply his principles to the 1,200 hardened twice-sentenced convicts but only to the 600 newcomers sent directly from the United Kingdom and who were separated from the 'Old Hands'. His Mark System was not permitted to reduce a convict's sentence, and it was difficult to find other incentives. His reforms were resisted by military guards, supervisors and constables (many of whom were ex-convicts) under his command.

In particular, his deputy held views opposite to his own. In an exclusively male environment, he found he was unable to reduce the prevalent 'unnatural offence' of sodomy, and he continued to punish it by flogging. Criticism of his methods in Sydney and England led Governor Sir George Gipps to visit the island in 1843. He was favourably impressed with the condition of the convicts and the effectiveness of the 'marks' system and reported that Maconochie's System of Moral Reform could work if carried through to its conclusion.

However, the order had already been given in the United Kingdom for Maconochie to be replaced. Under the commandants who followed him, Norfolk Island reverted to being an object of terror under brutal masters.

Almost 1,400 convicts had been discharged during Maconochie's term, and he always claimed that a high percentage did not offend again. He is known as the "Father of Parole".

== Later life ==
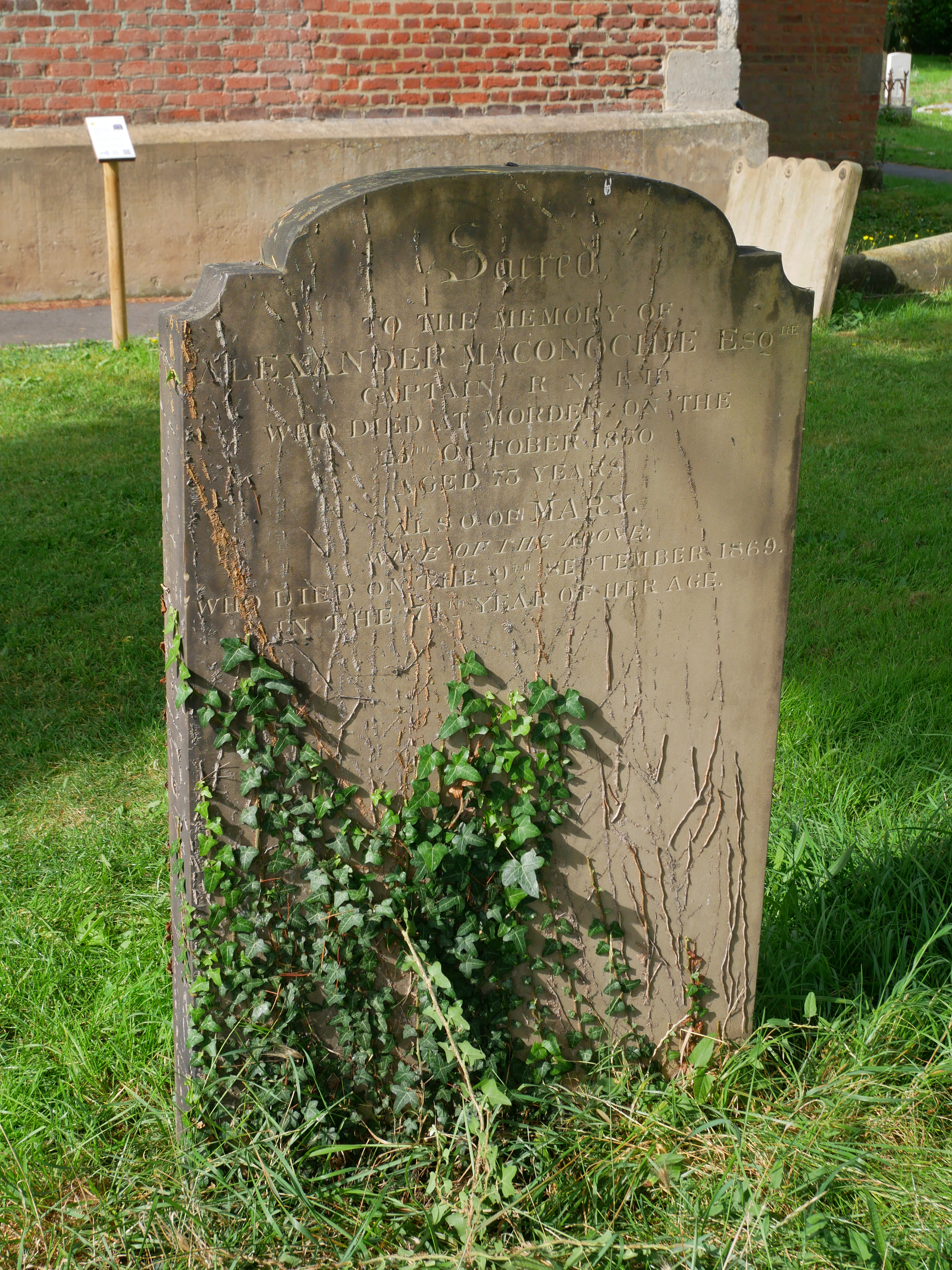
The grave of Maconochie to the east of the Church of Saint Lawrence, Morden

Maconochie returned to the United Kingdom in 1844 and two years later published a book outlining his system. It had an immense influence on the development of penology.

In 1849, he was appointed governor of the new prison at Birmingham but was dismissed and criticised for his actions although was praised for his humanity and benevolence.

He died on 25 October 1860 at Morden, Surrey. He had been still campaigning for penal reform in spite of ill health. He was buried at St Lawrence Church, London Road, Morden, Surrey. His grave and that of his wife Mary can still be seen in the churchyard.

== Legacy ==
John Barry states that "Maconochie was a pioneer in penal reform, and suffered the fate of men in advance of their times. His concepts and many of his practical measures are now the basis of Western penal systems".

The Alexander Maconochie Centre, a prison in Canberra, is named in his honour.

Sir Walter Frederick Crofton (1815–1897) introduced a variant of the 'progressive stages' system of penal discipline into the Irish convict prisons.

== Published works ==
- Australiana, or Thoughts on Convict Management, and other subjects connected with the Australian Penal Colonies. Hobart. 1838.; republished as: General Views Regarding the Social System of Convict Management / suggested by Captain Maconochie, Hobart Town: J. C. Macdougall, 1839.
- MacOnochie, Captain (March 1845). "Criminal Statistics and Movement of the Bond Population of Norfolk Island, to December 1843". Journal of the Statistical Society of London. 8 (1): 1–49. doi:10.2307/2337993. JSTOR 2337993.
- Norfolk Island. London. 1847.
- Secondary Punishment: The Mark System. London. 1848.
- The Principles of Punishment, on Which the mark System of Prison Discipline is Advocated. London. 1850.
- On Reformatory Prison Discipline. London. 1851.
