= Alexander Maconochie Centre =

Prison in the Australian Capital Territory, Australia

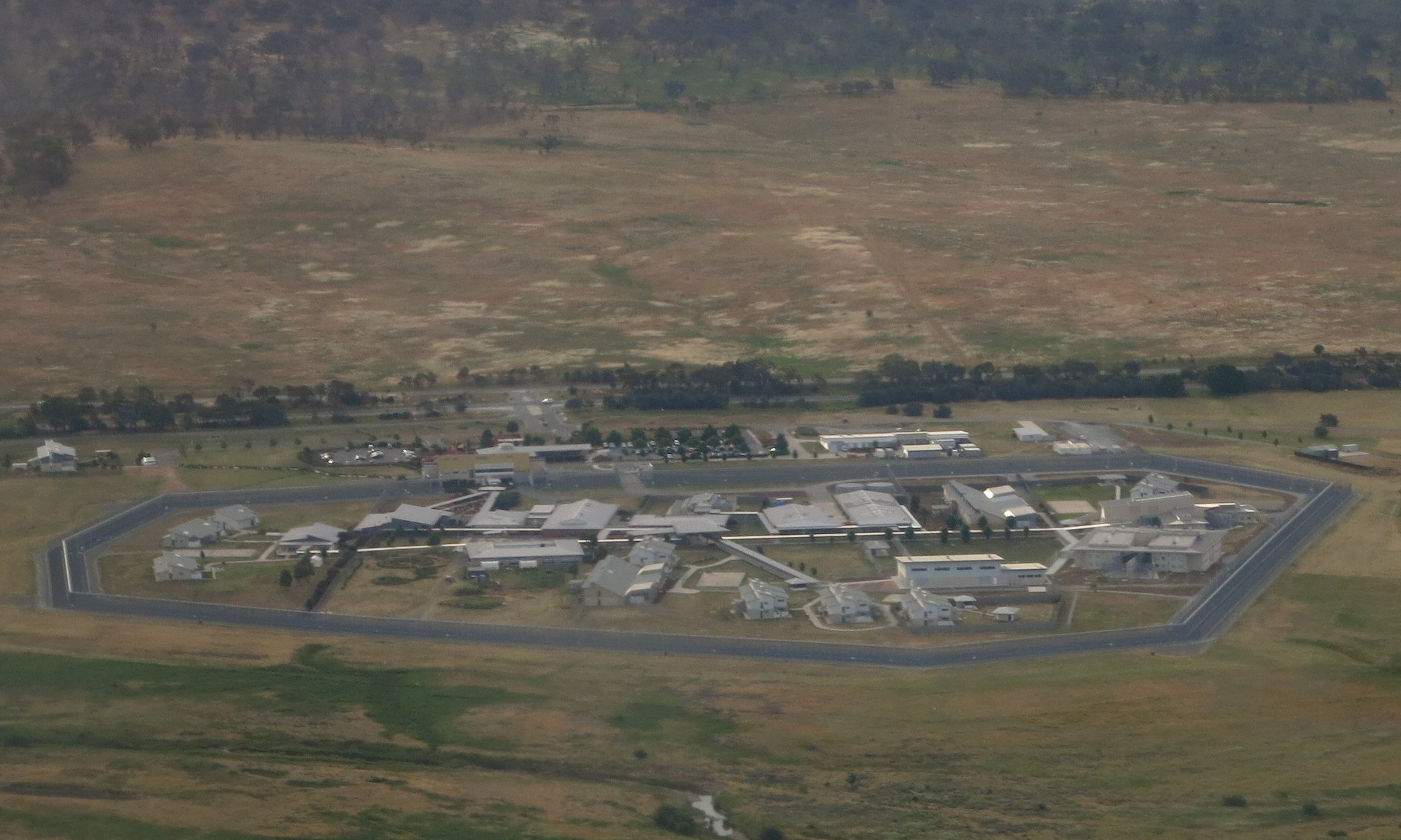
- Aerial view of the Alexander Maconochie Centre
- Interactive map of Alexander Maconochie Centre
- Location: Hume, Australian Capital Territory; 35.370943°S 149.171805°E
- Status: Operational
- Security class: Minimum to maximum / Remand / Male and female
- Capacity: 300
- Population: 365 (May 2021)
- Opened: 11 September 2008
- Managed by: ACT Corrective Services

The Alexander Maconochie Centre is an Australian prison in the Australian Capital Territory, which detains maximum security, minimum security and remand inmates, both male and female. It is located in Hume, Australian Capital Territory. The facility is operated by ACT Corrective Services, an agency of the Government of the Australian Capital Territory. The facility accepts remandees charged under Territory and/or Commonwealth legislation pending legal proceedings; and also detains convicted offenders who are sentenced to full-time imprisonment.

The centre is named in honour of penal reformer Alexander Maconochie, who worked in Van Diemen’s Land (Tasmania) and Norfolk Island from 1836 to 1844. It is also the Territory's first prison.

== History ==
The ACT opened its first prison, Belconnen Remand Facility, in 1975. It was designed to only house 18 prisoners, and was quickly overcrowded and criticised for not having suitable education facilities. By 2001, its operational capacity had been increased to 69. Belconnen only housed unsentenced prisoners, and those convicted were transferred to prisons in NSW and were managed by Corrective Services NSW on behalf of the Territory and/or Commonwealth governments. In 2004, in spite of localised opposition, a decision was made to locate the new prison, a first for the ACT, in Hume. The centre was officially opened on 11 September 2008 by the Chief Minister of the ACT, Jon Stanhope. and constructed at a cost of A$130 million. The first prisoners were accepted on 30 March 2009.

=== Controversy ===
The Alexander Maconochie Centre has been the subject of controversy during its planning, construction, and period immediately post opening. A chief criticism related to the facility's large initial cost estimates and even larger final cost. On 21 January 2009 the Standing Committee on Justice and Community Safety of the ACT Government resolved that it would inquire into and report on the circumstances surrounding the delay in the commencement of operations of the centre, the cost of delays to the ACT Government, as well as the impact of delays, if any, on the delivery of corrective services. At the same time, there was confusion between the ACT and the NSW Governments about willingness and ability of Corrective Services NSW to continue to accept ACT prisoners, due to overcrowding in NSW facilities:

The cessation of transfers of prisoners to NSW was never satisfactorily explained.... The cessation of transfers of prisoners to NSW in December 2008 added to the pressure on ACT remand facilities and contributed further to their failure to be human rights compliant.

In January 2010 it was reported that the average cost of housing an inmate in the Alexander Maconochie Centre is A$504 per day, more than double the amount the New South Wales Government charged the ACT Government for housing inmates before the Centre opened.

== Facilities ==
The centre was designed as a multi-role facility that replaced the Belconnen Remand Centre and provides full-time detention facilities so that prisoners who would previously have been held in New South Wales correctional facilities may be held locally. Accommodation includes cell-blocks, domestic style cottages, a medical centre and crisis support unit, a 14-bed management unit and a transitional release centre. Male, female, remand and sentenced detainees from low to high security classifications are accommodated. The idea is to reform prisoners, so that they can return to a normal life after their sentence is over.

It is the first prison in Australia that was purpose built to meet human rights obligations. The centre was designed with environmental principles in mind and includes initiatives such as below ground fresh water storage, grey water recycling for toilet flushing and irrigation, solar hot water and high grade building insulation. The prison can hold 300 prisoners. It is organised as a campus, with accommodation cottages around a town square that contains common facilities. There is a health building, admissions building, education building, a library and a visiting centre. The prisoners are expected to construct their own gymnasium. It is located on the Monaro Highway in Hume.

== Notable prisoners ==
- David Eastman – spent time at the Alexander Maconochie Centre during the final part of his wrongful imprisonment for the murder of Colin Winchester, Assistant Commissioner of the Australian Federal Police.
- David McBride – an Australian whistleblower who leaked information about the war crimes in Afghanistan.
- Witness J – an unknown former Australian intelligence officer, was held in secret at the Alexander Maconochie Centre before his clandestine trial.

== See also ==
- List of Australian prisons

== Bibliography ==
- "Inquiry into the delay in the commencement of operations at the Alexander Maconochie Centre" (PDF). Standing Committee on Justice and Community Safety. 3. ACT Government. November 2009. Archived from the original (PDF) on 25 April 2012.
