= Angela Burdett-Coutts, 1st Baroness Burdett-Coutts =

British peeress and philanthropist (1814–1906)

The Right Honourable The Baroness Burdett-Coutts
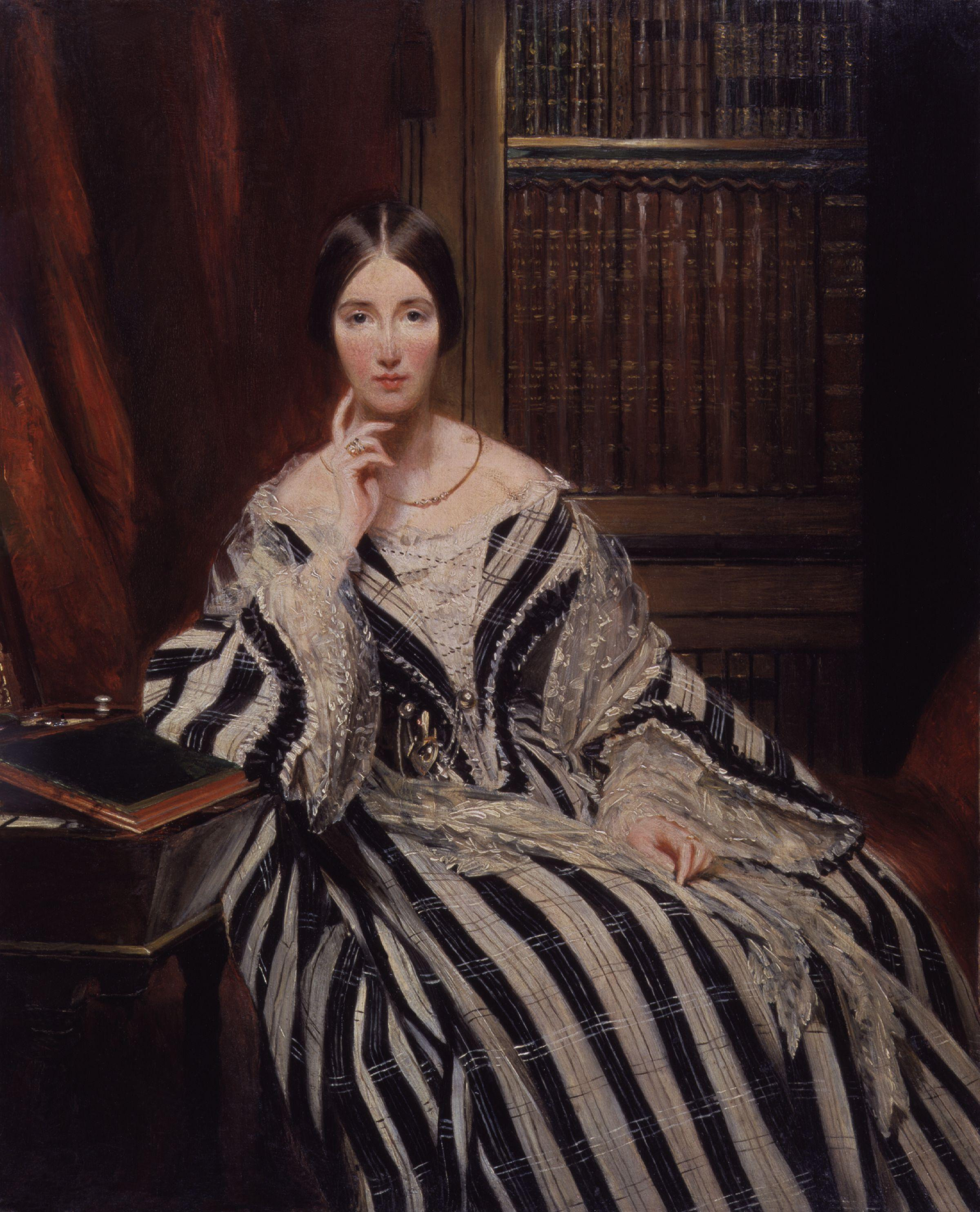
- Lady Burdett-Coutts, ca. 1840
- Born: Angela Georgina Burdett; April 21, 1814
- Died: December 30, 1906 (aged 92); Picadilly, London
- Burial place: Westminster Abbey
- Occupation: Philanthropist
- Spouse: William Lehman Ashmead Bartlett
- Parent(s): Sir Francis Burdett, 5th Baronet and Sophia Coutts
- Relatives: Thomas Coutts (grandfather)

Angela Georgina Burdett-Coutts, 1st Baroness Burdett-Coutts (née Burdett; 21 April 1814 – 30 December 1906) was a British philanthropist, the daughter of Sir Francis Burdett, 5th Baronet and Sophia, formerly Coutts, daughter of banker Thomas Coutts. In 1837 she became one of the wealthiest women in England when she inherited her grandfather's fortune of around £1.8 million (equivalent to £170,000,000 in 2025) following the death of her step-grandmother Harriet Beauclerk (née Mellon), Duchess of St Albans. As a condition of the inheritance, she conjoined the surnames of her father and grandfather, by royal licence, to become Burdett-Coutts.

In 1871 she became the first woman to receive a peerage in recognition of her own (rather than any husband's) accomplishments. Edward VII is reported to have described her as "[a]fter my mother, the most remarkable woman in the kingdom".

== Life ==
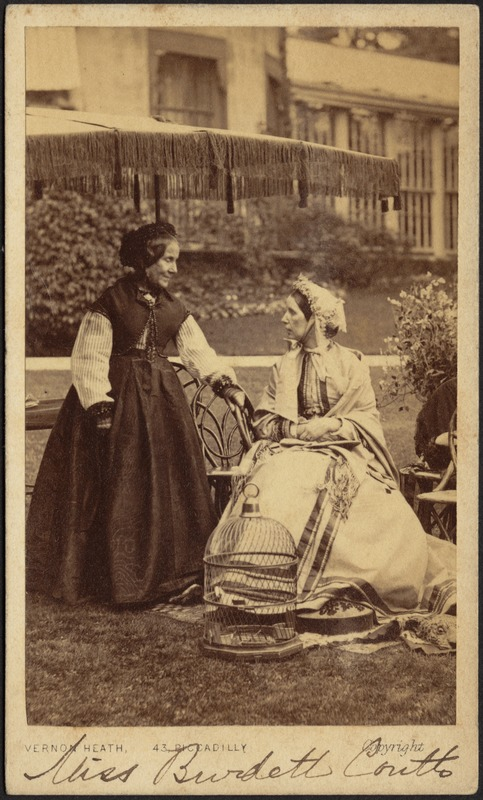
Burdett-Coutts' carte de visite

Burdett-Coutts was widely known as "the richest heiress in England". She was a collector of paintings, including Old Masters. Among the contemporary paintings she purchased was Robert Scott Lauder's Christ Walking on the Sea. The Reverend Richard Harris Barham, in a ballad (part of the Ingoldsby Legends) he wrote under the pen name "Thomas Ingoldsby" for Queen Victoria's coronation, referred to her as "Miss Anja-ly Coutts". She became a subject of public curiosity, receiving numerous offers of marriage. She inherited the country house at Holly Lodge Estate in Highgate, which was then just outside London, where she was famous for holding receptions.

Burdett-Coutts spent part of each year at Ehrenberg Hall in Torquay with her former governess and later companion Hannah Brown, to whom she was devoted. When Brown died in 1878, Burdett-Coutts wrote to a friend that she was utterly crushed by the loss of "my poor darling, the companion and sunshine of my life for 52 years". She was a friend of both Charles Dickens and Arthur Wellesley, Duke of Wellington, and she proposed marriage to the Duke despite him being 45 years her senior.

On 12 February 1881, when she was 67, she shocked polite society by marrying her 29-year-old secretary, the American-born William Lehman Ashmead-Bartlett, who changed his wedded surname to Burdett-Coutts and later became the MP for Westminster. The Ashmead-Bartlett family had emigrated to England in his infancy, but because of his American birth a clause in Angela's step-grandmother's will forbidding the Duchess's heir to marry a foreign national was invoked by Angela's next elder sister Clara Money, leading to a settlement in which Angela forfeited three-fifths of her income from the Coutts fortune to Clara, retaining two-fifths (some £16,000 a year) for life until Clara's son Francis Money-Coutts, 5th Baron Latymer, inherited the whole in 1906.

== Philanthropy ==
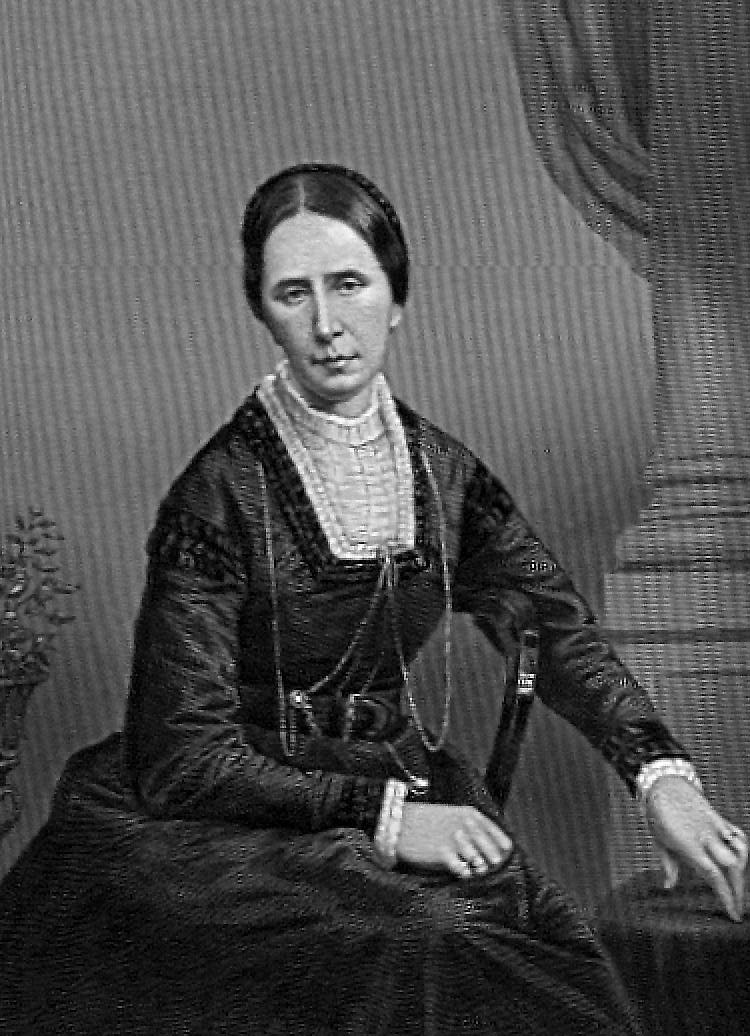
Angela Burdett-Coutts in later life

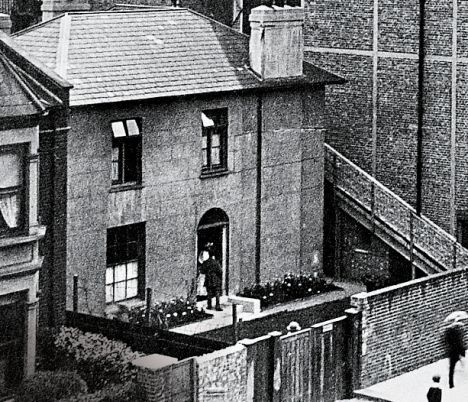
Urania Cottage, Shepherd's Bush

Burdett-Coutts spent the majority of her wealth on scholarships, endowments, and a wide range of philanthropic causes. One of her earliest philanthropic acts was to co-found (with Charles Dickens) a home for young women who had "turned to a life of immorality", including theft and prostitution. The home was known as Urania Cottage.

She avoided taking sides in partisan politics, but was actively interested in improving the condition of indigenous Africans, or the education and relief of the poor or suffering in any part of the world. Though she made no special distinction of creed in her charities, Burdett-Coutts was a notable benefactor of the Church of England, building two churches – including St Stephen's Church, Rochester Row, Westminster – and endowing church schools. As executor of the will of the Reverend Chauncy Hare Townshend (the author of several volumes of poetry), she, with the Rev. Thomas Helmore (also a poet), used money from Townshend's estate to build a primary school in Westminster, known as Burdett-Coutts & Townshend Foundation Church of England Primary School.

She endowed the bishoprics of Cape Town and Adelaide (1847), and the founding bishopric of British Columbia (1857). The granite Greyfriars Bobby Fountain in Edinburgh, with a bronze statue of Greyfriars Bobby, was erected by Baroness Burdett-Coutts. She was involved with the Royal Society for the Prevention of Cruelty to Animals (RSPCA). Burdett-Coutts was influential in the formation of the RSPCA's ladies committee in 1869 and was its first president.

In 1864, she financed the Ordnance Survey of Jerusalem; the primary goal of the endeavour was to find better drinking water for those living in the city. During this work (1864–1865), the group, led by Charles William Wilson, was able to produce the most accurate and comprehensive map of Jerusalem but was unable to find a new source of water. The Jerusalem Post commented that "Charles Wilson’s work on the Jerusalem Ordnance Survey served as the basis for all future Jerusalem research". Burdett-Coutts subsequently helped fund other explorations in the Holy Land, sometimes in conjunction with the Palestine Exploration Fund. This effort included a subsequent offer to fund another exploration to find water for Jerusalem, to be led by Charles Warren.

Burdett-Coutts founded Columbia Market in 1869, in Bethnal Green in the East End of London, the district where much of her work was carried out. With her project in Columbia Square she became a pioneer in social housing. Through her support of missionary and nursing efforts she was associated with Louisa Twining and Florence Nightingale. Her small housing development, Holly Village, on the corner of what was then her estate, is now in private hands and may still be seen in Highgate. She was also the president of the British Goat Society.

In 1884, she was a co-founder of the London Society for the Prevention of Cruelty to Children, which became the National Society for the Prevention of Cruelty to Children (NSPCC) in 1889; she also founded the Westminster Technical Institute in 1893.

== Selected other roles and projects ==
- President, British Beekeepers Association 1878–1906
- President of the Ladies Committee of the RSPCA (England/Scotland)
- Church bells for St Paul's Cathedral
- Cotton gins for Nigeria
- Only female Patron of Queen's Medical College, Birmingham. <College Calendar for 1858>
- Construction of the Angela Burdett-Coutts retail and wholesale produce market, which opened in 1869
- The Baroness Burdett Coutts Drinking Fountain in Victoria Park
- Drinking fountains for dogs
- Help for Turkish peasants and the refugees of the 1877 Russo-Turkish War, receiving the Order of the Medjidiyeh
- Housing schemes for the working-class along the lines of contemporary model dwellings companies
- The London Ragged School Union
- A sewing school for women in Spitalfields, when the silk trade declined
- Support organisations for the aboriginal peoples of Australia and for the Dayaks of Borneo
- Promotion of the fishing industry in Ireland by helping to start schools and provide boats; she also advanced £250,000 in 1880 for supplying seed potatoes to the impoverished tenants
- Placement of hundreds of destitute boys in training ships for the navy and merchant service
- Financing the first ordnance survey of Jerusalem in 1864, to improve its sanitation
- Supporter of the British Horological Institute
- Supporter of the Cotton Supply Association and contributed £500 in 1870 to the organisation
- Purchased more than 100 Greek manuscripts (532–546) from Janina (Epirus) in 1864, transported them to England between 1870 and 1872, and presented them to Sir Roger Cholmeley's School, Highgate School.
- The Burdett-Coutts Memorial Sundial, commissioned for St Pancras Old Church, listing the names of many people whose bodies had been dug up from the churchyard to make space for the Midland Railway.
- Created Holly Village, the first gated community, in 1865, in Highgate, London, which is a Grade II listed site.

== Honours ==
In 1871, in recognition of her philanthropic work, Queen Victoria conferred on her a suo jure peerage as Baroness Burdett-Coutts of Highgate and Brookfield in the County of Middlesex. As such, she became the first woman to have been made a peer in recognition of her own (rather than any husband's) accomplishments.

On 18 July 1872 she was presented with the Freedom of the City of London at the Guildhall, and in 1874 she became Edinburgh's first female Freeman upon being presented with the Freedom of that city.

A road in east London was named after her in 1862 and now forms part of the A1205 in Tower Hamlets.

Coat of arms of Angela Burdett-Coutts, 1st Baroness Burdett-Coutts
Escutcheon Quarterly, 1st & 4th Argent a stag’s head erased Gules between the attires a pheon Azure within a bordure of the last charged with four buckles Or, 2nd & 3rd Azure two bars Or charged with three martlets Gules. Supporters Dexter a stag Proper gorged with a riband Argent pendant therefrom an escutcheon of the arms of Coutts, sinister a lion Proper pendant from a like riband an escutcheon of the arms of Burdett

== Death ==
Lady Burdett-Coutts died of acute bronchitis at her home on Stratton Street, Piccadilly. By the time of her death she had given more than £3 million to good causes. Nearly 30,000 people filed past her coffin before she was buried on 5 January 1907 near the West Door in the nave of Westminster Abbey. She left no issue and the barony became extinct on her death. Preparations had been made to inter her ashes, but on the day of her funeral, Westminster Abbey unexpectedly received her uncremated body and was forced to bury her standing up.

A portrait of her is included in the mural of heroic women by Walter P. Starmer unveiled in 1921 in the church of St Jude-on-the-Hill in Hampstead Garden Suburb, London.

== Legacy ==
Charles Dickens dedicated his novel Martin Chuzzlewit to her and she had many royal and eminent friends. The book Flashman's Lady by George MacDonald Fraser makes reference to her (fictional) love for James Brooke (The White Rajah), and his rejection of her due to his physical affliction. She also puts a lecherous Flashman firmly in his place by dislocating his thumb. Angela Burdett-Coutts also features in Terry Pratchett's novel Dodger; in an afterword, he states that part of his reason for writing the book was to bring Burdett-Coutts to the attention of modern readers. George Meredith wrote a poem, 'Angela Burdett-Coutts', in her memory. Angela Burdett-Coutts is also a main character in the novel 'The Household' by Stacey Halls, published in 2024, about life at Urania Cottage and explores Burdett-Coutts' experience of being stalked by Richard Dunn for over a decade.

Peerage of the United Kingdom
New creation	Baroness Burdett-Coutts; 1871–1906	Extinct
