= Nicolai L. Volodos =

Ukrainian surgeon (1934–2016)

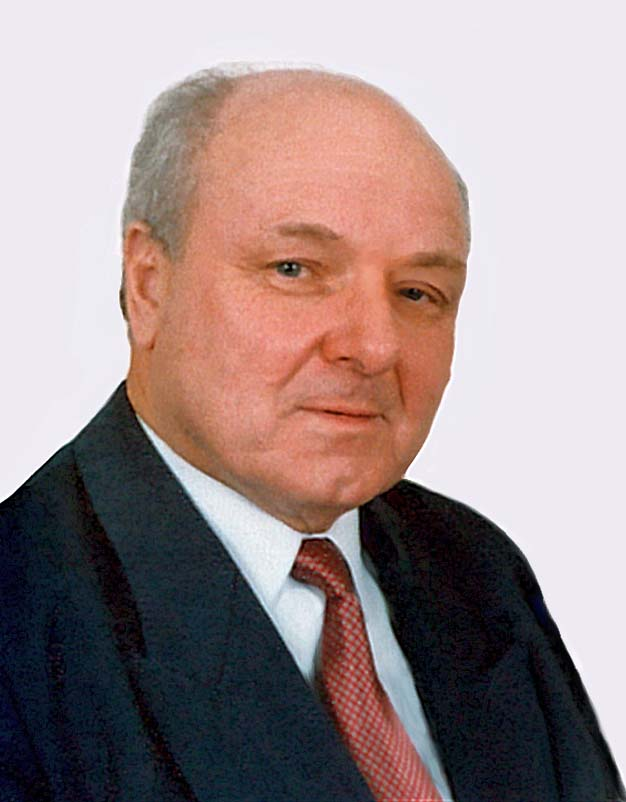
- Born: 15 May 1934; Poland
- Died: 3 April 2016 (aged 81); Kharkiv, Ukraine
- Citizenship: USSR, Ukraine
- Education: Odesa National Medical University
- Known for: Inventor of the stent graft for the treatment of stenotic and aneurysmal diseases
- Awards: Order of the Badge of Honour Medal "Veteran of Labour" International Bakoulev Award 2015 The Jörg Vollmar Medal by the Jörg Vollmar Foundation 2014
- Scientific career
- Fields: Cardiovascular surgery Endovascular surgery

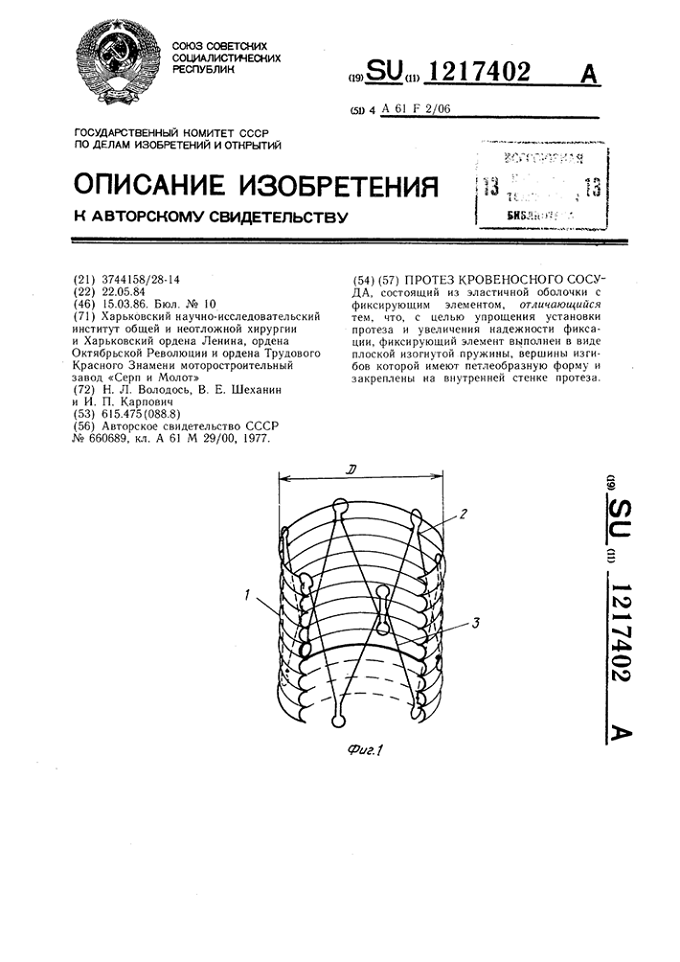
The world's first endovascular stent graft for the treatment of stenotic and aneurysmal diseases of arterial system in clinic (USSR patent of 22 May 1984)

Nicolai Leontievich Volodos (Nikolay, Nikolai, Nicholas), (Ukrainian: Микола Леонтійович Володось, Russian: Николай Леонтьевич Володось; 15 May 1934 – 3 April 2016) was a Soviet/Ukrainian cardiovascular surgeon and scientist. An innovator, Volodos developed and introduced into clinical practice the world's first endovascular stent graft for the treatment of stenotic and aneurysmal diseases of arterial system. Volodos was described by his colleagues as "a pioneer innovator and a giant in vascular and endovascular surgery" and "a giant of historic proportions in the vascular and endovascular specialties, and the father of endovascular grafting".

== Early life ==
Volodos was born in a small village Kokoshchitsi, near Slonim, Nowogródek Voivodeship (1919–1939), Poland. He was the second of three brothers.

== Years of activity ==
1952–1958 – Medical student at Odesa Medical Institute (currently Odesa National Medical University ), Odesa, Ukraine;

1958–1962 – General surgeon in Hirske, Luhansk Region, Ukraine, then Head of the Department of General Surgery at the Karbonit local hospital in Zolote, Luhansk Region, Ukraine;

1962–1965 – Postgraduate student at the Department of Thoracic Surgery and Anesthesiology, Ukrainian Institute of Postgraduate Medical Education, Kharkiv, Ukraine;

1964–1965 – Head of Ukraine's first Vascular Surgery Department, Kharkiv City Hospital No. 2;

1965–1972 – Head of the Department of Vascular Surgery, Ukrainian Institute for Hemotransfusion and Emergency Surgery (later, the Kharkiv Scientific and Research Institute for General and Emergency Surgery), Kharkiv, Ukraine;

1970 – Assistant at the Department of Thoracoabdominal Surgery, Ukrainian Institute of Postgraduate Medical Education, Kharkiv, Ukraine;

1971 – Ph.D. in medical sciences;

1972–2001 –Head of reorganized Department of Vascular Surgery at the Kharkiv Scientific and Research Institute for General and Emergency Surgery, Kharkiv, Ukraine;

1987 – Doctoral degree in medical sciences;

1992 – Professor at the Department of Cardiology and Functional Diagnostics, Ukrainian Institute for Postgraduate Medical Education, Kharkiv, Ukraine;

1992–2013 – Head of the Kharkiv Center for Cardiovascular Surgery, which Volodos founded in Kharkiv, Ukraine.

== Professional achievements ==
Volodos started his surgical career after graduating in 1958 from the Odesa Medical Institute in Odesa, Ukraine. During 1958–1962, he first worked as a general surgeon in Hirske, Luhansk Region, then as head of the Department of General Surgery at the Karbonit local hospital in Zolote, Luhansk Region. In 1962, Volodos become a postgraduate student at the Department of Thoracic Surgery and Anesthesiology of the Ukrainian Institute of Postgraduate Medical Education in Kharkiv, under the direction of legendary Soviet and Ukrainian surgeon Professor Alexander Shalimov. Under the supervision of Professor Shalimov and following his recommendations, Volodos performed experimental research on roentgenologic contrast examination and surgical treatment of coronary artery disease in dogs. That work was the subject of Volodos' Ph.D. thesis.

Shalimov performed many different types of surgery, including general, oncological, vascular, and cardiovascular operations. In 1963, Professor Shalimov established Ukraine's first vascular surgery department at Kharkiv City Hospital No. 2 (renamed after Alexander Shalimov in 2016). And, in 1964, Shalimov appointed Volodos head of the department. In 1965, Shalimov was appointed head of the Ukrainian Institute for Blood Transfusion and Emergency Surgery (later reorganized into the Kharkiv Scientific and Research Institute for General and Emergency Surgery). Volodos followed his mentor and became its head of Vascular Surgery department. In 1972, Shalimov left Kharkiv and moved to Kyiv to establish his new Institute for Surgery and Transplantation (now the Shalimov National Institute for Surgery and Transplantation), and Volodos assumed the role of senior vascular surgeon for the Kharkiv region, as well as Poltava, Sumy and Belgorod. In 1972, Volodos became the first surgeon in the Kharkiv region to perform selective coronary angiography and ventriculography in patients with ischaemic coronary artery disease. Then, in 1974, he was the first to perform an aortocoronary bypass procedure in Kharkiv.

Having been trained by Professor Shalimov, Volodos based his approach to clinical practice on Shalimov's two principles:

- Everything a doctor does should be centered on the needs of the patient.
- If you do not know of a treatment that will help your patient, invent one.

In January 1977, Volodos became the first surgeon in the Soviet Union to perform replantation of the arm after its traumatic transhumeral amputation. The case was described in the central press and became the catalyst for the beginning of microsurgery as a surgical specialty in Soviet medicine. Soon after that, new specialised microsurgical centers were founded in different regions of the Soviet Union.

In that same year, Volodos also performed Ukraine's first successful surgical repair of traumatic rupture of thoracic aorta. Soon after that, Volodos initiated several projects to improve the clinical examination and treatment of patients with diseases of the aorta and its branches. This included making advances in minimally invasive surgery for the treatment of aortic aneurysms. Volodos and associates developed the world's first stent graft, which was successfully used by him in clinic. That project resulted in the creation of the Z-stent (a self-expanding stent graft), and multiple delivery systems, which made new typed of endovascular procedures possible. Volodos developed the principle of building an endovascular stent graft as combination of a stent as its attachment mechanism and a vascular graft. Valves for transcatheter aortic valve implantation (TAVI); biliary, tracheal, and rectal stent grafts (currently called covered stents); and endovascular stents for peripheral arteries are all built on the same principle.

Volodos promoted the concept that vascular and endovascular surgery should be developed as an independent specialty in its own right. He founded the Kharkiv Center for Cardiovascular Surgery (KhCCVS) in 1992, which then evolved into an independent organization with its own clinical and scientific divisions. He remained head of the KhCCVS until his retirement in 2013.

Before joining any Western professional societies, Volodos was a member of the Association of Cardiovascular Surgeons of Ukraine and the Russian Society of Angiologists and Vascular Surgeons.

== Stent graft project ==
Volodos and members of his team primrily published in Russian and Ukrainian. .

Volodos and associates officially started their project in the early 1980s, after developing the Z-stent, an attachment mechanism for the stent graft in the form of a "radial zigzag-shaped cylindrical spring". Volodos named the new combination of the fixing element and synthetic vascular graft an "endoprosthesis", and he called the clinical practice of implanting these devices "remote endoprosthetics". The self-expanding endoprosthesis was patented by Volodos and associates in 1984 (USSR patent of 22 May 1984).

In December 1983, animal studies of the new devices in dogs and testing of the first delivery systems on human cadavers began. Before that, the original Z-stents were produced and tested on specially developed equipment. The first stents were made of medical stainless steel, in diameters of 0.6 and 0.7 mm. Before the stent was used as a part of stent graft, its properties were designed theoretically and calculated mathematically, particularly the radial force required for the safe fixation of the stent graft in human aorta under different conditions of pulsatile flow.

Volodos performed the first human implantation of the fabric-covered Z-stent on May 5, 1985, to treat iliac artery stenosis, in combination with elective femorotibial bypass grafting, in a patient with multilevel atherosclerotic lesions of lower-limb arteries, with good clinical results. During 1985 and 1986, Volodos performed 3 similar procedures with good results.

In 1986, Volodos started using bifurcated stent grafts for intraoperative grafting of the abdominal aorta. This shortened the time for which the vessel had to be clamped.

Volodos performed the first aortic stent graft implantation on March 24, 1987, to treat a post-traumatic thoracic aortic aneurysm. Over a follow-up period of 18 years, the patient had no complications. The patient died in 2005 because of pathology not related to the stent graft implantation.

Later, in 1989, in Kharkiv, Ukraine, Volodos and his team performed the world's first endovascular aneurysm repair (EVAR) procedure for treating abdominal aortic aneurysm (AAA). It was the first time the original unibody bifurcated stent graft and innovative delivery system were used. The endovascular procedure was converted to open surgery because of twisting of the unibody bifurcated stent graft's collateral limb. Subsequently, in May 1993, Volodos performed his first successful EVAR of AAA by using a bifurcated stent graft with a new delivery system. Several EVARs for AAA using straight tubular stent grafts were performed by Volodos and his team during the named period.

On 14 June 1991, Volodos performed a hybrid transthoracic operation with antegrade delivery and deployment (through the ascending aorta) of a stent-graft to treat a post-coarctation pseudoaneurysm of the proximal descending thoracic aorta.

On 19 August 1993, Volodos successfully performed the first ever thoracic endovascular aortic repair (TEVAR) in patient with a false aneurysm of thoracic aorta complicated by aortobronchial fistula.

By the early 1990s, he and his associates had accumulated a clinical experience of about 100 cases with stent-graft implantations in the abdominal and thoracic aorta and in other arterial beds. In parallel with clinical application of the original stent grafts, they continued work on evaluating different parameters of their devices and their hemodynamics; this work included mathematical modeling, in vitro experiments, and further testing of the devices on human cadavers. Volodos and his associates built research and manufacturing facilities at one center, allowing in-home production of the stent graft systems, their preclinical testing, and their clinical application.

In 1987, Volodos and colleagues published their work, describing the principles Volodos' stent graft systems and their components were developed and built on, along with a series of real clinical cases.

In 1989, he and his colleagues represented their own set for stent grafting at the Exhibition of Achievements of National Economy (EANE) of the USSR (EANE in Moscow) and UkrSSR (EANE in Kyiv). During the early 2000s, Volodos developed new advanced stent graft systems, including the new Z-stent made of Nitinol. It was manufactured at a Ukrainian industrial facility. In 2010, the first Ukrainian serial stent graft system was successfully used in clinic by Volodos' colleagues in Kyiv to treat a patient with AAA.

== Awards and honours ==
In 1976, Volodos was awarded the Order of the Badge of Honour (USSR).

In 1985, was awarded the Medal "Veteran of Labour" (USSR).

In 1989, Volodos and members of his team were awarded the I and II degree Diplomas of Exhibition of Achievements of National Economy (EANE) of the USSR (EANE in Moscow) and UkrSSR (EANE in Kyiv) for developing a new method of treating arterial diseases (stent grafting) and the set of surgical instruments for its implementation.

In 2011, was granted "The ISES Milestone Award". Became the ISES member in 2006.

In 2013, was accepted as Honorary Member of The Edward B. Diethrich Vascular Surgical Society.

In 2014, was nominated as Honorary Member by The German Vascular Society. At the same time, he was awarded the Jörg Vollmar Medal by the Jörg Vollmar Foundation.

In 2015, was honoured with the International Bakoulev Award «For the first in the World development and clinical use of stent graft for the treatment of thoracic aortic aneurism».

In 2015, was granted the ESVS Honorary Membership.

In 2016, the European Society for Vascular Surgery (ESVS) commissioned a keynote lecture to be delivered at the Society's Annual Scientific Meeting. In honour of his great achievements, ESVS named the lecture after Professor Nicolai Volodos. The inaugural lecture was delivered by Professor Ross Naylor (Leicester, UK) in Copenhagen in 2016 and he was succeeded by Professor Peter Gloviczki (USA) in Lyon in 2017 ^{[2]}, by Sumaira MacDonald (USA) in Valencia in 2018 and by Professor Krassi Ivancev (Germany) in Hamburg in 2019 ^{[1]}, by Dr.Claude Mialhe (France) in 2020, by Dr. B. Mitchell (USA) in Rotterdam in 2021, by Professor Gustavo S. Oderich in Rome in 2022.
