= List of commemorative coins of Ukraine =

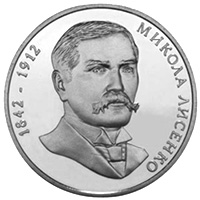
The "Mykola Lysenko" Jubilee Coin

This is a list of Commemorative and Jubilee coins issued by the Ukrainian government.

Since 1995, the National Bank of Ukraine has been issuing commemorative and commemorative coins made of non-precious metals. According to the material, they consist of cupric, nickel silver, zinc alloy or bimetal.

As of 28 July 2024, a total of 550 commemorative and commemorative coins made of non-precious metals were issued during the period of Ukraine's independence. Out of 550 coins, 12 coins are denominated in ukrainian karbovanets and 538 in hryvnias. Below is a classification of non-precious coins by date of issue.

== Number of coins ==
Year	1995	1996	1997	1998	1999	2000	2001	2002	2003	2004	2005	2006	2007	2008	2009	2010
Quantity	6	8	4	9	11	16	17	11	17	24	24	22	20	19	19	13

Year	2011	2012	2013	2014	2015	2016	2017	2018	2019	2020	2021	2022	2023	2024	Total
Quantity	16	19	22	27	23	31	36	28	21	23	22	17	14	11	550

== Ukrainian karbovanets coins of 1995-1996 ==
№	Event/Collection	Value	Mintage number amount	Date of issue	Obverse	Reverse	Series	In honor of
1	Victory in WWII	200,000	250,000	07.05.95			World War II	World War II
2	Bohdan Khmelnytsky	200,000	250,000	19.07.95			Outstanding Personalities of Ukraine	Bohdan Khmelnytsky
3	Hero City of Kyiv	200,000	100,000	23.08.95			Hero-Cities of Ukraine	Hero-Cities, Kyiv
4	Hero City of Odesa	200,000	75,000	23.08.95			Hero-Cities of Ukraine	Hero-Cities, Odesa
5	Hero City of Sevastopol	200,000	75,000	23.08.95			Hero-Cities of Ukraine	Hero-Cities, Sevastopol
6	Hero City of Kerch	200,000	50,000	23.08.95			Hero-Cities of Ukraine	Hero-Cities, Kerch
7	Lesia Ukrainka	200,000	100,000	01.03.96			Outstanding Personalities of Ukraine	Lesia Ukrainka
8	50 years of the United Nations	200,000	100,000	07.03.96			Other coins	United Nations
9	10 years of Chernobyl disaster	200,000	250,000	25.04.96			Other coins	Chernobyl disaster
10	100 years of Olympics	200,000	100,000	10.07.96			Sports	Olympics Games
11	The first participation of the Summer Olympics	200,000	100,000	10.07.96			Sports	First participation of Ukrainians of the Summer Olympics
12	Mykhailo Hrushevskyi	200,000	75,000	09.08.96			Outstanding Personalities of Ukraine	Mykhailo Hrushevskyi

== Coins of 2, 5 and 10 hryvnias ==
=== 1996-1999 years ===
№	Event/Collection	Value	Mintage number amount	Date of issue	Obverse	Reverse	Series	In honor of
13	Sofiivka	2	30,000	16.09.96			Other coins	Sofiivka Park
14	Desiatina	2	30,000	26.11.96			Spiritual Treasures of Ukraine	Church of the Tithes
15	Coins of Ukraine	2	250,000	12.03.97			Other coins	Coins of Ukraine
16	Yuri Kondratyuk	2	20,000	17.06.97			Outstanding Personalities of Ukraine	Yuri Kondratyuk
17	Solomiya Krushelnytska	2	20,000	12.11.97			Outstanding Personalities of Ukraine	Solomiya Krushelnytska
18	The first anniversary of the Constitution of Ukraine	2	20,000	01.12.97			Revival of Ukrainian statehood	Constitution of Ukraine
19	Volodymyr Sosyura	2	20,000	23.01.98			Outstanding Personalities of Ukraine	Volodymyr Sosyura
20	80 years of Battle of Kruty	2	200,000	30.01.98			Revival of Ukrainian statehood	Battle of Kruty
21	80 years since the declaration of independence of the Ukrainian People's Republic	2	200,000	20.03.98			Revival of Ukrainian statehood	Ukrainian People's Republic
22	Annual meeting of the Board of Governors of the EBRD in Kyiv	2	10,000	08.05.98			Other coins	European Bank for Reconstruction and Development
23	Askania Nova	2	100,000	20.05.98			Flora and fauna	Askania Nova
24	100 years of Kyiv Polytechnic Institute	2	50,000	28.08.98			Higher educational establishments of Ukraine	Igor Sikorsky Kyiv Polytechnic Institute
25	50 years of Declaration of human rights	2	100,000	24.12.98			Other coins	Declaration of human rights
26	Dormition Cathedral of the Kyiv Pechersk Lavra	5	200,000	24.12.98			Spiritual Treasures of Ukraine	Dormition Cathedral of the Kyiv Pechersk Lavra
27	St. Michael's Golden-Domed Cathedral	5	200,000	28.12.98			Spiritual Treasures of Ukraine	Cathedral of the St. Michael's Golden-Domed Monastery
28	80 years of Unification Act	2	50,000	18.01.99			Revival of Ukrainian statehood	Unification Act
29	Steppe eagle	2	50,000	28.01.99			Flora and fauna	Steppe eagle
30	Panas Myrny	2	50,000	07.05.99			Outstanding Personalities of Ukraine	Panas Myrny
31	100 years of National Mining Academy of Ukraine	2	20,000	10.06.99			Higher educational establishments of Ukraine	Dnipro Polytechnic
32	900 years of Principality of Novgorod-Seversk	5	50,000	25.06.99			Ancient cities of Ukraine	Principality of Novgorod-Seversk
33	Platanthera bifolia	2	50,000	26.07.99			Flora and fauna	Platanthera bifolia
34	Anatoliy Solovianenko	2	25,000	22.09.99			Outstanding Personalities of Ukraine	Anatoliy Solovianenko
35	500 years of Magdeburg rights of Kyiv	5	50,000	01.10.99			Spiritual Treasures of Ukraine	Magdeburg rights
36	55 years of liberation of Ukraine from fascist invaders	2	50,000	20.10.99			World War II	Liberation of Ukraine from fascist invaders
37	Garden dormouse	2	50,000	15.12.99			Flora and fauna	Garden dormouse
38	Christmas	5	100,000	29.12.99			2000 Years of Christmas	Christmas

=== 2000-2005 years ===
№	Event/Collection	Value	Mintage number amount	Date of issue	Obverse	Reverse	Series	In honor of
39	Ivan Kozlovsky	2	20,000	15.03.00			Outstanding Personalities of Ukraine	Ivan Kozlovsky
40	Vikentiy Khvoyka	2	20,000	29.03.00			Outstanding Personalities of Ukraine	Vikentiy Khvoyka
41	55 years of Victory in the Great Patriotic War of 1941-1945	2	50,000	25.04.00			World War II	Victory in the Eastern Front (World War II)
42	Triple jump	2	50,000	28.04.00			Sports	Triple jump
43	Parallel bars	2	50,000	28.04.00			Sports	Parallel bars
44	Bilhorod-Dnistrovskyi	5	50,000	29.05.00			Ancient cities of Ukraine	Bilhorod-Dnistrovskyi
45	Sailing (sport)	2	50,000	31.05.00			Sports	Sailing (sport)
46	Rhythmic gymnastics	2	50,000	29.07.00			Sports	Rhythmic gymnastics
47	Oles Honchar	2	20,000	31.07.00			Outstanding Personalities of Ukraine	Oles Honchar
48	Potamon	2	50,000	02.08.00			Flora and fauna	Potamon
49	125 years of Chernivtsi University	2	50,000	15.09.00			Higher educational establishments of Ukraine	Chernivtsi University
50	Christianization of Kievan Rus'	5	100,000	16.10.00			2000 Years of Christmas	Christianization of Kievan Rus'
51	100 years of Lviv Theatre of Opera and Ballet	5	50,000	19.10.00			Other coins	Lviv Theatre of Opera and Ballet
52	Kateryna Bilokur	2	30,000	28.11.00			Outstanding Personalities of Ukraine	Kateryna Bilokur
53	2600 years of Керчі	5	50,000	26.12.00			Ancient cities of Ukraine	Kerch
54	На межі тисячоліть	5	50,000	28.12.00			On the Edge of Millenniums	Dedicated to the transition from the second to the third millennium
55	Танці на льоду	2	30,000	30.01.01			Sports	Ice dance
56	На межі тисячоліть	5	50,000	07.03.01			On the Edge of Millenniums	Dedicated to the transition from the second to the third millennium
57	10 years of National Bank of Ukraine	5	50,000	29.03.01			Revival of Ukrainian statehood	National Bank of Ukraine
58	Eurasian lynx	2	30,000	25.04.01			Flora and fauna	Eurasian lynx
59	Ostroh Academy	5	30,000	28.04.01			Higher educational establishments of Ukraine	National University of Ostroh Academy
60	Good for children	2	100,000	24.05.01			Other coins	Children's Day
61	5 years of Constitution of Ukraine	2	30,000	26.06.01			Revival of Ukrainian statehood	Constitution of Ukraine
62	Hockey	2	30,000	06.07.01			Sports	Hockey
63	10 years of Independence of Ukraine	5	100,000	31.07.01			Revival of Ukrainian statehood	Declaration of Independence of Ukraine
64	1100 years of Poltava	5	50,000	15.08.01			Ancient cities of Ukraine	Poltava
65	Mikhail Ostrogradsky	2	30,000	20.08.01			Outstanding Personalities of Ukraine	Mikhail Ostrogradsky
66	100 years of Mykolaiv Zoo	2	30,000	21.08.01			Flora and fauna	Mykolaiv Zoo
67	400 years of Кролевцю	5	30,000	06.09.01			Ancient cities of Ukraine	Krolevets
68	Mykhailo Drahomanov	2	30,000	26.09.01			Outstanding Personalities of Ukraine	Mykhailo Drahomanov
69	200 years of Vladimir Dal	2	30,000	19.11.01			Outstanding Personalities of Ukraine	Vladimir Dal
70	Larix decidua	2	30,000	26.11.01			Flora and fauna	Larix decidua
71	10 years of Armed Forces of Ukraine	5	30,000	29.11.01			Revival of Ukrainian statehood	Armed Forces of Ukraine
72	Speed skating	2	30,000	30.01.02			Sports	Speed skating
73	Mykola Lysenko	2	30,000	26.03.02			Outstanding Personalities of Ukraine	Mykola Lysenko
74	Antonov An-225 Mriya	5	30,000	30.04.02			Airplanes of Ukraine	Antonov An-225 Mriya
75	1000 years of Khotyn	5	30,000	28.05.02			Ancient cities of Ukraine	Khotyn
76	Romny City — 1100 years of	5	30,000	26.06.02			Ancient cities of Ukraine	Romny
77	Swimming	2	30,000	27.06.02			Sports	Swimming (sport)
78	Eurasian eagle-owl	2	30,000	23.07.02			Flora and fauna	Eurasian eagle-owl
79	350 years of Battle of Batih	5	30,000	22.08.02			Heroes of the Cossack era	Battle of Batih
80	Leonid Hlibov	2	30,000	24.09.02			Outstanding Personalities of Ukraine	Leonid Hlibov
81	70 years of Dnieper Hydroelectric Station	5	30,000	02.10.02			Other coins	Dnieper Hydroelectric Station
82	Christmas in Ukraine	5	30,000	20.12.02			Ritual Festivals of Ukraine	Christmas in Ukraine
83	Boxing	2	30,000	28.02.03			Sports	Boxing
84	Viacheslav Chornovil	2	30,000	28.02.03			Outstanding Personalities of Ukraine	Viacheslav Chornovil
85	Vladimir Vernadsky	2	30,000	26.03.03			Outstanding Personalities of Ukraine	Vladimir Vernadsky
86	European bison	2	50,000	31.03.03			Flora and fauna	European bison
87	Easter	5	50,000	22.04.03			Ritual Festivals of Ukraine	Easter
88	Antonov An-2	5	50,000	22.05.03			Airplanes of Ukraine	Antonov An-2
89	Vladimir Korolenko	2	30,000	20.06.03			Outstanding Personalities of Ukraine	Vladimir Korolenko
90	Borys Hmyria	2	30,000	20.07.03			Outstanding Personalities of Ukraine	Borys Hmyria
91	2500 years of Yevpatoria	5	30,000	24.07.03			Ancient cities of Ukraine	Yevpatoria
92	Long-snouted seahorse	2	50,000	25.07.03			Flora and fauna	Long-snouted seahorse
93	100 years of world aviation and the 70th anniversary of the National Aviation University	2	30,000	22.08.03			Higher educational establishments of Ukraine	National Aviation University
94	150 years of Central State Historical Archives of Ukraine in Kyiv	5	30,000	19.09.03			Other coins	Central State Historical Archives of Ukraine in Kyiv
95	Ostap Veresai	2	30,000	23.09.03			Outstanding Personalities of Ukraine	Ostap Veresai
96	Vasyl Sukhomlynsky	2	30,000	30.09.03			Outstanding Personalities of Ukraine	Vasyl Sukhomlynsky
97	60 years since the liberation of Kyiv from fascist invaders	5	30,000	27.10.03			World War II	The liberation of Kyiv from fascist invaders
98	Andriy Malyshko	2	30,000	31.10.03			Outstanding Personalities of Ukraine	Andriy Malyshko
99	Bandura	5	30,000	23.12.03			Folk musical instruments	Bandura
100	Serge Lifar	2	30,000	25.02.04			Outstanding Personalities of Ukraine	Serge Lifar
101	2006 FIFA World Cup	2	50,000	27.02.04			Sports	2006 FIFA World Cup
102	Phocoena phocoena relicta (Азо́вка)	2	30,000	22.03.04			Flora and fauna	Harbour porpoise
103	2500 years of Balaklava	5	30,000	24.03.04			Ancient cities of Ukraine	Balaklava
104	50 years of KB Pivdenne	5	30,000	29.03.04			Other coins	KB Pivdenne
105	Antonov An-140	5	50,000	26.04.04			Airplanes of Ukraine	Antonov An-140
106	50 years since Crimea joined Ukraine	5	30,000	28.04.04			Other coins	Transfer of Crimea in the Soviet Union
107	50 years of Ukraine's membership in UNESCO	5	50,000	12.05.04			Other coins	On the 50th anniversary of Ukraine's acquisition of the status of a permanent member of the UNESCO
108	Trinity holiday	5	50,000	14.05.04			Ritual Festivals of Ukraine	Trinity
109	Марія Заньковецька	2	30,000	15.06.04			Outstanding Personalities of Ukraine	Maria Zankovetska
110	350 years of Kharkiv	5	30,000	01.07.04			Ancient cities of Ukraine	Kharkiv
111	Alexander Dovzhenko	2	30,000	05.07.04			Outstanding Personalities of Ukraine	Alexander Dovzhenko
112	Mykola Bazhan	2	30,000	26.07.04			Outstanding Personalities of Ukraine	Mykola Bazhan
113	Yuriy Fedkovych	2	30,000	26.07.04			Outstanding Personalities of Ukraine	Yuriy Fedkovych
114	Mykhailo Maksymovych	2	30,000	17.08.04			Outstanding Personalities of Ukraine	Mykhailo Maksymovych
115	250 years of Kirovohrad	5	30,000	20.08.04			Ancient cities of Ukraine	Kropyvnytskyi
116	Mykhailo Kotsiubynsky	2	30,000	20.08.04			Outstanding Personalities of Ukraine	Mykhailo Kotsiubynsky
117	170 years of National University of Kyiv	2	50,000	26.08.04			Higher educational establishments of Ukraine	Taras Shevchenko National University of Kyiv
118	200 years of Yaroslav Mudryi National Law University	2	30,000	30.09.04			Higher educational establishments of Ukraine	Yaroslav Mudryi National Law University
119	200 years of National Law University named after V. N. Karazin	2	50,000	05.10.04			Higher educational establishments of Ukraine	Yaroslav Mudryi National Law University
120	Mykhailo Derehus	2	30,000	25.10.04			Outstanding Personalities of Ukraine	Mykhailo Derehus
121	Nuclear power in Ukraine	2	30,000	29.10.04			Other coins	Nuclear power in Ukraine
122	Icebreaker "Captain Belousov"	5	30,000	16.11.04			Maritime history of Ukraine	Icebreaker "Captain Belousov"
123	Lyre	5	30,000	21.12.04			Folk musical instruments	Lyre

=== 2005-2009 ===
№	Event/Collection	Value	Mintage number amount	Date of issue	Obverse	Reverse	Series	In honor of
124	Borys Lyatoshynsky	2	20,000	05.01.05			Outstanding Personalities of Ukraine	Borys Lyatoshynsky
125	Vladimir Filatov	2	20,000	12.01.05			Outstanding Personalities of Ukraine	Vladimir Filatov
126	Ulas Samchuk	2	20,000	26.01.05			Outstanding Personalities of Ukraine	Ulas Samchuk
127	Pavlo Virsky	2	20,000	21.02.05			Outstanding Personalities of Ukraine	Pavlo Virsky
128	Maksym Rylsky	2	20,000	21.02.05			Outstanding Personalities of Ukraine	Maksym Rylsky
129	Sergei Vsekhsvyatskij	2	20,000	26.04.05			Outstanding Personalities of Ukraine	Sergei Vsekhsvyatskij
130	50 years of Kyivmiskbud	2	20,000	18.05.05			Other coins	Kyivmiskbud
131	75 years of National Aerospace University – Kharkiv Aviation Institute named after M. E. Zhukovsky	2	30,000	26.05.05			Higher educational establishments of Ukraine	National Aerospace University – Kharkiv Aviation Institute
132	Oleksandr Korniychuk	2	20,000	01.06.05			Outstanding Personalities of Ukraine	Oleksandr Korniychuk
133	Antonov An-124 Ruslan	5	60,000	01.06.05			Airplanes of Ukraine	Antonov An-124 Ruslan
134	Sandy blind mole-rat	2	60,000	15.06.05			Flora and fauna	Sandy blind mole-rat
135	Сорочинський ярмарок	5	60,000	17.09.05			Ukrainian heritage	Sorochyntsi Fair
136	1300 years of Korosten	5	30,000	19.08.05			Ancient cities of Ukraine	Korosten
137	350 years of Sumy	5	30,000	01.09.05			Ancient cities of Ukraine	Sumy
138	100 years of Institute of Viticulture and Winemaking named after V. E. Tairov	2	20,000	06.09.05			Other coins	Institute of Viticulture and Winemaking
139	300 years of Davit Guramishvili	2	30,000	19.09.05			Other coins	Davit Guramishvili
140	Dmytro Yavornytsky	2	30,000	22.09.05			Outstanding Personalities of Ukraine	Dmytro Yavornytsky
141	Intercession of the Theotokos	5	45,000	30.09.05			Ritual Festivals of Ukraine	Intercession of the Theotokos
142	Volodymyr Vynnychenko	2	20,000	30.11.05			Outstanding Personalities of Ukraine	Volodymyr Vynnychenko
143	Sviatohirsk Lavra	5	45,000	08.12.05			Architectural monuments of Ukraine	Sviatohirsk Lavra
144	Vsevolod Holubovych	2	20,000	20.12.05			Outstanding Personalities of Ukraine	Vsevolod Holubovych
145	500 years of Cossack settlement. Kalmius Palanka	5	30,000	23.12.05			Heroes of the Cossack era	500 years of Cossack settlement. Kalmius Palanka
146	Aleksey Alchevsky	2	20,000	26.12.05			Outstanding Personalities of Ukraine	Aleksey Alchevsky
147	Élie Metchnikoff	2	20,000	29.12.05			Outstanding Personalities of Ukraine	Élie Metchnikoff
148	10 years of Antarctic Vernadsky Research Base	5	60,000	16.01.06			Other coins	Vernadsky Research Base
149	Oleg Antonov	2	45,000	03.02.06			Outstanding Personalities of Ukraine	Oleg Antonov
150	Heorhiy Narbut	2	30,000	15.03.06			Outstanding Personalities of Ukraine	Heorhiy Narbut
151	100 years of Kyiv National Economic University	2	60,000	24.03.06			Higher educational establishments of Ukraine	Kyiv National Economic University
152	Vyacheslav Prokopovych	2	30,000	10.04.06			Outstanding Personalities of Ukraine	Vyacheslav Prokopovych
153	750 years of м. Lviv	5	60,000	26.04.06			Ancient cities of Ukraine	Lviv
154	Nikolay Strazhesko	2	45,000	28.04.06			Outstanding Personalities of Ukraine	Nikolay Strazhesko
155	Poecilimon ukrainicus	2	60,000	14.06.06			Flora and fauna	Poecilimon ukrainicus
156	Mykola Vasylenko	2	30,000	11.07.06			Outstanding Personalities of Ukraine	Mykola Vasylenko
157	Volodymyr Chekhivskyi	2	30,000	19.07.06			Outstanding Personalities of Ukraine	Volodymyr Chekhivskyi
158	10 years of Constitution of Ukraine	5	30,000	31.07.06			Revival of Ukrainian statehood	Constitution of Ukraine
159	15 years of independence of Ukraine	5	75,000	18.08.06			Revival of Ukrainian statehood	independence of Ukraine
160	Ivan Franko	2	45,000	23.08.06			Outstanding Personalities of Ukraine	Ivan Franko
161	10 years of revival of the monetary unit of Ukraine - the hryvnia	5	45,000	29.08.06			Revival of Ukrainian statehood	Monetary reform in Ukraine
162	Dmytro Lutsenko	2	30,000	08.09.06			Outstanding Personalities of Ukraine	Dmytro Lutsenko
163	Mykhailo Hrushevsky	2	45,000	27.09.06			Outstanding Personalities of Ukraine	Mykhailo Hrushevsky
164	Mykhailo Lysenko	2	30,000	16.10.06			Outstanding Personalities of Ukraine	Mykhailo Lysenko
165	Serhiy Ostapenko	2	30,000	30.10.06			Outstanding Personalities of Ukraine	Serhiy Ostapenko
166	Kharkiv National University of Economics	2	30,000	08.11.06			Higher educational establishments of Ukraine	Kharkiv National University of Economics
167	St. Cyril's Church	5	45,000	08.11.06			Architectural monuments of Ukraine	St. Cyril's Monastery, Kyiv
168	Vodokhreshche	5	75,000	18.12.06			Ritual Festivals of Ukraine	Epiphany (holiday)
169	Tsymbaly	5	100,000	22.12.06			Folk musical instruments	Tsymbaly
170	Sergei Korolev	2	35,000	12.01.07			Outstanding Personalities of Ukraine	Sergei Korolev
171	Les Kurbas	2	35,000	26.02.07			Outstanding Personalities of Ukraine	Les Kurbas
172	Aleksandr Lyapunov	2	35,000	12.03.07			Outstanding Personalities of Ukraine	Aleksandr Lyapunov
173	1100 years of Pereiaslav-Khmelnytskyi	5	45,000	25.04.07			Ancient cities of Ukraine	Pereiaslav
174	100 years of Motor Sich	5	45,000	22.05.07			Other coins	Motor Sich
175	Clean water is the source of life	5	50,000	25.05.07			Other coins	Water
176	Ilarion Ohienko	2	35,000	12.06.07			Outstanding Personalities of Ukraine	Ilarion Ohienko
177	Oleh Olzhych	2	35,000	26.06.07			Outstanding Personalities of Ukraine	Oleh Olzhych
178	XVI annual session of the OSCE Parliamentary Assembly	5	35,000	26.06.07			Other coins	XVI annual session of the OSCE Parliamentary Assembly
179	75 years of formation of Donetsk region	2	35,000	06.07.07			Regions of Ukraine	Donetsk Oblast
180	Olena Teliha	2	35,000	19.07.07			Outstanding Personalities of Ukraine	Olena Teliha
181	Orienteering	2	35,000	25.07.07			Sports	Orienteering
182	120 years of Odesa Opera and Ballet Theatre	5	35,000	25.07.07			Architectural monuments of Ukraine	Odesa Opera and Ballet Theatre
183	1100th anniversary of the chronicle Chernihiv	5	45,000	17.09.07			Ancient cities of Ukraine	Chernihiv
184	Ivan Bahrianyi	2	35,000	25.09.07			Outstanding Personalities of Ukraine	Ivan Bahrianyi
185	Petro Grigorenko	2	35,000	17.10.07			Outstanding Personalities of Ukraine	Petro Grigorenko
186	Buhay	5	50,000	07.11.07			Folk musical instruments	Buhay
187	The Holodomor is the genocide of the Ukrainian people	5	75,000	25.11.07			Other coins	Holodomor
188	200 years of Crimean resorts	5	35,000	28.11.07			Other coins	Crimean resorts
189	90th anniversary of the formation of the first Government of Ukraine	2	35,000	27.12.07			Revival of Ukrainian statehood	The first Government of Ukraine
190	Vasyl Stus	2	35,000	08.01.08			Outstanding Personalities of Ukraine	Vasyl Stus
191	Lev Landau	2	35,000	18.01.08			Outstanding Personalities of Ukraine	Lev Landau
192	Sydir Holubovych	2	35,000	26.02.08			Outstanding Personalities of Ukraine	Sydir Holubovych
193	Annunciation	5	45,000	31.03.08			Ritual Festivals of Ukraine	Annunciation
194	100 years of Kyiv Zoo	2	50,000	23.04.08			Flora and fauna	Kyiv Zoo
195	600 years of Chernivtsi	5	45,000	20.05.08			Ancient cities of Ukraine	Chernivtsi
196	Yevhen Petrushevych	2	35,000	23.05.08			Outstanding Personalities of Ukraine	Yevhen Petrushevych
197	Cinereous vulture	2	45,000	26.05.08			Flora and fauna	Cinereous vulture
198	850 years of Sniatyn	5	45,000	26.06.08			Ancient cities of Ukraine	Sniatyn
199	Georgy Voronoy	2	35,000	25.07.08			Outstanding Personalities of Ukraine	Georgy Voronoy
200	Christianization of Kievan Rus'	5	45,000	09.09.08			Other coins	Christianization of Kievan Rus'
201	Natalia Uzhviy	2	35,000	09.09.08			Outstanding Personalities of Ukraine	Natalia Uzhviy
202	175 years of the state dendrological park "Trostianets"	5	45,000	15.09.08			Flora and fauna	Dendrological park "Trostianets"
203	725 years of Rivne	5	45,000	19.09.08			Ancient cities of Ukraine	Rivne
204	90 years of the formation of the West Ukrainian People's Republic	2	35,000	03.11.08			Revival of Ukrainian statehood	West Ukrainian People's Republic
205	Hryhorii Kvitka-Osnovianenko	2	35,000	18.11.08			Outstanding Personalities of Ukraine	Hryhorii Kvitka-Osnovianenko
206	140th anniversary of the All-Ukrainian Society "Prosvita" named after Taras Shevchenko	5	45,000	01.12.08			Ukrainian heritage	Prosvita
207	975 years of Bohuslav	5	45,000	05.12.08			Ancient cities of Ukraine	Bohuslav
208	Vasyl Symonenko	2	35,000	25.12.08			Outstanding Personalities of Ukraine	Vasyl Symonenko
209	Pavlo Chubynskyi	2	35,000	14.01.09			Outstanding Personalities of Ukraine	Pavlo Chubynskyi
210	70 years of the proclamation of Carpatho-Ukraine	2	35,000	13.03.09			Revival of Ukrainian statehood	Carpatho-Ukraine
211	Andriy Livytskyi	2	35,000	27.03.09			Outstanding Personalities of Ukraine	Andriy Livytskyi
212	Ukrainian pysanka	5	50,000	16.04.09			Ukrainian heritage	Egg decorating in Slavic culture
213	60 years of Taras Shevchenko National Museum	5	30,000	29.04.09			Other coins	Taras Shevchenko National Museum
214	Borys Martos	2	35,000	29.05.09			Outstanding Personalities of Ukraine	Borys Martos
215	Symon Petliura	2	35,000	29.05.09			Outstanding Personalities of Ukraine	Symon Petliura
216	Igor Sikorsky	2	35,000	29.05.09			Outstanding Personalities of Ukraine	Igor Sikorsky
217	225 years of Simferopol	5	45,000	01.06.09			Ancient cities of Ukraine	Simferopol
218	Bokorash	5	45,000	28.07.09			Folk crafts of Ukraine	Rafts
219	60 years of Council of Europe	5	45,000	20.08.09			Other coins	Council of Europe
220	Nikolay Bogolyubov	2	35,000	20.08.09			Outstanding Personalities of Ukraine	Nikolay Bogolyubov
221	220 years of Mykolaiv	5	35,000	07.09.09			Ancient cities of Ukraine	Mykolaiv
222	Volodymyr Ivasyuk	2	35,000	29.09.09			Outstanding Personalities of Ukraine	Volodymyr Ivasyuk
223	International Year of Astronomy	5	45,000	14.10.09			Other coins	International Year of Astronomy
224	Bohdan Ihor Antonych	2	35,000	28.10.09			Outstanding Personalities of Ukraine	Bohdan Ihor Antonych
225	Kost Levytsky	2	35,000	26.11.09			Outstanding Personalities of Ukraine	Kost Levytsky
226	70 years of formation of Zaporizhzhia Oblast	2	45,000	17.12.09			Regions of Ukraine	Zaporizhzhia Oblast
227	Wheelwright	5	45,000	28.12.09			Folk crafts of Ukraine	Wheelwright

=== 2010-2014 ===
№	Event/Collection	Value	Mintage number amount	Date of issue	Obverse	Reverse	Series	In honor of
228	165 years of the Astronomical Observatory of Kyiv National University	5	45,000	28.01.10			Other coins	Astronomical Observatory of Kyiv University
229	100th anniversary of Ukrainian ice hockey	2	35,000	25.03.10			Sports	Ice hockey
230	165 years of Lviv Polytechnic National University	2	45,000	28.05.10			Higher educational establishments of Ukraine	Lviv Polytechnic
231	Ivan Kozhedub	2	35,000	01.06.10			Outstanding Personalities of Ukraine	Ivan Kozhedub
232	Ukrainian Kovyla	2	35,000	29.06.10			Flora and fauna	Stipa ucrainica
233	20th anniversary of the adoption of the Declaration on State Sovereignty of Ukraine	2	35,000	15.07.10			Revival of Ukrainian statehood	Declaration on State Sovereignty of Ukraine
234	Weaver	5	45,000	28.07.10			Folk crafts of Ukraine	Textile industry
235	Spas	5	45,000	28.07.10			Ritual Festivals of Ukraine	Apple Feast of the Saviour
236	925 years of Lutsk	5	45,000	28.07.10			Ancient cities of Ukraine	Lutsk
237	125 years of the National Technical University "Kharkiv Polytechnic Institute"	2	50,000	30.08.10			Higher educational establishments of Ukraine	Kharkiv Polytechnic Institute
238	Ukrainian Medical Society	2	35,000	24.09.10			Other coins	Ukrainian Medical Society
239	Potter	5	45,000	06.12.10			Folk crafts of Ukraine	Pottery
240	Cossack boat	5	45,000	20.12.10			Maritime history of Ukraine	Chaika (boat)
241	350 years of Lvivskyi natsionalnyi universitet imeni Ivana Franka	2	45,000	20.01.11			Higher educational establishments of Ukraine	University of Lviv
242	Blacksmith	5	45,000	28.03.11			Folk crafts of Ukraine	Forging
243	The last path of Kobzar	5	35,000	29.04.11			Ukrainian heritage	Reburial of Taras Shevchenko
244	50th anniversary of the Shevchenko National Prize	5	35,000	12.05.11			Ukrainian heritage	Shevchenko National Prize
245	15 years of Constitution of Ukraine	5	30,000	30.05.11			Revival of Ukrainian statehood	Constitution of Ukraine
246	800 years of Zbarazh	5	35,000	30.06.11			Ancient cities of Ukraine	Zbarazh
247	St Andrew's Church	5	45,000	20.07.11			Architectural monuments of Ukraine	St Andrew's Church, Kyiv
248	Hopak	5	45,000	29.07.11			Ukrainian heritage	Hopak
249	20 years of independence of Ukraine	5	45,000	19.08.11			Revival of Ukrainian statehood	Independence of Ukraine
250	20 years of CIS	2	30,000	28.10.11			Other coins	Commonwealth of Independent States
251	International Year of Forests	5	30,000	24.11.11			Other coins	International Year of Forests
252	UEFA Euro 2012	5	100,000	23.12.11			Sports	UEFA Euro 2012
253	UEFA Euro 2012, Kharkiv	5	100,000	23.12.11			Sports	UEFA Euro 2012
254	UEFA Euro 2012, Lviv	5	100,000	23.12.11			Sports	UEFA Euro 2012
255	UEFA Euro 2012, Donetsk	5	100,000	23.12.11			Sports	UEFA Euro 2012
256	UEFA Euro 2012, Kyiv	5	100,000	23.12.11			Sports	UEFA Euro 2012
257	Gutnik	5	35,000	28.02.12			Folk crafts of Ukraine	Glass production
258	350 years of Ivano-Frankivsk	5	35,000	26.04.12			Ancient cities of Ukraine	Ivano-Frankivsk
259	Sydir Kovpak	2	15,000	08.06.12			Outstanding Personalities of Ukraine	Sydir Kovpak
260	200 years of Nikitsky Botanical Garden	5	35,000	26.06.12			Other coins	Nikitsky Botanical Garden
261	Games XXX Olympics in London	2	30,000	12.07.12			Sports	2012 Summer Olympics
262	Yelets Holy Dormition Monastery	5	35,000	27.07.12			Architectural monuments of Ukraine	Eletsky Monastery
263	Skinner	5	30,000	16.08.12			Folk crafts of Ukraine	Fur clothing
264	Paralympic Games	2	30,000	20.08.12			Sports	Paralympic Games
265	Antiquity shipping	5	30,000	30.08.12			Maritime history of Ukraine	Antiquity shipping
266	1800 years of Sudak	5	30,000	17.09.12			Ancient cities of Ukraine	Sudak
267	Mikhail Kravchuk	2	15,000	20.09.12			Outstanding Personalities of Ukraine	Mikhail Kravchuk
268	500 years of Chyhyryn	5	30,000	10.10.12			Ancient cities of Ukraine	Chyhyryn
269	Ukrainian lyrical song	5	30,000	29.10.12			Ukrainian heritage	Ukrainian lyrical song
270	Synagogue in Zhovkva	5	35,000	22.11.12			Architectural monuments of Ukraine	Great Synagogue (Zhovkva)
271	Kacha is a stage in the history of domestic aviation	5	20,000	22.11.12			Other coins	Kacha, Sevastopol
272	Sterlet	2	35,000	27.11.12			Flora and fauna	Sterlet
273	75 years of Zhytomyr Oblast	5	15,000	29.11.12			Regions of Ukraine	Zhytomyr Oblast
274	75 years of Mykolaiv Oblast	5	15,000	29.11.12			Regions of Ukraine	Mykolaiv Oblast
275	World Year of the Bat	5	20,000	15.12.12			Other coins	World Year of the Bat
276	Great bustard	2	30,000	26.04.13			Flora and fauna	Great bustard
277	House with Chimaeras	5	30,000	15.05.13			Architectural monuments of Ukraine	House with Chimaeras
278	75 years of Luhansk Oblast	5	20,000	28.05.13			Regions of Ukraine	Luhansk Oblast
279	World Youth Championships in Athletics	2	20,000	26.05.13			Sports	2013 World Youth Championships in Athletics
280	1025 years of Christianization of Kievan Rus'	5	30,000	03.07.13			Other coins	Christianization of Kievan Rus'
281	100 years of Kyiv Scientific Research Institute of Forensic Expertise	5	15,000	03.07.13			Other coins	Kyiv Scientific Research Institute of Forensic Expertise
282	Ukrainian vyshyvanka	5	30,000	20.08.13			Ukrainian heritage	Ukrainian vyshyvanka
283	The liberation of Kharkiv from the fascist invaders	5	20,000	21.08.13			World War II	The liberation of Kharkiv from the fascist invaders
284	World Rhythmic Gymnastics Championships	2	20,000	22.08.13			Sports	2013 World Rhythmic Gymnastics Championships
285	650 years since the first written mention of Vinnytsia	5	30,000	28.08.13			Ancient cities of Ukraine	Vinnytsia
286	Nesterov loop	5	30,000	28.08.13			Other coins	Nesterov loop
287	The Poet's House	5	20,000	12.09.13			Other coins	House-museum of Maximilian Voloshin
288	150 years of National Philharmonic of Ukraine	2	20,000	12.09.13			Other coins	National Philharmonic of Ukraine
289	Liberation of Donbas from fascist invaders	5	30,000	30.09.13			World War II	Liberation of Donbas from fascist invaders
290	Breakthrough of the German defense line "Votan" by the Soviet troops and the liberation of Melitopol	5	30,000	16.10.13			World War II	Melitopol offensive, Panther–Wotan line
291	Olha Kobylianska	2	20,000	25.10.13			Outstanding Personalities of Ukraine	Olha Kobylianska
292	Nestor Makhno	2	30,000	25.10.13			Outstanding Personalities of Ukraine	Nestor Makhno
293	Battle of the Dnieper	5	30,000	30.10.13			World War II	Battle of the Dnieper
294	100 years of the Ukrainian National Tchaikovsky Academy of Music	2	20,000	01.11.13			Higher educational establishments of Ukraine	Ukrainian National Tchaikovsky Academy of Music
295	Borys Hrinchenko	2	20,000	22.11.13			Outstanding Personalities of Ukraine	Borys Hrinchenko
296	Battleship "Slava Kateryna"	5	30,000	18.12.13			Maritime history of Ukraine	Battleship "Slava Kateryna"
297	1120 years of Uzhhorod	5	30,000	25.12.13			Ancient cities of Ukraine	Uzhhorod
298	60 years of Cherkasy Oblast	5	20,000	03.01.14			Regions of Ukraine	Cherkasy Oblast
299	75 years of Kirovohrad Oblast	5	20,000	09.01.14			Regions of Ukraine	Kirovohrad Oblast
300	75 years of Sumy Oblast	5	20,000	09.01.14			Regions of Ukraine	Sumy Oblast
301	XXII Winter Olympics	2	15,000	03.02.14			Sports	2014 Winter Olympics
302	The liberation of Nikopol from the fascist invaders	5	20,000	07.02.14			World War II	Nikopol
303	Корсунь-Шевченківська битва	5	30,000	17.02.14			World War II	Battle of Korsun–Cherkassy
304	Evgeny Bereznyak	2	20,000	25.02.14			Outstanding Personalities of Ukraine	Evgeny Bereznyak
305	200 years of Taras Shevchenko	5	30,000	07.03.14			Spiritual treasures of Ukraine	Taras Shevchenko
306	75 years of Zaporizhia oblast	5	20,000	25.03.14			Regions of Ukraine	Zaporizhia oblast
307	70 years of Kherson oblast	5	20,000	28.03.14			Regions of Ukraine	Kherson oblast
308	Volodymyr Sergeev	2	20,000	11.04.14			Outstanding Personalities of Ukraine	Volodymyr Sergeev
309	Anne of Kyiv	2	20,000	22.05.14			Outstanding Personalities of Ukraine	Anne of Kyiv
310	220 years of Odesa	5	30,000	28.05.14			Ancient cities of Ukraine	Odesa
311	John Hughes	2	20,000	18.07.14			Outstanding Personalities of Ukraine	John Hughes (businessman)
312	180 years of Kyiv National University	2	20,000	31.07.14			Higher educational establishments of Ukraine	Kyiv National University
313	Nicholas Roerich	2	20,000	25.09.14			Outstanding Personalities of Ukraine	Nicholas Roerich
314	Cyclamen coum	2	35,000	30.09.14			Flora and fauna	Cyclamen coum
315	700 years of Ozbek Han Mosque	5	20,000	10.10.14			Architectural monuments of Ukraine	Ozbek Han Mosque
316	500 years of Battle of Orsha	5	30,000	15.10.14			Other coins	Battle of Orsha
317	70 years of the liberation of Ukraine from fascist invaders	5	30,000	21.10.14			World War II	70 years of the liberation of Ukraine from fascist invaders
318	Ostap Vyshnya	2	20,000	29.10.14			Outstanding Personalities of Ukraine	Ostap Vyshnya
319	75 years of Ternopil oblast	5	20,000	25.11.14			Regions of Ukraine	Ternopil oblast
320	75 years of Lviv oblast	5	20,000	25.11.14			Regions of Ukraine	Lviv oblast
321	Ivano-Frankivsk oblast	5	20,000	25.11.14			Regions of Ukraine	Ivano-Frankivsk oblast
322	75 years of Volyn oblast	5	20,000	25.11.14			Regions of Ukraine	Volyn oblast
323	75 years of Rivne oblast	5	20,000	25.11.14			Regions of Ukraine	Rivne oblast
324	Vasyl Lypkivsky	2	20,000	27.11.14			Outstanding Personalities of Ukraine	Vasyl Lypkivsky

=== 2015-2019 ===
№	Event/Collection	Value	Mintage number amount	Date of issue	Obverse	Reverse	Series	In honor of
325	Halshka Hulevychivna	2	30,000	27.01.15			Outstanding Personalities of Ukraine	Halshka Hulevychivna
326	Euromaidan	5	50,000	18.02.15			To the heroes of the Maidan	Euromaidan
327	Heavenly Hundred	5	50,000	18.02.15			To the heroes of the Maidan	Maidan casualties
328	Revolution of Dignity	5	50,000	18.02.15			To the heroes of the Maidan	Revolution of Dignity
329	Mykhailo Verbytskyi	2	30 000	04.03.15			Outstanding Personalities of Ukraine	Mykhailo Verbytskyi
330	Jacques Hnizdovsky	2	30 000	31.03.15			Outstanding Personalities of Ukraine	Jacques Hnizdovsky
331	120 years of the Kharkiv Zoo	2	35 000	15.04.15			Other coins	Kharkiv Zoo
332	150 years of Odesa National University named after I. I. Mechnikov	2	35 000	28.04.15			Higher educational establishments of Ukraine	Odesa University
333	70 years of Victory	5	35 000	05.05.15			World War II	Victory in World War II
334	Kyiv Funicular	5	35 000	27.05.15			Other coins	Kyiv Funicular
335	Petro Prokopovych	2	30 000	08.07.15			Outstanding Personalities of Ukraine	Petro Prokopovych
336	Andrey Sheptytsky	2	30 000	15.07.15			Outstanding Personalities of Ukraine	Andrey Sheptytsky
337	Cathedral of the Dormition, Volodymyr	5	35 000	22.07.15			Architectural monuments of Ukraine	Cathedral of the Dormition, Volodymyr
338	75 years of Chernivtsi Oblast	5	30 000	05.07.15			Regions of Ukraine	Chernivtsi Oblast
339	475 years since the first written mention of the city of Ternopil	5	35 000	20.07.15			Ancient cities of Ukraine	Ternopil
340	Oleksandr Murashko	2	30 000	02.09.15			Outstanding Personalities of Ukraine	Oleksandr Murashko
341	Ivan Karpenko-Karyi	2	30 000	14.09.15			Outstanding Personalities of Ukraine	Ivan Karpenko-Karyi
342	400 years of the National University of Kyiv-Mohyla Academy	2	35 000	15.09.15			Higher educational establishments of Ukraine	National University of Kyiv-Mohyla Academy
343	Pidhirtsi Castle	5	35 000	23.09.15			Architectural monuments of Ukraine	Pidhirtsi Castle
344	Oleshky Sands	2	35 000	23.09.15			Other coins	Oleshky Sands
345	Defenders Day	5	50 000	12.10.15			Ukraine’s Armed Forces	Defenders Day (Ukraine)
346	100 years of the National University of Water Management and Nature Management	2	25 000	29.10.15			Higher educational establishments of Ukraine	National University of Water Management and Nature Management
347	260 years of Kyiv Military Hospital	5	25 000	07.12.15			Other coins	National Army Hospital of Ukraine
348	Shchedryk	5	50 000	05.01.16			Ukrainian heritage	Shchedryk (song)
349	75 years of Zakarpattia Oblast	5	30 000	14.01.16			Regions of Ukraine	Zakarpattia Oblast
350	Sofia Rusova	2	25 000	18.02.16			Outstanding Personalities of Ukraine	Sofia Rusova
351	150 years of the National Parliamentary Library of Ukraine	5	30 000	24.02.16			Spiritual treasures of Ukraine	Yaroslav Mudryi National Library of Ukraine
352	Games of the XXXI Olympics in Rio de Janeiro	2	30 000	28.04.16			Sports	2016 Summer Olympics
353	In memory of the victims of the genocide of the Crimean Tatar people	5	30 000	12.05.16			Other coins	Deportation of the Crimean Tatars
354	Petrykivka painting	5	35 000	20.05.16			Ukrainian heritage	Petrykivka painting
355	Horse tram	5	35 000	25.05.16			Other coins	Horsecar
356	Struve Geodetic Arc	5	30 000	07.06.16			Other coins	Struve Geodetic Arc
357	Ivan Mykolaichuk	2	25 000	15.06.16			Outstanding Personalities of Ukraine	Ivan Mykolaichuk
358	20 years of the Constitution of Ukraine	2	30 000	20.06.16			Revival of Ukrainian statehood	Constitution of Ukraine
359	50 years of Ternopil National University of Economics	2	25 000	23.06.16			Higher educational establishments of Ukraine	West Ukrainian National University
360	Cypripedium calceolus	2	30 000	20.07.16			Flora and fauna	Cypripedium calceolus
361	Ancient Malyn	5	30 000	28.07.16			Ancient cities of Ukraine	Malyn
362	25 years of independence of Ukraine	5	50 000	17.08.16			Revival of Ukrainian statehood	Independence of Ukraine
363	Kievan Rus	5	50 000	17.08.16			Revival of Ukrainian statehood	Kievan Rus'
364	Cossack state	5	50 000	17.08.16			Revival of Ukrainian statehood	Cossack Hetmanate
365	Kingdom of Galicia–Volhynia	5	50 000	17.08.16			Revival of Ukrainian statehood	Kingdom of Galicia–Volhynia
366	Ancient Vyshhorod	5	30 000	30.08.16			Ancient cities of Ukraine	Vyshhorod
367	200 years of Kharkiv National Agrarian University named after V. V. Dokuchaev	2	30 000	01.09.16			Higher educational establishments of Ukraine	V. Dokuchaev Kharkiv National Agrarian University
368	100th anniversary of the battles of the Legion of Ukrainian Sich Riflemen on Mount Lysonya	5	30 000	02.09.16			Other coins	Ukrainian Sich Riflemen
369	Ukraine is a non-permanent member of the United Nations Security Council. 2016-2017	5	30 000	07.09.16			Other coins	United Nations Security Council
370	Mykhailo Hrushevsky	2	25 000	26.09.16			Outstanding Personalities of Ukraine	Mykhailo Hrushevsky
371	70 years of the Kyiv National University of Trade and Economics	2	30 000	30.09.16			Higher educational establishments of Ukraine	Kyiv National University of Trade and Economics
372	100 years of the fire engine of Ukraine	5	40 000	03.10.16			Other coins	Fire engine
373	Ukraine begins with you	5	50 000	12.10.16			Other coins	Civil volunteer movement helping Ukrainian forces in the war in Donbas
374	Until the day of St. Nicholas	5	75 000	12.12.16			Other coins	Saint Nicholas Day
375	200 years of the Lviv University of Trade and Economics	2	30 000	12.12.16			Higher educational establishments of Ukraine	Lviv University of Trade and Economics
376	St. Nicholas Roman Catholic Church	5	30 000	19.12.16			Architectural monuments of Ukraine	St. Nicholas Roman Catholic Church, Kyiv
377	Bohdan Stupka	2	25 000	19.12.16			Outstanding Personalities of Ukraine	Bohdan Stupka
378	Ancient Drohobych	5	30 000	22.12.16			Ancient cities of Ukraine	Drohobych
379	Tetyana Yablonska	2	25 000	21.02.17			Outstanding Personalities of Ukraine	Tetyana Yablonska
380	To the 100th anniversary of the Ukrainian Revolution of 1917-1921	5	35 000	22.03.17			Revival of Ukrainian statehood	Ukrainian War of Independence
381	Mykola Kostomarov	2	25 000	20.04.17			Outstanding Personalities of Ukraine	Mykola Kostomarov
382	Eurovision Song Contest 2017	5	40 000	11.05.17			Other coins	Eurovision Song Contest 2017
383	200 years of K. D. Ushinsky South Ukrainian National Pedagogical University	2	30 000	11.05.17			Higher educational establishments of Ukraine	K. D. Ushinsky South Ukrainian National Pedagogical University
384	The old castle in Kamianets-Podilskyi	5	40 000	17.05.17			Architectural monuments of Ukraine	Kamianets-Podilskyi Castle
385	125 years of tram traffic in Kyiv	5	40 000	25.05.17			Other coins	Tram in Kyiv
386	Marbled polecat	2	40 000	01.06.17			Flora and fauna	Marbled polecat
387	Josyf Slipyj	2	35 000	20.06.17			Outstanding Personalities of Ukraine	Josyf Slipyj
388	400 years of the Lutsk Khrestovozdvizhensky brotherhood	5	30 000	20.06.17			Other coins	The Lutsk brotherhood of the Honest Cross
389	Ivan Aivazovsky	2	35 000	11.07.17			Outstanding Personalities of Ukraine	Ivan Aivazovsky
390	Mykhailo Petrenko	2	35 000	11.07.17			Outstanding Personalities of Ukraine	Mykhailo Petrenko
391	80 years of Kyiv Oblast	5	35 000	25.07.17			Regions of Ukraine	Kyiv Oblast
392	Kosiv painting	5	40 000	15.08.17			Ukrainian heritage	Kosiv painted ceramics
393	Ancient Halych	5	40 000	22.08.17			Ancient cities of Ukraine	Halych
394	80 years of Vinnytsia region	5	35 000	22.08.17			Regions of Ukraine	Vinnytsia Oblast
395	60th of the launch of the first Earth satellite	5	50 000	29.08.17			Ukraine in space	Sputnik 1
396	Vasyl Remeslo	2	30 000	04.09.17			Outstanding Personalities of Ukraine	Vasyl Remeslo
397	80 years of Reformation	5	40 000	15.09.17			Other coins	Reformation
398	Catherine's Church, Chernihiv	5	40 000	18.09.17			Architectural monuments of Ukraine	Catherine's Church, Chernihiv
399	80 years of Khmelnytskyi Oblast	5	35 000	10.10.17			Regions of Ukraine	Khmelnytskyi Oblast
400	80 years of Poltava Oblast	5	35 000	10.10.17			Regions of Ukraine	Poltava Oblast
401	100 years of Kherson State University	2	30 000	24.10.17			Higher educational establishments of Ukraine	Kherson State University
402	100 years of the National Academic Ukrainian Drama Theater named after Maria Zankovetska	5	35 000	24.10.17			Other coins	Maria Zankovetska Theatre
403	150 years of the National Academic Opera and Ballet Theater of Ukraine named after T. G. Shevchenko	5	40 000	27.10.17			Spiritual treasures of Ukraine	National Opera of Ukraine
404	Alexander Archipenko	2	30 000	09.11.17			Outstanding Personalities of Ukraine	Alexander Archipenko
405	100th anniversary of the first Qurultay of the Crimean Tatar People	5	35 000	17.11.17			Other coins	Qurultay of the Crimean Tatar People
406	XV Summer Paralympic Games in Rio de Janeiro	2	35 000	21.11.17			Sports	2016 Summer Paralympics
407	100 years since the formation of the Bohdan Khmelnytsky First Ukrainian Regiment and the beginning of the formation of the Ukrainian Armed Forces (coin)	5	50 000	23.11.17			Ukraine’s Armed Forces	Bohdan Khmelnytsky First Ukrainian Regiment
408	80 years of Chernihiv Oblast	5	35 000	28.11.17			Regions of Ukraine	Chernihiv Oblast
409	80 years of Odesa Oblast	5	35 000	28.11.17			Regions of Ukraine	Odesa Oblast
410	100 years of National Academy of Visual Arts and Architecture	2	35 000	07.12.17			Higher educational establishments of Ukraine	National Academy of Visual Arts and Architecture
411	80 years of Kharkiv Oblast	5	35 000	12.12.17			Regions of Ukraine	Kharkiv Oblast
412	80 years of Dnipropetrovsk Oblast	5	35 000	12.12.17			Regions of Ukraine	Dnipropetrovsk Oblast
413	80 years of Ukrainian World Congress	5	35 000	26.12.17			Other coins	Ukrainian World Congress
414	80 years of Donetsk Oblast	5	35 000	26.12.17			Regions of Ukraine	Donetsk Oblast
415	XXIII Winter Olympic Games	2	40 000	10.01.18			Sports	2018 Winter Olympics
416	Alexander Shalimov	2	35 000	23.01.18			Outstanding Personalities of Ukraine	Alexander Shalimov
417	Leonid Zhabotinsky	2	35 000	23.01.18			Outstanding Personalities of Ukraine	Leonid Zhabotinsky
418	Defenders of Donetsk airport	10	1000 000	30.01.18			Ukraine’s Armed Forces	Cyborgs (Donetsk airport)
419	Liubomyr Huzar	2	45 000	15.02.18			Outstanding Personalities of Ukraine	Liubomyr Huzar
420	Ukrainian Volunteer Day	10	1000 000	12.03.18			Ukraine’s Armed Forces	Ukrainian Volunteer Day
421	100 years of Ukrainian Red Cross Society	5	40 000	29.03.18			Other coins	Ukrainian Red Cross Society
422	An-132	5	40 000	11.04.18			Aircraft of Ukraine	Antonov/Taqnia An-132
423	100 years of Navy of the Ukrainian People's Republic	10	1000 000	18.04.18			Ukraine’s Armed Forces	Navy of the Ukrainian People's Republic
424	Autonomous Republic of Crimea	5	45 000	25.04.18			Regions of Ukraine	Autonomous Republic of Crimea
425	Dnieper barbel	2	40 000	05.06.18			Flora and fauna	Dnieper barbel
426	100 years of Kamyanets-Podilsky Ivan Ohienko National University	2	30 000	20.06.18			Higher educational establishments of Ukraine	Kamyanets-Podilsky Ivan Ohienko National University
427	100 years of Oles Honchar Dnipro National University	2	30 000	25.07.18			Higher educational establishments of Ukraine	Oles Honchar Dnipro National University
428	Valentin Glushko	2	35 000	25.07.18			Outstanding Personalities of Ukraine	Valentin Glushko
429	100 years of Tavrida National V.I. Vernadsky University	2	30 000	28.08.18			Higher educational establishments of Ukraine	Tavrida National V.I. Vernadsky University
430	Olga Avilova	2	35 000	03.09.18			Outstanding Personalities of Ukraine	Olga Avilova
431	I give my heart to children	2	35 000	03.09.18			Outstanding Personalities of Ukraine	Vasyl Sukhomlynsky
432	100th of the issue of the first postage stamps of Ukraine	5	45 000	25.09.18			Other coins	Stamps of the Ukrainian People's Republic
433	100 years of P.L. Shupyk National Medical Academy of Postgraduate Education	2	30 000	01.10.18			Higher educational establishments of Ukraine	P.L. Shupyk National Medical Academy of Postgraduate Education
434	100 years of National Academy of Sciences of Ukraine	5	40 000	10.10.18			Other coins	National Academy of Sciences of Ukraine
435	XII Winter Paralympic Games	2	35 000	18.10.18			Sports	2018 Winter Paralympics
436	100 years of Kobzar choir	5	40 000	18.10.18			Other coins	Kobzar
437	Ivan Nechuy-Levytsky	2	35 000	06.11.18			Outstanding Personalities of Ukraine	Ivan Nechuy-Levytsky
438	Medzhybizh Fortress	5	40 000	27.11.18			Architectural monuments of Ukraine	Medzhybizh Fortress
439	Oleksiy Kolomiychenko	2	30 000	05.12.18			Outstanding Personalities of Ukraine	Oleksiy Kolomiychenko
440	To the New Year holidays	5	50 000	17.12.18			Other coins	New Year, Christmas in Ukraine
441	Kiyv	5	45 000	20.12.18			Regions of Ukraine	Kiyv
442	Sevastopol	5	45 000	26.12.18			Regions of Ukraine	Sevastopol
443	Bogdan Khanenko	2	35 000	17.01.19			Outstanding Personalities of Ukraine	Bogdan Khanenko
444	100 years of the Unification Act — the unity of Ukrainian lands	5	40 000	17.01.19			Revival of Ukrainian statehood	Unification Act
445	Palanok Castle	5	40 000	26.02.19			Architectural monuments of Ukraine	Palanok Castle
446	Provision of the Tomos of autocephaly of the Orthodox Church of Ukraine	5	75 000	25.03.19			Spiritual treasures of Ukraine	Tomos of autocephaly of the Orthodox Church of Ukraine
447	Kholodnyi Yar	5	40 000	15.04.19			Other coins	Kholodnyi Yar, Kholodny Yar Republic
448	Panas Saksahansky	2	35 000	14.05.19			Outstanding Personalities of Ukraine	Panas Saksahansky
449	100 years of Odesa Film Studio	5	40 000	14.05.19			Other coins	Odesa Film Studio
450	Mhar Transfiguration monastery	5	40 000	21.05.19			Architectural monuments of Ukraine	Mhar Monastery
451	Aleksei Pogorelov	2	35 000	03.06.19			Outstanding Personalities of Ukraine	Aleksei Pogorelov
452	White-tailed eagle	2	45 000	10.07.19			Flora and fauna	White-tailed eagle
453	Panteleimon Kulish	2	35 000	22.07.19			Outstanding Personalities of Ukraine	Panteleimon Kulish
454	175 years of Lviv National Music Academy	2	30 000	05.09.19			Higher educational establishments of Ukraine	Lviv National Music Academy
455	The first launch of the Zenit-3SL launch vehicle	5	40 000	19.09.19			Ukraine in space	Zenit-3SL
456	Ivan Trush	2	35 000	09.10.19			Outstanding Personalities of Ukraine	Ivan Trush
457	75 years of the liberation of Ukraine	5	40 000	22.10.19			World War II	75 years of the liberation of Ukraine
458	Kazimir Malevich	2	35 000	05.11.19			Outstanding Personalities of Ukraine	Kazimir Malevich
459	75 years of National Honored Academic Chapel of Ukraine "Dumka"	5	40 000	05.11.19			Other coins	National Honored Academic Chapel of Ukraine "Dumka"
460	Mykola Lukash	2	35 000	17.12.19			Outstanding Personalities of Ukraine	Mykola Lukash
461	To the participants of hostilities on the territory of other states	10	1000 000	26.12.19			Ukraine’s Armed Forces	Participants of peacekeeping missions
462	On guard of life	10	1000 000	26.12.19			Ukraine’s Armed Forces	Military medicine
463	KrAZ-6322 "Soldier"	10	1000 000	26.12.19			Ukraine’s Armed Forces	KrAZ-6322

=== 2020-2024 ===
№	Event/Collection	Value	Mintage number amount	Date of issue	Obverse	Reverse	Series	In honor of
464	100 Years since the Establishment of the Mykola Sumtsov Kharkiv Historical Museum	5	35 000	16.01.20			Spiritual treasures of Ukraine	M. F. Sumtsov Kharkiv Historical Museum
465	100 Years since the Establishment of the Ivan Franko National Academic Drama Theater	5	35 000	23.01.20			Spiritual treasures of Ukraine	Ivan Franko National Academic Drama Theater
466	The Year of the Rat	5	50 000	27.01.20			Eastern calendar	Year of the Rat
467	Zolochiv Castle	5	40 000	19.02.20			Architectural monuments of Ukraine	Zolochiv Castle
468	St. Michael’s Vydubychi Monastery	5	40 000	16.04.20			Architectural monuments of Ukraine	Vydubychi Monastery
469	The 75th Anniversary of the Victory over Nazism in the Second World War of 1939–1945	5	40 000	05.05.20			World War II	Victory over Nazism in the ІІ World War
470	The Malachite Moth	2	40 000	02.06.20			Flora and fauna	Staurophora celsia
471	The ХХXІІ Olympic Games	2	35 000	22.07.20			Sports	2020 Summer Olympics
472	The Ancient Town of Dubno	5	35 000	28.07.20			Ancient cities of Ukraine	Dubno
473	The Air Force of Ukraine’s Armed Forces	10	1000 000	03.08.20			Ukraine’s Armed Forces	Ukrainian Air Force
474	Memorial Day of Fallen Defenders of Ukraine	10	1000 000	26.08.20			Ukraine’s Armed Forces	Defenders of Ukraine
475	700 years of the first written mention of Lohvytsia	5	35 000	27.08.20			Ancient cities of Ukraine	Lokhvytsia
476	700 years of Nizhyn Gogol State University	2	30 000	01.09.20			Higher educational establishments of Ukraine	Nizhyn Gogol State University
477	Vladimir Peretz	2	30 000	15.09.20			Outstanding Personalities of Ukraine	Vladimir Peretz
478	The Glorious City of Zaporizhzhia	5	35 000	29.09.20			Ancient cities of Ukraine	Zaporizhzhia
479	Amet-khan Sultan	2	30 000	07.10.20			Outstanding Personalities of Ukraine	Amet-khan Sultan
480	Передова	5	45 000	12.10.20			Other coins	To doctors who fought with the COVID-19 pandemic in Ukraine and Ukrainian soldiers who fought against Russia
481	Andriy Romodanov	2	30 000	02.11.20			Outstanding Personalities of Ukraine	Andriy Romodanov
482	State Border Guard Service of Ukraine	10	1000 000	19.11.20			Ukraine’s Armed Forces	State Border Guard Service of Ukraine
483	175 years since the Brotherhood of Saints Cyril and Methodius was founded	5	30 000	26.11.20			Other coins	Brotherhood of Saints Cyril and Methodius
484	Sloviansk	5	35 000	01.12.20			Ancient cities of Ukraine	Sloviansk
485	Vladimir Koretsky	2	30 000	10.12.20			Outstanding Personalities of Ukraine	Vladimir Koretsky
486	Year of the Ox	5	50 000	10.12.20			Eastern calendar	Ox (zodiac)
487	Ahatanhel Krymsky	2	35 000	12.01.21			Outstanding Personalities of Ukraine	Ahatanhel Krymsky
488	250 years of the Astronomical Observatory of Lviv University	5	35 000	10.02.21			Other coins	Astronomical Observatory of Lviv University
489	200 years of the Mykolaiv Astronomical Observatory	5	35 000	10.02.21			Other coins	Mykolaiv Observatory
490	Reshetylivka Carpet Weaving	5	25 000	15.04.21			Ukrainian heritage	Reshetylivka Carpet Weaving
491	Vasyl Stefanyk	2	35 000	12.05.21			Outstanding Personalities of Ukraine	Vasyl Stefanyk
492	Kyiv Fortress	5	40 000	14.05.21			Architectural monuments of Ukraine	Kyiv Fortress
493	100 years of the National Academy of Internal Affairs	2	30 000	18.05.21			Higher educational establishments of Ukraine	National Academy of Internal Affairs
494	Yevhen Konovalets	2	35 000	09.06.21			Outstanding Personalities of Ukraine	Yevhen Konovalets
495	Vasyl Slipak	2	35 000	21.06.21			Outstanding Personalities of Ukraine	Vasyl Slipak
496	Lighthouses in Ukraine	5	35 000	22.07.21			Other coins	List of lighthouses in Ukraine
497	Chernobyl. Renaissance. Przewalski's horse	5	40 000	29.07.21			Flora and fauna	Chernobyl. Przewalski's horse
498	30th anniversary of Ukraine's independence	5	50 000	10.08.21			Revival of Ukrainian statehood	Ukraine's independence
499	Ukrainian rescuers	5	40 000	15.09.21			Other coins	Ukrainian rescuers
500	80th anniversary of the tragedy in Babiny Yar	5	40 000	27.09.21			Other coins	Babi Yar
501	Ivan Poddubny	2	35 000	05.10.21			Outstanding Personalities of Ukraine	Ivan Poddubny
502	Dmitry Bortniansky	2	35 000	19.10.21			Outstanding Personalities of Ukraine	Dmitry Bortniansky
503	Battle of Khotyn	5	35 000	29.10.21			Heroes of the Cossack era	Battle of Khotyn (1621)
504	Десантно-штурмові війська Збройних Сил України	10	1000 000	11.11.21			Ukraine’s Armed Forces	Ukrainian Air Assault Forces
505	Garrison Church of the Holy Apostles Peter and Paul (Lviv)	5	35 000	01.12.21			Architectural monuments of Ukraine	Saints Peter and Paul Garrison Church (Lviv)
506	Ukrainian Ground Forces	10	1000 000	01.12.21			Ukraine’s Armed Forces	Ukrainian Ground Forces
507	Armed Forces of Ukraine	10	1000 000	01.12.21			Ukraine’s Armed Forces	Armed Forces of Ukraine
508	Year of the Tiger	5	50 000	09.12.21			Eastern calendar	Tiger (zodiac)
509	XXIV Winter Olympic Games	2	35 000	18.01.22			Sports	2022 Winter Olympics
510	In unity strength	5	75 000	11.07.22			My Immortal Ukraine	Unity of Ukrainians against Russian invasion of Ukraine
511	Ukrainian Navy	10	1000 000	14.07.22			Ukraine’s Armed Forces	Ukrainian Navy
512	Oi u luzi chervona kalyna	5	125 000	18.07.22			My Immortal Ukraine	Oi u luzi chervona kalyna
513	Special Operations Forces of Ukraine	10	1000 000	22.07.22			Ukraine’s Armed Forces	Special Operations Forces of Ukraine
514	Elizaveta Yaroslavna	2	35 000	28.07.22			Outstanding Personalities of Ukraine	Elisiv of Kiev
515	Chernobyl. Renaissance. Brown bear	5	40 000	29.07.22			Flora and fauna	Chernobyl. Brown bear
516	State Service of Special Communications and Information Protection of Ukraine	5	20 000	09.08.22			Other coins	State Special Communications Service of Ukraine
517	St Volodymyr's Cathedral (Kiyv)	5	35 000	15.09.22			Architectural monuments of Ukraine	St Volodymyr's Cathedral
518	Solomiya Krushelnytska	2	30 000	19.10.22			Outstanding Personalities of Ukraine	Solomiya Krushelnytska
519	Granting the status of a candidate country for EU membership	5	50 000	18.11.22			Other coins	Ukraine–European Union relations
520	Ukraine’s Coat of arms	5	100 000	29.11.22			The Ukrainian State	Coat of Arms of Ukraine
521	Ukraine’s Flag	5	100 000	29.11.22			The Ukrainian State	Flag of Ukraine
522	Ukraine’s Anthem	5	100 000	29.11.22			The Ukrainian State	National anthem of Ukraine
523	The Year of the Rabbit (Cat)	5	80 000	01.12.22			Eastern calendar	Cat (zodiac)
524	100 Years Since the Establishment of Beketov National University of the Urban Economy in Kharkiv	2	25 000	01.12.22			Higher educational establishments of Ukraine	Kharkiv National Academy of Urban Economy
525	Pavlo Hlazovyi	2	30 000	28.12.22			Outstanding Personalities of Ukraine	Pavlo Hlazovyi
526	Vasyl Krychevskyi	2	30 000	24.01.23			Outstanding Personalities of Ukraine	Vasyl Krychevsky
527	Chornobyl. Revival. The Eurasian Lynx	5	40 000	26.04.23			Flora and fauna	Chernobyl. Eurasian lynx
528	Pavlo Skoropadskyi	2	30 000	30.05.23			Outstanding Personalities of Ukraine	Pavlo Skoropadskyi
529	Born in Ukraine	5	75 000	01.06.23			My Immortal Ukraine	Ukrainians born in Ukraine
530	The Courage To Be. UA	5	75 000	23.08.23			My Immortal Ukraine	To the courage of the Ukrainian nation
531	Ukraine’s Military Intelligence	5	50 000	05.09.23			Other coins	Main Directorate of Intelligence (Ukraine)
532	The Country of Superheroes. We Thank Our Energy Workers!	5	50 000	26.09.23			My Immortal Ukraine	Ukrainian power engineers
533	100 Years since the Establishment of the National Scientific Center – Hon. Prof. M. S. Bokarius Forensic Science Institute	5	30 000	28.09.23			Other coins	National Scientific Center "Institute of Forensic Examinations named after Ex. Prof. M. S. Bokarius"
534	Ukrainian Borshch	5	75 000	29.09.23			Ukrainian heritage	Borscht
535	Female Defenders	5	50 000	02.10.23			My Immortal Ukraine	Women Defenders of Ukraine
536	The Year of the Dragon	5	80 000	24.11.23			Eastern calendar	Dragon (zodiac)
537	The Ukrainian Language	5	75 000	29.11.23			Spiritual treasures of Ukraine	Ukrainian language
538	The Country of Superheroes. We Thank Our Volunteers!	5	50 000	04.12.23			My Immortal Ukraine	Ukrainian volunteers
539	The Country of Superheroes. We Thank Our Railway Workers!	5	50 000	14.12.23			My Immortal Ukraine	Ukrainian rail transport workers
540	Ukraine’s State Security Administration	5	50 000	29.01.24			Other coins	State Security Administration (Ukraine)
541	Love	5	50 000	14.02.24			Other coins	Love
542	Parental Happiness	5	100 000	March 1, 2024			Other coins	Parental happiness
543	Ukrainian “Bavovna.” The Neptune	5	75 000	12.04.24			Ukraine’s Armed Forces	R-360 Neptune
544	Chornobyl. Revival. The Black Stork	5	40 000	26.04.24			Flora and fauna	Black stork
545	Europe Day	5	50 000	09.05.2024			Other coins	Europe Day
546	Ornek. A Crimean Tatar Ornament	5	75 000	23.05.24			Ukrainian heritage	Örnek (ornament)
547	A Drop of Life	5	75 000	14.06.24			Other coins	Blood donation
548	The Light of Goodness and Love (Olena Pchilka 1849 – 1930)	2	30 000	28.06.24			Outstanding Personalities of Ukraine	Olena Pchilka
549	Ukrainian “Bavovna.” The Leleka-100	5	75 000	22.07.24			Ukraine’s Armed Forces	Leleka-100
550	The Country of Superheroes. We Thank Our Medical Workers!	5	50 000	26.07.24			My Immortal Ukraine	Health professional

== Series of coins ==
- 2000 Years of Christmas
- Ancient monuments of Ukraine
- Airplanes of Ukraine
- Ancient cities of Ukraine
- Architectural monuments of Ukraine
- Ukraine’s Armed Forces
- On the edge of Millenniums
- Children's Zodiac
- Eastern calendar
- Fauna in cultural monuments of Ukraine
- Famous families of Ukraine
- Flora and fauna
- Folk crafts of Ukraine
- Folk Musical Instruments
- Heroes of Cossack Age
- Hero-cities of Ukraine
- Hetmans' capital cities
- Higher educational establishments of Ukraine
- Maritime history of Ukraine
- Monuments of ancient cultures of Ukraine
- My Immortal Ukraine
- Oblasts of Ukraine
- Outstanding Personalities of Ukraine
- Other coins
- Points of interest of ancient cultures of Ukraine
- Princes of Ukraine
- Rebirth of Christian spirituality in Ukraine
- Rebirth of Ukrainian statehood
- Ritual Festivals of Ukraine
- Spiritual Treasures of Ukraine
- Sports
- The Smallest Golden Coin
- To the heroes of the Maidan
- Cosmic Ukraine
- Ukrainian heritage
- Ukrainian state
- World War II
- Signs of the zodiac
