= Phlegmasia =

Phlegmasia may refer to:

- Inflammation
- Either of the following conditions:

- Phlegmasia cerulea dolens, an uncommon severe form of deep venous thrombosis.
- Phlegmasia alba dolens, resulting in a white appearance of the leg.
