= Borys Hmyria =

Soviet-Ukrainian singer (1903–1969)

Borys Romanovych Hmyria
- Борис Романович Гмиря
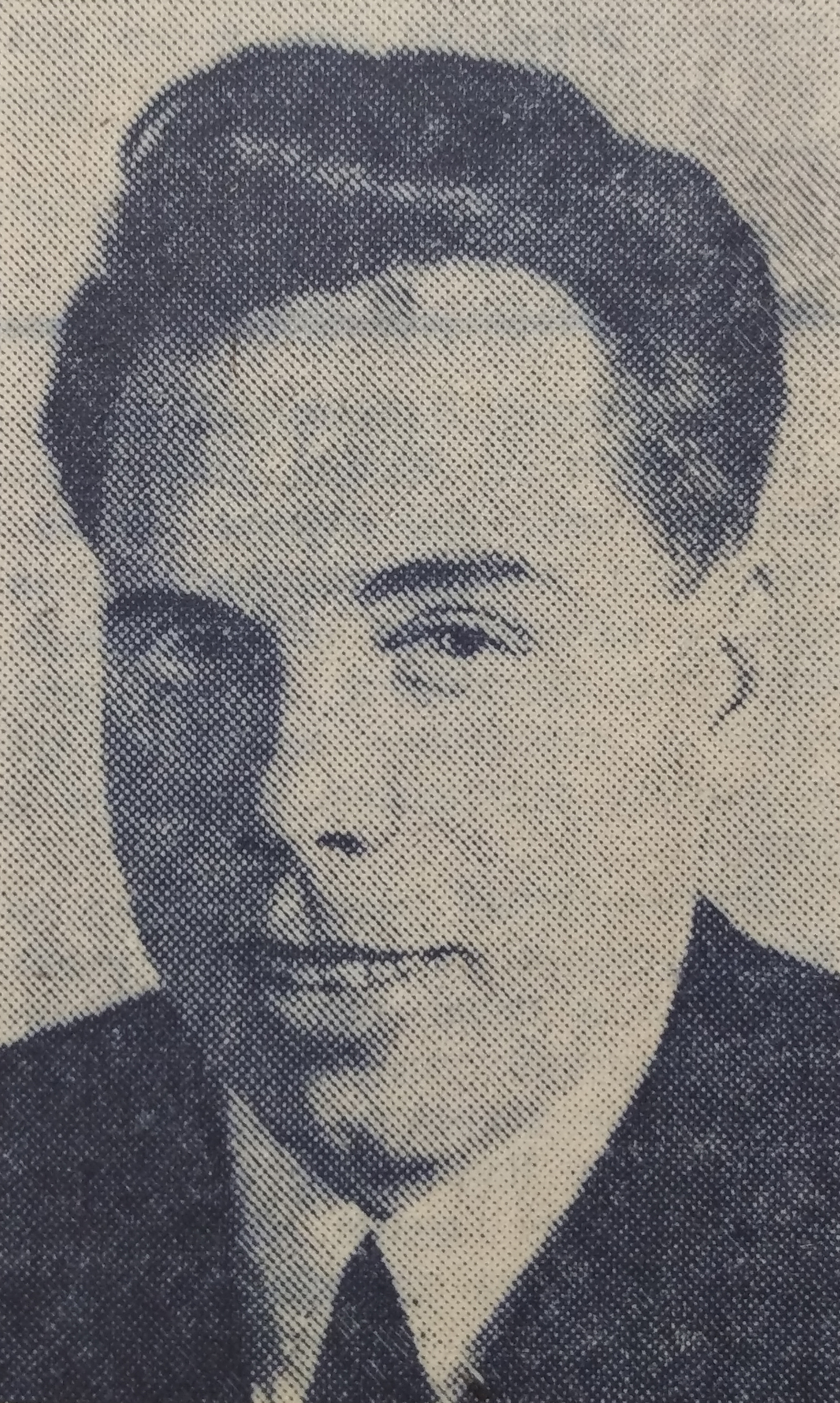
- Hmyria in 1939
- Born: August 5, 1903; Lebedin, Kharkov Governorate, Russian Empire (present-day Ukraine)
- Died: August 1, 1969 (aged 65); Kiev, Ukrainian SSR, Soviet Union (present-day Kyiv, Ukraine)
- Occupation: Singer
- Awards: Order of Lenin (1960)

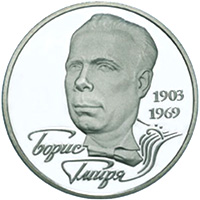
A ₴2 commemorative coin issued in 2003

Borys Romanovych Hmyria (Note: Ukrainian: Борис Романович Гмиря, romanized: Borys Romanovych Hmyria; Russian: Борис Романович Гмыря, romanized: Boris Romanovich Gmyrya) (5 August [O.S. 23 July] 1903 – August 1, 1969) PAU, was a Ukrainian and Soviet bass singer of opera and art song. He was known for his vocal range and performance style through his combination of the qualities of a basso cantante and basso profondo, enabling him to perform multiple roles in performance.

Hmyria first achieved national prominence in the late 1930s after winning second place at the All‑Union Vocalists’ Competition, and subsequently became a leading soloist of the Kyiv Opera. During World War II, Hmyria remained in German-occupied Ukraine due to health issues which prevented him from evacuating, and performed under local theatre administrations. He later refused to evacuate with the Germans, which led Soviet authorities to view him as a collaborator, and he narrowly avoided imprisonment. Despite this controversy, he returned to the Kyiv Opera, where he performed for nearly two decades afterward. During his career, he received the titles of People's Artist of the USSR, the Stalin Prize, and Order of Lenin.

== Early life and education ==
Hmyria was born in 1903 in Lebedin, Kharkov Governorate, Russian Empire (today part of Ukraine). In 1930, he started attending the Kharkiv National University of Civil Engineering and Architecture, where he first started singing for fellow students during breaks. Pavlo Holubiev, of the Kharkiv Conservatory, who was initially unimpressed by Hmyria, eventually started trying to help him due to his manner of speaking. He was allowed to simultaneously, by special dispensation of the People's Commissar of Education, attend the Kharkiv Conservatory and the university, and graduated from the former in two years. At the same time, he was part of the Kharkiv Opera from 1936 up until 1939, when he left Kharkiv to join the Kiev Opera. He first garnered national attention that year when he won second at the All-Union Vocalists' Competition (there was no first place), and was offered to move to Moscow, Leningrad, or Minsk to perform in the city's operas but turned them down to stay in Ukraine.

== World War II ==
On 21 June 1941, the day before Operation Barbarossa, he flew to Crimea for a holiday vacation. Upon the war breaking out, he tried to return to Kiev, but was diverted to Kharkiv. He attempted to leave Ukraine in October 1941 via Tbilisi, but he tore the ligaments of his spine and was hospitalized and unable to leave the area. He stayed in Kharkiv during the winter of 1941-42, before being sent to Poltava by the order of the Germans to work in the city's theatre under German overseer Siegfried Wolfer. In spring 1943, a group from Berlin came to the theatre in Poltava to record him singing "Ey, Ukhnem", and he was invited to move to Berlin. He refused, citing his wife's illnesses. Upon the German retreat in early 1943, he refused orders to evacuate westward with the Germans and was evicted from his apartment. However, his staying in Poltava and not evacuating was considered collaboration with the enemy by Soviet authorities. Hmyria would have been imprisoned and executed had it not been for Joseph Stalin's intervention. Hmyria's partner, Valentina Ishchenko, was exiled to Vorkuta in the Komi ASSR.

== Later career ==
Following the war, Hmyria performed at the Kiev Opera Theatre until a dispute with the conductor over his use of tempo rubato (or slightly speeding up or slowing down the rhythm of a track rather than keeping to the beat). He considered rubato a core creative principle in his works, but his dispute with the conductor escalated into a public accusation that he was lowering the quality of productions for the theatre. The theatre management declined to intervene in the dispute, so Hmyria proposed his own transfer to pension status and to only appear at the theatre as a guest artist.

He died in Kiev in 1969. Following his death, the Melodiya label distributed his pressings worldwide.

== Style ==
Hmyria was considered both a basso cantante and a basso profondo, which was rare. his range allowed him to sing bass, baritone, and some tenor roles simultaneously. This was best seen in his performances of Taras Bulba, where he sang both the bass role of Taras and the tenor role of Andriy.

== Friendship with Shostakovich ==
Hmyria was a friend of Dmitri Shostakovich and often performed his Five Romances on Verses by Yevgeny Dolmatovsky in concert, although their friendship came under strain because of mutual perceived slights and their contrasting personalities.

During the summer of 1962, Shostakovich was completing his Thirteenth Symphony; the bass soloist part had been composed with Hmyria's voice in mind. The singer was reluctant to commit accepting the responsibility of singing the premiere performance, despite the composer's repeated urging. On August 15, Hmyria declined the assignment citing his objections to Yevtushenko's verses, but attended the premiere performance on December 18. After the concert, Hmyria wrote: "This evening I listened to Shostakovich's Thirteenth Symphony. My greatest impressions: 'Babi Yar,' 'In the Shop.'"

== Awards and legacy ==
In 1951, he was awarded with the title of People's Artist of the USSR, and in the following year he also got the Stalin Prize. Nearly a decade later, in 1960, he was awarded the Order of Lenin.

In 1973, a memorial plaque was unveiled outside of his house at 15 Khreshchatyk in Kyiv, where he lived from 1951 to 1969 which was sculpted by Ivan Kavaleridze. The house there has since been turned into a memorial museum. There is also an international foundation named after him, a section at the House of Culture in Lebedin in his honour, and since 2004 Kyiv has hosted the International Singers Competition named after Hmyria. In 2003, on the centenary of his birth, UNESCO in a statement described Hmyria as "Borys the Great", and declared his bass voice unique and his vocal legacy invaluable. However, he has generally remained unknown in Ukraine, and as of 2018, there is no monument or publicly accessible museum dedicated to him. The Hmyria Foundation, which is run by his heirs, has worked to digitize his recordings of nearly 3,000 works since then.
