= Phlegmasia alba dolens =

- Specialty: Vascular and Endovascular Surgery

Phlegmasia alba dolens (also colloquially known as milk leg or white leg; not to be confused with phlegmasia cerulea dolens) is part of a spectrum of diseases related to deep vein thrombosis. Historically, it was commonly seen during pregnancy and in mothers who have just given birth. In cases of pregnancy, it is most often seen during the third trimester, resulting from a compression of the left common iliac vein against the pelvic rim by the enlarged uterus. Today, this disease is most commonly (40% of the time) related to some form of underlying malignancy. Hypercoagulability (a propensity to clot formation) is a well-known state that occurs in many cancer states. The incidence of this disease is not well reported.

== Cause ==
The disease presumably begins with a deep vein thrombosis that progresses to total occlusion of the deep venous system. It is at this stage that it is called phlegmasia alba dolens. It is a sudden (acute) process. The leg, then, must rely on the superficial venous system for drainage. The superficial system is not adequate to handle the large volume of blood being delivered to the leg via the arterial system. The result is edema, pain and a white appearance (alba) of the leg.

The next step in the disease progression is occlusion of the superficial venous system, thereby preventing all venous outflow from the extremity. At this stage it is called phlegmasia cerulea dolens. The leg becomes more swollen and increasingly more painful. Additionally, the edema and loss of venous outflow impedes the arterial inflow. Ischemia with progression to gangrene are potential consequences. Phlegmasia alba dolens is distinguished, clinically, from phlegmasia cerulea dolens in that there is no ischemia and congestion. In severe cases of venous obstruction the arterial pulse may gradually disappear and venous gangrene may ensue.

== Diagnosis ==
The condition can be identified clinically & as early as possible to prevent further deterioration & complications like embolism, ischaemic necrosis, and gangrene. The diagnosis is confirmed with Doppler ultrasound of the veins of the affected leg, and occasionally other imaging modalities.

== Treatment ==
The mainstay of the treatment of deep vein thrombosis is with anticoagulation, but in very large DVTs various other modalities may be used to reduce the risk of complications. This may be surgical thrombectomy or catheter-directed thrombolysis.

== Etymology ==
Phlegmasia alba dolens literally means "painful white edema". It received the name "milk leg" because it was once thought to be caused by the metastasis of milk.
