= Gustavo S. Oderich =

American physician

- Born: Brazil
- Citizenship: Brazilian
- Education: MD Universidade Federal do Rio Grande do Sul General Surgery, Mayo Clinic (1999-2004) Vascular and Endovascular Surgery (2004-2006) Advanced Endovascular Aortic Therapy, Cleveland Clinic (2007)
- Medical career
- Profession: vascular surgeon
- Institutions: Baylor College of Medicine and Texas Heart Institute (2025-present), The University of Texas Health science center at Houston (2020-2025), Mayo Clinic (1999-2020)
- Sub-specialties: vascular and endovascular surgeon
- Research: fenestrated and branched stent-graft technology

Gustavo S. Oderich is a Brazilian American vascular and endovascular surgeon who serves as the Michael E. DeBakey Distinguished Chair in Surgery, professor of surgery and chief of the Division of Vascular Surgery and Endovascular Therapy at Baylor College of Medicine. Oderich is recognized for his work in minimally invasive endovascular surgery and research in stent-graft.

== Education ==
Originally from Brazil, Oderich received his medical degree, followed by a surgical residency at the Federal University of Rio Grande do Sul in 1990 to 1997 in Porto Alegre, Brazil. He completed a vascular surgery research fellowship at the University of Utah School of Medicine in 1998, then continued his clinical residency training in general surgery at the Mayo Clinic from 1999 to 2004. Upon completing his residency program, he trained in a vascular surgery fellowship, also at the Mayo Clinic from 2005 to 2006, followed by an extended fellowship in advanced endovascular repair at the Cleveland Clinic Foundation in 2007.

== Early career ==
The aorta is Oderich's study. From 2007 to 2020, Oderich held an executive position with the Vascular and Endovascular Surgery and was director of the Mayo Clinic Aortic Center.

== Research ==
Oderich worked for Cook Group Zenith Plus. He is a nominated surgeon in the US. Oderich is also specialized and involved in the Gore TAMBE. Oderich also provided his research and expertise in physician-modified endovascular grafts. Oderich is also the editor of the “Endovascular Aortic Repair: Current Techniques of fenestrated, branched and parallel grafts". Oderich is an associate editor for the Annals of Vascular Surgery and of the Journal of Cardiovascular Surgery. Oderich was a lecturer at global post-secondary institutes.

== Selected publications ==
- Factor, David; Oderich, Gustavo S. (2017). Endovascular aortic repair : current techniques with fenestrated, branched and parallel stent-grafts. Cham. ISBN 978-3-319-15192-2. OCLC 976433887.
- Oderich, Gustavo S. (2014). Mesenteric vascular disease : current therapy. New York. ISBN 978-1-4939-1847-8. OCLC 896824709.
