= Nikolay Strazhesko =

Ukrainian physiologist and therapist (1876–1952)

- Мико́ла Дми́трович Страже́ско
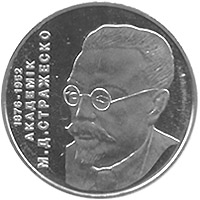
- A commemorative coin from the National Bank of Ukraine for Strazhesko
- Born: December 17, 1876; Odesa, Kherson Governorate, Russian Empire
- Died: June 27, 1952 (aged 75); Kyiv, Ukrainian SSR, Soviet Union
- Burial place: Lukyanivske cemetery
- Education: Faculty of Medicine of the Kyiv Imperial University of St. Volodymyr
- Occupations: Physiologist; Therapist
- Medical career
- Institutions: Kyiv Medical Institute; Kyiv Women's Medical Institute; Odesa University; Institute of Experimental Biology and Pathology; Institute of Clinical Physiology

Nikolay Strazhesko (also transliterated as Mykola Strazhesko; 17 December 1876 - 27 June 1952) was a Ukrainian physiologist and therapist. Over his career, he worked in a variety of institutes and clinics, although he is perhaps most famous for founding and being the inaugural Director of the Ukrainian Scientific Research Institute of Clinical Medicine.

Born in Odesa, then part of the Russian Empire, Strazhesko first became a student at the Faculty of Medicine at the Kyiv Imperial University of St. Volodymyr. After graduating, he worked in the Clinic of Inner Diseases there, before going abroad and then to St. Petersburg to learn more. In St. Petersburg, he did research at the S. M. Kirov Military Medical Academy and wrote his dissertation, before he again moved to Ukraine to Kyiv. There he became a senior resident and professor at the Taras Shevchenko National University of Kyiv while also being a professor at the Kyiv Women's Medical Institute and working at the Kyiv City Hospital. In 1919 he went to the Imperial Novorossiya University, before going back to the University of Kyiv in 1922, where he worked at until 1936 in internal medicine. In 1936 he founded the Ukrainian Scientific Research Institute of Clinical Medicine there, but due to the Nazi occupation of Ukraine he had to move again to Ufa. He returned to present-day Ukraine in 1944, and again became director of the institute, which he did until his death in 1952.

== Early life ==
Strazhesko was born on 17 December 1876 in Odesa, which was part of the Kherson Governorate in the Russian Empire at the time of his birth. His father was a state councilor and lawyer while his mother was a descendent of the Hetman of Zaporizhian Cossacks, Petro Konashevych-Sahaidachny. After graduating from the Odesa gymnasium, he became a student of the Faculty of Medicine at the Kyiv Imperial University of St. Volodymyr, where he graduated from in 1899 with a doctor's diploma in honors.

== Medical career ==
After graduating, he started studying under Professor V. P. Obraztsov at the Clinic of Inner Diseases at his alma mater. Concurrently, in 1900, he became an intern at the therapeutic department of Kyiv City Hospital. In 1901, he briefly went to West Europe to practice in leading clinics with a specialization in cardiology at Berlin, Munich, and Paris, where he learned more about Western methods of examination of patients. In 1902 he passed his exams to become a candidate in medicine, and so he decided to move to St. Petersburg. For the next 2 years he did research in St. Petersburg at the S. M. Kirov Military Medical Academy under Ivan Pavlov, and in 1904, he received his degree of Doctor of Medicine after writing his dissertation on the physiology of the digestive track.

In 1904 he started being the senior resident at the therapeutic clinic of the Taras Shevchenko National University of Kyiv. In 1908 he became a private associate professor of the University of Kyiv, while at the same time being a professor at the Kyiv Women's Medical Institute, both of which he did until 1919. In 1917 he also started heading the Department of Propaedeutic Therapy at the Kyiv City Hospital. From 1919 to 1922 he then headed the Department of the Faculty of Medicine's Therapeutic Clinic at the Imperial Novorossiya University (now Odesa University). In the 1921/1922 school year, he submitted a request to be relieved of his deputies, which was rejected in September 1921 as they deemed him irreplaceable. In November, however, the People's Commissariat for Education of the Ukrainian SSR, Y. P. Ryappo, instructed Odesa to transfer him to Kyiv so he could take over the department there. By Order No. 11 of February 1922, when he was head of then-called First Faculty Therapeutic Clinic, he was transferred to Kyiv University.

From 1922 to 1936 he then remained at the Kyiv Medical Institute, working in internal medicine. During this time, his most notable work was creating a manual on the physical diagnosis of abdominal diseases in 1924, helped prove the streptococcal etiology of rheumatic fever in 1934, and creating a classification system of congestive heart failure in 1935. On 27 May 1934, he was also chosen as an Academician of the National Academy of Sciences of Ukraine, where his specialization was listed as therapy. During his time there, he also became a fellow at the Institute of Physiology of the Academy of Sciences from 1934 to 1936, and was the founding director of the Ukrainian Scientific Research Institute of Clinical Medicine in 1936. During the Nazi occupation of Ukraine, he was evacuated to Ufa, where he continued to do his pedagogical activities and worked in the clinic of the Baskhir Medical Institute. In 1942 he became Head of the Department of the Therapeutic Clinic of the 1st Moscow Medical Institute in Ufa. In 1944, he returned to present-day Ukraine and continued as director of the Institute of Clinical Medicine, which he did until his death.

== Personal life ==
He had four children. His youngest died early on, and he agreed to send his two daughters to France, who were supposed to open up a restaurant in Paris although he could not legally maintain ties with them for leaving the Soviet Union. He also had one son, Dmitry, who became a chemist in Moscow. Strazhesko also had a brother, who was shot dead during the October Revolution in the streets for violating curfew.

=== Death ===
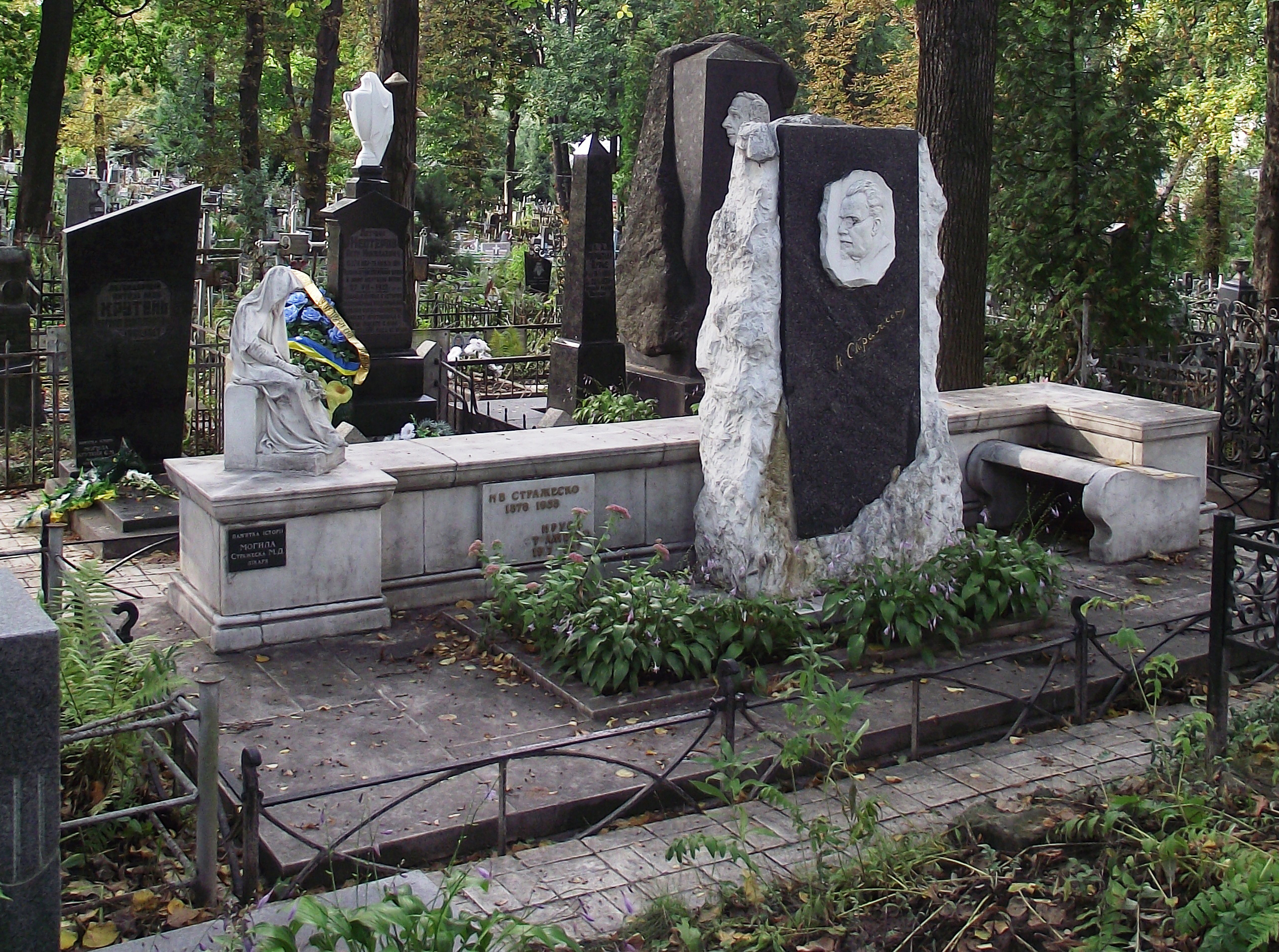
His grave at Lukyanivske cemetery.

In June 1952, one of his past students, Vladimir Vasilenko, became a defendant in the "Doctors' plot", where he was accused of murdering prominent politician Andrei Zhdanov and plotting to assassinate Joseph Stalin afterward. He was more than likely required to testify against his former student, which he returned to do and instead returned to Kyiv after going to Moscow to see his son Dmitry's thesis. He died of a heart attack on 27 June 1952.

== Honours and awards ==
The Prize of the National Academy of Sciences of Ukraine named after M. D. Strazhesko has been awarded in his honour for outstanding scientific works in the field of treatment of internal diseases and cardiology. The National Scientific Center "Institute of Cardiology, Clinical and Regenerative Medicine named after Academician M.D. Strazhesko of the National Academy of Medical Sciences of Ukraine" is also named after him. In 1961 in the Solomianskyi District of Kyiv, a street was named in honour of him. On 28 April 2006 the National Bank of Ukraine minted and circulated a commemorative coin in honour of the 130th anniversary of the birth of Strazhesko.
