= Phlegmasia cerulea dolens =

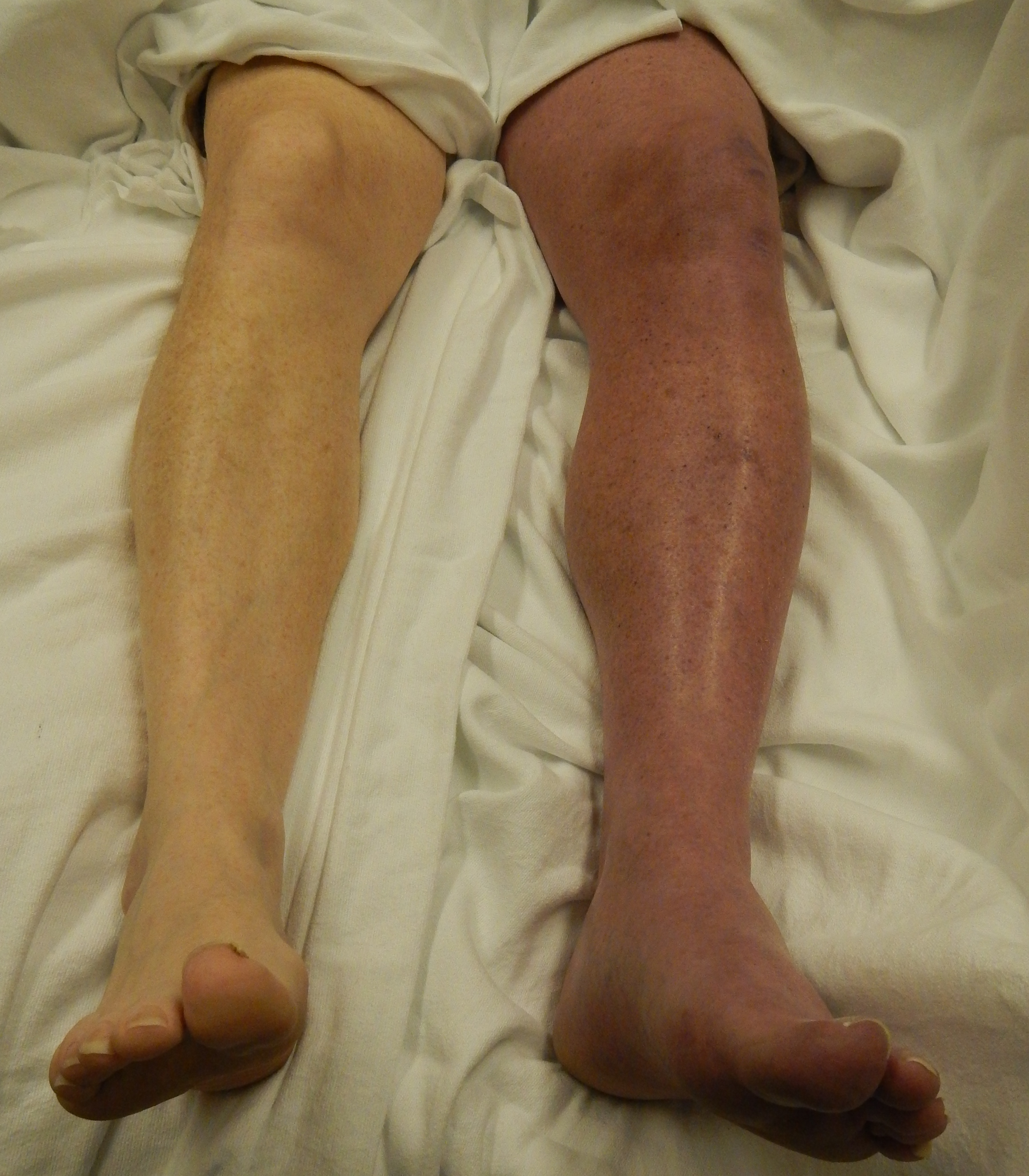
- A person with a two hour history of phlegmasia cerulea dolens (left leg, right side of image)

Phlegmasia cerulea dolens (PCD) (literally: 'painful blue inflammation'), not to be confused with preceding phlegmasia alba dolens, is an uncommon severe form of lower extremity deep venous thrombosis (DVT) that obstructs blood outflow from a vein. Upper extremity PCD is less common, occurring in under 10% of all cases. PCD results from extensive thrombotic occlusion (blockage by a thrombus) of extremity veins, most commonly an iliofemoral DVT, of the iliac vein and/or common femoral vein. It is a medical emergency requiring immediate evaluation and treatment.

== Symptoms and signs ==
=== Primary symptoms ===
It is characterized by progressive lower extremity edema distal to the thigh, tight shiny skin, cyanosis (inadequate blood oxygenation), petechiae or purpura, and sudden severe pain of the affected limb in proportion to the level of venous blockage. Patients often have difficulty walking. Blisters, bullae, paresthesias, and motor weakness may develop in severe cases, along with gangrene in ~50% of cases. Distal pulses are palpable early on but may diminish over time, and doppler signal can be usually heard throughout disease progression. The left limb is more commonly affected due to its vascular anatomy (the right internal iliac artery directly overlies the left iliac vein).

=== Associated diseases ===
PCD is associated with an underlying malignancy in 20-40% of cases. There is a high risk of massive pulmonary embolism, even under anticoagulation.

== Etiology ==
Risk factors, present in around 50% of documented cases, include malignancy, hyper-coagulable states, cardiac disease, venous stasis, venous insufficiency, May-Thurner syndrome (right iliac artery compressing the left iliac vein that runs beneath it), surgery, trauma, pregnancy, inferior vena cava (IVC) filter, hormone therapy, oral contraceptives, prolonged immobilization, inflammatory bowel disease, heart failure, and central venous catheters. Etiology is unknown in ~10% of PCD cases.

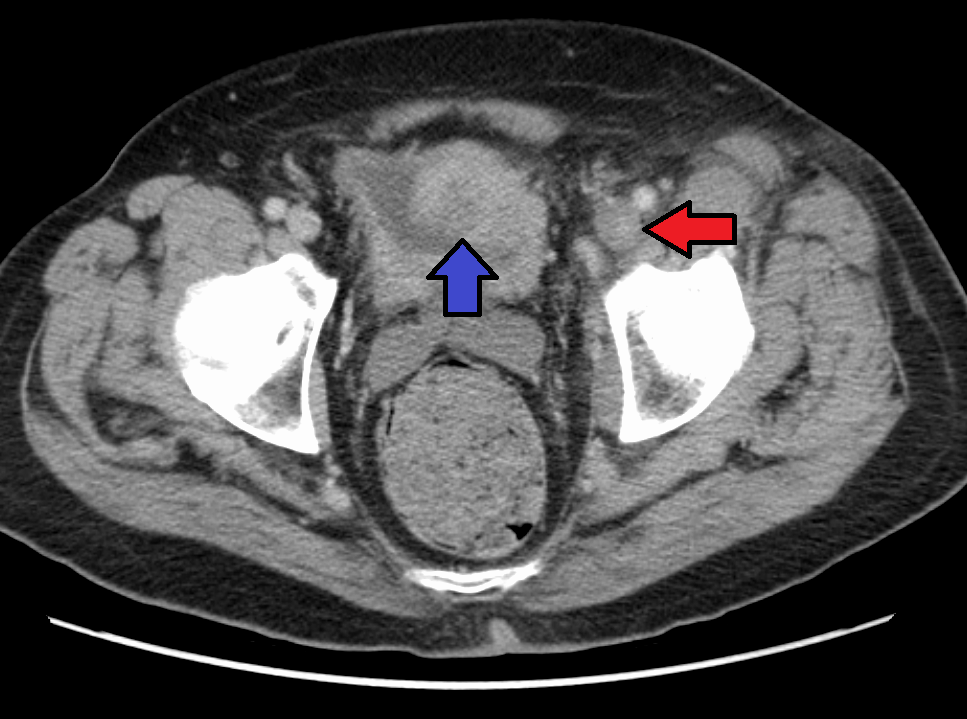
Deep vein thrombosis of the left external iliac in a person with bladder cancer resulting in this condition. (Author James Heilman, MD, 2016)

== Pathophysiology ==
When a thrombus occludes an extremity vein, pressure backs up in the venous system leading plasma fluid to leak out into the interstitium of the affected limb. This increases the pressure of that limb compartment, which can collapse the arteries and lead to acute ischemia, gangrene, hypovolemia, and hemodynamic instability.

== Diagnosis ==
PCD is best diagnosed with contrast venography, but venous duplex ultrasonography is used more commonly in clinical practice. Magnetic resonance and computed tomography venography can also be used.

=== Differential Diagnosis ===
DDx is as follows:

- Cellulitis
- Venous insufficiency
- Superficial thrombophlebitis
- DVT
- Arterial embolism
- Lymphedema
- Ruptured Bakers cyst

== Treatment ==
Treatment for PCD includes immediate anticoagulation, fluid resuscitation, bed rest, limb elevation above 60º, limb wrap to reduce pain and edema, and either catheter-based thrombolysis, percutaneous transluminal angioplasty, or surgical venous thrombectomy +/- fasciotomy to remove the blood clot. Some people also suggest an IVC filter before thrombolysis.

== Prognosis ==
PCD is fully reversible if the causal venous thrombus is promptly removed. In the 40-60% of people who go on to develop venous gangrene, there is a 20-50% risk of amputation and 20-40% mortality rate. Following PCD resolution patients are more likely to develop venous insufficiency and post-thrombotic syndrome

A grading system has been established:

- Grade I = non-complicated (no blistering, strong sensory-motor function and strong distal pulses)
- Grade II = impending venous gangrene (blistering, weak sensory-motor function and weak distal pulses)
- Grade III = venous gangrene

== Epidemiology ==
PCD is most likely to occur in people in their 50s and 60s, but can occur as early as 6 months old. There is slight male predominance of around 1.5:1.

== History ==
This phenomenon was first discovered by Fabricus Hildanius in the 16th century, and was officially termed "phlegmasia cerulea dolens" by Gregoire in 1938. Phlegmasia originates from the Greek root phlegma (inflammation), cerulea originates from Latin root caeruleus (dark blue), and dolens originates from Latin word dolens (suffering).
