= Vascular and Endovascular Surgery =

- Discipline: Vascular surgery
- Language: English
- Edited by: Thomas Maldonado

Publication details
- History: 1967-present
- Publisher: SAGE Publications
- Frequency: Monthly
- Impact factor: 0.859 (2018)

Standard abbreviations
- ISO 4: Vasc. Endovasc. Surg.

Indexing
- ISSN: 1538-5744 (print); 1938-9116 (web)
- OCLC no.: 52258854

Links
- Journal homepage; Online access; Online archive

Vascular and Endovascular Surgery is a monthly peer-reviewed medical journal that covers the field of vascular surgery. It was established in 1967 and is published by SAGE Publications. The editor-in-chief is Thomas Maldonado.

== Abstracting and indexing ==
The journal is abstracted and indexed in Scopus, and the Science Citation Index Expanded. According to the Journal Citation Reports, its 2012 impact factor is 0.859, ranking it 65 out of 65 journals in the category "Peripheral Vascular Disease" and 176 out of 203 journals in the category "Surgery".
