= Alexander Shalimov =

- Шалімов Олександр Олексійович
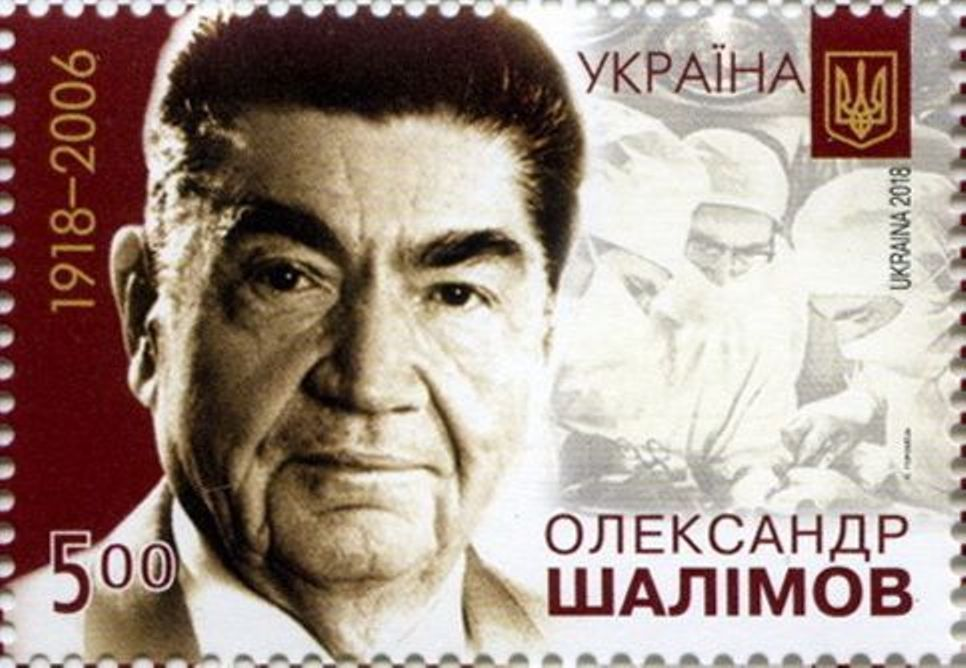
- Born: January 20, 1918; Vvedenka, Voronezh Governorate, RSFSR
- Died: February 28, 2006 (aged 88); Kyiv, Ukraine
- Resting place: Baikove Cemetery
- Education: Kuban State Medical University
- Occupations: physician and surgeon
- Known for: Shalimov National Institute of Surgery and Transplantation

Alexander Alekseyevich Shalimov (Ukrainian: Шалімов Олександр Олексійович; January 20, 1918 – February 28, 2006) was a Soviet and Ukrainian surgeon and one of the founders of the Shalimov National Institute of Surgery and Transplantation, which is named after him.

== Life ==
Alexander Shalimov was one of 11 children in a farming family, which moved to Kuban (Koshekhabl) in 1925, where he attended school. From 1934 to 1936 he attended the medical school of Kuban, which he graduated with honors. He then attended the Kuban State Medical University in Krasnodar, which he completed in 1941.

In September 1944 he became the chief physician and head of the surgical department of the city Baikal City Hospital in Petrovsk-Zabaykalsky. Since 1959 he held the Chair of Thoracic Surgery and Anesthesiology at the Kharkiv National Medical University. Starting in May 1970 he held the Chair of Surgery at the Kyiv Institute of Continuing Education. Since May 1971 he was the Director of the Research Institute of Hematology and Blood Transfusion. After July 1972 he was the director and after April 1988 the Honorary Director of the Research Institute for Clinical and Experimental Surgery. At the same time he was a chief surgeon of the Ukrainian Ministry of Healthcare. In the course of his career, he is believed to have performed 40,000 surgeries.

He died in 2006 in Kyiv and was buried in the Baikove Cemetery. In 2014 a monument was erected in his honor in Kyiv.

== Honors ==
Alexander Shalimov received numerous orders and honors.

- 1956 Honorary doctorate from the RSFSR
- 1967 Accomplished scientist
- 1977, 1985 State prize of the USSR
- Order of the October Revolution
- Order of the Red Banner of Labour
- 1982 Hero of Socialist Labour
- 1982 Order of Lenin
- 1985 USSR State Prize
- 1988 Honorary Director of the Kyiv Institute of Clinical and Experimental Surgery
- 1993 Ukrainian Order of Merit 3rd class
- 1998 Honorary citizen of the city of Kyiv
- 1999 Ukrainian Order of Merit 1st class
- 2001 Honorary citizen of Kharkiv
- 2005 Hero of Ukraine
- 2014 Monument in Kyiv
- 2018 On his 100th birthday the National Bank of Ukraine issued a two-hryvnia commemorative coin with his portrait within the series of coins Outstanding Personalities of Ukraine.
