= Fare (disambiguation) =

A fare is the fee paid by a passenger for use of a public transport system.

Fare or FARE may also refer to:

== Organisations ==
- Fare! (Act!), a 2015–2022 Italian political party
- Fare network, an anti-discrimination initiative in European football
- Food Allergy Research & Education, United States
- Forces Alternatives pour le Renouveau et l'Emergence (Alternative Forces for Renewal and Emergence), a Malian political party
- Foundation for Alcohol Research and Education, Australia
- Fuerza Aérea de la República Española, the Spanish Republican Air Force

== Other uses ==
- Fare, French Polynesia, a village on Huahine in the Society Islands, French Polynesia
- The Fare, a 2018 mystery film
- John Fare, a character in a 1968 story by N.B. Shein
- Fåre, a name of the Swedish island Fårö

== See also ==
- Fair (disambiguation)
- Faire (disambiguation)
- Fares (disambiguation)
- La Fare (disambiguation)
