= Faris =

Faris may refer to:

== People and fictional characters ==
- Faris (name), a given name and a surname

== Places ==
- Al-Faris, Salah al-Din Governorate, Iraq
- Fariš, North Macedonia
- Faris, Yemen
- Faris, Greece
- Faris Island, Nunavut, Canada
- Fāris, Arabic name for Persia

== See also ==
- Al-Faris 8-400, an armoured vehicle
- Fares (disambiguation)
- Farris (disambiguation)
- Pharis (disambiguation)
