= Ethnicity and association football =

Ethnicity and football is a description of the global acceptance of association football, with players from many races and countries participating. While football has moved around the world from its roots in England during the 18th century, the progress of non-European players has sometimes been hindered, with racism a continuing problem in many countries.

People of non-European races have sometimes not been accepted as players in European football. This has changed in recent times, due to societal change as well as campaigning on the part of the race lobby groups. UEFA and the European Union support the Football Against Racism in Europe (FARE) project which aims to stop racism.

== Globalization ==
Globalisation has created a sense of homogenised culture in football where players from different ethnic backgrounds have congregated in one particular team. This enables the team to form some kind of "supranational" (Maguire J, 2009) entity that in turns loses its local or national identity but gains a mixture of strengths that ideally improves the team's performance. A good example of this are the teams associated to the Premier League based in England. All of these teams are made up of players from different ethnic groups and are considered the best players in the World. Manchester United were crowned FIFA Club World Cup Champions in 2008, which exemplified the importance of ethnic diversity in a team - only three of the players in their championship game were of English background.

Globalisation has also affected football from a different perspective. John Nauright (2004) explains that during the globalisation process, local and national identity is celebrated especially during significant sporting events such as the Football World Cup. An estimated 715.1 million people from different countries and ultimately ethnic backgrounds watched the Football World Cup in 2006 which makes it the most viewed event in history. This results in businesses looking for opportunities to advertise their brand through sponsorship and funding which leads to commercialism in football.

== Commercialism ==
In 1992, Rupert Murdoch and British Sky Broadcasting purchased the rights to televise the English FA Premier League for 304 million English pounds which was 600% more than the previous contract. Matches were televised all over the world through satellite television which made the league the "crown jewel" of football. Since then, players from different ethnic backgrounds have strived to play in this league to achieve fame, money and satisfaction of reaching a defining peak in football excellence. Sales and revenue through advertising and technology have been determining factors in the commercialisation of football which has resulted in the globalisation of the sport. The main reason for sport organisations adopting the business model is to ensure their financial sustainability for the future. In order to gain a larger market share of audiences, well known football players from different countries who have loyal local fans are recruited. An example of this is Liverpool Football Club in the Premier League recruiting Fernando Torres from Spain where he played for a local club and had many supporters. This caused the loyal supporters to change allegiances as a sign of support for their player. This has in turn increased the ethnic diversity within the sporting code but also brought to attention the apparent racism associated among the players.

== Early football (1880–1960) ==
In several countries, black players were often harassed by spectators; stories of players being pelted with racial slurs, chants, and even bananas were quite commonplace, although there had been black players playing in Europe since the early days of football.

Andrew Watson, an amateur player, was capped for Scotland three times in the early 1880s, and played in the Scottish Cup for Queen's Park. Arthur Wharton, who played for Preston North End and Sheffield United, amongst others, is recognised as the world's first black professional footballer. Jack Leslie was the first black player to be selected for England, but never actually played for his country – which is thought to be due to the colour of his skin.

Frank Soo was the first (and so far only) ethnic Chinese person to play for England, during the Second World War, though these were not official internationals. Other non-white footballers in Britain in the early and mid-20th century included Eddie Parris, a black Welsh international; Mohammed Abdul Salim, an Indian playing for Celtic; Tewfik Abdullah, an Egyptian who played for Derby County; the Jamaican Lindy Delapenha, who won a title with Portsmouth before moving to Middlesbrough; his countryman Gil Heron, who played for Celtic; and Charlie Williams, a British black defender for Doncaster Rovers who later became a successful entertainer.

== Modern football (1960 onwards) ==
It was not until Viv Anderson that black footballers started to become accepted into the England national football team. Since then, many black players have played for England, and several have served as captain, notably Paul Ince, John Barnes and Sol Campbell.

Nowadays in the bigger leagues minority players have become part of football, and are supported. This was seen in the France national team which won the 1998 FIFA World Cup: the squad was composed of Frenchmen of various backgrounds, including immigrants from or descendants of several countries/colonies, such as Argentina (David Trezeguet), Senegal (Patrick Vieira), French Guiana (Bernard Lama), Martinique (Thierry Henry), Guadeloupe (Lilian Thuram and Bernard Diomède), Ghana (Marcel Desailly), plus a New Caledonian (Christian Karembeu), an ethnic Armenian and Kalmyk (Youri Djorkaeff), another player of Armenian descent (Alain Boghossian), a Basque speaker (Bixente Lizarazu) as well as captain Didier Deschamps from the same region, a Breton (Stephane Guivarc'h), Robert Pires whose parents hailed from Portugal and Spain, and an ethnic Berber (Zinedine Zidane). This composition was seen as an inheritance of former French colonialism, in a country where the proportion of immigrants still remains a source of tension and conflict.

Incidents in 2004 have also shown this to be the case in some bigger leagues, where there are a visible number of players from a different ethnicity. A notable incident occurred that year when England played Spain in Madrid, and home fans were heard by the world media to be making "monkey chants" at some of the black players on the pitch, forcing the Spanish football authorities to apologise for their fans.

On November 27, 2005, Marc Zoro, a player from Côte d'Ivoire, was playing for the Italian team Messina when he was racially abused by Inter Milan fans to the extent that he picked up the ball and threatened to leave the field. This caused the Italian football authorities to propose to start the following week's matches late after an anti-racism display. This came at the same time that European Union legislators were threatening Europe-wide legal sanctions against national football associations and clubs whose fans were seen to take part in racist actions.

== Australia ==
Ethnic minorities were instrumental in establishing the National Soccer League, which lasted from 1977 to 2004 as Australia's top-flight competition; however, clubs such as South Melbourne, Sydney Olympic, Sydney United, Adelaide City and Marconi were met with a policy established by League head David Hill to cut ties with their ethnicity. Names such as "Hellas", "Croatia" and "Juventus" were removed from clubs in an attempt to draw new supporters from outside of these ethnic groups, but falling attendances and financial difficulties caused the NSL to be disbanded. Eighteen months later, the A-League was launched with the National Club Identity Policy, a rule forbidding clubs from having ethnic ties, and several teams, such as Melbourne Victory and Central Coast Mariners, were newly created. Almost all of the old NSL powerhouses are now dominating their respective state leagues and the National Club Identity Policy was overturned in 2019 on the basis of being discriminatory.

== Religion in football ==
Sometimes certain clubs have often been connected with religious denominations, such as both Tottenham Hotspur and Ajax with Judaism, or the Old Firm Rangers F.C. and Celtic F.C. of Glasgow, who are seen to be Protestant and Roman Catholic respectively. This has led to problems with violence and occasionally death, but often equates to little more than derogatory nicknames.

== 'Oriental' footballers ==
Players of Oriental origin have had presence in European football. Hong Y 'Frank' Soo played 9 times for England during the Second World War. Sammy Chung coached Wolverhampton Wanderers to a UEFA Cup Final in 1972, and later as manager helped lead them to promotion from the old 2nd division to the old 1st division. Vikash Dhorasoo, of Indo-Mauritian descent, played for the France national team during the 2006 FIFA World Cup. South Korean Park Ji-Sung, who played for Manchester United, is an example of an Asian footballer who can be a rising star in big clubs in Europe. Park may be preceded by the Japanese player Hidetoshi Nakata, who played at various European clubs such as Perugia, AS Roma, Parma, Bologna, Fiorentina and lately at Bolton Wanderers. Another Japanese player, Shunsuke Nakamura, overcame criticism of his lack of pace and stamina, and helped seal Celtic's 2006–07 Scottish Premier League title. The most prominent example of an Asian player having a successful career in a big European League in the 20th century was Cha Bum-Kun, a Korean striker who played for Darmstadt, Frankfurt and Leverkusen in the German league, scoring 98 goals in 308 matches in Germany. He was later given the title Asia's Player of the Century by the International Federation of Football History and Statistics. Other Korean, Iranian, Chinese and Japanese football players have also gained starting places in their respective clubs in Europe. Some football clubs hire the Asian football stars hoping to increase merchandise sales from the player's respective Asian country. However, in Britain in 2007, there were complaints of a lack of Asian participants in top league football.

== See also ==
- Racism in association football
- Racism
- Football Against Racism in Europe
