= Tony Taylor (footballer, born 1946) =

Scottish footballer (born 1946)

Personal information
- Full name: Anthony Taylor
- Date of birth: 6 September 1946 (age 80)
- Place of birth: Glasgow, Scotland
- Height: 5 ft 9 in (1.75 m)
- Position: Left back

Youth career
- Barrhead Thistle
- 1962–1964: Kilmarnock
- 1964–1967: Celtic

Senior career*
Years	Team	Apps	(Gls)
1967–1968	Morton	22	(8)
1968–1974	Crystal Palace	195	(8)
1974–1976	Southend United	56	(1)
1975–1976	→ Hamilton Academical (loan)	8	(2)
1976–1977	Swindon Town	26	(0)
1977	Bristol Rovers	12	(0)
1977–1978	Portsmouth	17	(0)
1978–1979	Kilmarnock	2	(0)
1979	Albion Rovers	3	(0)
1979–1980	Northampton Town	4	(0)
1980	Panhellenic Toronto		
Total		345	(19)

Managerial career
- 1988–1989: Canada
- * Club domestic league appearances and goals

Anthony Taylor (born 6 September 1946) is a Scottish former professional footballer, who made 345 appearances in the Scottish League and Football League playing mainly as a left back.

== Playing career ==
Taylor began his career at Kilmarnock in 1962, before moving to Celtic from 1964 to 1967. However he did not make a first team appearance for either club.

In 1967, he signed for Morton making 22 appearances before signing for Crystal Palace on 31 October 1968. Taylor played in 195 league games for Crystal Palace between then and 1974, scoring eight goals. It was during this period that he was converted from a winger to left back. His debut came on 9 November 1968 in a 2–0 away win against Oxford United and Taylor was ever present for the remainder of that season (25 appearances) which saw Palace reach the top tier for the first time. In Crystal Palace's subsequent four seasons in the top flight, Taylor made 30, 36, 41 and 40 appearances respectively.

Crystal Palace were relegated in 1973 but Taylor was Player of the Year and remained thereafter making 20 appearances in the 1973–74 season before being transferred to Southend United in August 1974, where he made 56 appearances over two seasons. He then saw out his career with spells at, Swindon Town, Bristol Rovers, Portsmouth, Kilmarnock, Albion Rovers and Northampton Town.

== Coaching career ==
Taylor agreed to take over as player-manager of Athlone Town A.F.C. in August 1977 but despite playing some pre season friendlies resigned before the 1977–78 League of Ireland season commenced.

In 1980, he moved to Canada and played for Panhellenic, a Greek community team in the National Soccer League, a semi-pro Toronto league. The high point with this team was playing in a tournament against Benfica, Toronto First Portuguese and Partizan Belgrade.

After working as an assistant coach with Celtic, Taylor became coach of Canada's national boy's youth team in the 1980s. He also served as the (senior) national team manager during an unsuccessful bid to qualify for the 1990 FIFA World Cup finals.

In recent years, Taylor has been a technical staff member of the Burlington Youth Soccer Club in Burlington, Ontario.
