= Racism in association football =

Abuse of players, officials, and fans

Racism in association football is the abuse of players, officials, and fans because of their skin colour, nationality, or ethnicity. Some may also be targeted because of their association with an opposing team, although there have been instances of individuals being targeted by their own fans. The topic of racism in association football has been widely covered by the media and in academic studies. There have been a range of responses by various associations, such as FIFA and UEFA, as well as by teams, and individual players and managers to address the problem.

== The problem ==
Racism in association football (soccer) is the abuse of players, officials, and fans because of their skin colour, nationality, or ethnicity. Some may also be targeted because of their association with an opposing team. However, there have been instances of individuals being targeted by their own fans.

The topic of racism in association football has been widely covered by the media as well as academic studies.

== Responses ==
In response to racist incidents at association football matches, in May 2013, FIFA, the international governing body of association football, announced new measures to deal with racism in the sport.

In October 2018, German player Antonio Rüdiger, who has been a victim of racist abuse stated that authorities needed to do more to deal with racism in the sport.

In April 2019, UEFA president Aleksander Ceferin said referees should stop games if a racist incident occurs, whilst FIFA President Gianni Infantino called for "harsh sanctions" to deal with racism in the sport.

In April 2019, Raheem Sterling, called for racist abuse to be punished with an automatic nine-point deduction for clubs, instead of handing out fines to the individuals directly performing the abuse.

In April 2019, the Professional Footballer's Association launched a social media campaign to make a stand against racial abuse calling upon social media organizations and the game's authorities to take action against racism.

In November 2019 Leon Balogun said there needed to be a collective response from players to racism.

Fatma Samoura, a black Muslim woman who occupied the position of Secretary General of FIFA from June 2016 to 31 December 2023, has said that her "last battle, and one that [she] will continue to fight even after [her] retirement from FIFA, is to make sure that we will root racism out of football".

In June 2025, FIFA was criticised for a lack of anti-racism messages at the 2025 Club World Cup.

In September 2025, FIFA launched an anti-racism panel consisting of 16 former players.

== Africa ==
=== Morocco ===
After the loss of Argentina against Morocco during Group B stage in the 2024 Olympics, Argentine fans took to social media to attack Achraf Hakimi with racist and Islamophobic language. Hakimi was also attacked with similar language by Spanish fans after the latter country's victory in the quarterfinals of the Olympic competition.

=== Nigeria ===
Esther Okoronkwo had shared accusations of theft on social media ahead of the 2026 Women's Africa Cup of Nations in Morocco. Although the perpetrators were arrested, she was subjected to racist language and imagery on social media; the Nigerian Football Federation and her club AFC Toronto condemned the incident.

=== Senegal ===
Prior to Senegal's group-stage match against Japan in the 2018 FIFA World Cup, business magnate Alan Sugar tweeted a photo of the Senegal team with the caption: "I recognise some of these guys from the beach in Marbella. Multitasking, resourceful chaps". The tweet was criticised for being racist, with Osasu Obayiuwana, the associate editor of the New African magazine claiming that Sugar was playing "to a racist stereotype" and that "no Senegalese or African will see this as funny". Sugar quickly apologised for the remark, tweeting "I misjudged me [sic] earlier tweet. It was in no way intended to cause offence, and clearly my attempt at humour has backfired. I have deleted the tweet and am very sorry".

In March 2022, the Egyptian national team said they had been racially abused by Senegal fans.

=== South Africa ===
From 1910 to 1991, South Africa had segregation policies before and under the Apartheid system as well as segregated football leagues in which the designated "black" race were not allowed to play in the Football Association of South Africa. During the mid-1950s attempts by mainly South African blacks to desegregate the sport were stifled by FASA. In 1961, the FASA was suspended by the International Federation of Association Football for not complying with desegregation policies. During 1963, the ban was briefly lifted until it was reinstated in 1964 and remained in place for 28 years. In 1973, the South African games were held, and attempts by the South African government to keep the games segregated and the teams racially determined and confined led to the International Federation of Association Football to pull its support from the event. They were drawn in due to the promise of it being a non-racial event, but upon discovering that the teams were racially determined and the sports events themselves had segregated attendance, FIFA backed out. The South African Football Association (SAFA) was formed in December 1991 right before the end of Apartheid in South Africa in 1994, and has no racial requirements for play and entry.

=== Tunisia ===
Following the defeat of Tunisia's national football team to Equatorial Guinea in the 2015 African Cup of Nations, at least twelve attacks were reported to have occurred in the capital and the southern city of Sfax. Some of these attacks were even against darker-skinned Tunisians due to their resemblance to sub-Saharan Africans. This was extended to social media through posts which focused on enslaving blacks and letting them be killed by Boko Haram, a radical group.

=== Zambia ===
Hanif Adams, the owner of Lusaka Dynamos, was subject to racist remarks due to his Indian heritage while running for president of the Football Association of Zambia (FAZ). Some individuals have been cited saying that a foreigner should not run FAZ. An individual when asked for reasoning stated that, "For the sake of national pride and patriotism, Faz should be run by indigenous black Zambians and not Indians or Pakistanis." Lusaka Dynamos neglected to back down from the race and told BBC Sport, "I am very disappointed for people bringing race issues into matters of football or any matter concerning the development of any country."

== Asia ==
Football racism and violence have decreased considerably during the 1990s through appropriate legislation such as the Football Offences Act (1991) which made racist chanting unlawful. However, racist chanting has not completely disappeared and much current abuse is linked to Asians, resulting in many still feeling intimidated. Institutionalized racism plays a large part in reducing prospects for footballing recruits from Asian communities. In a study conducted by Bains and Patel, it was recorded that over 90 percent of the Asian Heritage respondents saw both institutional racism and the existence of racist supporters as being barriers to entry into the professional game. Many cases of segregation have been recorded resulting in many Asians playing in 'Asian only leagues', thus distancing themselves further from mainstream society and popular culture. Subjection to overt racist abuse from coaches, players and spectators is a primary common denominator for many Asian footballers leading to feelings of isolation and exclusion from after-training socializing and ritual young male bonding.

Researchers who wrote the Asians Can't Play Football report somewhat presciently uncovered a culpable order of ignorance and thinly disguised racism that had proscribed any sustained South Asian progression in the game. Numerous problematic stereotypes still have a firm hold over the Asian identity. The standard stereotype of South Asian people is one of the submissive, naturally placid and physically frail individual. It has been stated that the Asian build is not that of a footballer and that the stereotype of "weak Asian" is influenced by notions of 'race' and issues of national identity. Common stereotypes list the Asian pupil as typically seen as physically frail, lacking in stamina and likely to underachieve. A 'Commission for Racial Equality (CRE) survey highlighted that there were only 10 Asian players at Premier League academies' 48 and in 2006, there were 'only four Asian players in the professional game'. These stereotypes exist because there is an under-achievement and if they subsist, 'scouts, coaches, and managers' will not visit places of high Asian population. What unites most South Asian teams is the common experience of racism and a particular racism that is parasitically exacted through football.

=== China ===
On 4 August 2018, Demba Ba was the victim of alleged racial abuse by Changchun Yatai player Zhang Li.

In June 2020, Odion Ighalo revealed that in one game in China he got called all sorts of names and reported it to the FA, but he did not press forward with it because he "[didn't] like to drag issues out".

=== Hong Kong ===
There were reports of targeted racial attacks against the Philippine national team while they competed at Mongkok Stadium in a friendly against Hong Kong. The event was held on 4 June 2013. Hong Kong fans reportedly called their counterparts "slaves", threw bottles at them and booed at the Philippine national anthem. Hong Kong lost the friendly match to the Philippines, 1–0. At the end of the game, Hong Kong fans reportedly threw debris at the Philippine team and gallery, occupied mostly by wives and children of the players.

Benny Chan, spokesman of the Hong Kong Football Association, announced that the football body will release an official report to FIFA and the public after its investigation is completed. Philippine football officials are likewise waiting for the report before filing a complaint to FIFA.

=== India ===
In May 2020, Indian captain Sunil Chhetri faced racist comments during his Instagram Live session with Indian cricket captain Virat Kohli.

=== Japan ===
In March 2014, J1 League club Urawa Red Diamonds had to play to an empty stadium; their fans had been banned following racist banners displayed in previous matches.

=== Malaysia ===
In February 2019, Antonio German left Malaysian club Selangor one month into a one-year contract; he later said he left the club due to racism.

=== Philippines ===
The Philippine Football Federation filed a complaint with GMA Network over a comment made by news anchor Arnold Clavio over controversial remarks directed at the Philippines national football team. A popular radio and television newscaster and program host of morning news show Unang Hirit, Clavio was quoted as saying that foreign-born players are not Filipinos (emphasizing the fact that they were not born in the Philippines). Clavio later retracted this statement, insisting that he had not intended to offend anyone.

Another racial incident occurred during a friendly match between the Philippines and Indonesia on 5 June 2012. A number of Indonesian fans were observed to be chanting "Hindi kayo Pilipino!" ("You are not Filipinos!") at Filipino players of non-Philippine ancestry.

=== South Korea ===
Federico Valverde was accused of making a racist gesture by pulling his eyes back into a slit when celebrating a goal, at the Under-20 World Cup in South Korea.

In the 2018 FIFA World Cup, South Korea was a target of racism by Mexican television hosts following South Korea's win over Germany. After Germany's defeat, the two Mexican hosts, on-air, were seen pulling their eyes back into a slit. The hosts, following the incident, were fired by Telemundo, the television network they were employed by. After the same match, Mexican soccer supporters rushed to the South Korean embassy to celebrate. The supporters were also seen pulling their eyes back.

== Europe ==
In European association football, critics claim there is racism operating at the institutional and fan cultural levels. There are legislative restrictions that limit the number of 'non-citizens' within a team in ⅓ of the countries in the EU, specifically targeting certain minorities. Therefore, there is 'invisible centrality of whiteness' that permeates the upper levels of the football system.

South Asian players are considered "static" and "homogenous" while black players are considered to be "'difficult', 'bad tempered' and 'lacking in social etiquette" by clubs in Netherlands. Within local areas such as Amsterdam, a sort of neighborhood nationalism develops that also contributes to this discrimination towards players of different origins.

There have been a few groups who have attempted to assuage the problem of racial discrimination in European football such as the UEFA (Union of European Football Associations) who held a seminar in Amsterdam encouraging racial equality in the industry with attendees from countries across Europe. A campaign called 'Let's Kick Racism Out of Football' was launched in 1993 in Britain to also increase awareness and facilitate dialogue about the issue.

In September 2023, SSC Napoli faced international accusations of racism and widespread condemnation after posting a video on their official TikTok account superimposing Nigerian striker Victor Osimhen's head onto a coconut, using the viral trend "I'm not a boy, I'm not a girl, I'm a coconut" as audio and on-screen text. In response, Osimhen's agent threatened legal action against the club.

=== Albania ===
In July 2024, Albania was one of seven countries who were sanctioned by UEFA following racism from their fans during Euro 2024.

=== Austria ===
In July 2024, Austria was one of seven countries who were sanctioned by UEFA following racism from their fans during Euro 2024.

=== Azerbaijan ===
In November 2020, UEFA fined Azerbaijani club Qarabağ FK €100,000 after the club's PR and media manager Nurlan İbrahimov made a hate speech on social network calling to "kill all the Armenians, old and young, without distinction" amid the Nagorno-Karabakh war. UEFA also announced that it has life banned the Qarabağ official for the "racist and other discriminatory conduct" targeting Armenians. Subsequently İbrahimov was declared wanted in Armenia.

In November 2025, English club Chelsea said that their academy players had been racially abused by fans in a match against FK Qarabag.

=== Belgium ===
Oguchi Onyewu, an American of Nigerian descent, has been punched and shouted at by racist fans while playing for Standard Liège. He has also had incidents with other players, such as Jelle Van Damme, who, according to Onyewu, repeatedly called him a "dirty ape" during the 2008–09 Championship playoff, even after Onyewu relayed the information to the referees. Van Damme denied the accusations following the match, and claimed that Onyewu had called him a "dirty Flemish". Approximately two weeks later, on 2 June 2009, it was announced by Onyewu's lawyer that he was suing Van Damme in an effort to end on-field racism in European football.

Zola Matumona left FC Brussels after he accused club chairman Johan Vermeersch of making racist remarks towards him during a crisis meeting at the struggling club. He is reported to have told Matumona to "think about other things than trees and bananas".

In December 2021, Anderlecht head coach Vincent Kompany was racially abused by Club Bruges fans during a match.

Belgium national football team coach Rudi Garcia said after a 2026 FIFA World Cup match that the Senegal national football team was one of "those teams that tend to lose their tactical structure towards the end of the match." The comments led to accusations of painting stereotypes toward African football teams.

=== Bulgaria ===
In 2011, England national team players Ashley Young, Ashley Cole and Theo Walcott were subjected to racist abuse by Bulgarian fans.

In 2013, fans of Levski Sofia unveiled a banner wishing 'happy birthday' to Adolf Hitler. In 2018 Levski Sofia were fined after fans, including children, were seen making Nazi salutes.

In September 2019, the England national team said they were going to prepare a plan for dealing with possible racist abuse during a forthcoming game in Bulgaria. The plan was later reiterated by player Tammy Abraham, while Southgate said he understood why Bulgarian footballing authorities had been offended. Bulgaria national team manager Krasimir Balakov responded by saying racism was more of a problem in England than Bulgaria. The match, which resulted in a 6–0 England victory, was marred by racist chants and salutes from some Bulgarian fans, and was halted twice as a result. England player Jordan Henderson said the players wanted to make the Bulgarian fans "suffer" for their racist abuse with a big defeat.

The Bulgarian Prime Minister Boyko Borissov told Borislav Mihaylov, the head of the Bulgarian Football Union, to resign, which he did later that day. National team manager Balakov claimed not to have heard any racist chanting, while goalkeeper Plamen Iliev defended the fans, saying they had been well behaved. Balakov also later resigned his role as national team manager.

UEFA president Aleksander Čeferin said they would "wage war on the racists", and would decide on a punishment for Bulgaria. The next day UEFA announced that the Bulgarian FA would be fined 75,000 euros and forced to play two matches behind closed doors.

Four fans were later arrested by police, and were fined and banned by the Bulgarian FA. Five more fans were then arrested. By 29 October 2019 there had been 12 arrests.

In May 2022, the players of CSKA Sofia had bananas and bottles thrown at them by fans who were angered after the team lost the Bulgarian Cup Final against archrivals Levski Sofia. Subsequently, four of CSKA's black players refused to play in their team's next match against Botev Plovdiv. In June 2022, CSKA Sofia's manager Alan Pardew confirmed that he is leaving the club, citing as one of the principal reasons the racism directed at the players and his assistant Alex Dyer by a small group of organized fans.

=== Croatia ===
Henri Belle moved to Croatia at the beginning of 2011, signing with Istra 1961. He drew attention to himself both by good games and through receiving racist taunts from Bad Blue Boys.

In April 2018, Dinamo Zagreb were punished for the racist actions of their fans.

In July 2024, Croatia was one of seven countries who were sanctioned by UEFA following racism from their fans during Euro 2024.

=== France ===
On 14 April 1990, during a 1989-90 season match between Girondins de Bordeaux and Olympique Marseille, the Cameroonian goalkeeper Joseph-Antoine Bell was victim of racist acts at his return at Stade Vélodrome when he played for Bordeaux. During the entire match, some Marseille ultras threw bananas towards him and taunted him with monkey chants and the racist chant "Joseph tu pues, va te laver le cul!" ("Joseph you stink, go wash your ass!") to the tune of Serge Gainsbourg's song Couleur café. This incident revealed to the broad daylight the rise of racism in the French stadia during the late 1980s, to incite the French club officials to look into said problem to remediate.

In January 2005, as part of an anti-racism initiative in Ligue 1, Paris Saint-Germain's players wore all-white jerseys and the opposing Lens players wore all-black during a French league match. The move backfired after racist elements among PSG's crowd in the Kop of Boulogne sung "Come on the whites". The racist overtone was exacerbated by monkey chants from the Boulogne crowd whenever a Lens player touched the ball.

On 23 November 2006 in a game between Paris Saint-Germain and Haopel Tel Aviv, a police officer, as well as many players on the field were targets of racial slurs. The police officer being chanted at threw teargas into the stands and shot his gun, killing one and injuring another.

On 18 April 2007, Lyon player Milan Baroš was accused of racially abusing Rennes' Stéphane Mbia by implying that Mbia smelt. On 4 May, he was found guilty of the gesture, but found not guilty of racism, and was banned for three league matches.

On 17 September 2007, Libourne's Burkinabe player Boubacar Kébé was abused by fans of Bastia; he was red-carded for retaliating. In February 2008, Bastia was again at the centre of controversy when their fans unfurled a racist banner which read as "Kébé, on n'est pas raciste... La preuve on t'encule!" (Kébé, we are not racists... we'll fuck you to prove it!), again aimed at Kébé, which delayed the kick-off of the match by three minutes.

On 17 February 2008, Abdeslam Ouaddou of Valenciennes was racially abused by a fan from opponents Metz; Metz and the Ligue de Football Professionnel announced that they would be suing the fan in question. The match referee did not see the incident, and so booked Ouaddou for challenging the fan. Valenciennes Chairman Francis Decourrière later demanded that the match be replayed "in front of children from Valenciennes and Metz". Following this incident, the French Football Federation made steps to introduce harsher punishments.

In March 2008, Bastia's Frédéric Mendy claimed he had been racially abused by Grenoble fans.

In November 2013, former defender and the France national team's most-capped player, Lilian Thuram, has said white players need to show solidarity with players who receive racist abuse, saying, "The action of not saying anything – somehow – it makes you an accomplice."

On 13 November 2020, during the match between Paris Saint-Germain and Olympique Marseille, the PSG striker Neymar risked to be suspended for 10 matches after racially abusing Marseille's Japanese fullback Hiroki Sakai twice by calling him a "fucking Chinese" after telling Sakai to "go away" after Marseille player Álvaro González called Neymar ("fucking monkey" after the latter called Gonzalez a "fucking faggot".

On 8 December 2020 a Champions League match between Paris Saint-Germain and Istanbul Basaksehir was suspended after the fourth official allegedly used a racist term towards Istanbul assistant coach, Pierre Webó. The incident occurred 14 minutes into the game. Istanbul players left the pitch in protest with PSG players following. The match was abandoned and was scheduled to recommence on 9 December.

On 29 November 2021 after a 1-0 win from Troyes, South Korean striker Suk Hyun-jun was racially abused by reserve players of Marseille, who were caught saying "Le samouraï nous a decoupé deux fois" ("The samurai cut down us twice"), when the South Korean striker made a late tackle on Marseille player Pape Gueye, which was followed by "Il va faire des sushis" ("He [Suk] is going to make some sushi [out of him]"), around 10 minutes before the end of the match. Three days later Marseille condemned the incident stating "Olympique de Marseille joined the Troyes club in strongly condemning the remarks made towards Suk Hyun-jun... OM also offers its full support to the Troyes player".

In September 2022, during a friendly match between Brazil and Tunisia in Paris, Brazilian striker Richarlison had bananas thrown at him by fans.

In December 2022, Kylian Mbappé, Kingsley Coman, Randal Kolo Muani, and Aurélien Tchouameni were racially abused after their team's loss in the 2022 FIFA World Cup final.

In April 2023, PSG manager Christophe Galtier was accused of making racist comments whilst Nice manager, which he denied. In July 2023 it was announced that he would face trial in December. At the trial he denied the allegations. Galtier was acquitted of the charges by the court.

After the match between France and Argentina on the 2024 Paris Olympics, the social media accounts of Jean-Philippe Mateta and Loïc Badé were attacked with racist language and imagery.

In September 2024, PSG player Nuno Mendes was subjected to racism following a match, and in November 2024, Nantes player Sorba Thomas was also racially abused following a match.

=== Germany ===
In 1994, Borussia Dortmund star Júlio César threatened to leave the club after he was refused admission to a local nightclub because of him being black.

FC St. Pauli fans responded decisively to outbreaks of racism in the German game. With the slogan, Gegen rechts ('Against the Right'), a combination of fans and students took to the club's terraces in 1992 to protest against politically motivated racism.

In December 1992, three months after the Rostock-Lichtenhagen riots, all the teams in the German League followed the St. Pauli lead and, over one weekend, all players played in shirts displaying the slogan "Mein Freund ist Ausländer" ("My friend is a foreigner"). The German Sports Youth's 1995 "No Chance for Hatred" campaign has promoted activities against racism and xenophobia on a national scale, encouraging local clubs to participate. This campaign has not spurred German football authorities into further action.

In 1996, Merkel 1996 reports that they vehemently refuse to acknowledge that racism is a major problem, and dismiss racist abuse as isolated incidents which are unrelated to the sport. Most of their measures are concerned with law and order — reducing violence at matches — but anti-racist action is very sparse.

Racism in German football is much more subtle than in other parts of Europe; monkey chanting have been replaced with codes, such as the number 88, which stands for "HH" or "Heil Hitler" ("H" is the eighth letter of the alphabet in both German and English). Some teams, for example Hannover 96, have banned such symbols from their stadiums.

In December 2005, in a game between FC Energie Cottbus and Dynamo Dresden, Cottbus displayed a large banner with the word "Juden" lined with the two stars of David. The "d" in "Juden" was based on the emblem of Dynamo Dresden. No penalties on this act of antisemitism were imposed nor was the banner confiscated, though it was quite publicized in the media.

On 25 March 2006, in a match between Sachsen Leipzig and Hallescher FC, Leipzig's Nigerian midfielder Adebowale Ogungbure was spat at and called a "nigger" and "ape" by opposition fans, who later aimed monkey noises at him. In retaliation he placed two fingers above his mouth in reference to Hitler's mustache and performed a Nazi salute. Ogungbure was arrested by German police, as it is illegal to make Nazi gestures for political or abusive purposes, but criminal proceedings were dropped 24 hours later.

In April 2006, in a match between St. Pauli and Chemnitzer FC, visiting Chemnitz fans stormed Turkish-owned stores chanting "Sieg Heil" and waving imitation Nazi flags. Some shouted, "We're going to build a subway from St Pauli to Auschwitz."

Ghana-born German international striker Gerald Asamoah has frequently been the target of racist abuse. On 10 September 2006, Hansa Rostock were investigated for racist abuse in a friendly game and were subsequently found guilty; the team was fined $25,000.

On 19 August 2007, it was announced that Borussia Dortmund goalkeeper Roman Weidenfeller would be investigated by the German Football Association (DFB) after apparently calling Asamoah a "black pig".

On 4 February 2007, a racist German football fan was apprehended by fellow fans during a match between Energie Cottbus and VfL Bochum, and faces a lifetime ban. Racist chants in Cottbus are said to be commonplace.

Torsten Ziegner was given a five-match ban in October 2008 for racially abusing Nigerian player Kingsley Onuegbu during a match against Eintracht Braunschweig.

On 22 July 2018, Mesut Özil (of Turkish origin) announced his retirement from the German national team, citing racism. He Tweeted in his statement posted on Twitter, Özil wrote: "In the eyes of Grindel and his supporters, I am German when we win, but I am an immigrant when we lose." The incident followed controversy in the German media following his photo with Turkish President Recep Tayyip Erdoğan.

In February 2020, an entire stadium chanted "Nazis out" during a game between Preussin Munster and Wurzburger Kickers after a fan made monkey noises towards defender Leroy Kwadwo. On 20 March 2021, Borussia Dortmund midfielder Jude Bellingham received racist abuse on Instagram after his side drew 2–2 with FC Köln. In May 2021, Hertha Berlin sacked Jens Lehmann after a racist WhatsApp message to Dennis Aogo was made public.

In 2022, during WELT-TV's coverage of the 2022 FIFA World Cup, German former footballer and pundit Jimmy Hartwig was criticised on social media by fans after two videos of him were published. In the first video, where he analysed Germany's early exit from the tournament with the WELT-TV host Carsten Hädler, Hartwig uttered the words "ching chang chong" followed by a bow, perceived as racism against East Asians, with a presumably Japanese Twitter user accused Hartwig of hypocrisy, by telling in a post that "Jimmy Hartwig says he is against racism based on his own experiences, but it's a pity that he did not hesitate discriminating against Asians with "ching chang chong"". The second video was when Hartwig and two other commentators, commenting about the last two group stage matches, said that Germany did not have a chance of winning the World Cup and that he hoped that Spain won, referring to Spain as "the toreros" and Japan as "the rice department" ("Reisabteilung"). The WELT management company removed the videos from YouTube and Hartwig posted an apology on his Instagram.

In June 2024, national team manager Julian Nagelsmann criticised national broadcaster ARD for a poll regarding the ethnicity of national team players, with Nagelsmann saying it was "racist".

In July 2024, the under-18 team of English club Liverpool twice walked off the pitch during Bundesliga Cup matches against Hoffenheim and Frankfurt, due to racism directed towards one of their players.

=== Greece ===
In November 2023, Aberdeen player Pape Habib Guèye was allegedly racially abused by PAOK fans. UEFA said they would investigate the matter.

=== Hungary ===
On 8 June 2021, prior to a friendly game between Hungary and the Republic of Ireland, the Irish players had been booed by Hungarian fans prior to kick-off for taking the knee in a symbolic gesture against racism.

On 2 September 2021, England players Raheem Sterling and Jude Bellingham were both racially abused in Hungary's World Cup qualifier game with England and fans loudly booed the English players prior to kick off for taking the knee to protest against racism. Hungary's players and manager Marco Rossi had asked supporters to respect England's gesture before the match. England's taking of the knee was again booed by Hungary fans (primarily children) in June 2022.

In July 2024, Hungary was one of seven countries who were sanctioned by UEFA following racism from their fans during Euro 2024.

=== Italy ===
In 1984, during a Derby della Mole match, Juventus supporters racially abused Torino's Brazilian midfielder Léo Júnior by displaying banners with racist phrases. In retaliation, Torino's fans responded with a banner with written Meglio negro che juventino ("Better [being a] negro than a Juventus fan"). In In that same year, Júnior also suffered another incident of racism. After Torino played an away match against AC Milan, Milan's supporters repeatedly shouted insults and spat at him while he was going out of the field with his mother and his godfather.

In 1989, after Udinese paid Standard Liège £ 1.500.000 to sign Israeli striker Ronny Rosenthal, the team directors were under pressure from Hooligans Teddy Boys, an extremist fringe of the Udinese's ultras, which sent blackmail letter signed with a swastika to club president Giampaolo Pozzo to not sign a Jewish footballer and vandalized the club's headquarters with antisemitic writings such as Non vogliamo ebrei al Friuli ("We don't want Jews at the Friuli"), "Rosenthal, vai al forno" ("Rosenthal, go to the oven"). and Rosenthal Go Home, this latter being accompanied by a skull with crossed bones. As a result of this intimidatory behaviour, Udinese signed Abel Balbo instead. The media outcry resulted in a parliamentary interrogation, and later, Rosenthal sued the club for moral damages: in 1995, the Italian judicial authorities found the club responsible of discriminatory behaviour, sentencing it to a compensation of 61 million lire. This was not the first time a player was threatened by said fringe of Udinese's ultras: In October 1986, Udinese's Peruvian striker Gerónimo Barbadillo was target of racial abuse by said fans, who vandalized the perimeter walls of his residence with insults such as "Negro di merda, vattene" (Fucking nigger, go away") and sending death threats to him and his family via telephone after the club was consensually negotiating the termination of his contract to sign with Daniel Bertoni.

Black footballers playing in the Serie A top flight in 1992–93 were also racially abused. Two black Dutch players, Ruud Gullit and Aron Winter, have spoken out against such racist taunts. Their complaints spurred a day of action on 13 December 1992, with the slogan "No al razzismo!" ("No to racism") being paraded by all players in the two Italian divisions.

On 28 April 1996, when Dutch player Maickel Ferrier signed with Hellas Verona, the club's ultras (which are not new to racism behaviour), protested against the signing by hanging a black mannequin (to represent Ferrier) with a banner with a message in Veronese dialect written "El negro i ve la regalà. Dasighe el stadio da netarǃ!" (The nigger was given to you. Give him the stadium to clean!!) at Stadio Marcantonio Bentegodi.

Paul Ince also complained about open abuse during his spell with Inter Milan in Italy between 1995 and 1997.

On 27 November 2005, Marco Zoro attempted to stop the Messina–Inter match by leaving the field with the ball after being tormented by racist taunts from some Inter supporters. He was eventually convinced to keep playing by other players, notably by Inter's Adriano. These facts then brought strong and unanimous condemnations by the whole football community within Italy, and a five-minute delay for an anti-racism display for all the matches to be played in the next week in the country. The actions of the Inter supporters were also brought to the attention of the European football governing body UEFA and the EU.

In April 2009, Inter's Mario Balotelli, an Italian footballer of Ghanaian descent, was subjected to racial abuse from Juventus fans. They were handed a one-game home fan ban as a result. At UEFA Euro 2012 playing for Italy, he fell victim to monkey chants during a match against Spain. After Italy defeated England in the quarter-finals, Italian newspaper Gazzetta dello Sport published a cartoon depicting Balotelli as King Kong on top of Big Ben. After his move from Milan to Liverpool in August 2014, he was the target of more than 8,000 abusive posts on social media between that time, and by March 2015, more than 4,000 of these posts were racist in nature.

On 3 January 2013, then-Milan midfielder Kevin Prince-Boateng, as well as the remainder of his Milan teammates, walked off the pitch early in a friendly match against lower league side Pro Patria after enduring racial abuse from fans of the latter.

On 11 May 2014, bananas were thrown at Milan's Kévin Constant and Nigel de Jong, both black, by Atalanta fans during their Milan's 2–1 defeat. Atalanta were later fined €40,000.

On 12 June 2015, Croatian national team supporters marked a swastika on the soccer pitch prior to their match against the Italy national team. As a punishment, The Union of European Football Associations (UEFA) ordered a £70,000 fine to the Croatians. On top of the fine, the Croatian team was forced to play their next two home matches in an empty stadium.

In April 2019, Juventus forward Moise Kean was subject to racist chants by Cagliari fans. Juventus teammate Leonardo Bonucci was heavily criticised after stating that Kean was partly to blame by his celebration which caused further jeers, by England international Raheem Sterling who deemed the comments 'laughable', compatriot Mario Balotelli, English singer Stormzy, and former Juventus player Paul Pogba. Bonucci implied that Kean's celebration caused further jeers, stating to Sky Sport Italia: "Kean knows that when he scores a goal, he has to focus on celebrating with his teammates. He knows he could've done something differently too. There were racist jeers after the goal, Blaise heard it and was angered. I think the blame is 50–50, because Moise shouldn't have done that and the Curva should not have reacted that way. We are professionals, we have to set the example and not provoke anyone." Later, he made a post on Instagram which read "Regardless of everything, in any case... no to racism." In response to the criticism, the following day, Bonucci posted on Instagram: "After 24 hours I want to clarify my feelings. Yesterday I was interviewed right at the end of the game, and my words have been clearly misunderstood, probably because I was too hasty in the way I expressed my thoughts. Hours and years wouldn't be enough to talk about this topic. I firmly condemn all forms of racism and discrimination. The abuses are not acceptable at all and this must not be misunderstood."

In August 2019, Romelu Lukaku was racially abused by Cagliari opposition fans. He later said that the sport was "going backwards" on racism. An Inter fan group called Curva Nord later said that the monkey chants from opposition fans were a sign of respect towards Lukaku. Italian TV pundit Luciano Passirani was later banned for making racist comments about Lukaku. On 15 September 2019, Franck Kessie was reportedly racially abused by Hellas Verona fans during a match with AC Milan. On 16 September 2019, Hellas Verona released a statement on their Twitter account and denied the happening. Later that month, Piara Powar of anti-discriminatory body Fare said that "the rot is deep" when discussing racism in Italian football.

In September 2019, FIFA President Gianni Infantino said the Italian FA should issue stadium bans for racist fans/clubs. Later that month Roma said they had banned a fan for racially abusing Juan Jesus.

In October 2019, Lazio were punished with a fine and a closed stadium after fans had been racist. In the same month, Sampdoria and England Under-21s midfielder Ronaldo Vieira was the target of alleged monkey chants from Roma fans in the 0-0 draw between the two sides.

In November 2019, Mario Balotelli was racially abused by opposition fans from Hellas Verona; he kicked the ball into the crowd and threatened to walk off the pitch. Balotelli later described the fans as "small minded". Hellas Verona banned the club's ultra leader from its games until June 2030, after a subsequent interview with him in which he openly called Balotelli racial slurs.

In December 2019 the Corriere dello Sport newspaper was criticised by AS Roma for using a 'Black Friday' headline accompanied by photographs of black players Romelu Lukaku and Chris Smalling. Later that month Serie A launched an anti-racism campaign featuring cartoon monkeys, which was criticised, with club AC Milan distancing itself from the campaign. Serie A later apologised.

On 12 September 2021, Tiémoué Bakayoko and Franck Kessie were targets of racial abuse by Lazio fans after Milan's 2-0 win. The incident was reported to be examined by the Italian Football Federation after a complaint from Milan. Bakayoko responded on Instagram: "To some Lazio fans and their racist cries towards to me and my brother [Kessie]. We are strong and proud of our skin colour. I have all my confidence in our club to identify them."

On 4 October 2021, following Napoli's 2–1 win against Fiorentina, Kalidou Koulibaly along with several other black players of Napoli including Victor Osimhen and André-Frank Zambo Anguissa were subjected to monkey chants. Fiorentina's general manager Joe Barone had publicly apologised to the players targeted. Koulibaly posted on Twitter calling for those who perpetrated the racial abuse to receive lifetime bans.

In October 2021 during an under-21 European Championship between Sweden and Italy, Swedish player Anthony Elanga was allegedly racially abused by an opponent. Italy denied the allegation in a statement: "With regards to the Swedish FA's claim and published by various media outlets, the FIGC deny in the strongest way possible the one of our under-21 players, during the Italy-Sweden game played in Monza yesterday, aimed a racist insult at an opposition player - an incident which, as far as we are aware, has not been founded by any match official or UEFA delegate".

On 20 March 2022, Milan players Fikayo Tomori and Mike Maignan were racially abused by Cagliari supporters after a 1-0 victory; Milan manager Stefano Pioli said both players told him they overheard racial abuse from the Cagliari end. Cagliari striker João Pedro claimed the allegations are false and defended his club's fans.

In January 2023, Lazio were ordered to close part of their stadium due to racist chants from their fans.

In April 2023, Romelu Lukaku suffered racist abuse from Juventus fans after scoring a late equaliser. Juventus were punished with a one-match partial stadium closure as punishment.

In June 2023, the Italian FA announced a ban of the number 88 on player shirts, due to anti-semitic connotations.

In January 2024, after Milan goalkeeper Mike Maignan was allegedly racially abused by Udinese fans, he and his teammates walked off the pitch. Following the incident, FIFA president Gianni Infantino said teams whose fans are racist should automatically forfeit games. Udinese also had to play their next game behind closed doors. Initially one Udinese fan was banned for life, before a further four received similar punishments.

In March 2024, Napoli player Juan Jesus was allegedly racially abused by Inter Milan player Francesco Acerbi, although no punishment was given due to lack of evidence. Napoli's player later took the knee in protest.

In July 2024, South Korean player Hwang Hee-chan was allegedly subjected to racism from a Como player in a pre-season friendly. His club Wolves complained, and the South Korean FA contacted FIFA regarding the incident. In October 2024, Como player Marco Curto was given a 10-game ban by FIFA for the incident.

=== Lithuania ===
On 24 March 2007, in a match between France and Lithuania, a banner was unfurled by Lithuanian supporters that depicted a map of Africa, painted with the French flag colors (blue, white and red), with a slogan of "Welcome to Europe."

=== Montenegro ===
In a match between Rangers and Zeta in August 2007, Rangers players DaMarcus Beasley (an African American) and Jean-Claude Darcheville (a black Frenchman) were subjected to racist abuse by Zeta players and Zeta were later fined £9,000.

In March 2019, during a match between Montenegro and England, several England players were allegedly subjected to monkey chants from Montenegro fans. UEFA charged the Montenegro FA with racist behaviour. Ex-player John Barnes said calls for players to walk off the pitch would not work.

As of April 2019, UEFA has punished Montenegro for their fans' racial abuse to some of the black players in the England national team. It occurred in a Euro 2020 qualifier between the two sides. The punishment includes paying a 20,000 euro fine and being forced to play their next qualifying match behind closed doors in an empty stadium. The Football Association has commented by saying that they hope the punishment "sends out a message" to those who feel inclined to racially abuse others.

=== Netherlands ===
In the 1980s Stanley Menzo was subjected to racist abuse from fans.

In a 1991 interview, Heerenveen manager Fritz Korbach racially abused two black players, calling Bryan Roy "a short fucking negro" and Romário "that coffee bean of PSV"). Furtherly, Korbach also insulted Simon Tahamata, who was of Moluccan descent, calling him a "train hijacker". During UEFA Euro 1996, the Afro-Surinamese Dutch player Edgar Davids was sent home after publicly alleging discrimination within the team's organization.

In 2004, a Dutch match between ADO Den Haag and PSV was abandoned after 80 minutes due to racist chanting from some members of the crowd.

In November 2006, Kenneth Perez received a five-game ban for shouting 'kankerneger' ('cancerous negro'), at black linesman Nicky Siebert.

In November 2011, Guyon Fernandez received a six-game ban for hitting opposition player Rens van Eijden. Fernandez claimed he was reacting to racist abuse from Van Eijden.

During the 2012–13 KNVB Cup quarter-final match between FC Den Bosch and AZ Alkmaar, American AZ Alkmaar forward Jozy Altidore was the target of racist chants. Den Bosch's director, Peter Bijvelds, blamed "malicious supporters making a scandalous mess of the evening". He said Den Bosch, AZ and the referee considered abandoning the match, but decided against it.

In November 2019 Ahmad Mendes Moreira was subjected to racism from opposition FC Den Bosch fans. Den Bosch initially tried to claim the sounds were crows, but later apologised for the claim. A few days later, Dutch international Georginio Wijnaldum celebrated an international goal by gesturing at his skin colour in support of Mendes Moreira, and later that month it was announced that players in the Dutch top two divisions would not play for the 1st minute of the next weekend's games in protest at racism.

In October 2024, Loum Tchaouna was racially abused in a match against Twente.

After their elimination from the 2026 FIFA World Cup on penalties against Morocco, Dutch national team players Justin Kluivert, Quinten Timber, and Crysencio Summerville, who all missed their penalties, suffered racial abuse on social media. The KVNB and Dutch Sports Minister Mirjam Sterk condemned the incident and said an investigation would be conducted.

=== North Macedonia ===
In July 2025, Aramide Oteh was racially abused by a fan in a match against FK Shkendija.

=== Norway ===
In one case, young player Caleb Francis was severely abused in his debut match for Kongsvinger IL. The abuse halted and nearly broke his career, but he returned to Kongsvinger's senior team after two years, and had a long career.

Several other players have experienced racism, often while playing national or club matches abroad. These players include Daniel Braaten and Pa Modou Kah.

Top-tier club Vålerenga Fotball famously used the slogan "Vålerenga Against Racism" instead of a shirt sponsor in the 1997 season. An official campaign, initiated by the footballers' trade union, is called "Give Racism the Red Card".

=== Poland ===
According to The Stephen Roth Institute for the Study of Contemporary Antisemitism and Racism, football stadiums in Poland are a recruiting ground for extremist organisations. As of 2001, neo-fascist symbols were a common sight there.

During the Extraordinary Congress of the International Football Federation (FIFA), held in Buenos Aires from 6–7 July 2001, the problem of racism in Polish football was discussed and Polish national football association was called to join the struggle against racism. The problem of anti-Semitism in Polish football has drawn international criticism. Poland was named as one of the worst offenders, in British Member of Parliament John Mann report, which describes anti-Semitic incidents in 18 countries across Europe. It was noted that Polish fans routinely call each other "Jews" as a term of abuse. In April 2008, ŁKS Łódź player Arkadiusz Mysona wore a shirt which said "Śmierć żydzewskiej kurwie" ("Death to Widzew-Jewish Whore", which is word play used by the LKS Łódź supporters, who call fans of their local rivals "Jews") after a match in the Polish Ekstraklasa. Mysona said afterwards that the shirt was given to him by a fan and he had not checked it.

In 2003, the Polish anti-racist "Never Again" Association organized a tournament with the slogan "Let's Kick Racism out of the Stadiums", imploring the Polish Football Association to act against racism in the sport. In 2012, ahead of UEFA Euro 2012, the Polish anti-racist "Never Again" Association launched one of the most extensive anti-racist campaigns in football, as a long-standing partner of the Fare network. The BBC Panorama program toured football matches in Poland before UEFA Euro 2012, jointly held in Poland and Ukraine. The journalists recorded "a chorus of anti-Semitic chanting" and witnessed "black football players enduring monkey chants from the terraces".

In March 2025, the Football Association of Ireland reported a racist incident in an under-17 match in Poland.

=== Portugal ===
In 2015, Portuguese international player Renato Sanches was targeted with monkey chants by Rio Ave supporters while leaving the pitch in a Benfica match at Vila do Conde. The player jokingly responded to the chants by clapping and making a monkey pose.

In 2017, former Benfica footballer Nélson Semedo was racially insulted in a match at Vitória de Guimarães. He did not leave the pitch and chairs were thrown at him after he reacted to the racial slurs.

In 2020, former Porto footballer Moussa Marega left the pitch after he was subjected to racists insults at Vitória de Guimarães.

In February 2026, the Champions League match between Benfica and Real Madrid was temporarily halted due to alleged racist abuse of Madrid's Vinícius Júnior by Benfica player Gianluca Prestianni. Prestianni denied the allegations, but received a provisional one-match ban, although continued to train with the Benfica team. Later that month, Benfica banned 5 fans for racism. Prestianni later received a six-match ban for homophobic abuse of Vinicius.

=== Republic of Ireland ===
Cyrus Christie revealed that he was subjected to racist abuse whilst on international duty with Republic of Ireland outside the training ground when he first joined up, and also revealed that he was receiving racist abuse after games.

In March 2023, the Irish under-15 national team were subject to racist abuse.

=== Romania ===
The publicized display of portraits of Romania's World War II leader and convicted war criminal Ion Antonescu and racist slogans by football hooligans during Liga I's 2005–2006 season prompted UEFA intervention (see Racism Breaks the Game).

On 15 November 2019, Swedish player Alexander Isak suffered allegedly racist abuse from Romanian fans during a match between the two countries. The match was initially halted, but continued after Isak and the referee consulted on the matter. UEFA investigated and found there had been no racism.

In July 2024, Romania was one of seven countries who were sanctioned by UEFA following racism from their fans during Euro 2024.

In November 2024, Romania were ordered to play their next home match behind closed doors, due to anti-Hungarian racism from fans in a previous match.

=== Russia ===
Cameroonian player André Bikey suffered racist abuse while playing for Lokomotiv Moscow.

Brazilian footballer Antônio Géder of Saturn Moscow was received with monkey chants at Petrovsky Stadium in a match against Zenit Saint Petersburg.

In March 2008, black players of French side Marseille, including André Ayew, Ronald Zubar and Charles Kaboré, were targeted by fans of Zenit Saint Petersburg; Zenit fans were later warned by police in Manchester not to repeat their behaviour ahead of the 2008 UEFA Cup Final. Later on, Zenit coach Dick Advocaat revealed the club's supporters were racist. When they attempted to sign Mathieu Valbuena, a Frenchman, many fans asked "Is he a negro?" Additionally, Serge Branco, who played for Krylia Sovetov Samara, accused Zenit's staff of racism: "Each time I play in St Petersburg I have to listen to racist insults from the stands. Zenit bosses do not do anything about it which makes me think they are racists too."

On 20 August 2010, Peter Odemwingie, a Russian-born Nigerian international, joined English Premier League team West Bromwich Albion. Shortly after signing, photographs showed Lokomotiv Moscow fans celebrating the sale of Odemwingie through the use of racist banners targeted at the player. One banner included the image of a banana and read "Thanks West Brom".

On 12 February 2011, Roberto Carlos signed a contract with Russian Premier League club Anzhi Makhachkala. In March, during a game away at Zenit Saint Petersburg, a banana was held near the player by one of the fans as the footballer was taking part in a flag-raising ceremony. In June, in a match away at Krylia Sovetov Samara, Roberto Carlos received a pass from the goalkeeper and was about to pass it when a banana was thrown onto the pitch, landing nearby. The 38-year-old Brazilian picked it up and threw it by the sidelines, walking off the field before the final whistle and raising two fingers at the stands, indicating this was the second such incident since March.

In December 2012, Zenit fans published a manifesto demanding that the club exclude all non-white and homosexual players from the club's roster. The demands were refused by the club, which released a statement saying that "the team's policy is aimed at development and integration into the world soccer community, and holds no archaic views". Until the summer of 2012, Zenit was the only team in the Russian top flight never to have signed a minority player.

In October 2013, Manchester City midfielder Yaya Touré received racist abuse from opposition fans whilst playing against CSKA Moscow in Russia. The club's stadium was partially closed as punishment. Touré suggested that black players might boycott the 2018 FIFA World Cup, to be held in Russia, if racism continued in the country.

In September 2014, Dynamo Moscow defender Christopher Samba was racially abused playing in the Moscow derby against Torpedo Moscow. As a result, Torpedo were forced to close part of their stadium, although Samba was also banned for two games for swearing at the racist fans.

In a friendly match between Russia and France in Saint Petersburg on 17 April 2018, monkey chants were directed at members of the French team. The noises were picked up by television cameras and reported by photographers at the side of the pitch. As a result, "disciplinary actions have been opened against the Russian Football Union (RFU) for this incident", a FIFA statement read.

In March 2019 Pavel Pogrebnyak was accused of racism after saying it was "laughable" for black players to represent the Russian national team.

=== Serbia ===
In October 2006, 37 Borac Čačak fans were arrested and eight faced criminal charges after racially abusing the club's Zimbabwean player Mike Temwanjera during a first division match. Borac Čačak was at the centre of more controversy in March 2008 when a Ghanaian player, Solomon Opoku, was attacked by fans; six fans were later arrested, with four being later charged.

On 29 November 2006, Hajduk Kula coach Nebojša Vučićević racially insulted Red Star Belgrade's Senegalese defender Ibrahima Gueye. The coach responded to the accusation: "I told my players several times to put pressure on the black guy, I don't see anything wrong with that."

During a match against England's under-21 side, an unnamed Serbian under-21 player was accused of racially abusing the black English defender Justin Hoyte, while the Serbian fans were alleged to have racially abused England's Nigerian-born full-back Nedum Onuoha.

Following racist abuse from Montenegrin club Zeta fans, DaMarcus Beasley, during his stint with Scottish side Rangers, recalled previous instances of racism whilst playing away in Belgrade from fans of Red Star. Red Star, however, has been defended by some of its black players, such as Segundo Castillo and Franklin Salas, with Castillo saying that, "Red Star fans are not racist." Rangers boss Walter Smith stated he had not heard the abuse, having been absorbed in the game.

In 2017, a group of fans at a game between FK Rad and Partizan Belgrade held up a racist banner and directed monkey sounds towards Everton Luiz, a Brazilian player. Efforts to stop the taunts failed and the opposing team joined in the racist actions, leaving Luiz in tears.

In November 2019 Partizan Belgrade manager Savo Milošević said there was no racism problem in Serbia after his team were punished for racist actions by fans.

On 18 February 2021, AC Milan forward Zlatan Ibrahimović was subjected to racist abuse by an individual seated in the VIP box during a Europa League match against Red Star Belgrade.

In June 2024, during the UEFA Euro 2024 tournament in Germany, Serbian fans were accused of racism towards England players.

In July 2024, Serbia was one of seven countries who were sanctioned by UEFA following racism from their fans during Euro 2024.

In June 2026, pundit Rade Bogdanović apologised for making racist remarks about Belgium's black players during the 2026 World Cup.

=== Slovakia ===
On 4 April 2007, football supporters from Slovan Bratislava displayed a banner which contained the words "Alles Gute Adi" and a smiley-head face of Adolf Hitler during a match against Senec; racist chants were also heard. Three days later, on 7 April, Slovan Bratislava fans were responsible for directing monkey chants at Artmedia Bratislava's Karim Guédé.

=== Slovenia ===
In July 2024, Slovenia was one of seven countries who were sanctioned by UEFA following racism from their fans during Euro 2024.

=== Spain ===
In the 1992–93 La Liga season, the Rayo Vallecano goalkeeper Wilfred Agbonavbare was the target of racist abuse from Real Madrid fans, such as chants as Negro, cabrón, recoge el algodón! ("Nigger, motherfucker, go to pick some cotton!") and a middle-aged man from Madrid saying on live TV that "that fucking nigger from Rayo" and the referee Juan Andújar Oliver were to blame for Real Madrid's defeat, much to the amusement of the teenage fans who shouted "Ku Klux Klan". In the same live TV report, a 13-year old Real Madrid fan furiously took the microphone and spat, making a verbal threat to the Nigerian goalkeeper saying "Sunday we'll go to beat to death the nigger, that son of a bitch, in Vallecas". When asked about the abuse suffered, Wilfred stated "That's normal, I am dark-skinned and having made many saves, I expected people to shout at me. But I am a footballer and this is nothing, I am very focused on [playing] my match". The Bukaneros, a far-left ultras group from Rayo Vallecano, dedicated to Wilfred a graffiti with the dedication "For your defense of the Sash against racism, we will not forget you".

Since 1996, after his transfer from Real Madrid to FC Barcelona, many supporter groups of Barcelona's rivals (Ultras Sur being the first) "abused" Luis Enrique (even though he does not have African ancestry himself) with the rhyming chant "Luis Enrique, tu padre es Amunike" (Luis Enrique, your father is Amunike), which referenced the Nigerian striker, who then, was his teammate for the culés. The abuse still carried on such as in 2016, when a man abused Luis Enrique – now as Barcelona's coach – with said chant when the latter was getting out from the bus at El Prat airport a day before the 2016-17 Champions League fourth group stage match against Manchester City F.C.

Aston Villa's Dalian Atkinson returned from Spain after one season with Real Sociedad, unhappy with the reception he received and identifying racial abuse as a major factor in his rapid departure from the Spanish club.

Ivorian midfielder Félix Dja Ettien suffered racial abuse when he first signed for Levante (where he stayed from 1997 to 2008); he was ignored by the coach due to his inability to speak Spanish and whenever he fell ill, he was accused of having malaria or AIDS.

During a training session in 2004, a Spanish TV crew filmed Spain national team head coach Luis Aragonés trying to motivate José Antonio Reyes by making offensive and racist references to Reyes' then-teammate at Arsenal, Thierry Henry. The phrase used was "Demuestra que eres mejor que ese negro de mierda", translated as "Show that you're better than that fucking black guy". The incident caused uproar in the British media, with calls for Aragonés to be sacked. When Spain played England in a friendly match at the Santiago Bernabéu Stadium soon after, on 17 November 2004, the atmosphere was hostile. Whenever black England players touched the ball, a significant proportion of the Spanish crowd began to make monkey chants, in particular to Shaun Wright-Phillips and Ashley Cole. Additionally, when England sang their national anthem before kick-off, Spanish fans also racially chanted English players. Aragonés' remarks were widely blamed by the British press for inciting the incident. After an investigation into the events during the match, UEFA fined the Royal Spanish Football Federation 100,000 CHF (US$87,000) and warned that any future incidents would be punished more severely. The incident even drew reactions from then-Prime Minister of the United Kingdom Tony Blair and Sports Minister Richard Caborn, with the latter making the claim that the behaviour of Spanish fans was 20 or 30 years behind that of their British counterparts. UEFA noted that possible punishments could include suspension from major international tournaments or the closure of Spain home international matches to supporters. On 7 February 2007, Aragonés won an appeal over the offence, with the misdemeanour being downgraded to "conduct which could be considered to be racist".

In February 2005, Samuel Eto'o received racially driven verbal abuse from some Real Zaragoza spectators during a match for Barcelona. The fans began making monkey-like chants whenever Eto'o had possession of the ball and peanuts were hurled onto the pitch. Eto'o threatened to leave the pitch in the middle of the game, but was prevented by the intervention of his teammates and the referee, who rushed to the pitch to calm him down. His black teammate Ronaldinho, who has suffered similar abuses but less intensely, said he was fed-up with the sounds and that if Eto'o had left the pitch, he would have done the same. As Barcelona won 4–1, Eto'o danced like a monkey, saying rival fans were treating him as a monkey. Referee Fernando Carmona Méndez did not mention the incidents in his match report, commenting only that the behaviour of the crowd was "normal". The fans were identified to police by fellow spectators and they were fined and banned from attending sporting events for five months. Eto'o declared in the aftermath that the punishment was insufficient and that La Romareda, Real Zaragoza's stadium, should have been closed for at least one year. However, Eto'o's coach, Frank Rijkaard, told him to concentrate on football and to stop talking about the incident. Eto'o has stated that he does not take his children to football matches due to the prevalent racism and has also suggested that players walk off if they become victims of racism.

Many African footballers have also been victims of racial abuse, such as the Cameroonian Carlos Kameni, who was abused while playing for Espanyol against Atlético Madrid, who were fined €6,000.

In January 2009, the Royal Spanish Football Federation fined Real Madrid approximately US$3,900 after a group of fans made fascist gestures and chanted fascist slogans at a match. Match referee Alfonso Pérez Burrull cited "extremist or radical symbolism", and chants making reference to "the gas chamber."

On 27 April 2014, Barcelona player Dani Alves was targeted by Villarreal fans, who threw a banana at him. Alves picked up the banana, peeled it, and took a bite. Teammate and also Brazilian player Neymar's response, to post a photograph of himself on social media also eating a banana, went viral. Other footballers have also since taken photographs of themselves eating bananas. Cyrille Regis, who had been racially abused while a player in the 1970s and '80s, expressed concern that the viral campaign would detract from the important issues of combating racism in the game. Alves said that whoever threw the banana at him should be publicly shamed, and on 30 April 2014, a man was arrested in connection with the incident. Villarreal were later fined €12,000 for the incident.

In early May 2014, Levante's Papakouli Diop complained of receiving racist abuse from opposition Atlético Madrid fans.

Espanyol banned 12 supporters after they were identified as having subjected Athletic Bilbao player Iñaki Williams to racist abuse in a match in January 2020.

On 4 April 2021, the players of Valencia left the pitch during a La Liga game against Cádiz after their player, Mouctar Diakhaby, was allegedly subjected to racist abuse.

In September 2022, Real Madrid player Vinícius Júnior was criticised on television for dancing whilst celebrating a goal; the player said that criticism, which compared him to a "monkey", was racist. Following this, some fans of Atlético Madrid were accused of singing racist songs about Vinícius, which was condemned by La Liga. Vinícius later said that La Liga did not do anything about racists, a few days after which La Liga announced that they had filed charges against those accused. In February 2023 it was revealed that nobody in Spain "has been sentenced or punished for a racist incident related to football".

In January 2023, Vinícius was targeted when an effigy of him was hung outside Real Madrid's training ground. Three people were initially arrested, and eventually four men were later fined and banned from stadiums for their role.

In February 2023, Vinícius was racially abused by a Mallorca fan, who later received a suspended prison sentence.

In May 2023, Real Madrid's game against Valencia was halted after Vinícius was racially abused. Three people were arrested in connection with the incident, after it was reported to the police as a hate crime. Valencia received a fine and had their south stand closed for 5 games as punishment, which was reduced to 2 games on appeal. The three fans who abused him were later jailed.

Vinícius was also allegedly racially abused by Barcelona fans in October 2023 in an El Clasico match, and by a child at a Valencia game in March 2024. Vinícius had allegedly threatened not to play in the latter game after Real Madrid's social media posted a photo of him kissing the club badge above a logo showing men evolving from monkeys. Following the same game, Valencia player Peter, on loan from Real Madrid, closed his social media accounts after suffering online racist abuse from Real Madrid fans.

In March 2024, Vinícius also suffered racist abuse in a match against Osasuna; Real Madrid complained after the referee did not include the incident in his match report. He later said that the racism he encountered - including 10 incidents in the 2022–23 season - made him feel less like playing the sport. Journalist Marcus Alves later said that Vinícius was "leading football's fight against racism". In November 2024, a minor who admitted racially abusing Vinícius at a Rayo Vallecano game received a ban.

In March 2024, Sevilla players and coaches, including player Marcos Acuna and manager Quique Sanchez Flores, suffered racist abuse in a match against Getafe.

In April 2024, player Cheikh Kane Sarr was banned for two matches after confronting an opposition fan who racially abused him. Sarr later spoke out in support of Vinícius, whilst Jude Bellingham said authorities needed to do more to deal with racism.

Later that month, Barcelona were fined following racist behaviour from fans in a match against Paris-SG, whilst Nico Williams accused Atletico Madrid fans of racially abusing him.

In September 2024, following racism from Barcelona fans in a match against French club Monaco, the club was subject to a ticket ban.

In October 2024, Barcelona player Lamine Yamal was racially abused by Real Madrid fans. The same season, Real Madrid were fined twice by UEFA for racist incidents against Arsenal and Manchester City, receiving a suspended partial stadium closure for the latter incident.

In January 2025, Barcelona player Alejandro Balde was racially abused by Getafe fans.

In February 2025, the match between Espanyol and Athletic Bilbao was paused after Bilbao player Maroan Sannadi after being allegedly racially abused by Espanyol fans.

As of February 2026, Vinicius had been the victim of 20 alleged racist incidents in 8 years. That same month, a Real Madrid fan was arrested after an alleged Nazi salute during a match against Benfica.

In March 2026, a La Liga game between Elche and Espanyol was paused following alleged racist abuse of Espanyol player Omar El Hilali by Elche's Rafa Mir. Later that month, Lamine Yamal condemned racist and Islamophobic chants aimed at the Egypt national team.

Former Spanish Prime Minister Mariano Rajoy said in El Debate that the French national team "does not have any French players" ahead of the Spain vs France match in the 2026 FIFA World Cup. His successor Pedro Sanchez and French government officials and political figures condemned the remarks as racist.

=== Sweden ===
In 2009, fans of Swedish football team IFK Göteborg abused supporters of rivals Malmö FF by referring to them as "Rosengårdstattare" ("Rosengård gypsies"), in a racist reference to the large immigrant population of Malmö. Also, fans of Helsingborgs IF have been known to yell monkey chants at opposing dark-skinned players.

In June 2018, the Swedish National Team posted a YouTube video of player Jimmy Durmaz making a statement against racism in football. Durmaz stated that online he has been called "darkie, bloody Arab, terrorist, Taliban." In the video, Durmaz talks about his family and how they have also been targets of racism. At the end, Durmaz says "vi är eniga, vi är sverige, knulla rasism", which translates to "We are United, We are Sweden, F**k Racism".

=== Switzerland ===
Fwayo Tembo left Basel after he accused club coach Thorsten Fink of making racist remarks towards him during a training session. Fink is reported to have told a collaborator to "get the monkey down from the tree".

=== Turkey ===
On 15 April 2012, Fenerbahçe's Emre Belözoğlu was accused of making racist comments on the pitch towards Trabzonspor's Didier Zokora. After the match, Zokora told Lig TV:

Emre and I came face to face during the match. I'll tell you what he said word for word. He called me: 'A fucking nigger'. This is the first time in my life something like this has happened to me. Emre has Africans like Yobo and Sow as team-mates – I can't understand why he'd say such a thing. We're trying to get on with our jobs. What does the colour of our skin matter? Fans, FIFA, the press are all against racist statements. I hope something like this doesn't go unpunished.

Lip-reading professionals say Belözoğlu has said the words "fucking nigger". Emre received a two-game ban for his actions after it was concluded that he had used abusive, but not racist, language by the authorities. There are still questions about the low ban he received.

On 12 May 2013, before the match between Fenerbahçe and Galatasaray, Galatasaray striker Didier Drogba, along with his Ivorian international teammate Emmanuel Eboué, were racially abused by certain Fenerbahçe fans during the pre-match warmups. They were allegedly shown bananas. Television cameras and some pictures clearly captured a fan waving around a banana, other fans had black trash bags on their heads and were pictured holding the brand of the beverage "Negro". Though there were no monkey chants or gestures of that sort, the "banana" caused a huge controversy and Fenerbahce has been condemned. This was the second ever known racism incident in Turkey, again involving Fenerbahçe following the events that took place between Belözoğlu and Zokora in 2012.

In February 2025, Fenerbahçe manager Jose Mourinho was accused of racism by Galatasaray due to comments made about Turkish referees following a match between the clubs. Mourinho later received a four-match ban for his comments, which was reduced to a two-match ban on appeal. Mourinho also filed a legal claim against Galatasaray.

=== United Kingdom ===
In March 2024, British Asian football fans spoke out about the racism they experience on social media.

==== Scotland ====
Andrew Watson was the first black football player to represent Scotland. Watson never turned professional, however, so Arthur Wharton is sometimes reported as being the first black British footballer.

The book Race, Sport and British Society says there was racist abuse of Celtic player Paul Wilson by Rangers fans in the 1970s: "Rangers fans repeatedly bayed 'Wilson's a Paki' when Celtic played Rangers." There have been reports that some Rangers fans used to sing "I'd rather be a darkie than a Tim", with "Tim" referring to a Celtic fan. The book Sport and National Identity in the Post-War World states, "black players in Scotland were greeted with bananas thrown from the crowd and a barrage of 'monkey grunts', notably Mark Walters of Rangers and Paul Elliott of Celtic." On 2 January 1988, Rangers winger Mark Walters made his debut in the Old Firm derby match at Celtic Park. Rangers lost 2–0 and Walters was subjected to racist abuse from opposing Celtic fans, who were caught on camera chanting like monkeys, throwing fruit (mostly bananas), onto the pitch and dressing in monkey costumes. It was reported that Rangers fans used "implicit racism" on the same day by singing "I'd rather be a darkie than a Tim". Although Celtic denounced the perpetrators, the Scottish Football Association (SFA) remained silent. According to Walters, he experienced worse racial abuse in Edinburgh against Hearts. Following racist abuse aimed at Walters, Rangers banned some of their own season ticket holders. Andrew Smith from The Scotsman newspaper stated, "It is depressing to think that enforcement as much as enlightenment might account for Walters being the only black footballer in this country to have had bananas thrown at them."

Rangers captain Lorenzo Amoruso issued a public apology after a match in December 1999 for making racist comments against Borussia Dortmund's Nigerian striker Victor Ikpeba. In March 2003, Rangers fans were accused of racially abusing Bobo Baldé and Mohammed Sylla. Rangers Chairman John McClelland stated that, "There was such a crescendo during Saturday's match although I thought I heard noises of this kind I can't be 100% sure." In May 2004, Marvin Andrews condemned racism from some Rangers fans.

In November 2004, then-manager of Celtic Martin O'Neill suggested Neil Lennon was the subject of chants of a "racial and sectarian manner".

During a 2007 Scottish Cup tie, St Johnstone player Jason Scotland was the target of racist taunts by a handful of Motherwell fans. The offenders were promptly reprimanded by the spectators around them and were reported to police and match stewards. Motherwell Chairman John Boyle later issued an apology on behalf of the club. Motherwell were to court further controversy on 3 September 2007 when Laryea Kingston of Hearts was abused, although Motherwell refuted the claims.

In October 2009, Rangers player Maurice Edu said he was racially abused by some Rangers fans while leaving Ibrox after a UEFA Champions League defeat by Romanian club Unirea Urziceni. Edu wrote on Twitter, "Not sure what hurt more: result or being racially abused by couple of our own fans as I'm getting in my car."

Three Scottish judges ruled in June 2009 that "The Famine Song" is racist because it targets people of Irish origin. George Peat, president of the SFA, has suggested that the song causes embarrassment for Scottish football and should be stamped out. Peat has also stated that the SFA is determined to contribute to the eradication of offensive songs from Scottish football. In November 2008, a Rangers fan was found guilty of a breach of the peace (aggravated by religious and racial prejudice) for singing "The Famine Song" during a game against Kilmarnock. It was widely reported after an Old Firm game in February 2009, Rangers fans had sung "The Famine Song" at Celtic Park. The Famine Song was also sung in March 2011 at a Scottish football game by Rangers fans, nevertheless, Scottish Justice Secretary Kenny MacAskill described the match as a "great advert for Scottish football". The Herald journalist Doug Gillon has written that "the sectarian intolerance which divides Scottish society [...] is rooted in anti-Irish racism".

In February 2011, in an Old Firm match at Celtic Park, a Celtic supporter was caught mocking black Rangers player El Hadji Diouf with monkey noises and gestures as he was about to take a corner kick.

In April 2011, then-manager of Celtic Neil Lennon received an explosive device in the post. Brian McNally described this as due to "anti-Catholic and anti-Irish racism". A number of high-profile Celtic fans also were sent suspected explosive devices. Leader of the Scottish Conservative Party Annabel Goldie MSP described bullets sent to Neil Lennon and a number of Celtic players as "racism and sectarianism". After an attempted assault on Neil Lennon at Hearts' Tynecastle Stadium, a motion against anti-Irish racism was lodged in the Scottish Parliament.

In October 2014, Celtic player Aleksandar Tonev received a seven-match ban for racially abusing an opponent.

In November 2018 Dennon Lewis spoke out about the racist abuse he has received from his club's (Falkirk's) own fans.

In October 2019 Rangers player Alfredo Morelos was allegedly racially abused by Hearts fans during a match between the two sides. Later that month Celtic manager Neil Lennon described racism in the sport as a "stain" and that players needed to be protected. In February 2020, a 12-year-old boy was charged with racist abuse aimed at Morelos.

Kilmarnock received a letter in December 2020 after a Boxing Day defeat, which contained racist abuse aimed at manager Alex Dyer. In January 2021, Dundee striker Jonathan Afolabi received racist messages following a victory in the Scottish Cup second round, which Dundee "utterly condemn".

During a Europa League game between Rangers and Slavia Prague on 18 March 2021, Rangers manager Steven Gerrard claimed that Glen Kamara was racially abused by Ondřej Kúdela and called for UEFA to take action. However, Slavia Prague denied the accusation of racism, instead stating that Kúdela was assaulted by Kamara. In a related incident, Rangers forward Kemar Roofe was subjected to racist abuse on Instagram after getting sent off during that match.

In October 2021, Dundee United player Jeando Fuchs was allegedly racially abused by a Ross County fan during a match.

In October 2022, Hibernian player Jair Tavares was allegedly racially abused during a match against Dundee United.

In October 2023, Hibernian player Allan Delferriere was allegedly racially abused during a match against Ross County.

St Johnstone player Diallang Jaiyesimi was sent off during a match against Rangers on 20 December 2023, later suffering racist abuse on social media.

In January 2025, Ross County goalkeeper Jordan Amissah was allegedly racially abused in a match away at Aberdeen.

In February 2026, Rangers players Emmanuel Fernandez and Djeidi Gassama suffered racist abuse following a match.

In May 2026, Aberdeen player Jack Milne was accused of racism towards Livingston striker Jeremy Bokila; the allegation was "not proven".

==== Wales ====
On 10 February 2021, Swansea City midfielder Yan Dhanda who is of British Asian background, was racially abused on social media following Swansea's defeat to Manchester City in the FA Cup. The incident was passed to South Wales Police for investigation. On 27 March 2021, following Wales' 1-0 win against Mexico, players Ben Cabango and Rabbi Matondo were subjected to racist abuse on social media. Fellow Wales player, Gareth Bale said he would join a boycott of social media if more could not be done to combat racism across their platforms. Thierry Henry said he is removing himself from social media because of racism and social injustice. On 8 April 2021, Swansea City announced a week-long boycott of all social media platforms by first team members and by the academy and women's teams, staff of the club and from the club's official accounts.

In 2023, Cardiff City player Rohan Luthra was racially abused by teammate Jack Simpson, who later left the club.

In April 2024, fans of Welsh club Merthyr Town, who play in the English league system, were accused of racially abusing an opposition Hungerford Town player.

=== Ukraine ===
In March 2019, English club Chelsea complained about alleged racism aimed at their player Callum Hudson-Odoi during a match against Dynamo Kyiv. Later that month UEFA said they would investigate. He was later offered counselling.

In November 2019 Shakhtar Donetsk player Taison was sent-off after reacting to alleged racist abuse, and was also given a one-match ban.

== Middle East ==
=== Israel ===
Racist incidents date back to at least the 1970s, such as when Arab-Israeli player Jimmy Turk joined Hapoel Tel Aviv. Turk was subjected to anti-Arab abuse during nearly every game he played. According to Itzik Shanan, director of communications at the New Israel Fund, among most racist fans are supporters of Beitar Jerusalem, also Hapoel Tel Aviv fans have been using slogans promoting a Holocaust against Maccabi Tel Aviv. Israeli right-wing football supporters taunt Arab players during games, especially those who play for the mixed Arab-Jewish team Bnei Sakhnin. Ronny Rosenthal, playing for Israel's Maccabi Haifa in 1989, was subjected to anti-Semitic taunts.

Under Israeli law, football fans can be prosecuted for incitement of racial hatred. The "New Voices from the Stadium" program, run by the New Israel Fund (NIF) amasses a "racism index" that is reported to the media on a weekly basis, and teams have been fined and punished for the conduct of their fans. According to Steve Rothman, the NIF San Francisco director, "Things have definitely improved, particularly in sensitizing people to the existence of racism in Israeli society." In 2006, Israel joined Football Against Racism in Europe (FARE), a network set up to counter racism in football.

French police have opened an investigation into possible antisemitic gestures and banners during the 2024 Summer Olympics Group D football match between Israel and Paraguay.

=== Kuwait ===
In June 2023 a friendly match held in Austria between Kuwait U22 and Republic of Ireland U21 was abandoned after an Irish player was apparently racially abused by a Kuwaiti player.

=== Qatar ===
In June 2023 a friendly match held in Austria between Qatar and New Zealand was abandoned after New Zealand player Michael Boxall said he was racially abused by a Qatari player.

=== Syria ===
A scandal took place during the 2018 World Cup qualifiers surrounding the match between Syria and Iran. The match was held in Kuala Lumpur during Monsoon season, making the match much more difficult and ending in a 0-0 tie. Iran then accused Syria of 'fixing' the game to prevent Iran from advancing to the World Cup. This event shows the underlying racial tension between Syria and Iran and exemplifies how racial discrimination works its way into the sport.

== Oceania ==
=== Australia ===
At a 1994 match in Melbourne between the Croatian community supported Melbourne Knights and the Greek community supported South Melbourne, many ethnic slurs were exchanged between the two sets of supporters.

In October 2022 fans of Sydney United 58, a club founded by Croatian immigrants to Australia, allegedly made Ustaše salutes and displayed imagery related to the World War II Croatian fascist regime during the Australia Cup final, and were also caught booing and insulting the Welcome to Country ceremony performed by Indigenous Australians prior to the match. One fan received a lifetime ban.

== Central America ==
=== Guatemala ===
On 1 February 2025, after Antigua drew 0–0 against Marquense, a video of Antigua player Óscar Santis shouting racial slurs towards the fans became viral on social media. He later apologized for the incident.

=== Honduras ===
In July 2021, the German Olympic team walked off the pitch in a friendly match against Honduras due to alleged racist abuse aimed at German player Jordan Torunarigha.

== North America ==
=== Canada ===
After a tackle of Canadian player Moïse Bombito against Lionel Messi in Canada's opening match at the 2024 Copa America, the former was bombarded with offensive comments and monkey imagery online. The Canadian Soccer Association and CONCACAF condemned the incident.

In June 2026, there was a reported rise in racist online abuse during the 2026 World Cup.

=== Mexico ===
In the first day of the Apertura 2006 tournament, fans of Santos Laguna made guttural sounds imitating a chimpanzee against the Panamanian player Felipe Baloy of Monterrey as he scored a goal. During the game, Santos Laguna's fans had also chanted other racial slurs towards Baloy, including "chango" ("monkey") and "come platano" ("banana eater"). The disciplinary commission of the Mexican Football Federation sanctioned the Santos club to a sum equivalent of 5,600 days of league minimum wage for the racist insults.

The racism went past the field in 2014 when Mexican politician, Carlos Trevino, called Brazilian football legend Ronaldinho an ape after he signed with a team in the Mexican league. He was quoted saying "I detest it all the more because people obstruct and flood the main avenues, causing me to spend two hours getting home … and all to see AN APE … A Brazilian, but an ape nonetheless. This has become a ridiculous circus." These outbursts were the reason why the Brazilian legend left the Mexican league after only one season.

In 2022, the Afro-Honduran player Carlos Fernandez decided to retire from Venados FC of the Liga de Expansión MX, citing suffering from acts of racism by a teammate.

In June 2025, Gustavo Cabral was accused of racially abusing Antonio Rudiger in a match at the Club World Cup. FIFA later launched disciplinary proceedings against Cabral.

In June 2026, there was a reported rise in racist online abuse during the 2026 World Cup.

During the 11 June match between South Korea and Czechia, a Mexican fan was filmed making a slit-eyed gesture towards a South Korean fan and Youtuber in the stands. The Mexican fan was later reported to be sacked from his job and apologized to the South Korean fan in question.

=== United States ===
Overt displays of racism at U.S. soccer matches are extremely rare compared to the EU and Russia, in part, because the fan base of soccer in the U.S. is ethnically diverse and much younger. However, during a 24 May 2008 Major League Soccer (MLS) game between the Columbus Crew and the New England Revolution, Revolution forward Kheli Dube (originally from Zimbabwe) scored a goal against the Crew in the 89th minute of the game. An unidentified fan in the audience shouted out a racist slur. The incident was subsequently posted to YouTube, and MLS promised an investigation. In response to the epithet, Revolution player Shalrie Joseph reportedly made an obscene gesture towards the offending fan. Assuming that MLS could have identified the fan, Commissioner Don Garber promised to ban him.

In July 2013, two white coaches for the Los Angeles-based squad Chivas USA filed a discrimination suit against the team. In this suit, they claimed that Chivas (which was controlled by their parent club in Guadalajara had become prejudicial after ending the contracts or trading off non Mexican/Mexican-American players and coaching staff following several unsuccessful seasons, thus they were wrongfully terminated. After the allegations were presented to a wider audience on HBO's Real Sports with Bryant Gumbel, MLS released a statement saying, "MLS has zero tolerance for discrimination or prejudice of any kind....And although allegations in this lawsuit raise serious issues it would not be appropriate for us to say anything more while the litigation is ongoing." Nothing significant happened following the accusations. The club was folded after the 2014 MLS season, eventually being replaced with the unrelated team Los Angeles FC.

On 28 August 2020, MLS and the National Women's Soccer League launched investigations into allegations that Real Salt Lake and Utah Royal FC owner Dell Loy Hansen used racist language in the workplace. In September 2020, La Galaxy II announced that they released defender Omar Ontiveros in the wake of an on-field racist incident with San Diego Loyal player Elijah Martin.

In September 2022, Taxi Fountas was accused of using the n-word towards Damion Lowe.

In April 2023, Dante Vanzeir apologised after being racist towards Jeremy Ebobisse, as did Vanzeir's club and manager.

In June 2023, in the inaugural The Soccer Tournament event, the team representing West Ham United walked off the pitch after alleged racist abuse from an opposition player.

In June 2024, US national team players Folarin Balogun, Chris Richards, Timothy Weah and Weston McKennie all suffered racist abuse after the national team lost in the 2024 Copa América to Panama.

In August 2025, Wayne Rooney spoke about comforting a player who had been racially abused when he was DC United head coach.

In June 2026, there was a reported rise in racist online abuse during the 2026 World Cup.

In July 2026 FIFA is investigating reports that an Argentina fan had insulted American Youtuber IShowSpeed in Spanish, telling him "go cry at the zoo, nigger," during the match between Argentina and Cape Verde on 3 July 2026.

== South America ==
=== Argentina ===
On 14 April 2005, the Quilmes player Leandro Desabato was arrested for racially abusing Grafite, a black Brazilian player. He was held for 40 hours, but no charges were brought against him after Grafite decided not to press charges.

Damián Pérez of Arsenal de Sarandí labelled his opponent Jerry Bengston a "negro de mierda", roughly translated to "black piece of shit". This is a common racial slur in Latin America. One Argentinian narrator, Alberto Raimundi even felt it was appropriate to use the slur when describing an opponent during a post-game interview.

In November 2022, an Argentine television crew during the 2022 FIFA World Cup caught Argentine fans singing chants against the France national football team claiming "they are from Angola", and singled out Kylian Mbappé in particular for his nationality, sexuality, and alleged relationship with transgender model Ines Rau.

In November 2023, Brazilian footballer Rodrygo was racially abused after an altercation during a game with Argentina's Lionel Messi.

In July 2024, the French Football Federation complained about a racist song sung by Argentina national players. The video had been posted on social media by Enzo Fernández, who was criticised by French club-mate Wesley Fofana; Fernández was subject to disciplinary proceedings. Fofana later said that Fernández was not racist. The anti-racism group Kick it Out accused Fernández of being racist and transphobic.

=== Brazil ===
The first club known to have had a Black player was AA Ponte Preta in 1900, Miguel do Carmo. In 1905, in Rio de Janeiro, one of the 11 players on the Bangu AC roster was Black: factory worker Francisco Carregal. In 1907, however, the Liga Metropolitana de Football – the equivalent of the FERJ – published a notice prohibiting "people of color" from participating in football championships. Therefore, Bangu AC chose not to compete in the league that year.

CR Vasco da Gama was the first club to have a Black president, Cândido José de Araújo, in 1905. The 1923 Vasco team that won the league, known as the Camisas Negras, was the first team with a majority Black roster. In 1924, other Rio de Janeiro clubs (America, Botafogo, Flamengo and Fluminense) blocked Vasco's affiliation on the grounds that the club did not have its own stadium (none of them did), that its players had "dubious professions", and that Vasco needed to exclude 12 of its players. Vasco responded with a letter, the famous Resposta História (Historical Response) in which it defended its players and demonstrated its willingness to fight against racism, marking a milestone in the history of the fight against racism in football and in the history of Brazil. To put an end to any demands, Vasco built its own stadium, São Januário, which was considered by fans, journalists, professors, and politicians as a symbol of struggle and resistance against racism.

Racism in Brazilian football was discussed by the media in the run-up to the 2014 FIFA World Cup, held in the country.

In September 2014, Grêmio were banned from competing in the Copa do Brasil after some of their fans were seen racially abusing an opposition player.

In June 2023, the Brazil national team wore an all-black kit as part of an anti-racism campaign.

In July 2023, an anti-racism law in Rio de Janeiro was named after Vinícius Júnior, who had been racially abused in Spain.

In December 2024, four female players from River Plate's women's team were arrested in Brazil after player Candela Díaz was alleged to have imitated monkey gestures against a Gremio ball boy. In a play against Gremio's women's team, the latter's players walked out in protest, and a heated exchange occurred, including more racial slurs against the Gremio players. The game was eventually forfeited and the win was awarded to Gremio.

=== Bolivia ===
In Wilstermann 0-2 loss to Blooming in March 2019, black Brazilian players Serginho, playing for the former team, left the field after being subjected to monkey chants by the opposition fans. Afterwards Serginho stated that racism must end in the Bolivian league.

=== Chile ===
Emilio Rentería, of Colombian-Venezuelan origin was forced off the field crying due to extreme racial abuse during a game played in the Chilean league. After scoring a goal against the opposing team, Renteria celebrated on the side of the pitch. After this the crowd began to chant numerous racist slurs forcing him to leave the game. Chilean senator later apologized to Renteria and made a joint effort to grow awareness for the problem in Chile.

=== Ecuador ===
In the 2006 World Cup held in Germany, The Ecuadorian team was the target of racism by an Argentinian commentator. The commentator was said to have commented on the color of the mainly Afro-Ecuadorian squad, later saying that team were not real Ecuadorians, and were from Nigeria. His comments started an uproar in Ecuador over national identity.

=== Paraguay ===
Club Olimpia fans have been caught on camera uttering the word "monkey" at opposing Brazilian players Gabriel Barbosa and Gabriel Batista at a Copa Liberatadores quarterfinals match against Flamengo in 2021. Olimpia has been fined for the incident.

Shortly before Paraguay's round of 16 match against France in the 2026 FIFA World Cup, former Paraguayan goalkeeper José Luis Chilavert said that Paraguay will face "a squad from Africa" when playing France. Philippe Diallo, the French Football Federation president, denounced the remarks as racist. French player Kylian Mbappe later criticized racist comments made by Paraguayan politician Celeste Amarilla directed at him as "despicable" and "not worthy of her position"; Amarilla described Mbappe as "an illiterate brute, a Cameroonian pretending to be French, and educated by chimpanzees".

=== Peru ===
Jhoel Herrera a player for Real Garcilaso of the Peruvian first division brought family to his opponent's home stadium to celebrate mother's day. Herrera endured 90 minutes of racist verbal abuse from the opposing fans and players while the ref seemed to not react. At the end of the game, Herrera's mother was caught on tape being physically abused by the racist opposing team's fans.

Universitario of Lima insulted the fans and players of Corinthians (Brazil) by making monkey gestures in match of the Conmebol Copa Sudamericana in 2023, and against Botafogo in a match of the Conmebol Copa Libertadores in 2024. Universitario is not new in racist displayings, Universitario fans and Jean Ferrari while playing for Sporting Cristal in 2001 made monkey gestures against Alianza Lima fans, he continuously made fun of Black players and supporters of Alianza Lima (a club known as the antiracist club).

=== Uruguay ===
In June 2024, Uruguayan player Rodrigo Bentancur apologised for saying all Korean people looked the same whilst talking about Tottenham teammate Son Heung-min. Bentancur was later charged by the English Football Association for his comments, receiving a 7-match ban and a £100,000 fine. Tottenham appealed the ban, whilst manager Ange Postecoglou defended Bentancur, desiring the incident as a "mistake". The appeal was unsuccessful. The BBC stated that the incident was an example of increasing racism against East and South East Asians in football.

== See also ==
- Football Against Racism in Europe
- Judenklub
- Racism Breaks the Game
- Serbia v Albania (UEFA Euro 2016 qualifying)
- Show Racism the Red Card
- Stand Up Speak Up
- Child abuse in football
