= Racism in sport =

Racism in sports manifests as a form of discrimination and violence based on athletes' ethnic origin, skin color, or religion, affecting both professional leagues and youth development levels. The Australian Human Rights and Equal Opportunity Commission (HREOC) released a report in 2007 stating that racial abuse and vilification are commonplace in Australian sport.

== By Sport ==
=== Association football ===
Racism has a long history in association football, and has prompted a response from numerous political and footballing organisations. (Donkey) The topic of racism in association football has been widely covered by the media as well as academic studies. Scholars have described an "invisible centrality of whiteness" that permeates the upper levels of football in Europe. Non-white football players in Europe are frequently stereotyped in a racialised manner. In response to these incidents, numerous anti-racism organisations have been formed, including Show Racism the Red Card, established in 1996. Other organisations include Football Against Racism in Europe and Racism Breaks the Game.

On January 3, 2013, Italian football club Pro Patria supporters made racist comments during a match against AC Milan. Ghanaian footballer Kevin-Prince Boateng was consistently racially abused during the match:

“When Boateng touched the ball for the first time, a small part of the crowd made monkey noises: Oo -- oo -- oo -- oo...Fifty or so people called him an animal. He locked eyes with them and could see the hate. He pointed to his head, to say, 'You're an idiot.' The chants went on for 20 minutes: Oo -- oo -- oo -- oo...Finally, after about twenty more minutes of the chanting, Boateng picked up the ball, kicked it into the stands and walked off the field. The team then boarded its bus and headed back to the AC Milan compound. "

During a Euro 2020 qualifier match between England and Bulgaria, the match was stopped twice after Bulgarian fans shouted racist chants at the English players, with four fans being arrested after the match. Racist incidents in 2018 rose by 67% in professional games, a sharp increase compared to other types of discrimination. Discrimination is especially targeted at referees of colour by players sent off due to bad conduct. Joel Mannix, a referee, recalls one instance of another referee telling him:

"I'm just refereeing a game. I may have got it wrong, I may not have got it wrong, but is there any reason to act like that?"

Josh Magennis, a striker for the Northern Ireland team, has called for a "paper trail" for football tickets after several instances of racism from fans while playing football at a professional level.

=== Rugby ===
==== Argentina ====
The England national rugby union team's black players have been subjected to racial abuse from Argentine spectators during a Test match in San Juan, Argentina.

==== Australia ====
Anthony Mundine, a rugby league player, claimed that New South Wales was so racist that he quit rugby and took up boxing. He believed that due to his race, he was never truly appreciated for his talents in the league, being forced to sit out and play different positions, despite proving himself to be among the most talented in the league. Even as a professional boxer, Mundine still feels that there is racism in Australian sports, and he decided to sit during the national anthem before his fight against Danny Green on February 3, 2017. He believes that the national anthem is not representative of the black people, who are still being oppressed in Australia, and did not acknowledge it.

- News.com.au reports that television commentator and former rugby league great Andrew Johns had been banned for allegedly calling Greg Inglis a "black c**t" while addressing the New South Wales rugby league team. Additionally, it was alleged that Johns had referred to Timana Tahu as a "black c**t", "abo", "c**n", "n****r" and "monkey".

==== Italy ====
The Italian club Benetton Treviso suspended a player after Cherif Traorè, a black Italian member of the team, received a banana as a joke "Christmas gift" and other players laughed when Troare opened the gift.

=== Professional baseball ===
==== Black leagues ====
As sports progressed, race relations progressed at a comparable rate. In baseball for instance, African Americans were barred from participation in the National Association of Baseball Players because of regional prejudice and unofficial color bans dating back to the 1890s. Due to this segregation, blacks worked together to create the Negro leagues. These leagues comprised mostly all African-American teams. As a whole, the Negro leagues became one of the largest and most successful enterprises run mainly by African Americans.

==== Jackie Robinson ====
Jackie Robinson was born in Cairo, Georgia in 1919 and was the youngest of five children. At an early age, his father deserted the family and his mother, Mallie Robinson, decided to move the family to Pasadena in California. Here, Robinson began to excel at many sports, especially baseball. Jackie Robinson is arguably one of the most historically significant professional baseball players in Major League Baseball, next to Babe Ruth during their era. Jackie Robinson constantly faced discrimination throughout his entire life but would overcome the discrimination when he made his way into Major League Baseball.

After serving in the military, Robinson joined the Kansas City Monarchs of the American Negro Leagues and excelled with elite fielding and a batting average above .300. Although he was playing well, he did not like competing in a racially segregated league that was put in place by the Jim Crow laws. Branch Rickey, president of the Brooklyn Dodgers, signed Robinson to the Montreal Royals in 1946, which was an all-white minor league team. He faced much adversity with racist comments from his own team members and especially during away games where opposing white players would spit, hit, and slide into him with sharp metal cleats.

Despite this adversity, Robinson led the International League in both batting average (.349) and fielding percentage (.985) and was called up to play for the Brooklyn Dodgers. He played his first game on April 15, 1947, becoming the first African-American man to ever play professional baseball. The harassment in the Major Leagues only got worse with multiple opposing team's managers and players yelling derogatory terms and trying to inflict any harm possible. Robinson went on to have a successful baseball career, being inducted into the Major League Baseball Hall of Fame and having his jersey number retired.

=== Golf ===
==== Tiger Woods ====
Only a minority of players, such as Tiger Woods, have dominated professional golf. Woods is of African American and Asian-American descent. With 83 percent of golf participants being white, a white majority dominates golf. Woods has the second most major wins of any individual in golf history, with 15. His excellence was well recognised as he became one of the most marketable players in the world. Woods helped tear down the imposing racial discrepancies in golf by not only competing with golf's current best but also by challenging other accomplished golfers for being the best of all time. In 1997, he became the first black player to win a Men's major golf championship at just 21 years of age. After winning the 1997 Masters Tournament, Woods faced ridicule from Fuzzy Zoeller, who won this championship in 1979. Zoeller responded to Woods' win by stating, "That little boy is driving well and he's putting well. He's doing everything it takes to win. So you know what you guys do when he gets in here. You pat him on the back and say congratulations and enjoy it and tell him not to serve fried chicken next year. Got it." Zoeller says his comments were misconstrued, and later apologised.

In 2011 Woods' former caddie Steve Williams described him as a "black arse", which sparked much controversy over the racial dynamic between Woods and the world of golf. His comments opened a debate on the racial tensions present in golf. Williams described his comments as "stupid" and not racist, and later apologized.

Broadcaster Kelly Tilghman was suspended from The Golf Channel after joking about Tiger Woods being "lynched in a back alley" during final round coverage of the Mercedes-Benz Championship.

=== Basketball ===
In the 1940s through '60s, many NBA teams had unofficial quotas on the number of Black players on their teams. Many players joined other professional leagues, including the Eastern Professional Basketball League. The Eastern Professional Basketball League (1946–78) was fast and physical, often played in tiny, smoke-filled gyms across the northeast and featuring the best players who just couldn’t make the NBA—many because of the quotas.

==== Donald Sterling ====
Donald Sterling was the previous owner of the Los Angeles Clippers, who was banned from the NBA for life for racially insensitive remarks he made about African-Americans. After seeing a picture that his then-girlfriend, V. Stiviano, posted with Magic Johnson, Sterling was recorded saying:

"It bothers me a lot that you want to broadcast that you're associating with black people. Do you have to? ... You can sleep with them [black people]. You can bring them in, you can do whatever you want. The little I ask you is not to promote it on that...and not to bring them to my games."

These remarks outraged his players and coach Doc Rivers (who is African-American), who threatened to boycott games and called for Sterling to be removed as owner. Despite the remarks, players kept striving to advance in the playoffs. The NBA commissioner, Adam Silver, and the NBA Board of Governors officially approved the sale of the Clippers to Microsoft CEO Steve Ballmer for $2 billion, and effectively banned Sterling from the NBA for life.

==== Philippines ====
After a loss to Iran in the 2013 FIBA Asia Championship, several of the Philippine national basketball team's fans made messages in Facebook ridiculing the Iranian team as 'foul-smelling'.

A utility staff from the Cagayan Valley Rising Suns of the PBA Developmental League was reprimanded for heckling Nigerian NLEX Road Warriors player Olaide “Ola” Adeogun with monkey chanting and repeatedly calling him 'monkey' several times.

=== Mixed martial arts ===
Fighters such as Maurice Smith and Kevin Randleman were amongst the first black champions in MMA, but neither have received the media attention that fighters of other races have.

Joe Rogan of the UFC has suggested that Jon Jones, a UFC light heavyweight champion, is not as popular as he could be due in large part to racism.

=== Cricket ===
- 2006: Former Australian cricketer and commentary Dean Jones called South African cricketer Hashim Amla a "terrorist" on 7 August 2006. When Amla, who is a Muslim with a full beard, took a catch, Jones was heard to say "the terrorist gets another wicket". Jones made the comment during a commercial break, but the comment went to air live in South Africa as its broadcast had not been interrupted. Jones was fired as a commentator, and later apologized to all concerned.
- 2007: South African player Herschelle Gibbs was banned for two Tests when a stump mic captures him saying to the crowd "You fucking bunch of fucking animals, fucking go back to the zoo, fucking Pakistanis."
- 2008: Indian player Harbhajan Singh reportedly called Australian cricketer Andrew Symonds a "monkey".
- 2015: An Australian cricketer referred to English player Moeen Ali as "Osama", presumably in reference to Osama bin Laden.
- 2015: English cricketer Craig Overton reportedly told Pakistani cricketer Ashar Zaidi (playing for Sussex at the time) was told to "get back to own country".
- 2015: Zimbabwe player Mark Vermeulen was banned for a racist post on social media.
- 2019: Pakistani player Sarfaraz Ahmed was banned for four matches for racist comments to Andile Phehlukwayo.
- 2019: A spectator in New Zealand allegedly directed racist remarks at English player Jofra Archer.
- January 2021: Australian spectators allegedly directed racist remarks at two Indian cricketers Jasprit Bumrah and Mohammed Siraj during the third test of India against Australia in Sydney.
- August 2021: English spectators allegedly shouted racist comments at the Indian cricket team and its supporters during the second day of a test match between England and India at Trent Bridge, Nottingham. The spectators allegedly referred to Indian cricketers Virat Kohli and Mohammed Shami as "Wanker Kohli" and "Shitty Shami" respectively, in addition to shouting "Delta" at supporters of the Indian cricket team, in reference to the Delta variant of SARS‑CoV‑2, which originated in India.
- June 2023: The Independent Commission for Equity in Cricket found racism throughout English and Welsh cricket.

=== Motorsport ===
==== Lewis Hamilton ====
Lewis Hamilton became Formula One's first black driver when he made his debut in the 2007 Formula One season in the McLaren team, scoring a podium on his maiden race at the season-opening Australian Grand Prix before taking his first pole and win at Canada, just only his sixth race entry. During the course of the season, he had developed a rivalry with team-mate and double world champion Fernando Alonso, resulting in him being the target of racist abuse from Spanish fans. However, both Hamilton and Alonso lost against Kimi Räikkönen. During pre-season testing in the 2008 Formula One season, several Spanish fans were seen dressed in black, with shirts bearing the words "Hamilton's family [sic]" and made racist chants. This prompted the FIA to launch the "Race against Racism" campaign. Shortly before the season-ending Brazilian Grand Prix (Hamilton would dramatically claim his first championship title in 5th place), a website owned by the Spanish branch of the New York-based advertising agency TBWA and named "pinchalaruedadeHamilton", which translates as 'burst Hamilton's tires', surfaced in media. The website, which has since deleted, allowed users to leave spiked items on a map of the Interlagos circuit, with a number of insulting messages left on the page.

In the following years, Hamilton continued to score victories and world championship titles only to lose against his team-mate Nico Rosberg in 2016 and his rival Max Verstappen in 2021. He has however criticized the lack of diversity in the sport, saying "nothing has changed". Hamilton has criticized the industry on the silence over the murder of George Floyd, and has since launched his own commission to promote diversity, with Formula One launching the #WeRaceAsOne initiative to curb racism. Former Formula One Group chairman Bernie Ecclestone came under criticism from Hamilton and the Formula One community for racial statements.

==== NASCAR ====
A number of black drivers have been involved in NASCAR, with Wendell Scott being inducted to the NASCAR Hall of Fame in 2015. Following the Black Lives Matter movement, and a call from driver Bubba Wallace, NASCAR banned Confederate flags entirely at all of their events. An incident occurred during the 2020 GEICO 500 weekend at the Talladega Superspeedway where a noose was discovered in Wallace's garage. An FBI investigation was launched and later concluded that it was not a noose, it was a handle to pull the garage door down that existed long before Wallace was assigned that garage for the weekend, and that Wallace was not in fact a victim of hate crime.

== Racism in college athletics ==
=== College football ===
Despite universities making strides to diversify their student bodies, racism has had an effect on universities' athletics. According to Charles T Clotfelter, "No bigger issue has faced the United States during the reign of big-time college sports than the blot of racial segregation and discrimination." As college sports have gained notoriety, the national attention towards this issue has increased. Clotfelter continues his analysis of equality in collegiate sports by stating that the "Brown v Board of Education decision of 1954 set the stage for an epic confrontation between... the South's devotion to college football and its cultural commitment to Jim Crow laws". With a significant portion of the South's football players being African-American, tensions between the players and the southern atmosphere became readily apparent. In terms of the South maintaining a sense of authority over blacks, in the year 20 "92.5 percent of university presidents in the FBS were white, 87.5 percent of the athletic directors were white and 100 percent of the conference commissioners were white". In comparison, "roughly 31 percent of position coaches are black and 12 percent of coordinators were black. Out of the players in the FBS, roughly 54 percent are black". Whereas the NFL has implemented the Rooney Rule in order to create opportunities for minority coaches, college football has no such rule in place. However, over time racial cohesion in sports has improved, as Clotfelter states that there has been a "realisation that future success would require integrated teams".

One of the most notable events involved the 1956 Sugar Bowl. The game was played shortly after the Rosa Parks event and much controversy preceded the game. Segregationists tried to keep Pitt fullback/linebacker Bobby Grier from playing because he was black. Georgia’s governor publicly threatened the Georgia Tech’s president Blake R. Van Leer to cancel the game. Ultimately, Bobby Grier played making this the first integrated Sugar Bowl and is regarded as the first integrated bowl game in the Deep South.

==== Ernie Davis ====
Ernie Davis was the first African-American to win the Heisman Trophy Award, and was an exceptional college football player. He was a three-sport athlete in high school, but excelled at football above all. He was heavily recruited by many elite college football programs, but the NFL legend Jim Brown convinced Davis to attend Syracuse University as it would be a welcoming place for a young black athlete in 1959. Many college sports teams at that time were resisting full-fledged integration, and Davis liked that Syracuse head football coach, Ben Schwartzwalder, was so welcoming to African-American players.

In his final season, Davis ran for 823 yards and capped off his college career becoming the first ever African-American to win the coveted Heisman Trophy. In 1962, Davis was the first African-American to be selected first overall in the NFL Draft by the Washington Redskins, and was immediately traded to the Cleveland Browns.

As an African-American playing a lot of college football in the South, Davis faced racism on multiple occasions. One such instance was after 1960 Cotton Bowl in 1960. Syracuse had defeated Texas 23-14, and Davis had an amazing game and earned MVP honors. Davis was told that he would be allowed to accept the award at the post-game banquet, but that he and other black teammates would have to leave the segregated facility shortly after. The whole team wanted to leave and boycott the event, but Syracuse officials made the rest of the team stay in order to not cause a scene.

Shortly after being drafted, Davis was diagnosed with leukaemia and died on May 18, 1963, not having played a game in the NFL.

=== College basketball ===
==== Texas Western ====
In 1966, Don Haskins led a Texas Western basketball team to a 23-1 and record, culminating in a national championship. The team was made up of many African-American players, and throughout the regular season faced racism when playing many of their games in the South, As depicted in Haskins' book Glory Road, one such event occurred when, during an away game, many of the black players had their hotel rooms broken into and vandalized, with racist remarks painted on the walls.

Haskins made history when he started the first all-black lineup on March 19, 1966, against the University of Kentucky in the national championship game. The Miners defeated Adolph Rupp's all-white, top-ranked team. After this historic year in college basketball, teams began to recruit more and more African-American athletes, and college basketball became more integrated.

==== Patrick Ewing incident ====
In 1983, Georgetown University star centre Patrick Ewing was subjected to racist abuse during a game. A banana peel was thrown towards him on the court during play, and signs reading "Ewing is an Ape" and "Ewing Kant Read Dis" were held. University President Rev. Timothy S. Healy described the actions as "cheap, racist stuff".

==== Don Imus ====
Radio talk show host Don Imus was suspended for two weeks, then fired by CBS after allegedly making racially disparaging comments about the Rutgers women's basketball team. This incident occurred on April 11, 2007, with Imus calling the team "nappy headed-hoes" the day following the team losing in the NCAA Women's National Championship game against the University of Tennessee.

Both teams were predominately Black, and "nappy" is an often pejorative term used to refer to Black hair styles and texture. Imus apologized, citing his lack of racism and the girls' unfamiliarity with his broadcasts.

== Racism in international events ==
=== 1936 Summer Olympics ===
From the start of the 1936 Olympics, there was an opposition to the Olympic Games being held in Germany; "neither Americans nor the representatives of other countries can take part in the Games in Nazi Germany without at least acquiescing in the contempt of the Nazis for fair play and their sordid exploitation of the Games". Despite this resentment, the Olympic Games continued.

The bidding for the 1936 Olympic Games was the first to be contested by IOC members, who cast their votes for their favorite host city. The vote occurred in 1931 during the Weimar Republic era, before Adolf Hitler rose to power in 1933. By allowing only members of the "Aryan race" to compete for Nazi-controlled Germany, Hitler further promoted his ideological belief of racial supremacy.

Other nations debated boycotting, however none ended up acting on their plans. The Amateur Athletic Union led newspaper editors and anti-Nazi groups to protest against American participation, contesting that racial discrimination was a violation of Olympic rules and creed and that participation in the Games was tantamount to support for the Third Reich. Most African-American newspapers supported participation in the Olympics. The Philadelphia Tribune and the Chicago Defender both agreed that black victories would undermine Nazi views of Aryan supremacy and spark renewed African-American pride. American Jewish organizations, meanwhile, largely opposed the Olympics. The American Jewish Congress and the Jewish Labor Committee staged rallies and supported the boycott of German goods to show their disdain for American participation. The 1936 Summer Olympics ultimately boasted the largest number of participating nations of any Olympics to that point. However, some individual athletes, including Jewish Americans Milton Green and Norman Cahners, chose to boycott the Games.

During these Olympics, Margaret Bergmann Lambert was excluded in the 1936 German Olympic team because she was Jewish. She had to withhold her anger and frustration in regard to Hitler's unequal and unfair ruling in Germany. Even though Lambert had equalled the German national record in the high jump a month before the Olympic Games, she was denied the opportunity to participate in the games. In addition, the Nazi Press described African Americans as "black auxiliaries" and eventually called for their exclusion from the Olympics. Also, Hitler's Nazis created rules and restrictions within Germany that prohibited Jews from being able to use local facilities and playgrounds for appropriate training, occurring as early as March 1933. This gave Jews and other "non-Aryan" people unequal training methods.

Great achievements by African Americans, such as Jesse Owens, challenged the "Aryan" ideal, or a Caucasian person without Jewish descent. Owens won four gold medals: one in 100 meters, 200 meters, long jump, and 4x100 meter relay. His achievements conveyed both the notions of "interracial education" as well as "muscular assimilation" to help promote sportsmanship towards African-Americans on and on the Olympic stage. However, these achievements of interracial awareness and racial cohesion also solidified traditional social hierarchies through the guise of "scientific" discoveries in physiology and anatomy.

Additionally, these achievements were met with much speculation and criticism. Since the games, there has existed speculation of Hitler's unwillingness to shake hands with African-American gold medalists. From reports that Hitler had purposefully avoided acknowledging his victories, and had refused to shake his hand, Owens said at the time:

Hitler had a certain time to come to the stadium and a certain time to leave. It happened he had to leave before the victory ceremony after the 100 meters. But before he left I was on my way to a broadcast and passed near his box. He waved at me and I waved back. I think it was bad taste to criticise the 'man of the hour' in another country.

This racism was not limited to Germans, as Americans expressed racist sentiments as well. U.S. track and field coach Dean Cromwell stated "It was not long ago that his [the black athlete's] ability to sprint and jump was a life-and-death matter to him in the jungle. His muscles are pliable, and his easy-going disposition is a valuable aid to the mental and physical relaxation that a runner and jumper must have." These thoughts percolated throughout the Olympics and made discrimination commonplace in many aspects of the games.

- American sprinters Sam Stoller and Marty Glickman were pulled from the 4 × 100 relay team the day before the competition, leading to speculation that U.S. Olympic Committee did not want to add to the embarrassment of Hitler by having two Jews win gold medals.
- Hitler called for a rematch of the quarterfinals match to discount Peru's 4–2 win over Austria. The Peruvian national Olympic team refused to play the match again and withdrew from the games.
- During the games, the Nazis demoted Captain Wolfgang Fürstner, the half-Jewish commandant of the Olympic Village, and replaced him with Werner von Gilsa. After the games' conclusion, Fürstner, a career officer, committed suicide when he learned that the Nuremberg Laws classified him as a Jew, and, as such, he was to be expelled from the Wehrmacht.

== See also ==
- Racism in sport in Australia
- Banana#Racial signifier
