= Fares (disambiguation) =

Fares is the plural of fare, a transportation fee paid by a passenger. It may also refer to:

- Fares (name), a list of people with the given name or surname, including people named Farès
- Fares (village), a village in Greece

== See also ==
- Faires (disambiguation)
- Fairs (disambiguation)
- Faris (disambiguation)
- Aïn Fares (disambiguation), several places in Algeria
- Fares-Maathodaa, an island in the Maldives
