= Faire =

Faire may refer to:

- Laissez-faire, a French phrase meaning "let do, let go, let pass"
- Laissez Faire Books, libertarian bookseller
- Maker Faire, event created by Make magazine
- Heloise and the Savoir Faire, pop music group
- How Weird Street Faire, street fair and electronic music festival in San Francisco
- Savoir-Faire, a piece of interactive fiction written by Emily Short
- Scènes à faire, a principle in copyright law
- Science Faire, a compilation album by pop group The Apples in Stereo
- Vintage Faire Mall, a shopping mall in Modesto, California
- Virginia Brown Faire (1904–1980), American silent-film actress
- West Coast Computer Faire (1977–1989), computer industry conference

== See also ==
- Fair (disambiguation)
- Fare (disambiguation)
- Renaissance fair (disambiguation)
- List of Renaissance fairs
