= Monkey chanting =

Imitating monkey sounds to intimidate black people

Monkey chanting is the making of calls aimed at ridiculing or denigrating Black sportspeople, usually footballers, who play in majority-White countries. The chants are intended to imitate the noises of monkeys or apes, and may be accompanied by gestures in imitation of the scratching of the armpits commonly seen amongst ape species. The chants are expressive of the ethnic slurs "macaca" and "monkey" against people of sub-Saharan African heritage.

Monkey chants may also be accompanied by throwing so-called "monkey food" (peanuts, bananas, or banana skins) at black players or onto the sports field.

A number of incidents of this kind have been noted by media as manifestations of racism in association football and racism in cricket.

== See also ==
- List of 2018 FIFA World Cup controversies
- Indian cricket team in Australia in 2007–08#Controversies
