= Stand Up Speak Up =

Campaign against racism in football

Stand Up Speak Up wristband

Stand Up Speak Up was a Europe-wide campaign that was launched in January 2005 by the French football player Thierry Henry following an increase in reports of racist incidents in football across Europe. The campaign started when the former Spanish footballer Luis Aragonés, at this time coach of Spain national team, said these words towards his player and Henry's Arsenal teammate, José Antonio Reyes: "You will show this black shit (Thierry Henry) that you´re better than him". It led to Nike creating the "Stand Up Speak Up" campaign. Together with Nike and other top European players like Rio Ferdinand and Carles Puyol, the protests against this continuing problem inviting football fans to voice their opposition to racism.

The symbol of the campaign is two interlocked wristbands, one black, and one white. About five million of these wristbands have been sold all over Europe. The wrist bands are no longer being sold and there is no intention to reproduce them, but they are still available on the internet. All the funds raised are passed on to a central Stand Up Speak Up fund that will look to support initiatives that aim to combat racism in football through a variety of programs and initiatives. This successful campaign included footballers such as Wayne Rooney, Ronaldinho, Cristiano Ronaldo and Adriano. Stand Up Speak Up claimed at the end in 2009 more than $6.5 million and spent them to 238 projects.

Controversy sparked when Gary Neville claimed Nike was only involved for commercial gain and not their anti-racism stance. This carried over into a match against Arsenal as Neville and Manchester United team mate Paul Scholes refused to wear the different anti-racism tracksuit top that players from both sides wore.
