= Racism Breaks the Game =

2006 anti-racism campaign in Romania

Racism Breaks the Game logo

Racism Breaks the Game (Romanian: Rasismul strică fotbalul; Romani: O Rasismo Rimol o Khel) was a three-day campaign in Romania designed to combat racism in association football, particularly against the Romani minority, as well as to "stimulate social dialogue and promote tolerance and fair-play through football". The campaign, which took place between October 27 and 29, 2006, was a joint effort between the Romanian Football Federation, the National Council for Combating Discrimination, the Open Society Institute in Romania, the Romanian Agency for Press Monitoring and the European Roma Grassroots Organisation.

Racism Breaks the Game was organised as part of the pan-European Week Against Racism in Football as a whole, an initiative of the Football Against Racism in Europe organisation. It was also part of the Decade of Roma Inclusion, a ten-year initiative to improve the situation of the Roma people in eight European countries.

== Activities ==
Several activities and events were held as part of the Racism Breaks the Game campaign. For example, a Football Cup against Racism was organised between the teams in Romania's Liga 1 (premier league). The tournament consisted of nine games, and all players and referees wore T-shirts with the campaign slogan Rasismul strică fotbalul, which was also displayed on banners at the stadiums. The matches were televised alongside a short discussion about the nature of racism in sport and reached an estimated audience of 2.3 million viewers. Approximately 130,000 people also watched the matches live.

Additionally, a football tournament titled "Football Against Racism" was held for children under 16 years of age, which involved approximately 200,000 people, including players from Bucharest's best-known children's teams. This event was featured in Gazeta Sporturilor, Romania's largest sports publication, whose front page included a photograph of a young Romani player, as well as of famous black players and their contribution to football. The campaign also received broad coverage in Romania's media.
