= Pharis =

Pharis may refer to:

- Pharis (mythology), a character in Greek mythology
- Pharis (horse) (1936–1957), a French thoroughbred horse
- Pharis (Laconia), an ancient city in Greece
- Pharis, a surname
  - Billy Pharis, American basketball player
  - Mark Pharis, American artist
- Pharis and Jason Romero, Canadian musicians
