= Renaissance fair (disambiguation) =

A Renaissance fair is a festival in the Renaissance historical style.

Renaissance fair may also refer to:

- "Renaissance Fair", a song by The Byrds from the 1967 album Younger Than Yesterday
- "Renaissance Faire", a song by Blackmore's Night from the 1997 album Shadow of the Moon

== See also ==
- List of Renaissance and Medieval fairs
