= Fariš =

Fariš Фариш
- Village
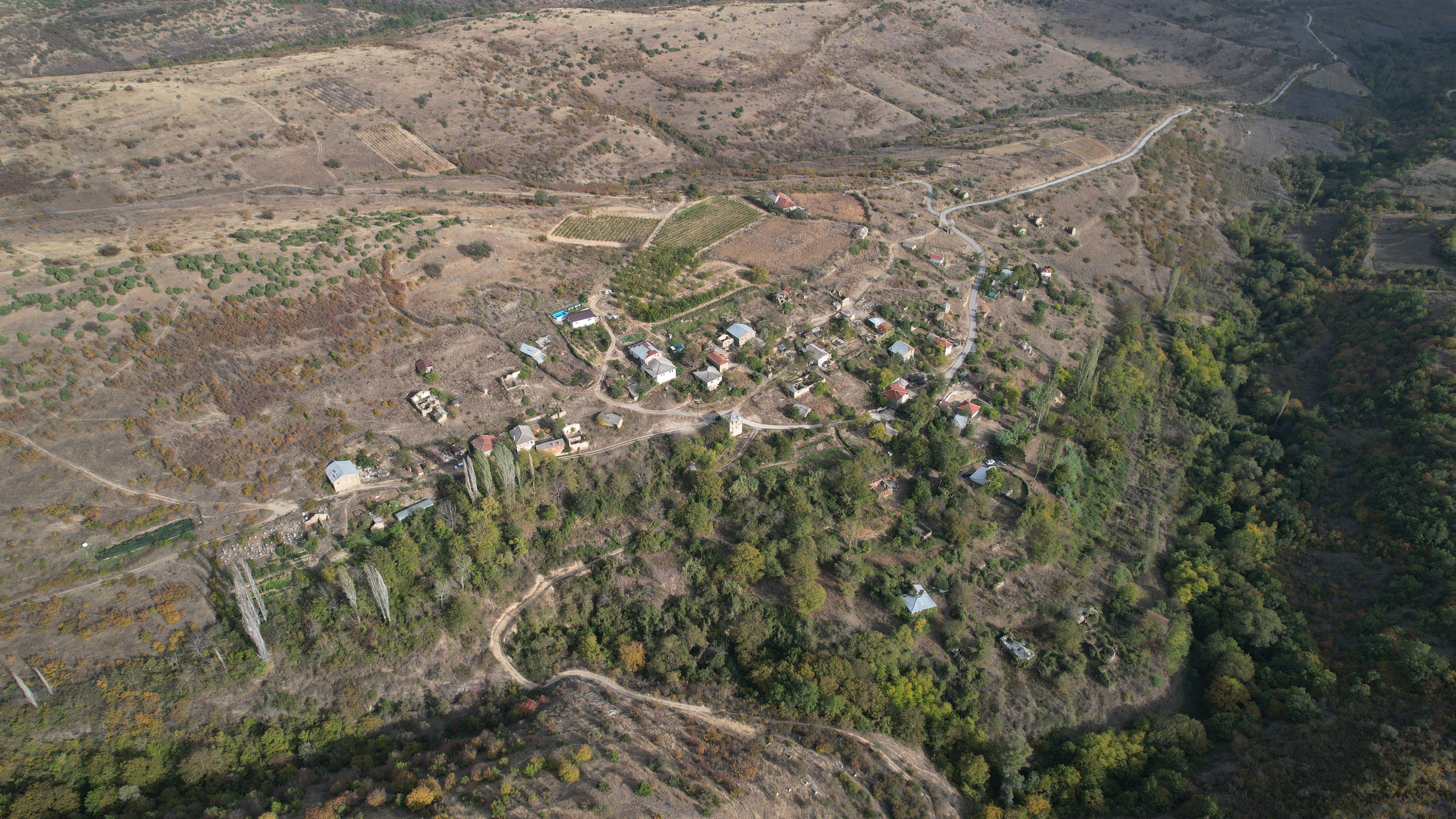
- Air view of the village

- Location within North Macedonia
- Country: North Macedonia
- Region: Vardar
- Municipality: Kavadarci
- Elevation: 406 m (1,332 ft)

Population (2021)
  - Total: 9
- Time zone: UTC+1 (CET)

Fariš is a small village located in the corner of the Kavadarci Municipality in North Macedonia.

== Demographics ==
According to the 2002 census, the village had a total of 23 inhabitants. Ethnic groups in the village include: According to the census of 2021, there were 9 inhabitants living in the village, of Macedonians, Serb and person without data.

- Macedonians 7
- Serbs 1
- person without data 1
