= Aïn Fares =

Aïn Fares may refer to:

- Aïn Fares, M'Sila, Algeria
- Aïn Fares, Mascara, Algeria
