= La Fare =

La Fare may refer to:

== Places ==
- La Fare-en-Champsaur, a commune in the Hautes-Alpes department in southeastern France
- La Fare-les-Oliviers, a commune in the Bouches-du-Rhône department in southern France

== People ==
- Anne Louis Henri de La Fare (1752–1829), French Roman Catholic cardinal and counter-revolutionary
- Charles Auguste de la Fare conte of Laugères, baron of Balazu (1644–1712), French poet memorialist
- Philippe Charles de La Fare, 4th marquis of Monclar, Conte of Laugères (1687–1752), Marshal of France
