= Fare network =

Network countering discrimination in European football

- Founded: February 1999
- Location: London, England
- Region served: Europe
- Key people: Piara Powar; Executive director
- Website: farenet.org

The Fare network (formerly Football Against Racism in Europe) is a network set up to counter discrimination in European football. The network was set up in Vienna, Austria, in February 1999 after a meeting of football supporters' groups, football players' unions and football associations. The network has received backing from the European governing body UEFA, FIFA and the European Commission for its aims.

== See also ==
- Football Supporters Europe
