= Fares (name) =

Fares or Farès is a masculine given name and surname of Arabic origin, often a variant of Faris. Notable people with the name include:

== Given name ==
=== Fares ===
- Fares Arfa (born 1994), Canadian fencer
- Fares Arnaout (born 1997), Syrian football player
- Fares Al-Ayyaf (born 1992), Saudi footballer
- Fares Badawi (born 1996), Palestinian judoka
- Fares El-Bakh (born 1998), Qatari weightlifter
- Fares Bayoush (born 1970), Syrian military officer
- Fares Dessouky (born 1994), Egyptian squash player
- Fares Djabelkheir (born 1975), Algerian football player
- Fares Nechat Djabri (born 2001), Algerian footballer
- Fares Fares (born 1973), Swedish-Lebanese actor of Assyrian descent
- Fares Al-Garzae (born 2001), Saudi Arabian football player
- Fares Hamdi (born 1980), Tunisian paralympian athlete
- Fares Al Hatrash (born 1991), Saudi footballer
- Fares Al-Helou (born 1961), Syrian actor
- Fares Al Janahi (born 1999), Emirati tennis player
- Fares Jumaa (born 1988), Emirati footballer
- Fares Karam (born 1973), Lebanese singer
- Fares Khaled (born 2005), Egyptian football player
- Fares al-Khoury (1877–1962), Syrian statesman, politician, and father of modern Syrian politics
- Fares Nikhadovich Kilzie (born 1968), Russian entrepreneur
- Fares Maakaroun (born 1940), Lebanese Brazilian Melkite Greek Catholic bishop
- Fares Mana'a (born 1965), Yemeni arms-dealer, businessman rebel commander and politician
- Fares D. Noujaim, Lebanese American banker
- Fares Juma Al Saadi (born 1988), Emirati football player
- Fares Sayegh, Greek surgeon
- Fares Shehabi (born 1972), Syrian businessman and politician
- Fares Souaid (born 1958), Lebanese politician
- Fares Al Soud (born 2000), Canadian politician
- Fares Tarek (born 2000), Egyptian footballer
- Fares Zeideia (born 1966), Palestinian-American restaurant owner

=== Farès ===
- Farès Bahlouli (born 1995), French football player
- Farès Benabderahmane (born 1987), Algerian football player
- Farès Boueiz (born 1955), Lebanese politician
- Farès Bousdira (born 1953), Algerian-born French football player
- Farès Bousnina (born 2006), Tunisian footballer
- Farès Brahimi (born 1988), Algerian football player
- Farès Chaïbi (born 2002), French football player
- Farès Fellahi (born 1975), Algerian football player
- Farès Ferjani (born 1997), Tunisian fencer
- Farès Ghedjemis (born 2002), French-Algerian footballer
- Farès Hachi (born 1989), Algerian football player
- Farès Hamiti (born 1987), Algerian football player
- Farés Mehenni (born 2002), Algerian football player
- Farès Ziam (born 1997), French mixed martial artist

== Surname ==
=== Fares ===
- Abbas Fares (1902–1978), Egyptian actor
- Amber Fares, Lebanese Canadian filmmaker
- Angelina Fares (born 1989), Israeli model
- Ayman Abu Fares (born 1988), Jordanian football player
- Fabiana Fares (born 1972), Italian pentathlete
- Fuad Fares (born 1955), Israeli biologist and pharmacologist
- Imad Fares (born 1961), Israeli military officer
- Issam Fares (born 1937), Lebanese businessman and politician
- Jallouli Fares (1909–2001), Tunisian politician
- Jawad Fares (born 1991), Lebanese physician and scientist
- Josef Fares (born 1977), Swedish film director
- Kathlyn Fares (born 1942), American politician
- Laura Fares (born 1978), Argentine musician
- Mohamad Fares (footballer born 1990), Syrian football player
- Myriam Fares (born 1983), Lebanese singer and entertainer
- Nadia Fares Anliker (born 1962), Egyptian-Swiss film director and screenwriter
- Nawaf al-Fares, Syrian diplomat
- Nicole Fares, Lebanese academic and translator
- Ola Al-Fares (born 1985), Jordanian lawyer and journalist
- Omar Abu Fares (born 1984), Jordanian swimmer
- Qadura Fares, Palestinian politician
- Raed Fares (born 1982), Palestinian football player
- Raed Fares (activist) (1972–2018), Syrian political activist
- Roy Fares (born 1984), Lebanese-born Swedish pastry chef
- Sonia Fares (born 1949), Lebanese fashion designer
- Tania Fares, Lebanese-born fashion writer
- Tara Fares (1996–2018), Iraqi model
- Wadih Fares, Canadian property developer
- Youssef Fares (neurosurgeon), Lebanese neurosurgeon and academic
- Youssef Fares (sport shooter) (1906–??), Egyptian sports shooter

=== Farès ===
- Abderrahmane Farès (1911–1991), Algerian politician
- Mohamed Farès (born 1996), Algerian football player
- Nabile Farès (1940–2016), Algerian novelist
- Nadia Farès (1968–2026), Moroccan-French actress

=== Phares ===
- Walid Phares or Fares (born 1957), Lebanese-born American scholar and conservative political pundit
