= Faris (name) =

- Pronunciation: Arabic: [ˈfaːrɪs]
- Gender: Male

Other gender
- Feminine: Farisa

Origin
- Origin: Arabic
- Meaning: Knight

Other names
- Alternative spelling: Fares, Farres, Farris, Fariz, Firas, Feras, Ferris
- Related names: MacFergus

Faris is an Arabic masculine given name and surname.

In Arabic, Faris (فارس) translates to "knight."

In the Balkans, Faris is popular among Bosniaks in the former Yugoslav nations. It is similar to other popular names in the region, such as Haris and Daris. This region also has a female equivalent: Farisa.

It is also used as a surname, particularly by Europeans, which is likely an anglicization of the surname MacFergus.

== Given name ==
- Faris Arapović (born 1970), Bosnian drummer
- Faris Abdalla (born 1994), Sudanese football player
- Faris ad-Din Aktai (died 1254), Turkic-Kipchak Emir (prince) and the leader of the Mamluks
- Faris al-Ansari (born 1984), Afghani held in the United States's Guantanamo Bay detention center
- Faris Badwan (born 1986), Palestinian-English musician, lead vocalist of The Horrors and half of Cat's Eyes
- Faris Efendić (born 1983), Bosnian footballer
- Faris Glubb (1939–2004), British-Jordanian writer, journalist, translator and publisher
- Faris Handžić (born 1995), Bosnian footballer
- Faris Haroun (born 1985), Chadian-Canadian-Belgian football player
- Faris Hasić (born 2003), Bosnian footballer
- Faris Kermani (born 1952), British film director
- Faris Krkalić (born 2002), Bosnian footballer
- Fāris ibn ʿAlī al-Marīni, also known as "Abu Inan Faris" (1329–1358), a Marinid ruler of Morocco
- Faris McReynolds (born 1977), American artist and musician
- Faris Nimr (1856–1951), Lebanese journalist
- Faris Odeh (1985–2000), Palestinian boy shot dead by the Israel Defense Forces
- Faris Al-Sultan (born 1978), Iraqi-German triathlete
- Faris al-Zahrani (1977–2016), Saudi Arabian terrorist
- Faris Zubanović (born 2000), Bosnian footballer

== Surname ==
- Alexander Faris (1921–2015), Northern Irish composer and conductor
- Anna Faris (born 1976), American actress and producer
- Basil Favis, Canadian chemist and professor
- Ellsworth Faris (1874–1953), American sociologist
- George W. Faris (1854–1914), American politician, U.S. Representative from Indiana
- Herman P. Faris (1858–1936), proponent of the Temperance movement
- Mustapha Faris (1933–2023), Moroccan statesman and banker
- Muhammed Faris (1951–2024), Syrian military aviator
- Iyman Faris (born 1969), convicted Pakistani-American rogue FBI agent working for Al Qaeda
- Paula Faris (born 1975), American television correspondent
- Peter Faris (born 1948), Australian criminal lawyer, media commentator and former radio broadcaster
- Sadeg Faris (born 1946), Libyan-American inventor and entrepreneur
- Sean Faris (born 1982), American actor, model, and producer
- Stephan Faris (born 1973), American journalist
- Valerie Faris (born 1958), American film directors and music video director

== Fictional characters ==
- Faris NyanNyan, in the anime series Steins;Gate
- Faris Scherwiz, alias of a main female character in the video game Final Fantasy V

== See also ==
- Fares (name)
- Farris (surname)
- Ferris (name)
