= Brian Keith Jones =

Australian convicted sex offender and burglar

- Brian Keith Jones, police mugshot
- Born: 1947 (age 78–79)
- Other names: Brendan John Megson, Mr Baldy
- Convictions: Abduction; child sexual abuse; indecent assault; sexual penetration; burglary; theft
- Penalty: 14 years

Brian Keith Jones (born 1947), formerly known as Brendan John Megson and Whispen, is an Australian sex offender who was convicted of the abduction and sexual assault of six male children between 1979 and 1980. Jones was given the nickname Mr Baldy for shaving his victims' hair and dressing them in female clothing during the attacks.

== Criminal background ==
He pleaded guilty to 17 charges, including six of indecent assault on a male under 16, six of abduction, two of burglary and two of theft. He was sentenced to 14 years jail with a non-parole period of 12 years. After remissions of one-third, he was paroled in 1989 and he raped a nine-year-old-boy and sexually abused the victim's six-year-old brother within weeks. He was convicted of aggravated rape, sexual penetration of a child under 10 and three counts of indecent assault, and was sentenced in 1992 to 14 years imprisonment with a non parole period of 12 years to be served cumulatively with the balance of parole that he breached.

Under the terms of the sentence, Jones was eligible for parole in August 2003, and was eventually released from HM Prison Ararat in July 2005 with the strictest parole conditions ever given to a Victorian prisoner. The extended supervision order imposed 23 conditions, restricting his movements and contact with other people, and was to wear an electronic anklet to allow monitoring 24 hours a day. Jones was first settled in an undisclosed residential area, later revealed to be in the Ascot Vale area, causing public outcry over his placement near schools and playgrounds. After a vigil by protesters outside the house, Jones was moved from this address to a cottage within the perimeter of HM Prison Ararat.

On 7 August 2005, talk radio show host Derryn Hinch revealed Jones' living arrangements on air; Hinch's comments caused controversy in the Melbourne suburb of Frankston, where residents attacked the house named on air and abused its occupants, and a local supermarket began a petition to remove Jones from the area. Hinch later revealed his comments were mistaken and Jones was not living at the Frankston address.

The following day the Victorian government represented by Peter Faris QC applied to the County Court of Victoria for a 15-year supervision order under the Serious Sex Offenders Monitoring Act, enabling Jones to be supervised once his parole term expired. Jones appeared in court via video-link and did not contest the application.

In August 2006, Jones was caught wandering the streets of Ararat, in breach of his supervision order and was arrested by prison officers and was imprisoned indefinitely for multiple breaches of his parole conditions. For two weeks in 2008, power was lost to the electronic equipment set up to monitor Jones' movements. Authorities believed he deliberately disconnected the mains power supply to the monitoring unit in his cottage. In 2016 under supervision, he was attending the Salvation Army men's shed program.

== See also ==
- Child sexual abuse in Australia
- Garry David - (d. 1993), Victorian prisoner during the 1990s who remained imprisoned beyond his sentence due to fears for public safety.
