= Burden of proof (law) =

Obligation on a party to prove their case

In a legal dispute, one party has the burden of proof to show that they are correct, while the other party has no such burden and is presumed to be correct. The burden of proof requires a party to produce evidence to establish the truth of facts needed to satisfy all the required legal elements of the dispute. It is also known as the onus of proof.

The burden of proof is usually on the person who brings a claim in a dispute. It is often associated with the Latin maxim semper necessitas probandi incumbit ei qui agit, a translation of which is: "the necessity of proof always lies with the person who lays charges." In civil suits, for example, the plaintiff bears the burden of proof that the defendant's action or inaction caused injury to the plaintiff, and the defendant bears the burden of proving an affirmative defense. The burden of proof is on the prosecutor for criminal cases, and the defendant is presumed innocent. If the claimant fails to discharge the burden of proof to prove their case, the claim will be dismissed.

== Definition ==
A "burden of proof" is a party's duty to prove a disputed assertion or charge, and includes the burden of production (providing enough evidence on an issue so that the trier-of-fact decides it rather than in a peremptory ruling like a directed verdict) and the burden of persuasion (standard of proof such as preponderance of the evidence). Legal standards for burden of proof can be categorized by their required probabilities of cause and Blackstone's ratios.

A "burden of persuasion" or "risk of non-persuasion" is an obligation that remains on a single party for the duration of the court proceeding. Once the burden has been entirely discharged to the satisfaction of the trier of fact, the party carrying the burden will succeed in its claim. For example, the presumption of innocence in a criminal case places a legal burden upon the prosecution to prove all elements of the offense (generally beyond a reasonable doubt), and to disprove all the defenses except for affirmative defenses in which the proof of non-existence of all affirmative defense(s) is not constitutionally required of the prosecution.

The burden of persuasion should not be confused with the evidential burden, or burden of production, or duty of producing (or going forward with evidence) which is an obligation that may shift between parties over the course of the hearing or trial. The evidential burden is the burden to adduce sufficient evidence to properly raise an issue at court.

There is no burden of proof with regard to motive or animus in criminal cases in the United States. The intent surrounding an offense is nevertheless crucial to the elements of the offense in a first-degree-murder conviction. This brings up the ethical dilemma of whether or not a death sentence should be imposed when the defendant's motives or intentions are the contingent factors in sentencing. However, in some cases such as defamation suits with a public figure as the defamed party, the public figure must prove actual malice.

== Standards of proof in the United States ==
Burden of proof refers most generally to the obligation of a party to prove its allegations at trial. In a civil case, the plaintiff sets forth its allegations in a complaint, petition or other pleading. The defendant is then required to file a responsive pleading denying some or all of the allegations and setting forth any affirmative facts in defense. Each party has the burden of proof of its allegations.

=== Legal standards for burden of proof ===
==== Some evidence ====
Per Superintendent v. Hill (1985), in order to take away a prisoner's good conduct time for a disciplinary violation, prison officials need only have "some evidence", i.e., "a modicum of evidence"; however, the sentencing judge is under no obligation to adhere to good/work time constraints, nor are they required to credit time served.

==== Reasonable indications ====
"Reasonable indication (also known as reasonable suspicion) is substantially lower than probable cause; factors to consider are those facts and circumstances a prudent investigator would consider, but must include facts or circumstances indicating a past, current, or impending violation; an objective factual basis must be present, a mere 'hunch' is insufficient."

The reasonable indication standard is used in interpreting trade law in determining if the United States has been materially injured.

==== Reasonable suspicion ====
Reasonable suspicion is a low standard of proof to determine whether a brief investigative stop or search by a police officer or any government agent is warranted. This stop or search must be brief; its thoroughness is proportional to, and limited by, the low standard of evidence. A more definite standard of proof (often probable cause) would be required to justify a more thorough stop/search. In Terry v. Ohio, 392 U.S. 1 (1968), the Supreme Court ruled that reasonable suspicion requires specific, articulable, and individualized suspicion that crime is afoot. A mere guess or "hunch" is not enough to constitute reasonable suspicion.

An investigatory stop is a seizure under the Fourth Amendment. The state must justify the seizure by showing that the officer conducting the stop had a reasonable articulable suspicion that criminal activity was afoot. The important point is that officers cannot deprive a citizen of liberty unless the officer can point to specific facts and circumstances and inferences therefrom that would amount to a reasonable suspicion. The officer must be prepared to establish that criminal activity was a logical explanation for what they perceived. The requirement serves to prevent officers from stopping individuals based merely on hunches or unfounded suspicions. The purpose of the stop and detention is to investigate to the extent necessary to confirm or dispel the original suspicion. If the initial confrontation with the person stopped dispels suspicion of criminal activity the officer must end the detention and allow the person to go about their business. If the investigation confirms the officer's initial suspicion or reveals evidence that would justify continued detention the officer may require the person detained to remain at the scene until further investigation is complete, and may give rise to the level of probable cause.

==== Reasonable to believe ====
In Arizona v. Gant (2009), the United States Supreme Court arguably defined a new standard, that of "reasonable to believe". This standard applies only to vehicle searches after the suspect has been placed under arrest. The Court overruled New York v. Belton (1981) and concluded that police officers are allowed to go back and search a vehicle incident to a suspect's arrest only where it is "reasonable to believe" that there is more evidence in the vehicle of the crime for which the suspect was arrested.

There is still an ongoing debate as to the exact meaning of this phrase. Some courts have said it should be a new standard while others have equated it with the "reasonable suspicion" of the Terry stop. Most courts have agreed it is somewhere less than probable cause.

==== Probable cause ====
Probable cause is a higher standard of proof than reasonable suspicion, which is used in the United States to determine whether a search, or an arrest, is unreasonable. It is also used by grand juries to determine whether to issue an indictment. In the civil context, this standard is often used where plaintiffs are seeking a prejudgement remedy.

In the criminal context, the U.S. Supreme Court in United States v. Sokolow, 490 U.S. 1 (1989), determined that probable cause requires "a fair probability that contraband or evidence of a crime will be found". The primary issue was whether Drug Enforcement Administration agents had a reason to execute a search. Courts have traditionally interpreted the idea of "a fair probability" as meaning whether a fair-minded evaluator would have reason to find it more likely than not that a fact (or ultimate fact) is true, which is quantified as a 51% certainty standard (using whole numbers as the increment of measurement). Some courts and scholars have suggested probable cause could, in some circumstances, allow for a fact to be established as true to a standard of less than 51%, but as of August 2019, the United States Supreme Court has never ruled that the quantification of probable cause is anything less than 51%. Probable cause can be contrasted with "reasonable articulable suspicion" which requires a police officer to have an unquantified amount of certainty the courts say is well below 51% before briefly detaining a suspect (without consent) to pat them down and attempt to question them. The "beyond reasonable doubt" standard, used by most criminal juries to determine guilt for a crime, also contrasts with probable cause which courts hold requires an unquantified level of proof well above that of probable cause's 51%. Though a specific number is not officially used most times, common consensus places it closer to 90% Though it is beyond the scope of this topic, when courts review whether 51% probable cause certainty was a reasonable judgment, the legal inquiry is different for police officers in the field than it would be for grand jurors. In Franks v. Delaware (1978), the U.S. Supreme Court held that probable cause requires that there not be "reckless disregard for the truth" of the facts asserted.

Examples of a police officer's truth-certainty standards in the field and their practical consequences are offered below:

- no level of evidence required: a knowing and voluntary consent-based encounter between police officer and another person
- reasonable articulable suspicion of criminal activity required: an involuntary stop initiated by the officer to briefly detain, attempt to question, and pat down outer clothing of a person of interest to police.
- probable cause of 51% truth or higher required that a crime was committed by a specific person: arrest and/or grand jury indictment of that person.

==== Some credible evidence ====
Some credible evidence is one of the least demanding standards of proof. This proof standard is often used in administrative law settings and in some states to initiate Child Protective Services (CPS) proceedings. This proof standard is used where short-term intervention is needed urgently, such as when a child is arguably in immediate danger from a parent or guardian. The "some credible evidence" standard is used as a legal placeholder to bring some controversy before a trier of fact, and into a legal process. It is on the order of the factual standard of proof needed to achieve a finding of "probable cause" used in ex parte threshold determinations needed before a court will issue a search warrant. It is a lower standard of proof than the "preponderance of the evidence" standard. The standard does not require the fact-finder to weigh conflicting evidence, and merely requires the investigator or prosecutor to present the bare minimum of material credible evidence to support the allegations against the subject, or in support of the allegation; see Valmonte v. Bane, 18 F.3d 992 (2nd Cir. 1994). In some Federal Appellate Circuit Courts, such as the Second Circuit, the "some credible evidence" standard has been found constitutionally insufficient to protect liberty interests of the parties in controversy at CPS hearings.

==== Preponderance of the evidence ====
Preponderance of the evidence (American English), also known as balance of probabilities (British English), is the standard required in civil cases, including family court determinations solely involving money, such as child support under the Child Support Standards Act, and in child custody determinations between parties having equal legal rights respecting a child. It is also the standard of proof by which the defendant must prove affirmative defenses or mitigating circumstances in civil or criminal court in the United States. In civil courts, aggravating circumstances also only have to be proven by a preponderance of the evidence, as opposed to beyond reasonable doubt (as in criminal court).

The standard is met if the proposition is more likely to be true than not true. Another high-level way of interpreting that is that the plaintiff's case (evidence) be 51% likely. A more precise statement is that "the weight [of the evidence, including in calculating such a percentage] is determined not by the amount of evidence, but by its quality." The author goes on to affirm that preponderance is "merely enough to tip the scales" towards one party; however, that tilt need only be so slight as the weight of a "feather." Until 1970, it was also the standard used in juvenile court in the United States. Compared to the criminal standard of "proof beyond a reasonable doubt," the preponderance of the evidence standard is "a somewhat easier standard to meet."

Preponderance of the evidence is also the standard of proof used in United States administrative law. In at least one case, there is a statutory definition of the standard.

While there is no federal definition, such as by definition of the courts or by statute applicable to all cases, The Merit Systems Protection Board's has codified their definition at 5 CFR 1201.56(c)(2). MSPB defines the standard as "The degree of relevant evidence that a reasonable person, considering the record as a whole, would accept as sufficient to find that a contested fact is more likely to be true than untrue." One author highlights the phrase "more likely to be true than untrue" as the critical component of the definition.

From 2013 to 2020, the Department of Education required schools to use a preponderance of evidence standard in evaluating sexual assault claims.

==== Clear and convincing evidence ====
Clear and convincing evidence is a higher level of burden of persuasion than "preponderance of the evidence", but less than "beyond reasonable doubt". It is employed intra-adjudicatively in administrative court determinations, as well as in civil and certain criminal procedure in the United States. For example, a prisoner seeking habeas corpus relief from capital punishment must prove his factual innocence by clear and convincing evidence. New York State uses this standard when a court must determine whether to involuntarily hospitalize a mentally ill patient or to issue an Assisted Outpatient Treatment Order. This standard was also codified by the United States Supreme Court in all mental health civil commitment cases.

This standard is used in many types of equity cases, including paternity, persons in need of supervision, child custody, the probate of both wills and living wills, petitions to remove a person from life support ("right to die" cases), mental hygiene and involuntary hospitalizations, and many similar cases.

Clear and convincing evidence is the standard of proof used for immunity from prosecution under Florida's stand-your-ground law. Once raised by the defense, the state must present its evidence in a pre-trial hearing, showing that the statutory prerequisites have not been met, and then request that the court deny a motion for declaration of immunity. The judge must then decide from clear and convincing evidence whether to grant immunity. This is a lower burden than "beyond a reasonable doubt", the threshold a prosecutor must meet at any proceeding criminal trial, but higher than the "probable cause" threshold generally required for indictment.

Clear and convincing proof means that the evidence presented by a party during the trial must be highly and substantially more probable to be true than not and the trier of fact must have a firm belief or conviction in its factuality. In this standard, a greater degree of believability must be met than the common standard of proof in civil actions (i.e. preponderance of the evidence), which only requires that the facts as a threshold be more likely than not to prove the issue for which they are asserted.

This standard is also known as "clear, convincing, and satisfactory evidence"; "clear, cognizant, and convincing evidence", and is applied in cases or situations involving an equitable remedy or where a presumptive civil liberty interest exists. For example, this is the standard or quantum of evidence use to probate a last will and testament.

==== Beyond reasonable doubt ====
This is the highest standard used as the burden of proof in Anglo-American jurisprudence and typically only applies in juvenile delinquency proceedings, criminal proceedings, and when considering aggravating circumstances in criminal proceedings. It has been described, in negative terms, as a proof having been met if there is no plausible reason to believe otherwise. If there is a real doubt, based upon reason and common sense after careful and impartial consideration of all the evidence, or lack of evidence, in a case, then the level of proof has not been met.

Proof beyond a reasonable doubt, therefore, is proof of such a convincing character that one would be willing to rely and act upon it without hesitation in the most important of one's own affairs. However, it does not mean an absolute certainty. The standard that must be met by the prosecution's evidence in a criminal prosecution is that no other logical explanation can be derived from the facts except that the defendant committed the crime, thereby overcoming the presumption that a person is innocent unless and until proven guilty.

If the trier of fact has no doubt as to the defendant's guilt, or if their only doubts are unreasonable doubts, then the prosecutor has proved the defendant's guilt beyond a reasonable doubt and the defendant should be pronounced guilty.

The term connotes that evidence establishes a particular point to a moral certainty which precludes the existence of any reasonable alternatives. It does not mean that no doubt exists as to the accused's guilt, but only that no reasonable doubt is possible from the evidence presented. Further to this notion of moral certainty, where the trier of fact relies on proof that is solely circumstantial, i.e., when conviction is based entirely on circumstantial evidence, certain jurisdictions specifically require the prosecution's burden of proof to be such that the facts proved must exclude to a moral certainty every reasonable hypothesis or inference other than guilt.

The main reason that this high level of proof is demanded in criminal trials is that such proceedings can result in the deprivation of a defendant's liberty or even in their death. These outcomes are far more severe than in civil trials, in which monetary damages are the common remedy.

Another noncriminal instance in which proof beyond a reasonable doubt is applied is LPS conservatorship.

== Standards of proof in the United Kingdom ==
In the three jurisdictions of the UK (Northern Ireland; England and Wales; and Scotland) there are only two standards of proof in trials. There are others which are defined in statutes, such as those relating to police powers.

- The criminal standard was formerly described as "beyond reasonable doubt". That standard remains, and the words commonly used, though the Judicial Studies Board guidance is that juries might be assisted by being told that to convict they must be persuaded "so that you are sure".
- The civil standard is 'the balance of probabilities', often referred to in judgments as "more likely than not". Lord Denning, in Miller v. Minister of Pensions, worded the standard as "more probable than not".

The civil standard is also used in criminal trials in relation to those defences which must be proven by the defendant (for example, the statutory defence to drunk in charge that there was no likelihood of the accused driving while still over the alcohol limit). However, where the law does not stipulate a reverse burden of proof, the defendant need only raise the issue and it is then for the prosecution to negate the defence to the criminal standard in the usual way (for example, that of self-defence).

Prior to the decision of the House of Lords in Re B (A Child) [2008] UKHL 35, there had been some confusion – even at the Court of Appeal – as to whether there was some intermediate standard, described as the 'heightened standard'. The House of Lords found that there was not. As the above description of the American system shows, anxiety by judges about making decisions on very serious matters on the basis of the balance of probabilities had led to a departure from the common law principles of just two standards. Baroness Hale said:

70. ... Neither the seriousness of the allegation nor the seriousness of the consequences should make any difference to the standard of proof to be applied in determining the facts. The inherent probabilities are simply something to be taken into account, where relevant, in deciding where the truth lies.

72. ... there is no logical or necessary connection between seriousness and probability. Some seriously harmful behaviour, such as murder, is sufficiently rare to be inherently improbable in most circumstances. Even then there are circumstances, such as a body with its throat cut and no weapon to hand, where it is not at all improbable. Other seriously harmful behaviour, such as alcohol or drug abuse, is regrettably all too common and not at all improbable. Nor are serious allegations made in a vacuum. Consider the famous example of the animal seen in Regent's Park. If it is seen outside the zoo on a stretch of greensward regularly used for walking dogs, then of course it is more likely to be a dog than a lion. If it is seen in the zoo next to the lions' enclosure when the door is open, then it may well be more likely to be a lion than a dog.

The task for the tribunal then when faced with serious allegations is to recognize that their seriousness generally means they are inherently unlikely, such that to be satisfied that a fact is more likely than not the evidence must be of a good quality. But the standard of proof remains 'the balance of probabilities'.

In competition law cases, the standard of proof is the civil standard ("on the balance of probabilities") subject, because of the financial penalties involved, to a heightened requirement that strong and compelling evidence commensurate with the seriousness of the case against an alleged offender must be found.

== Standards of proof in Australia ==
In Australia, two standards of proof are applied at common law: the criminal standard and the civil standard. It is possible for other standards of proof to be applied where required by law.

=== Criminal standard ===
The criminal standard in Australia is 'beyond reasonable doubt'. An offence against a Commonwealth law, with a term of imprisonment in excess of 12 months is an indictable offence and is constitutionally required to be tried before jury of 12 people. Offences that do not carry a term of imprisonment exceeding 12 months are called summary offences. Some offences (with a term of imprisonment less than 10 years) may be heard by a court of summary jurisdiction with the consent of all parties; however the court may not impose a sentence greater than 12 months. Juries are required to make findings of guilt beyond reasonable doubt for criminal matters.

The Australian constitution does not expressly provide that criminal trials must be fair, nor does it set out the elements of a fair trial, but it may by implication protect other attributes. The Australian Law Reform Commission has stated that the High Court has moved toward entrenching procedural fairness as a constitutional right, but has not yet done so. If it did so, this would have the potential to constitutionalise the 'beyond reasonable doubt' standard in criminal proceedings.

State offences are not subject to the constitution's section 80 requirement for a jury. However, the case of Kirk v Industrial Relations Commission of New South Wales constrains the way that State courts may operate during criminal trials per the Kable doctrine.

=== Civil standard ===
In Australia, the civil standard is termed the balance of probabilities. In Australia, the balance of probabilities involves considerations that the evidence required to establish a fact at the civil standard will vary with the seriousness of what is being alleged. The Court of Appeal of England and Wales has noted that a similar approach is taken in Canada; but the United Kingdom the evidential requirements of the civil standard of proof do not vary with the seriousness of an allegation.

The case law that establishes this is Briginshaw v Briginshaw. The case has since been incorporated into the uniform evidence law. The Briginshaw principle was articulated by Dixon in that case in these terms:

... it is enough that the affirmative of an allegation is made out to the reasonable satisfaction of the tribunal. But reasonable satisfaction is not a state of mind that is attained or established independently of the nature and consequence of the fact or facts to be proved. The seriousness of an allegation made, the inherent unlikelihood of an occurrence of a given description, or the gravity of the consequences flowing from a particular finding are considerations which must affect the answer to the question whether the issue has been proved to the reasonable satisfaction of the tribunal. In such matters "reasonable satisfaction" should not be produced by inexact proofs, indefinite testimony, or indirect inferences. Everyone must feel that, when, for instance, the issue is on which of two dates an admitted occurrence took place, a satisfactory conclusion may be reached on materials of a kind that would not satisfy any sound and prudent judgment if the question was whether some act had been done involving grave moral delinquency

The Briginshaw principle is sometimes incorrectly referred to as the Briginshaw standard of proof; in Qantas Airways Limited v. Gama Justices French and Jacobson stated the "Briginshaw test does not create any third standard of proof between the civil and the criminal."

In the High Court case of G v. H, Justices Deane, Dawson and Gaudron stated "Not every case involves issues of importance and gravity in the Briginshaw v. Briginshaw sense. The need to proceed with caution is clear if, for example, there is an allegation of fraud or an allegation of criminal or moral wrongdoing."

An example of the Briginshaw principle applied in practice is the case of Roberts-Smith v Fairfax Media, a defamation case where, due to the gravity of the allegations, Fairfax Media was required to rely on stronger proof than in the context of a normal allegation to win their case. (Note: The allegations were that the defendant was a murderer and war criminal.) In the end, despite the high burden of proof required, Fairfax won the trial, with Besanko ruling that it was proven he "broke the moral and legal rules of military engagement and is therefore a criminal".

Melbourne Law School professor Jeremy Gans has noted that for particularly serious allegations, such as sexual assault, "It's hard to see how the Briginshaw principle is much different to beyond reasonable doubt". The decision has also been noted for affecting the ability of litigants to seek redress in anti-discrimination lawsuits, due to the seriousness of such allegations.

== Other standards for presenting cases or defenses ==
=== Air of reality ===
The "air of reality" is a standard of proof used in Canada to determine whether a criminal defense may be used. The test asks whether a defense can be successful if it is assumed that all the claimed facts are to be true. In most cases, the burden of proof rests solely on the prosecution, negating the need for a defense of this kind. However, when exceptions arise and the burden of proof has been shifted to the defendant, they are required to establish a defense that bears an "air of reality". Two instances in which such a case might arise are, first, when a prima facie case has been made against the defendant or, second, when the defense mounts an affirmative defense, such as the insanity defense. This is similar to the concept of summary judgment in the United States, though not identical.

=== Evidentiary standards of proof ===
Depending on the legal venue or intra-case hearing, varying levels of reliability of proof are considered dispositive of the inquiry being entertained. If the subject threshold level of reliability has been met by the presentation of the evidence, then the thing is considered legally proved for that trial, hearing or inquest. For example, in California, several evidentiary presumptions are codified, including a presumption that the owner of legal title is the beneficial owner (rebuttable only by clear and convincing evidence).

== Examples ==
=== Criminal law ===
Criminal cases usually place the burden of proof on the prosecutor (expressed in the Latin brocard ei incumbit probatio qui dicit, non qui negat, "the burden of proof rests on who asserts, not on who denies"). This principle is known as the presumption of innocence, and is summed up with "innocent until proven guilty", but is not upheld in all legal systems or jurisdictions. Where it is upheld, the accused will be found not guilty if this burden of proof is not sufficiently shown by the prosecution. The presumption of innocence means three things:

- With respect to the critical facts of a case the defendant has no burden of proof whatsoever.
- The state must prove the critical facts of the case to the appropriate level of certainty.
- The jury is not to draw any inferences adverse to the defendant from the fact that they have been charged with a crime and are present in court facing the charges against them.

For example, if the defendant (D) is charged with murder, the prosecutor (P) bears the burden of proof to show the jury that D did indeed murder someone.

- Burden of proof: P
  - Burden of production: P has to show some evidence that D had committed murder. The United States Supreme Court has ruled that the Constitution requires enough evidence to justify a rational trier of fact to find guilt beyond a reasonable doubt. If the judge rules that such burden has been met, then it is up to the jury itself to decide if they are, in fact, convinced of guilty beyond a reasonable doubt. If the judge finds there is not enough evidence under the standard, the case must be dismissed (or a subsequent guilty verdict must be vacated and the charges dismissed).
    - e.g. witness, forensic evidence, autopsy report
    - Failure to meet the burden: the issue will be decided as a matter of law. In this case, D is presumed innocent
  - Burden of persuasion: if at the close of evidence, the jury cannot decide if P has established with relevant level of certainty that D had committed murder, the jury must find D not guilty of the crime of murder
    - Measure of proof: P has to prove every element of the offense beyond a reasonable doubt, but not necessarily prove every single fact beyond a reasonable doubt.

However, in England and Wales, the Magistrates' Courts Act 1980, s.101 stipulates that where a defendant relies on some "exception, exemption, proviso, excuse or qualification" in their defence in a summary trial, the legal burden of proof as to that exception falls on the defendant, though only on the balance of probabilities. For example, a person charged with being drunk in charge of a motor vehicle can raise the defense that there was no likelihood of their driving while drunk. The prosecution has the legal burden of proof beyond reasonable doubt that the defendant was unfit to drive through drink and was in charge of a motor vehicle. Possession of the keys is usually sufficient to prove being in charge, even if the defendant is not in the vehicle and is perhaps in a nearby bar. That being proved, the defendant has the legal burden of proof on the balance of probabilities that they were not likely to drive.

In 2002, such practice in England and Wales was challenged as contrary to the European Convention on Human Rights (ECHR), art.6(2) guaranteeing right to a fair trial. The House of Lords held that:

- A mere evidential burden did not contravene art. 6(2);
- A legal / persuasive burden did not necessarily contravene art. 6(2) so long as confined within reasonable limits, considering the questions:
  - What must the prosecution prove to transfer burden to the defendant?
  - Is the defendant required to prove something difficult or easily within his access?
  - What threat to society is the provision designed to combat?

In some cases, there is a reverse onus on the accused. A typical example is that of a hit-and-run charge prosecuted under the Canadian Criminal Code. The defendant is presumed to have fled the scene of a crash, to avoid civil or criminal liability, if the prosecution can prove the remaining essential elements of the offense.

=== Civil law ===
In civil law cases, such as a dispute over a contract or a claim about an accidental injury, the burden of proof usually requires the plaintiff to convince the trier of fact (whether judge or jury) of the plaintiff's entitlement to the relief sought. This means that the plaintiff must prove each element of the claim, or cause of action, in order to recover.

This rule is not absolute in civil lawsuits; unlike with criminal offenses, laws may establish a different burden of proof, or the burden in an individual case may be reversed as a matter of fairness. For example, if a bank or government agency has a legal duty to keep certain records, and a lawsuit alleges that the proper records were not kept, then the plaintiff may not be required to prove a negative; instead, the respondent could be required to prove to the court that the records were kept.

=== Civil cases of the U.S. Supreme Court ===
In Keyes v. Sch. Dist. No. 1, the United States Supreme Court stated: "There are no hard-and-fast standards governing the allocation of the burden of proof in every situation. The issue, rather, 'is merely a question of policy and fairness based on experience in the different situations'." For support, the Court cited 9 John H. Wigmore, Evidence § 2486, at 275 (3d ed. 1940). In Keyes, the Supreme Court held that if "school authorities have been found to have practiced purposeful segregation in part of a school system", the burden of persuasion shifts to the school to prove that it did not engage in such discrimination in other segregated schools in the same system.

In Director, Office of Workers' Compensation Programs v. Greenwich Collieries, the Supreme Court explained that "burden of proof" is ambiguous because it has historically referred to two distinct burdens: the burden of persuasion, and the burden of production.

The Supreme Court discussed how courts should allocate the burden of proof (i.e., the burden of persuasion) in Schaffer ex rel. Schaffer v. Weast. The Supreme Court explained that if a statute is silent about the burden of persuasion, the court will "begin with the ordinary default rule that plaintiffs bear the risk of failing to prove their claims". In support of this proposition, the Court cited 2 J. Strong, McCormick on Evidence § 337, 412 (5th ed. 1999), which states:

The burdens of pleading and proof with regard to most facts have been and should be assigned to the plaintiff who generally seeks to change the present state of affairs and who therefore naturally should be expected to bear the risk of failure of proof or persuasion.

At the same time, the Supreme Court also recognized "The ordinary default rule, of course, admits of exceptions. ... For example, the burden of persuasion as to certain elements of a plaintiff's claim may be shifted to defendants, when such elements can fairly be characterized as affirmative defenses or exemptions. ... Under some circumstances this Court has even placed the burden of persuasion over an entire claim on the defendant. ... [Nonetheless,] [a]bsent some reason to believe that Congress intended otherwise, therefore, [the Supreme Court] will conclude that the burden of persuasion lies where it usually falls, upon the party seeking relief."

== See also ==
- Philosophic burden of proof
- Probative
- Rebuttable presumption
- Shifting burden of persuasion

== Bibliography ==
- Cooper, S. (2003). "Human Rights and Legal Burdens of Proof". Web Journal of Current Legal Issues. 3.
