= Rasita Khapacheva =

Russian cosmetologist (born 1995)

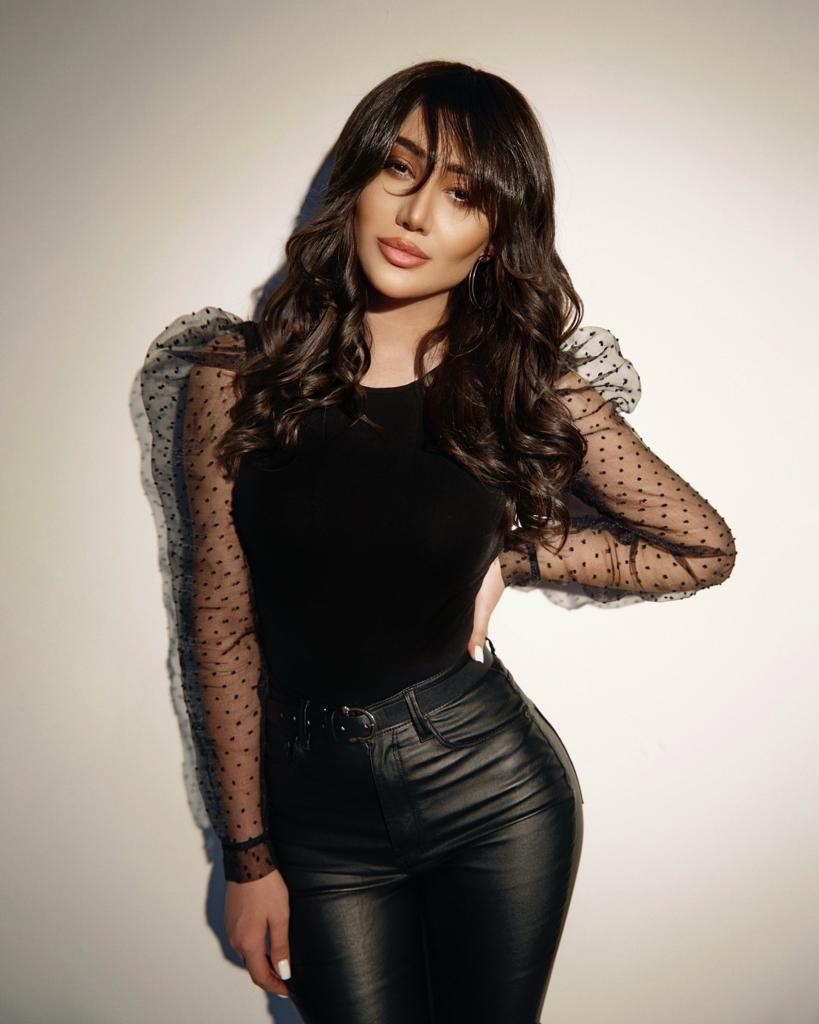
- Born: October 30, 1995 (age 30); Adygea, Russia
- Occupation: doctor
- Years active: 2019-

Rasita Khapacheva is a Russian cosmetologist, plastic surgeon, teacher, public figure, expert on Channel One Russia.

She is best known for regularly participating in all international meetings, representing Russia in other countries. She is one of the main trendsetters in Russia, imports the latest techniques and works in cosmetology and is herself the author of contouring techniques. Conducts the first and only training in Russia on the technique of "Increasing and removing lip volume in one procedure". And also the fact that she set a record in cosmetology, serving 72 patients in 8 hours.

== Biography ==
Rasita was born in 1995 in the Republic of Adygea.In 2019, she graduated from Kuban State Medical University in Krasnodare with a degree in "Medical Science". In 2021 she graduated from MGMU named after. Sechenov in the specialty "Plastic surgery". Record

On July 16, 2021 she set a record in cosmetology at the world level and in Russian. She was officially awarded with a statuette and a certificate at the annual ceremony of awarding the main record holders of the country and the world "SOLAR" in the hotel "Metropol".

Khapacheva is the owner of the largest number of subscribers on Instagram in Russia in cosmetology – more than 1 million subscribers. She has impressive success throughout Russia mainly by becoming the main cosmetologist for media personalities, top social media bloggers, as well as the participants of the Dom-2.
