= Vunilagi v. The Queen =

- Court: High Court of Australia
- Citation: [2023] HCA 24

Case history
- Prior actions: Vunilagi v The Queen [2021] ACTCA 12, 17 ACTLR 72

Case opinions
- Section 68BA of the Supreme Court Act 1933 (ACT) was not invalid due to section 80 of the Constitution or the rule in Kable. Accordingly, a trial held under that provision before a judge sitting alone for an indictable offence against a law made by the Legislative Assembly of the Australian Capital Territory was valid.

Vunilagi v The Queen is a significant decision of the High Court of Australia concerning the nature of the laws of the self-governing Territories.

It is relevant to Australian constitutional law due to its application of the Kable doctrine, as well as for its finding that section 80 of the Australian Constitution does not require indictable offences under the laws of the ACT to be tried by jury.

The appeal concerned the constitutional validity of a provision in the Supreme Court Act 1933 (ACT). In reaction to the pandemic the ACT Supreme Court had suspended jury trials. The following day the legislative section s68BA was added to the act, empowering the court to order trial by judge alone without consent of the accused; for the duration of the pandemic.

Vulnilagi was convicted and argued on appeal that these provisions were invalid. His appeal was dismissed by the ACT Court of Appeal.

He then appealed to the High court, which held that the Kable doctrine did not render the legislation invalid. This was in part because the legislation required judges to exercise discretion in deciding whether or not to force a jury trial; and because the exercise of that discretion allowed for the accused to submit arguments about how it should be exercised, meaning that procedural fairness was given to the accused.

The court additionally held that the legislation did not infringe s80 of the constitution. The basis for this finding was that the section did not apply as the laws weren't Commonwealth indictable offences; and instead were laws of the ACT.
