= Youssef Fares =

Youssef Fares may refer to:

- Youssef Fares (sport shooter) (1906–?), Egyptian sports shooter
- Youssef Fares (neurosurgeon), Lebanese neurosurgeon, academic and healthcare leader
