= Garry David =

Australian criminal (1954–1993)

- Born: Garry Ian Patrick David; 20 November 1954; Melbourne, Victoria, Australia
- Died: 11 July 1993 (aged 38); Victoria, Australia
- Other name: Garry Webb
- Conviction: Attempted murder during a robbery

Garry Ian Patrick David (20 November 1954 – 11 July 1993) (also known as Garry Webb), was an Australian criminal.

== Early life ==
David's father Rupert David, was a habitual criminal and pedophile, who served time in prison and psychiatric hospitals, his mother Betty David was an alcoholic David and his siblings were placed in an orphanage when he was four. From that time until 1972, when he escaped from legal custody, he spent his life in a number of orphanages, boys' homes and youth training centres.

At the age of 11 David began committing various offences including larceny, making threats and offences of dishonesty. When he was 13, he was first diagnosed as having a personality disorder with psychopathic traits. David was subsequently admitted to psychiatric facilities on eight occasions between 1976 and 1984, and was diagnosed with antisocial personality disorder. It was during this time that he began self-mutilating to an extreme degree. Among other things, he swallowed razor blades, cut off parts of his ears and his left nipple, injured his genitals, hammered nails into his feet and swallowed corrosive liquids.

== Imprisonment ==
In 1982 David was sentenced to 14 years' imprisonment for the attempted murder of three people, during a robbery-gone-wrong at a pizza restaurant in Rye, Victoria. The robbery appeared to be an attempt to draw police into a shootout. The pizza shop owner and one of the responding police officers were severely wounded in the incident, while David was wounded in the legs by police. A news crew spotted David fleeing the scene and he was arrested.

Whilst imprisoned, David wrote many manuscripts, one titled Blueprint for Urban Warfare, which spoke of committing massacres upon his release from prison. The "Blueprint" listed 49 "combat situations", ranging from horror movie clichés (cigarette machines dispensing severed fingers, drink machines dispensing blood) to far more disturbing scenarios, such as the bombing of bridges and public buildings, the assassination of prominent politicians, the poisoning of water supplies and indiscriminate shooting in public places. David later claimed that he had been instructed to write his more graphic fantasies down as a form of therapy. He also manifested a great deal of hostility to the police force and prison system, resorting to violence and self-mutilation whenever his requests or demands were not met. In January 1990, David was declared mentally ill by government health department officials. The Mental Health Act 1986 entitled David the right to appeal, which he did in February and March 1990. In May 1990 the board found David was not mentally ill and recommended he be discharged as an involuntary patient. This was a consequence of the Board's assertion that a personality disorder is not a mental illness as per the Mental Health Act.

=== Community Protection Act ===
The Victorian Government faced the dilemma of respecting David's right to freedom and the protection of the community upon his release from prison. The government sought to keep David imprisoned indefinitely by introducing the Community Protection Act 1990. That legislation gave Victorian Supreme Court judges the power to hold David in "preventative detention" for twelve months if the judge was convinced by evidence before them that David was still a risk to the community and likely to commit further offences if released from prison.

David was an intelligent man, with significant literary, analytical and computer skills. But as he had a long history of responding to the most minor frustrations with violence, damage to property and self-harm, and refused on principle to co-operate with attempts to reduce such behaviours prior to his re-entry to society, the Supreme Court repeatedly applied the legislation to continue his confinement.

== Suicide ==
David, then aged 38, committed suicide by ingesting razor blades that led to peritonitis; he died on 11 June 1993. At the time of his death aged 38, David was still a prisoner and had spent a total of 33 years in various institutions.

== Afterword ==
A similar act was passed by the Parliament of New South Wales in an attempt to enforce similar preventative detention against a named individual. This act was challenged in Kable v Director of Public Prosecutions (NSW) and overturned as unconstitutional.

The song, “He's On The Run” by Gene Bradley Fisk was written about David.

== See also ==
- List of Australian criminals
