= Fares Scale of Injuries due to Cluster Munitions =

Medical classification of functional impairment

- Synonyms: Fares Scale of Injuries
- Purpose: Assessment of injuries based on functional impairment

The Fares Scale of Injuries due to Cluster Munitions is an anatomical and neuropsychological classification method to identify and describe injury scales for victims of cluster munitions. It was published in 2013 by Lebanese physicians, Jawad Fares and Youssef Fares.

== Elements of the scale ==
Fares Scale of Injuries due to Cluster Munitions
Grade Level	Percentage of Functional Disability	Anatomical Lesion
Grade I	≤25%	Amputation of three fingers: middle finger, ring finger and/or little finger Partial loss of a hand or foot Superficial wounds to the body and face Loss of skin and/or muscles in the extremities
Grade II	50%	Amputation of two fingers: one of the two is the thumb Loss of an eye, leg and/or hand Wound infection Recuperable lesion in abdomen and/or thorax Psychological effects
Grade III	75%	Affection of more than two of the four extremities Partial loss of vision and/or impairment of the auditory system Mutilation and partial damage to the digestive system and /or lungs Lesion of the spinal cord
Grade IV	>75%	Amputation of three extremities Total loss of vision and/or auditory capacity Tetraplegia; Intellectual incapacity

== Interpretation ==
The scale assesses the severity of injuries resulting from cluster munitions based on functional impairment. Due to the polytraumatic nature of the injuries and the damage to multiple systems in the body, the scale stratifies cohorts by exploring the limitation in activity resulting from the injury. Following a grading system (I-IV): Grade I shows functional impairment of less than 25%, Grade II shows 50%, Grade III shows 75%, and Grade IV demonstrates more than 75% functional impairment. Grading is done after meticulous and conjoint assessment of symptoms and functioning.

== History ==
During the 2006 Lebanon War, it was estimated that "Israel rained as many as 4.6 million submunitions [of cluster munitions] across southern Lebanon in at least 962 separate strikes, the vast majority over the final three days of the war when Israel knew a settlement was imminent", almost one million of which remained unexploded. These unexploded ordnances continued to injure and kill civilians after the war ended. Injuries were polytraumatic and often led to disability and significant neuropsychological effects. Research by Jawad Fares and Youssef Fares led to the development of the “Fares Scale of Injuries due to Cluster Munitions” to assess injuries based on functional impairment. The scale helped in classifying the wounds of victims and determining the best possible treatment.
