= Child sexual abuse in Australia =

Child sexual abuse is a matter of concern in Australia, and is the subject of investigation and prosecution under the law, and of academic study into its prevalence, causes and social implications.

== Prevalence ==
According to a report that recorded the types of child abuse reported in Australian states and territories in 2011–12, there were 48,420 substantiated cases of child endangerment, of which 5,828 were cases of sexual abuse. Recent relevant cases include Madden v Callanan [2016] FCCA 59; Hughes v R [2015] NSWCCA 330; R v Maurice Van Ryn [2016] NSWCCA 1.

Evidence from reports indicate that the majority of sexual assaults in Australia are undertaken by perpetrators known to the victims. According to a 2009 report by the Australian Bureau of Statistics, 42% of sexual assaults reported to law enforcement agencies in Australia that year took place against children under the age of 14; this statistic includes sexual assaults that adults said were committed against them when they were under the age of 14. The percentage of cases in which the child had a familial relationship with the perpetrator were: 26% of cases in southern Australia, over 20% of cases in the Australian Capital Territory and Tasmania, 39% of cases in New South Wales, and 30% of cases in Queensland.

In March 2014, the Australian Broadcasting Corporation (ABC) reported that police had identified about 30 to 40 children under the care of the Department of Human Services of Victoria who have been abused by paedophile gangs.

In March 2006, the ABC aired a show that contained allegations of large amount of child sexual abuse with Aboriginal communities. As a reaction, the government commissioned a report into child sexual abuse in the Northern Territory, which developed a report with recommendations. From this, there were a series of legislation passed that came to be known as "the intervention", as the government was intervening with these Northern Territory communities. However, this received widespread criticism and has been largely unsuccessful.

== Other studies ==
Child sexual abuse has been connected to later emotional and behavioural problems in victims, and to an increased tendency toward alcoholism, depression, mental illness, and suicide. In 2007 the Queensland Children's Commission reported that "[s]ome 70% of psychiatric patients are known to have been sexually abused as children". A study carried out in 27 prisons in New South Wales found that 65% of male and female prisoners had been sexually and physically abused as children.

== Notable cases ==
- Dante Arthurs (born 1984) – raped and murdered a child in a shopping centre in 2007. Sentenced to life in prison with a minimum term of 13 years.
- Robert Bropho (1930–2011) – an Australian Aboriginal rights activist and convicted serial child sex offender from Perth, Western Australia. He was jailed for three years in 2008; however, the Court of Appeals extended the term to six years. He died while serving a six-year sentence.
- Michael Guider (1950–2024) – sentenced for multiple instances of child sexual assault.
- Jack Perry (1916–2006) – convicted in 1994 of sex offences against a minor.
- Robert Hughes (born 1948) – actor, convicted in 2014.
- Gerald Ridsdale (1934–2025) – Catholic priest, convicted of multiple child sexual offences.
- Steve Randell (born 1956) – former Australian Test cricket match umpire whose cricket and professional careers ended when he was convicted in August 1999 of 15 separate counts of sexual assault against nine schoolgirls between 1981 and 1982. He was sentenced to four years' imprisonment with a two-year minimum, and was released on parole in May 2002.
- Brian Keith Jones (born 1947) – in 1981, he was sentenced to 14 years' imprisonment with a non-parole period of 12 years. In 2006, he was sentenced to an indefinite term for breaching the parole conditions.
- Robert 'Dolly' Dunn (1941–2009) – a school teacher working for the Marist Brothers, a Catholic religious order. He had committed 24 sexual offences against young boys over a 10-year period to 1995. Charges also included three drug charges. In 2001, he was sentenced to 30 years' imprisonment with a non-parole period of 22 and a half years.
- Dennis Ferguson (1948–2012) – in 1988, he kidnapped and sexually abused three children, and was sentenced to 14 years' imprisonment.
- William Kamm (born 1950) – Protestant cult leader, convicted of child sexual abuse, sentenced to five years' imprisonment for sexually assaulting a girl.
- Terry Martin (born 1957) – Tasmanian parliamentarian, on 21 November 2011 was convicted of creating child pornography and having sex with a 12-year-old girl.
- Graeme Mundine (born 1960) – inaugural chair and executive officer of the National Aboriginal and Torres Strait Islander Catholic Council. Co-authored the Catholic Church’s response to the 1997 Bringing Them Home Report on the Stolen Generations. Sentenced to three years in prison with an 18-month non-parole period for offences relating to five male victims in the 1980s.

== See also ==
- Category:Child sexual abuse in Australia
- Royal Commission into Institutional Responses to Child Sexual Abuse
- Royal Commission into the New South Wales Police Service § Paedophilia/pederasty enquiry
- Catholic Church sexual abuse cases in Australia
- Child pornography laws in Australia
