= Shifting burden of persuasion =

The shifting burden of persuasion is the process of transferring the obligation to prove a fact in an issue raised during a lawsuit from one party to the other party. When the party initially bearing the burden of proof has presented sufficient evidence to support its claim then it becomes the responsibility of the other party to issue a rebuttal that provides defensive evidence.
