= Knight v Victoria =

- Court: High Court of Australia
- Citation: [2017] HCA 29; 261 CLR 306

Court membership
- Judges sitting: Kiefel CJ, Bell, Gageler, Keane, Nettle, Gordon and Edelman JJ

Case opinions
- Appeal dismissed

Knight v Victoria is a landmark decision of the High Court of Australia.

The case dealt with the constitutionality of some sections within the Corrections Amendment (Parole) Act 2014 (Vic), enacted to prevent convicted murderer Julian Knight from being eligible for parole. The legislation had retrospective effect, and named Julian in its text to legally deny him release from prison until close to death.

The High Court unanimously held that the original exercise of judicial power imposing Knight's minimum parole period was separate from the decision of whether parole should be granted. It decided that, because of this, the legislation did not affect an exercise of judicial power, and so could not be found unconstitutional for having breached the separation of powers doctrine.

== Facts ==
Julian Knight, known as the "Hoddle Street Massacre" shooter, was convicted of murdering seven people and injuring 19 others in Melbourne, Australia in 1987. He was sentenced to life imprisonment with a minimum non-parole period of 27 years.

In 2014, as Knight's minimum term was nearing its end, the Victorian Parliament passed the Corrections Amendment (Parole) Act 2014 (Vic). The legislation effectively made Knight ineligible for parole unless the Adult Parole Board was satisfied that he was in imminent danger of dying or seriously incapacitated and thus no longer posed a risk to the community.

Knight challenged the constitutionality of the legislation, arguing that it violated the Kable doctrine. In essence, he argued that the State legislation was unconstitutional on separation of powers grounds because it required courts to act in a manner incompatible with their institutional integrity as Chapter III courts.

== Judgment ==
Knight argued that s74AA of the act interfered with the Victorian Supreme Court by replacing a "party-specific judicial judgement" about parole eligibility with a "party-specific legislative judgement". He invited the court to distinguish Crump v NSW (a case that had held similar legislation was valid) on the basis that he was the sole target of s74AA. The court declined to do so as it did not find the distinction meaningful.

The court found that the legislation did not affect the sentence imposed on Knight. This was because the original judgement provided authority to imprison him for life and the minimum sentence merely setting the period for parole eligibility. The decision to grant parole itself was held to be outside of the scope of the exercise of judicial power by the original sentencing judge. The court stated:

The section did not replace a judicial judgment with a legislative judgment. It does not intersect at all with the exercise of judicial power that has occurred - _{KIEFEL CJ, BELL, GAGELER, KEANE, NETTLE, GORDON AND EDELMAN JJ, at [29]}

The court then declined to engage with Knight's second argument that s74AA violated Ch III by requiring that it required judges participate in functions incompatible with their status as federal judicial officers. It declined to engage with his argument because the board at the time did not have a judge as a member, and neither did the statute require one to sit on the board.

Following its rejection of Knight's main arguments, the High Court unanimously dismissed Knight's challenge.

== Aftermath ==
Following the decision, Julian Knight remained ineligible for parole. As of 2024, he remains incarcerated.

== Significance ==
Sarah Murray in the UWA Law Review pointed to the decision as supporting that "parole lacks the same constitutional limits of the Kable-guarded judicature, even in cases where parole legislation is ad hominem and has the practical effect of removing parole eligibility".

== See also ==
- Kable v DPP
- Hoddle Street massacre
