= Kathlyn Fares =

American politician (born 1942)

Member of the Missouri House of Representatives from the 91st district
- In office January 3, 2001 – January 7, 2009
- Preceded by: Emmy McClelland
- Succeeded by: Jeanne Kirkton

Personal details
- Born: September 7, 1942 (age 83) Kansas City, Missouri
- Party: Republican

Kathlyn Fares (born September 7, 1942) is an American politician who served in the Missouri House of Representatives from the 91st district from 2001 to 2009.
