= Craig v South Australia =

Judgement of the High Court of Australia

- Court: High Court of Australia
- Full case name: ANTHONY DAVID CRAIG v. THE STATE OF SOUTH AUSTRALIA
- Decided: 1995
- Citation: 184 CLR 163

Court membership
- Judges sitting: Brennan CJ, Deane, Toohey, Gaudron, and McHugh JJ

Case opinions
- Appeal allowed the trial judge did not make a jurisdictional error Brennan CJ, Deane, Toohey, Gaudron, and McHugh JJ

Craig v South Australia is a decision of the High Court of Australia.

It is an important case in Australian Administrative Law, particularly for the court's discussion of jurisdictional error as it applies to courts versus tribunals.

According to LawCite, Craig v South Australia has been cited the seventeenth most times of any High Court decision.

== Facts ==
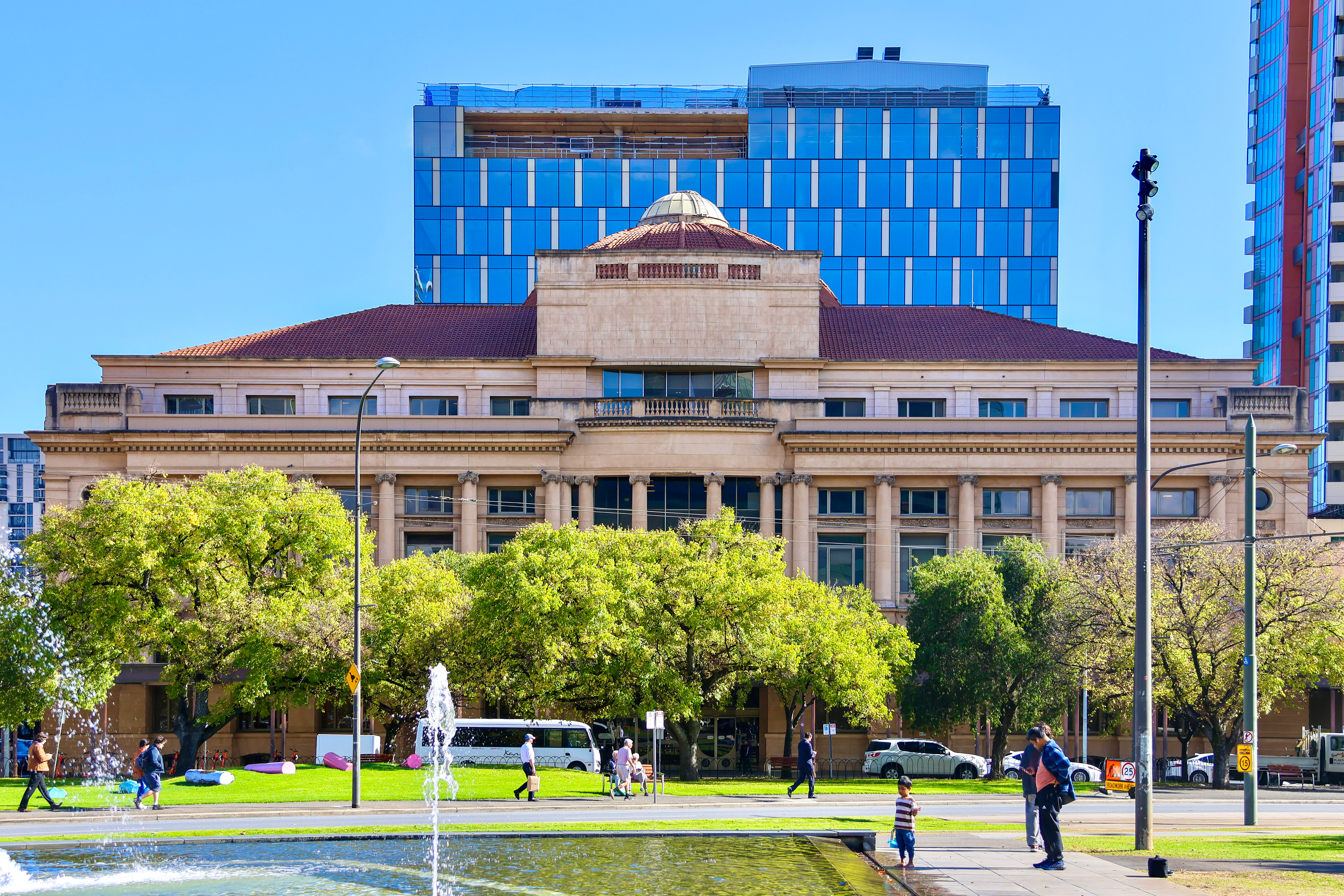
The Sir Samuel Way Building, housing the District Court of South Australia, as viewed from Victoria Square.

Mr Craig was charged with offences in the District Court of South Australia. The maximum penalty for each charge was five years or more.

As he lacked counsel, Craig made a Dietrich application. (Note: A Dietrich application is a request that a court postpone proceedings until an accused is provided with adequate legal representation by the government. Such a request will only be granted if certain conditions are met; including that it not be the fault of the accused that counsel can't be obtained.) He succeeded. Judge Russell found that Craig could not receive a fair trial without the assistance of counsel, and the unavailability of counsel was not Craig's fault. He ruled that the trial be adjourned until legal representation made available.

One month later, the matter was relisted before Judge Russel at the request of the Crown. Crown counsel conveyed their instructions from the Attorney-General that the government did not intend to provide Craig with legal aid. In light of this, Judge Russel stayed the proceedings subject to further orders.

South Australia then applied at the Supreme Court to have Judge Russel's order quashed by writ of certiorari. That application was granted by majority, who concluded that the judge had made a jurisdictional error.

Craig then obtained special leave at the High Court.

== Judgement ==
The High Court unanimously held that the trial judge had made no jurisdictional error, nor an error of law on the face of the record. His initial orders were upheld.

In its remarks, the court went on to describe jurisdictional error. It drew a distinction between tribunals and courts in how the concept is to be applied in Australia, writing:

'In considering what constitutes ‘jurisdictional error’, it is necessary to distinguish between, on the one hand, the inferior courts which are amenable to certiorari and, on the other, those other tribunals exercising governmental powers which are also amenable to the writ.

At least in the absence of a contrary intent in the statute or other instrument which established it, an administrative tribunal lacks authority either to authoritatively determine questions of law or to make an order or decision otherwise than in accordance with the law... [C]onstitutional limitations arising from the doctrine of the separation of judicial and executive powers may preclude legislative competence to confer judicial power upon an administrative tribunal. If such an administrative tribunal falls into an error of law which causes it to identify a wrong issue, to ask itself a wrong question, to ignore relevant material, to rely on irrelevant material or, at least in some circumstances, to make an erroneous finding or to reach a mistaken conclusion, and the tribunal’s exercise or purported exercise of power is thereby affected, it exceeds its authority or powers. Such an error of law is jurisdictional error which will invalidate any order or decision of the tribunal which reflects it.

In contrast, the ordinary jurisdiction of a court of law encompasses authority to decide questions of law, as well as questions of fact, involved in matters which it has jurisdiction to determine. The identification of relevant issues, the formulation of relevant questions and the determination of what is and what is not relevant evidence are all routine steps in the discharge of that ordinary jurisdiction. Demonstrable mistake in the identification of such issues or the formulation of such questions will commonly involve error of law which may, if an appeal is available and is pursued, be corrected by an appellate court and, depending on the circumstances, found an order setting aside the order or decision of the inferior court. Such a mistake on the part of an inferior court entrusted with authority to identify, formulate and determine such issues and questions will not, however, ordinarily constitute jurisdictional error. Similarly, a failure by an inferior court to take into account some matter which it was, as a matter of law, required to take into account in determining a question within jurisdiction or reliance by such a court upon some irrelevant matter upon which it was, as a matter of law, not entitled to rely in determining such a question will not ordinarily involve jurisdictional error' - Brennan CJ, Deane, Toohey, Gaudron, and McHugh JJ

== Significance ==
In an address to the Australian Institute of Administrative Law forum, Kristen Walker QC has noted Craig as often being the 'starting point' in discussions of jurisdictional error in Australia. Its distinction between jurisdictional error as applied in the executive versus juridical context has remained influential.

Craig additionally marks a point of divergence for Administrative Law as it applies to Australia and the UK. This is due to the High Court's decision in Craig not to follow the UK line of authority articulated in Anisminic; which among other things, abolished the distinction between jurisdictional and non-jurisdictional error.

There have been multiple significant developments in the law since Craig. Kristen Walker has categorized these subsequent developments as encompassing;

(a) the constitutionalisation of review for jurisdictional error; (Note: The constitutional entrenchment of review of federal administrative decisions on the basis of jurisdictional error was recognised in Plaintiff S157/2002 v Commonwealth) (Note: State governments were held to be unable to enforce privative clauses upon their courts in Kirk v Industrial Relations Commission of New South Wales)

(b) the nature of jurisdictional error; (Note: Kristin Walker noted that in addition to the categories of jurisdictional error for administrative bodies articulated in Craig, one might now add: (a) irrationality or illogicality, (b) mistaken denial of jurisdiction; (c) failure to deal with an integer of a claim; (d) bad faith; (e) improper purpose; and (f) acting under dictation/inflexible application of policy)

(c) the consequences of jurisdictional error; (Note: It was held in Bhardwaj (2002) that if a purported decision is affected by jurisdictional error, it is regarded as no decision at all) and

(d) the differences in this area of law between administrative bodies and courts. (Note: some parts of the joint judgment in Kirk suggested that the distinction between courts and administrative bodies was unhelpful)

== See also ==
- List of High Court of Australia cases
- Plaintiff S157/2002 v Commonwealth of Australia
