= Sadeg Faris =

- Born: 1946 (age 79–80); Tripoli, Libya
- Education: University of California, Berkeley
- Occupations: Engineer and entrepreneur
- Title: CEO of Reveo, Inc
- Children: 4

Sadeg M. Faris is a Libyan-American engineer and entrepreneur.

== Early life and education ==
Sadeg Faris was brought up in Tripoli in a poor family. His father died when he was ten years old and he was raised with his mother. He won a scholarship from Esso Libya to go to college in the US.

Faris received his B.S., M.S., and Ph.D. degrees in 1969, 1971 and 1976 in Electrical Engineering and Computer Sciences, from the University of California, Berkeley. His PhD thesis project was completed in 1976 and was called "Characteristics of Metal-Barrier-Metal Diodes and Their Applications".

== Career ==
Upon graduating from Berkeley Faris joined the IBM Thomas J. Watson Research Center labs in Yorktown, NY, and became part of a group working on developing chips exploiting the Josephson effect. In 1983 while he was at IBM he proposed the "quiteron," a superconducting three-terminal, three layer switching device similar to a transistor. It was distinct from superconductive Josephson junctions, and was instead designed on principles of quantum tunneling by injecting quasiparticles through the two thin insulator layers separating the three superconducting layers. The original quiteron consisted of three superconducting layers. Two layers were made of niobium, the third of lead-indium-gold alloy. They were insulated with silicon monoxide and niobium oxide layers. As of 2011 quiterons were not commercially used.

In the fall of 1983 IBM shut down its efforts to develop chips based on superconductive Josephson junctions, as did Bell Labs and Sperry at around the same time.

In April 1983 Faris had left IBM to found Hypres to commercialize work he had done at IBM; the company licensed patents from IBM. Hypres at first developed and sold a Josephson sampling oscilloscope and later became a low-temperature superconductor foundry.

In 1990 Faris founded Reveo with a vision of following Thomas Edison's model of applying science to generate new products, and spinning them out into new companies.

In October 2003 Reveo and the Government of Malaysia started a research and development centre named InventQjaya; the goal of the government was to achieve technological sovereignty by 2020. The arrangements were based on Faris' relationship with Mahathir Mohamad, who was then the prime minister. The center was set up a wholly owned subsidiary of Reveo and was funded by the government; the government committed to a total of RM437mil in funding and had made RM228mil available as of February 2005, when the government froze the accounts of InventQjaya. The accounts were frozen based on allegations made by the Malaysian independent directors who had been appointed to the board of InventQjaya that Faris' claims about the technology he wanted to commercialize through InventQjaya might be fraudulent, as well as claims by InventQjaya's recently fired chief financial officer that RM50mil in funds had been inappropriately transferred to Reveo. The seizure order was lifted in January 2006.

By 2007, Reveo said that it had spun out four companies: eVionyx in New York and Taiwan for metal fuel cells, VRex in New York for 3-D stereoscopic imaging, purOgen in New York for oxygen separation technology, and Chelix in California for cholesteric liquid crystal applications.

As of 2008, Reveo was developing a single molecule DNA sequencing technology that used physical probes, each tuned to one of four frequencies, to sense nucleotides.

In 2009 the New York Intellectual Property Law Association named him 2009 Inventor of the Year.

== Older life ==
Sadeg Faris lives with his family in NYC.
