= Kirk v Industrial Relations Commission of New South Wales =

2010 High Court of Australia decision

- Court: High Court of Australia
- Citation: [2010] HCA 1; 239 CLR 531

Court membership
- Judges sitting: French CJ, Gummow, Hayne, Crennan, Kiefel, and Bell JJ Heydon J

Case opinions
- Appeal allowed

Kirk v Industrial Relations Commission of New South Wales is a landmark decision of the High Court of Australia that dealt with the constitutional limits on State Courts' powers and the doctrine of jurisdictional error.

The case has had a significant impact on Australian administrative law. It has partially clarified the extent to which State Parliaments can limit the exercise of judicial power by courts within their jurisdiction.

== Facts ==
In 2001, a fatal accident occurred on a rural property owned by Graeme Kirk, involving an employee who was operating a Polaris ATV. The WorkCover Authority of New South Wales investigated the incident and charged Kirk and his company, Kirk Group Holdings Pty Ltd, with breaches of occupational health and safety legislation. In 2004, the Industrial Court of New South Wales convicted Kirk and his company, imposing fines.

Kirk appealed to the Industrial Relations Commission of New South Wales, arguing that the Industrial Court had made errors in law in its decision. The Commission dismissed the appeal, and Kirk subsequently sought judicial review in the Supreme Court of New South Wales. The Supreme Court held that it did not have the power to review the commission's decision due to provisions in the Industrial Relations Act 1996 (NSW), which limited its jurisdiction to do so (Such as s179 of the IR Act, which contained a privative clause).

Kirk then appealed to the High Court of Australia, arguing that the provisions in the Industrial Relations Act that restricted the Supreme Court's ability to review the commission's decision were constitutionally invalid, as they were inconsistent with the Constitution's requirement that State Supreme Courts exercise federal judicial power.

== Judgement ==
The High Court, in a unanimous decision, allowed Kirk's appeal. The Court held that the provisions in the Industrial Relations Act that restricted the Supreme Court's jurisdiction to review the commission's decision were constitutionally invalid. The Court found that Chapter III of Australia's constitution, by implication, prevents State Parliaments from enacting legislation that would excessively limit or exclude the supervisory jurisdiction of State Supreme Courts over decisions made by inferior courts and tribunals.

Speaking as to these limits, the court noted that:

This is not to say that there can be no legislation affecting the availability of judicial review in the State Supreme Courts. It is not to say that no privative provision is valid. Rather, the observations made about the constitutional significance of the supervisory jurisdiction of the State Supreme Courts point to the continued need for, and utility of, the distinction between jurisdictional and non‑jurisdictional error in the Australian constitutional context. The distinction marks the relevant limit on State legislative power. Legislation which would take from a State Supreme Court power to grant relief on account of jurisdictional error is beyond State legislative power. Legislation which denies the availability of relief for non‑jurisdictional error of law appearing on the face of the record is not beyond power.
_{French CJ, Gummow, Hayne, Crennan, Kiefel, and Bell JJ, at [100]}

It also found that Walton J of the Industrial Court had made a jurisdictional error in their original decision, and so had wrongly convicted Kirk and his company. As a result, the High Court quashed the convictions and set aside the fines imposed on Kirk and his company.

== Significance ==
Kirk is a landmark case in Australian administrative law, as it has significantly influenced the relationship between State Courts and administrative decision-makers. The case has elaborated upon the extent to which State Courts can exercise judicial review of administrative decisions and has provided greater certainty about the scope of jurisdictional error. One commentator described the case as 'breathing life into Kable', in reference to Kable v DPP.

The decision has reinforced the role of Australia's State Supreme Courts in ensuring that administrative decision-makers act within the limits of their legal authority. By preventing State Parliaments from enacting legislation that would limit or exclude the supervisory jurisdiction of State Supreme Courts over decisions made by inferior courts and tribunals, the case in some respects has strengthened the role of Australian courts in enforcing administrative law.

== See also ==
- Australian administrative law
- Craig v South Australia
- Kable v Director of Public Prosecutions
