= Gene Bradley Fisk =

- Born: August 20, 1935 (age 89); Colac, Victoria, Australia
- Genres: Country
- Occupation(s): Musician, songwriter, radio personality
- Years active: 1947–present

Gene Bradley Fisk, born 1935 in Colac, Victoria is an Australian country singer. His interest in music began when he joined a banjo club at age 11, playing concerts and radio shows.

== Biography ==
Fisk formed his first band called 'The Sidewinders' in 1959. He served in the Royal Australian Air Force for 15 years before embarking on a career in radio as an announcer with 3HA 3CV. 3BO /3UZ and 3GL.

He entered the Royal Australian Air Force as an engineering apprentice in 1951 and served for 15 years, which included overseas posting to Malaysia and Thailand.

He began his broadcasting career at Butterworth Malaysia at Radio RAAF in 1960 as one of their first announcers. On completion of military service, Fish became a Disc Jockey on commercial radio at 3HA Hamilton, Victoria in 1967 and went on to 3CV Maryborough, Victoria, 3BO Bendigo, Victoria and 3GL Geelong, Victoria.

At 3UZ in Melbourne he hosted a top rated Country Music program from 1977 until 1980 followed by country music programs on 3GL Geelong and community stations 3CCC Bendigo, 3PBS Melbourne and 3YYR Geelong in the 1980s and 1990s.

Fisk was a founding member of Country FM radio in Geelong a 24-hour Country Music station from 1994 until it closed in 2005. At Country FM, he was production/music director and an announcer. In 2014 he commenced broadcasting a one-hour all Australasian country music show “OZ Country” on Highlands FM Woodend, Victoria, and from May 2018 has been broadcasting the program on WYN FM Werribee Vic. It is also heard on OCR FM Colac and Apollo Bay, Highlands FM and 88FM Castlemaine Vic.

Fisk currently resides in Geelong, Victoria, . His daughter, Donna Fisk, is also a successful country entertainer.

== Awards ==
- 1999 – Inducted into the Country Music Broadcasters Hall of Fame
- 2001 - Victoria Country Music Awards: Male Vocal, Best Independent release Best Duo Open Section & Best Duo Victorian (with his daughter Donna Fisk)
- 2003 - Australian Independent Country Music Awards: Best Heritage Track of the Year for 'Kidman'
- 2005 – Inducted into the Country Music 'Hands of Fame'
