= Kuban State Medical University =

- Кубанский государственный медицинский университет
- Type: Public
- Established: 1920
- Location: Krasnodar, Russian Federation
- Website: http://www.ksma.ru/
- Building details
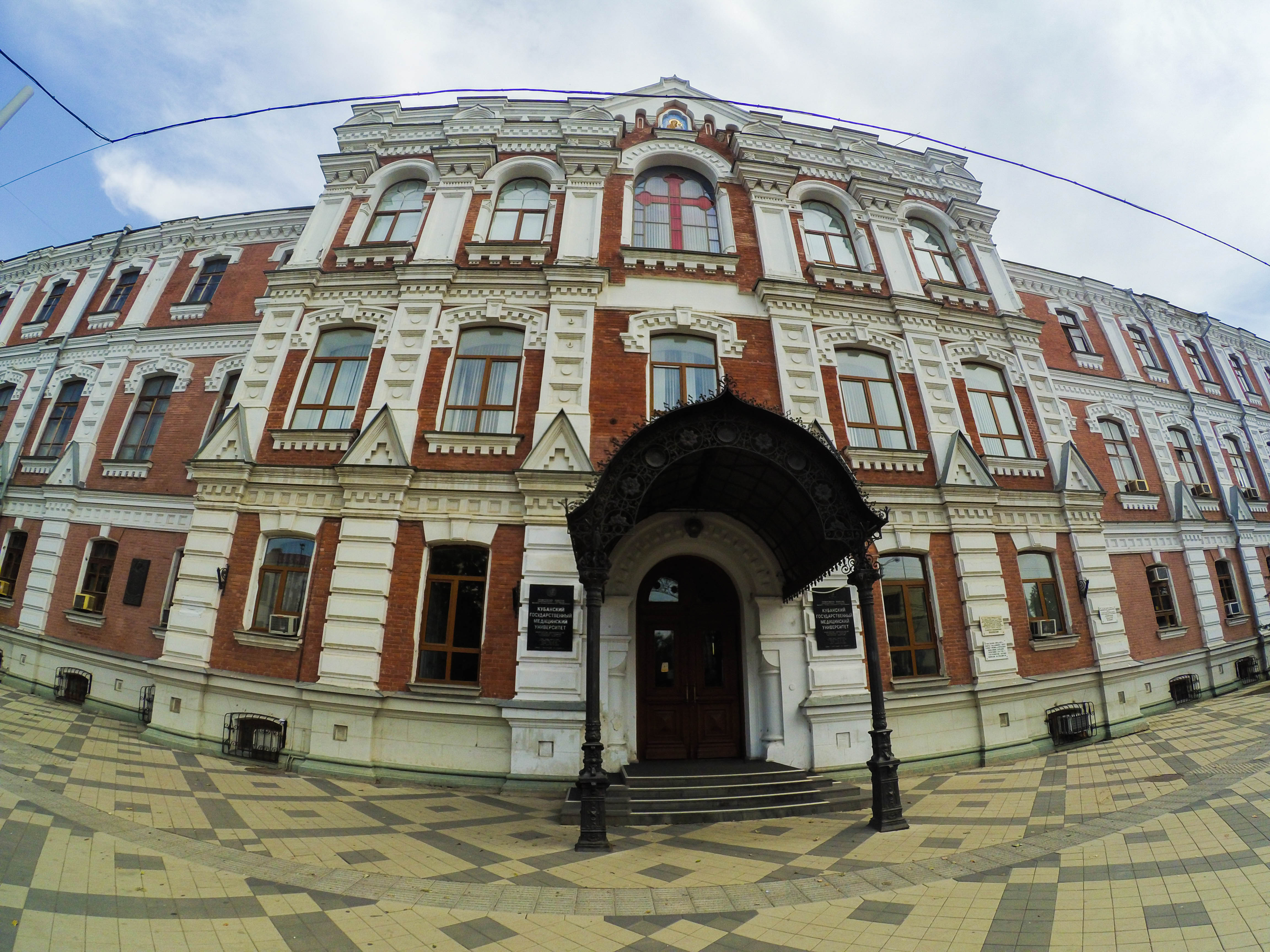

Kuban State Medical University is a medical school in Russia. It is located in Krasnodar, the capital of Krasnodar Krai in South Russia. Kuban State Medical University was founded by the government of the Russian Federation in 1920.

== Ranking and reputation ==
Kuban State Medical University is ranked 6,585 by Webometrics world university ranking and 6,705 by uniRank World University Ranking. Kuban University offers Programs in English for foreign students.

== History ==
On 4 July 1920 the Kuban-Black Sea Revolutionary Committee issued a decree opening in Kuban a state university with three faculties: Medical, Natural Science and Socio-historic. It was opened in place of the prior Diecesan Women's School of Yekaterinodar (currently Krasnodar). In 1921 Kuban State University was reformed. The Medical Faculty became Kuban Medical Institute and the other two faculties were adnexed to the Institute of People's Education, Polytechnic Institute and Pedagogic Institute. Kuban State University was reopened later in 1970 without the medical faculty.

In 1921 “Kubanski nauchni meditsinski vestnik” a regular press scientific organ of South Russia was created by the first rector of Kuban Medical Institute N.F. Melnikov-Razvedenkov. In 1930 the publication of the Journal was interrupted. The publication of the Journal was renewed from 1993.

In 1992 The Faculty of Higher Nurses Education was opened at Kuban Medical Institute which became later in 1997 the Municipal Medical Institute of Higher Nurses Education and went out of the structure of kuban Medical University.

In 1993 a branch of Medical Faculty of Kuban Medical University was opened in Maikop, Capital of the Republic of Adigea in south Russia.

In 1998 Two more faculties were opened at Kuban Medical University: Medico-prophylactic and Pharmacy.

== Notable alumni ==
- Fares Kilzie, entrepreneur
