= Fares Nikhadovich Kilzie =

Russian businessman

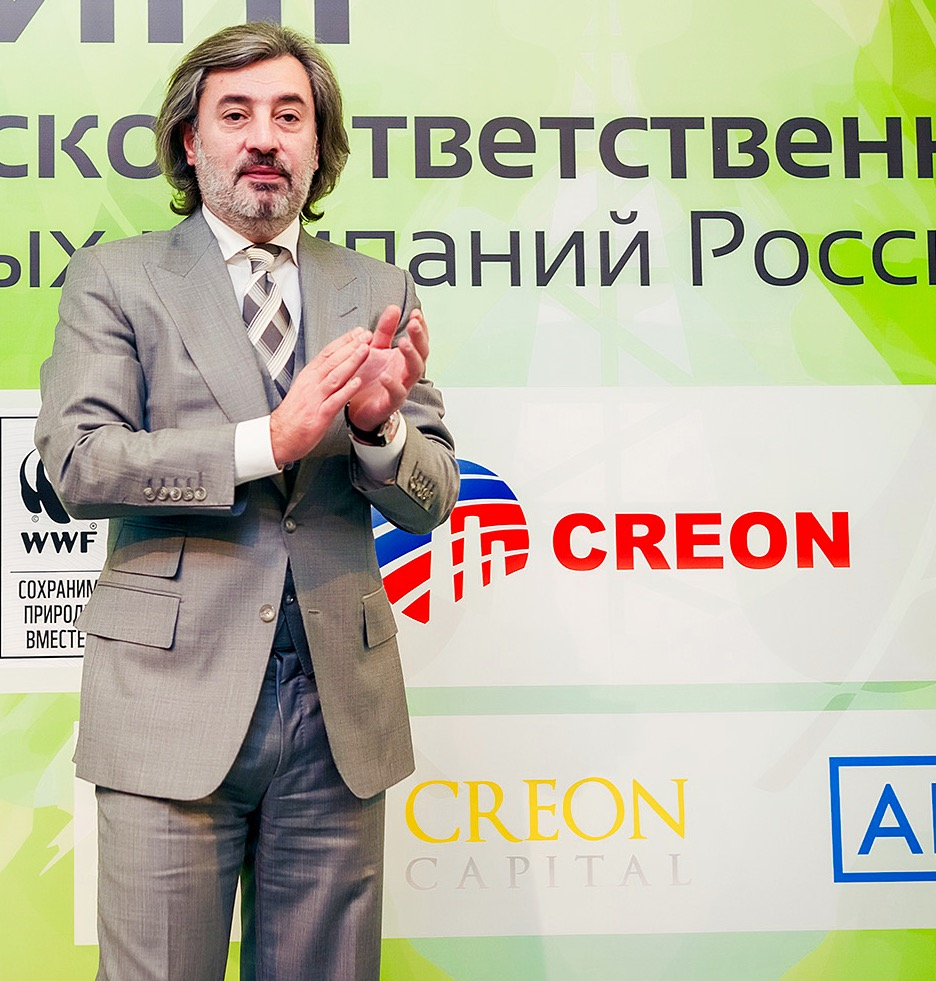
- Born: June 4, 1968 (age 58)
- Education: Kuban medical university
- Employer: CREON Capital
- Title: Chairman

Fares Nikhadovich Kilzie (born June 4, 1968) is a Russian entrepreneur and Chairman of CREON Capital, Chairman the Board of Directors of Creon Energy.

== Biography ==
Kilzie was born on June 4, 1968.

In 1993, he graduated from the Kuban State Medical University, with a specialization «Biochemistry». In October of the same year he became the Department Head at the Moscow Office of ANAS GROUP. In January 1995 he was appointed managing director of the company, whose duties included estimation of competitive environment and competitiveness of manufacture of chemical production at the level of countries, regions of Russia and countries of the Central and Eastern Europe, as well as drawing up of reviews on condition and development prospects of separate chemical companies and enterprises.

In February 1996, Kilzie was appointed managing director of FABA CHEMICALS GmbH, where he was engaged in development and implementation of projects on optimization of direct supplies of raw materials from Russia and CIS countries with arrangement of project financing, insurance of project risks in Russia.

In January 2000, he became the chairman of the Board of Directors of Creon Advisory Company (Moscow). Since May 2012 he has been working as the chairman of the board of directors at Creon Energy.

In 2001, Kilzie established the first independent industry-specific information agency RCC (Russian Chemical Consulting) GmbH, which has become one of the most authoritative corporate information portals in Russia in the area.

In 2002, CREON Group was founded and Kilzie supervised the process of elaboration and estimation of the business plans, worked on technical and economical grounds of investment projects, conducted condition researches and prospects of development of separate oil and gas chemical companies and enterprises, and estimated the commercial potential of new technologies and products (ethylene, propylene, associated petroleum gas, liquefied hydro carbonic gas, liquefied natural gas). In 2012 Kilzie took charge of CREON Energy, which has been the official adviser of the Ministry of Economic Development of the Russian Federation throughout several years, in particular in the classification of questions regarding liquefied hydro carbonic gas, which is considered to be the basis for customs-tariff regulation.

At the same 2012, a unique company entered the market - OJSC INVENTRA, focusing on consultancy services exclusively for polymers industry and the related produced products. And 2017 saw the rise of the company CREON Chemicals specializing in agro chemistry and special chemistry.

In 2016, Kilzie took the lead in the establishment of a direct investment fund, CREON Energy Fund SICAV-SIF, focused on investments in the chemicals sector in the Russian Federation. The estimated overall amount of fund investments exceeds €100mln. The Fund is investing in the projects at their initial stage, in growing and expanding Russian and CIS companies, as well as in eco-projects of 'green' economy and alternative energy. The managing company and the unlimited partner is CREON Capital S.a.r.l. with the head office located in Luxembourg. The partners of CREON Capital are Caceis Bank Luxembourg S.A., Ernst & Young S.A., Arendt & Medernach S.A.

Kilzie speaks fluent Russian, English, German, Arabic and Spanish. He is married and has five children.

== Professional experience ==
As the head of CREON Group, Kilzie took part in management of some projects. Thus, since 2014 CREON Group has acted as the adviser and the operator of the civil-engineering design of methanol manufacturing factory Methanol Serverny which is implemented by NGSK company in Ust-Luga (Leningrad region), and is responsible for full-scale project realization.

Moreover, after several years of cooperation, CREON Group developed a separate Gazprom Eastern Gas Program including a Feasibility Study (FS), offers on production technologies selection and evaluation of licensed extraction facilities. One of the most important factors of this program was an increase in helium production, based on the hypothesis that the development of Chayadinsk and Kovyktinsk extraction facilities might change dramatically the situation on the world gas market. Moreover, the estimation of the Vladivostok LNG was conducted – the liquefied natural gas manufacturing factory (LNG) with the capacity of at least 15 mln tonnes per year.

Within the frames of work on the KazAzot project (unique producer of ammonia and ammonium nitrate in the Republic of Kazakhstan) the efforts of the Group's consultants were focused on execution of a full technical and technological company audit (due diligence). The strategy for the company's further development was also elaborated together with the choice of licenses and company's management schemes. For Sibmethachem company from Tomsk, the Group prepared the site development with due consideration of new tendencies in methanol production. As a result, in 2015, Sibmethachem hit the record production figures for methanol (874 thousand tonnes). At the instructions of GazpromNeft Company, the CREON Group developed a strategy for the development of oil technologies sector with identification of priority directions in development and analysis of existing and projected products portfolio. At the request of one of the largest oil-producing companies in Russia, the CREON Group worked out the justification of the investment project on the basis of market analysis for benzene production facilities across Russia and the CIS countries, with a forecast up to 2035.

Overall working experience amounts to more than 20 years of experience in investments and international petrochemicals consulting industry, including sixteen years of heading the Board of Directors of CREON Group of Companies.

== Public activities ==
=== Rating of oil&gas companies in Russia performed together with WWF ===
In 2014, together with WWF, Kilzie and Creon Energy organized The first Environmental Responsibility Rating of Oil & Gas companies of the Russian Federation, within Rational Approach Project. Rating included 19 leading companies on volumes of oil and natural gas extraction. Rating grade was calculated for each company as average for 28 rating criteria. According to calculations, Surgutneftegaz Company became the winner; Sakhalin Energy comes second place, Gazprom is on the third place.

The principal idea behind this rating is to encourage companies to make good use of hydrocarbon resources, to ensure environmental protection and an ecologically and socially responsible business in Russia. This project was developed in order to provide ‘greening’ of the petrochemicals industry, to include environmental operations into the list of priorities of Oil&Gas Companies and to develop regulatory activities amongst the State authorities of the Russian Federation. Today, this is the only rating in Russia that serves as a tool in evaluation of levels of environmental responsibility of all companies extracting more than 1.5 mln tonnes of oil per year.

When the results of the second Rating (end of 2015) were published, the national petrochemical industry journal Neftegazovaya Vertikal admitted that over just one year, the Rating has been recognised by the companies of this industry, which was particularly reflected in the meeting between representatives of the petrochemicals sector at the premises of CREON Group, which was dedicated to the methodology correction. This meeting was attended by representatives of 11 companies, who put forward more than 70 proposals. The Russian Union of Industrialists and Entrepreneurs (RUIE) included the Rating in its compilation of corporate practice named “Business. Russia. Ecology. People.” The methodology of the research, which has no equivalents, has already attracted interest from abroad, and this helps in reinforcing a positive image of Russia overseas.

The Rating is carried out annually and its publication is considered as a major event in the ecological field of petrochemicals sector in the Russian Federation. It includes such companies as Arktik Gaz, Bashneft, BelkamNeft, Gazprom, Gazprom Neft, Zarubezhneft, Irkutsk Oil Company, LUKOIL, NNK, Novatek, Rosneft, RussNeft, Salym Petroleum Development, Sakhalin Energy, Slavneft, Surgutneftegaz, Tatneft, Tomskneft, Total Razvedka Razrabotka Rossiya, Transneft, and Exxon NL.

All expenditures for elaboration, estimation, corrections and drawing results are financed by Kilzie.

=== Partnership with the RIAC ===
In October 2015, The Russian International Affairs Council (RIAC), in association with the Centre for Strategic Studies (SAM) of the Turkish Ministry of Foreign Affairs, and with the support of CREON Group, held an international conference: “Russia & Turkey – Forging Multidimensional Partnership”. The purpose of the conference was to discuss current aspects of collaboration between Russia and Turkey, mechanisms for implementation of joint infrastructure projects, approaches of the two countries to regional problems.

In May 2016, RIAC also held in cooperation with CREON Group and Russian-Chinese Committee for Friendship and Development, the second international conference: “Russia & China – Towards New Quality of Bilateral Relations”. The event was held with the support of governmental agencies of the Russian Government and the Russian Ministry of Foreign Affairs. The purpose of this conference was to assess the status and development tendencies of Russian-Chinese relations, to identify main achievements and unsettled issues of bilateral cooperation and to prepare proposals for the leaderships of both China and Russia on further development of strategic partnership. The conference became a significant event in the preparation process of Russian President Vladimir Putin's visit to China at the end of June 2016, and received massive coverage in the Russian, Chinese and English-language media.

=== International industry-related events ===
In general, for all working experience of the CREON Group and by Kilzie personally, more than 300 business conferences, congresses and forums have been held, dedicated to the issues of extraction and processing of fossil carbon fuels, processing of polymers, and development of agrochemicals. Some of the events have contributed to development in extracting and recycling branches of the Russian economy.

In 2007 the Group organized the first conference in the country on associated petroleum gas in last decade for subject and complex discussion of problems on effective processing liquefied natural gas (LNG) that subsequently promoted the adoption of law, forcing all oil companies by 2012 to provide 95 percent useful recycling of associated petroleum gas on all of their sites. By the seventh international conference "Associated petroleum gas 2016", a number of leading players of oil branch had already reached recycling level of 95% or have come close to it. However, there were complexities with recycling liquefied natural gas (LNG) on the remote, complex or new sites, and the level of recycling liquefied natural gas (LNG) became one of the key parameters of the rating of ecological safety of the oil and gas companies of the Russian Federation.

2010 witnessed the organization of unique in Russia debatable platform on coverage of helium market, which has no analogues in Europe. As a result, development of manufacture of helium in Russia has justified CREON Group predictions about a high export potential of this product. The director for development and strategy of Gazprom Marketing and Trading France Didier Lebo at the conference "Helium 2016" has informed that with the start of Amur gas recycling factory of Gazprom for the first time one source of manufacture will be enough to cover predicted deficiency in the world market at various scenarios within the next 30 years.

Among other key themes of the actions organised by CREON company and Kilzie manufacture may be highlighted LNG/CNG, LCG, petrol, diesel, mineral fertilizers, caustic soda, sulfur and sulfuric acid, etc.

In March 2012, Creon Company organized «Caustic Soda 2012» Conference. The key issue of the conference was cartel agreement case, initiated by the Federal Antimonopoly Service (FAS) against manufacturers of caustic soda and chloric production headed by United Trade Company (UTK).

=== The Plastics of Russia award ===
In 2014, Creon Energy Group organized the Plastics of Russia National Forum and established the self-titled award aimed at encouragement of Russian companies and enterprises engaged in the formation of the country's plastic industry. First annual Forum was supported by the Ministry of Industry and Trade of the Russian Federation and Analytical Center for the Government of the Russian Federation. According to Kilzie, plastic converting became the national basis and is able to be a key point for development of a significant segment of the Russian industry. Speeches at this forum proved the significant opportunities for development of domestic market of plastics production in all segments of the national economy.

In 2016, the Plastics of Russia Award had eleven categories for polymer products producers and processors. Among the winners of the award were recognised market leaders (including Kazanorgsintez, Ufaorgsintex, SIBUR and Mosoblgaz companies) together with new market players, such as the recently opened polymer film plant in Rostov Region Waterfall Pro.

The award ceremony was covered by leading trade publications and business media, including Expert magazine, the Prime agency for economic news, the PRO-Business television network, and other major organizations.
