= Fuad Fares =

Israeli biologist

- פואד פארס
- Born: 1955 (age 70–71); Hurfeish, Israel
- Education: Hebrew University of Jerusalem

Fuad Fares (Hebrew: פואד פארס) is an Israeli biologist and pharmacologist. Fares is a professor at the University of Haifa, works at the Carmel Hospital and was a partner at the Biomed Prolor company.

== Biography ==
Fuad Fares was born in the village of Hurfish in 1955. He graduated with a bachelor's degree in biology in 1977 from the Hebrew University of Jerusalem and a master's degree in medical sciences in 1983 from the Technion. In 1987 he completed his doctorate in pharmacology at the Technion. He did his postdoctoral fellowship in the Laboratory of Pharmacology and Molecular Biology at the Washington University in St. Louis. He is currently an associate professor in the Department of Human Biology at the University of Haifa.

Fares was one of the founders of the public biotechnology company Prolor and he is one of the directors in the company. Prolor was acquired by OPKO Health in 2013. He is married and has four children.
