= Farés Mehenni =

Algerian footballer (born 2002)

Personal information
- Date of birth: 12 September 2002 (age 24)
- Place of birth: Paris, France
- Position: Defender

Team information
- Current team: Nancy

Youth career
- –2014: FCM Garges
- 2014–2016: AAS Sarcelles
- 2016–2017: Reims
- 2017–2021: Nancy

Senior career*
Years	Team	Apps	(Gls)
2020–	Nancy II	2	(0)
2021–	Nancy	1	(0)

International career^{‡}
2020-	Algeria U20	3	(0)
- * Club domestic league appearances and goals as of 24 July 2021 ‡ National team caps and goals as of 24 July 2021

Farés Mehenni (Arabic: فارس مهني; born 12 September 2002) is an Algerian professional footballer who plays as a defender for Nancy.

== Early life ==
Mehenni was born in Paris, first playing football in Île-de-France at Garges-lès-Gonesse. He later played for AAS Sarcelles and Reims, before joining Nancy in 2017.

== Club career ==
After playing with the first team ahead of the 2021–22 season, Mehenni made his professional debut for Nancy on 24 July 2021, replacing Lamine Cissé in the final minutes of a 2–1 Ligue 2 away defeat to Pau.

== International career ==
Mehenni is of Algerian descent, and was selected for the UNAF qualification tournament for the 2021 Africa U-20 Cup of Nations with the Algeria national under-20 team.
