= Faris Efendić =

Bosnian footballer

Personal information
- Date of birth: 20 February 1983 (age 43)
- Place of birth: Sarajevo, SR Bosnia and Herzegovina, SFR Yugoslavia
- Position: Goalkeeper

Senior career*
Years	Team	Apps	(Gls)
2001–2002	Tasmania Berlin		
2002–2003	Eintracht Trier	0	(0)
2003–2004	Čelik Zenica		
2005–2006	Željezničar Sarajevo		
2006–2007	Igman Konjic		
2008–2009	Velež Mostar	4	(0)
2009–2010	Čelik Zenica	0	(0)
2010–2011	Alta	51	(0)
2012–2013	Goražde	15	(0)
2012–2013	Putnok	11	(0)
2015	Milton SC		
2015	Toronto Croatia		
2017–2019	Croatia AC (indoor)		
2018	CSC Mississauga		
2019	Toronto Croatia		
- * Club domestic league appearances and goals

Faris Efendić (born February 20, 1983) is a Bosnian former footballer who played as a goalkeeper. He also served as an assistant referee.

== Club career ==
=== Early career ===
Efendić played at the regional levels in Germany with TeBe Berlin and SV Tasmania Berlin. In 2002, he signed with Eintracht Trier of the 2. Bundesliga. After failing to break into the senior team he returned to his native country Bosnia to play with Celik Zenica in the Premier League of Bosnia and Herzegovina. The following season, he remained in the top tier by securing a deal with FK Željezničar Sarajevo. He would briefly spend time in the First League of Bosnia and Herzegovina with FK Igman Konjic for the 2006–07 season.

He would ultimately return to the Bosnian top tier the year after where he would remain for the next two seasons originally with Velez Mostar and later with former team Celik Zenica. He departed from the Bosnian football scene after the conclusion of the 2009–10 season.

=== Europe ===
In 2010, he went abroad once again to play in the Norwegian 1. divisjon with Alta IF. He initially went for a trial run and successfully secured a contract. In his debut season with Alta, he appeared in 27 matches. He returned for another season in 2011. In his second season with Alta, he made 25 matches. After two seasons in Norway, he departed from the club. Throughout this tenure with Alta, he was named the club's top goalkeeper of the year.

In early 2012, he returned to the Bosnian second tier to play with FK Goražde. Previously he had an unsuccessful trial run with OFK Gradina. In total, he played in 15 matches for Goražde. Following his stint in Bosnia, he had a trial run with Vardar Skopje. In the winter of 2012, he was transferred to Putnok VSE of the Hungarian Nemzeti Bajnokság II. In his debut season in Hungary, he made 11 appearances.

=== Canada ===
In the summer of 2015, he played in the Canadian Soccer League with Milton SC. Midway through the season, he was traded to Toronto Croatia. He helped Toronto secure a playoff berth by finishing second in the First Division. In the opening round of the postseason, the Croats defeated his former club, Milton. Toronto would advance to the championship final after defeating York Region Shooters in the semi-finals. He would participate in the CSL Championship final where Toronto defeated SC Waterloo Region for the title.

He played at the indoor level in the winter of 2017–18 in the Mississauga-centered Arena Premier League with Croatia AC. In their debut season, the Croats managed to win the championship title. He returned for an additional season with Croatia for the 2018-19 indoor season.

In 2018, he returned to the CSL to play with CSC Mississauga.

Efendić made a brief return to Toronto Croatia for the 2019 Croatian World Club Championship and was featured in the tournament final against SC Croat San Pedro but lost the series.

== Referee career ==
Efendić was the assistant referee in the CSL Championship final between Scarborough SC and FC Ukraine United in 2019. In 2021, he once more officiated a championship match as an assistant between Scarborough and FC Vorkuta.

== Honours ==
Toronto Croatia

- CSL Championship: 2015
