= Emmy McClelland =

American politician

Emmy McClelland is a former American Republican politician from Webster Groves, Missouri who served in the Missouri House of Representatives.

Born in Springfield, Missouri, she graduated from University of Missouri with a bachelor's degree in political science. Her husband was Alan McClelland, a US Navy veteran who died in 2021.
