= Jawad Fares =

Lebanese physician-scientist

- Born: Jawad Youssef Fares; 1991 (age 34–35); Madrid
- Education: American University of Beirut (BS, MD), Harvard Medical School (PGCert), Northwestern University (Postdoc)
- Awards: King Hussein Award for Cancer Research (2022)
- Scientific career
- Fields: Neurosurgery, neuro-oncology, translational research
- Workplaces: Northwestern University; University of Cambridge

Jawad Youssef Fares (Arabic: جواد يوسف فارس; born 1991 in Madrid, Spain) is a Lebanese physician-scientist in neurosurgery at the Feinberg School of Medicine of Northwestern University. He is known for his work in translational neuro-oncology, particularly in developing therapeutic and molecular approaches for brain tumors.

== Early life ==
Fares was born in 1991 in Madrid, Spain, and raised in Beirut, Lebanon. He completed a Bachelor of Science in Biology and a Doctor of Medicine (M.D.) at the American University of Beirut, and a Master of Science in Neuropsychology from the Lebanese University. In 2018, Fares relocated to the United States, where he pursued a postgraduate program in Cancer Biology and Therapeutics at Harvard Medical School. He subsequently completed a postdoctoral research fellowship in brain tumor biology and gene therapy at Northwestern University in the laboratory of Maciej Lesniak, before continuing his neurosurgery training at Northwestern Memorial Hospital.

== Research ==
Fares’s research primarily focuses on neuro-oncology, molecular biology, and translational medicine, following earlier contributions to the study of injury and health outcomes in conflict settings.

=== Neuro-oncology and translational therapeutics ===
Fares’s research in neuro-oncology bridges molecular discovery with translational and clinical investigation to advance therapies for gliomas and brain metastasis. He has been part of multidisciplinary efforts to redefine brain metastasis as a primary disease of the central nervous system, emphasizing the molecular divergence of intracranial metastases from their systemic counterparts and the therapeutic implications of that distinction. His work, published in The Lancet Oncology, proposed a new conceptual framework for studying and treating brain metastases as distinct entities within oncology.

At Northwestern University, Fares has contributed to the first-in-human gene therapy trial using neural-stem-cell–based delivery of an oncolytic adenovirus for malignant glioma, a milestone study demonstrating the safety and biological activity of targeted viral therapy within the human brain. His translational work also encompasses biomarker-guided drug repurposing and small-molecule therapeutics, including studies identifying metixene as a potential treatment for metastatic cancers such as breast, lung, and melanoma, as well as their brain metastases, through modulation of the NDRG1 pathway and induction of incomplete autophagy.

=== Conflict medicine and injury research ===
Earlier in his career, Fares studied the medical and psychological consequences of armed conflict, focusing on civilian injuries caused by cluster munitions in Lebanon. He analyzed trauma patterns, amputations, and long-term functional outcomes among survivors, and developed the Fares Scale of Injuries due to Cluster Munitions to classify injury severity and distribution. His work provided one of the first comprehensive assessments of the public health impact of cluster munitions and helped advance the study of health outcomes in populations affected by war.

== Honors ==
- 2026 – Society for Neuro-Oncology Neurosurgery Award
- 2026 – Young Global Leader of the World Economic Forum
- 2026 – NREF & Academy of Neurological Surgeons Research Fellowship
- 2026 – Finalist in Oncology, Takeda Innovators in Science Award with Nature
- 2025 – Fellow of the Royal Society of Biology (FRSB)
- 2025 – Emerging Generation Award, American Society for Clinical Investigation (ASCI)
- 2024 – Asia 21 Next Generation Fellow, Asia Society
- 2022 – Member of the Lebanese Academy
- 2022 – King Hussein Award for Cancer Research
- 2022 – Ronald L. Bittner Award on Brain Tumor Research, American Association of Neurological Surgeons (AANS)
- 2021 – InterAcademy Partnership (IAP) Young Physician Leader
- 2018 – GEN Top 10 Under 40 in Biomedicine, Genetic Engineering News
- 2018 – Arab Youth Pioneer, World Government Summit
- 2018 – Forbes 30 Under 30 in Science and Healthcare

== Selected publications ==
- Fares, J.; Fares, M. Y.; Khachfe, H. H.; Salhab, H. A.; Fares, Y. (March 12, 2020). "Molecular principles of metastasis: a hallmark of cancer revisited". Signal Transduction and Targeted Therapy. 5 (1). Springer Nature. doi:10.1038/s41392-020-0134-x. PMC 7067809. PMID 32296047.
- Fares, J.; Ahmed, A. U.; Ulasov, I. V.; Sonabend, A. M.; Miska, J.; Lee-Chang, C.; Balyasnikova, I. V.; Chandler, J. P.; Portnow, J.; Tate, M. C.; Kumthekar, P.; Lukas, R. V.; Grimm, S. A.; Adams, A. K.; Hébert, C. D.; Strong, T. V.; Amidei, C.; Arrieta, V. A.; Zannikou, M.; Horbinski, C.; Zhang, H.; Burdett, K. B.; Curiel, D. T.; Sachdev, S.; Aboody, K. S.; Stupp, R.; Lesniak, M. S. (August 2021). "Neural stem cell delivery of an oncolytic adenovirus in newly diagnosed malignant glioma: a first-in-human, phase 1, dose-escalation trial". The Lancet Oncology. 22 (8). Elsevier: 1103–1114. doi:10.1016/S1470-2045(21)00245-X. PMC 8328944. PMID 34214495.
- Fares, J.; Petrosyan, E.; Dmello, C.; Lukas, R. V.; Stupp, R.; Lesniak, M. S. (February 2025). "Rethinking metastatic brain cancer as a CNS disease". The Lancet Oncology. 26 (2). Elsevier: e111–e121. doi:10.1016/S1470-2045(24)00430-3. PMID 39914421.
- Fares, J.; Petrosyan, E.; Kanojia, D.; Dmello, C.; Cordero, A.; Duffy, J. T.; Yeeravalli, R.; Sahani, M. H.; Zhang, P.; Rashidi, A.; Arrieta, V. A.; Ulasov, I.; Ahmed, A. U.; Miska, J.; Balyasnikova, I. V.; James, C. D.; Sonabend, A. M.; Heimberger, A. B.; Lesniak, M. S. (December 15, 2023). "Metixene is an incomplete autophagy inducer in preclinical models of metastatic cancer and brain metastases". Journal of Clinical Investigation. 133 (24). American Society for Clinical Investigation. doi:10.1172/JCI161142. PMC 10721147. PMID 37847564.
