= Fares Sayegh =

Greek orthopaedic surgeon and researcher

Fares E. Sayegh
- Education: Aristotle University of Thessaloniki
- Scientific career
- Institutions: G. Papanikolaou General Hospital; Aristotle University of Thessaloniki

Fares E. Sayegh is a Greek orthopaedic surgeon at the G. Papanikolaou General Hospital and a professor at Aristotle University of Thessaloniki, both in Thessaloniki, Greece. He has an h-index of 18

His most-cited articles are:

- Sayegh, Fares E.; Kenanidis, Eustathios I.; Papavasiliou, Kyriakos A.; Potoupnis, Michael E.; Kirkos, John M.; Kapetanos, George A. (2009-06-15). "Efficacy of steroid and nonsteroid caudal epidural injections for low back pain and sciatica: a prospective, randomized, double-blind clinical trial". Spine. 34 (14): 1441–1447. doi:10.1097/BRS.0b013e3181a4804a. ISSN 1528-1159. PMID 19525834. S2CID 205511689.
- Sayegh, Fares E.; Kenanidis, Eustathios I.; Papavasiliou, Kyriakos A.; Potoupnis, Michael E.; Kirkos, John M.; Kapetanos, George A. (December 2009). "Reduction of acute anterior dislocations: a prospective randomized study comparing a new technique with the Hippocratic and Kocher methods". The Journal of Bone and Joint Surgery. American Volume. 91 (12): 2775–2782. doi:10.2106/JBJS.H.01434. ISSN 1535-1386. PMID 19952238.

== Education ==
Sayegh has M.D. and Ph.D. degrees from Aristotle University of Thessaloniki.
