= Fares Al Hatrash =

Saudi footballer

Personal information
- Full name: Fares Ali Al Hatrash Al-Yami
- Date of birth: February 20, 1991 (age 35)
- Place of birth: Saudi Arabia
- Height: 1.78 m (5 ft 10 in)
- Position: Midfielder

Youth career
- Al-Hilal

Senior career*
Years	Team	Apps	(Gls)
2012–2013	Najran	1	(0)
2013–2014	Al Akhdoud		
2014–2015	Abha		
2015–2016	Damac		
2016–2017	Al-Thoqbah		
2017–2018	Al-Qous		
- * Club domestic league appearances and goals

Fares Al Hatrash (born 20 February 1991) is a Saudi football player.
