= Peter Faris =

Australian lawyer

George Peter Faris (born c. 1942), KC is a retired criminal lawyer, former chief of the NCA, and former conservative media commentator and radio broadcaster in Melbourne, Australia.

== Early career ==
He commenced practice as a solicitor in 1963 under the tutelage of the Australian defence lawyer Frank Galbally.

== Legal career ==
Faris signed the roll of counsel of the Victorian Bar in 1970 and practiced as defence and prosecuting counsel in serious criminal cases. In the mid-1980s he "took silk" and became a King's Counsel, participating in criminal trials.

From 1989 to 1990 he was chairman of Australia's peak crime-fighting taskforce, the troubled National Crime Authority (now the Australian Crime Commission).

After leaving the NCA Faris returned to private practice as a barrister.

== Media career ==
Faris' hard-line conservative views found an audience at Melbourne's 3AW radio station in 2006, and he promoted a self-published blog. The blog was entitled "Faris, QC" and subheaded "Australia, Love It or Leave It".

He has promoted racial profiling, and campaigned against Wesley Central Mission's attempt to establish a health and rehabilitation centre for heroin addicts. He also received mention on the "Dishonour Board" of the Ernie Awards for insulting comments about women. His advocacy of torture as an acceptable interrogation tactic became infamous and was widely condemned.

In 2007 Faris asserted in the media that cocaine use was rife among Melbourne's legal profession, prompting an investigation of him by the Victorian Bar's ethics committee. In response, Faris announced that he would resign his Victorian Bar membership to practice as independent counsel.

On 25 January 2009, Faris announced that he would discontinue blogging:

Goodbye to all. I am closing this blog as I wish to concentrate my writing efforts elsewhere. Thank you all for your support over the years.

The blog has since been dismantled.
