= Kable v Director of Public Prosecutions (NSW) =

Judgement of the High Court of Australia

Kable v DPP (NSW)
- Court: High Court of Australia
- Full case name: Kable v The Director of Public Prosecutions for New South Wales
- Decided: 12 September 1996
- Citations: [1996] HCA 24, (1996) 189 CLR 51
- Transcripts: 18 Aug [1995] HCATrans 260 Special leave; 7 Dec [1995] HCATrans 430; 8 Dec [1995] HCATrans 433

Case history
- Prior action: Kable v Director of Public Prosecutions (1995) 36 NSWLR 374
- Subsequent actions: NSW v Kable [2013] HCA 26, (2013) 252 CLR 118

Court membership
- Judges sitting: Brennan CJ, Dawson, Toohey, Gaudron, McHugh and Gummow JJ

Case opinions
- (4:2) The Community Protection Act 1994 was an invalid law because it vested the Supreme Court of New South Wales with powers incompatible with its role in the federal judicial structure (per Toohey, Gaudron, McHugh and Gummow JJ; Dawson J & Brennan CJ dissenting)

Kable v DPP is a decision of the High Court of Australia. It is a significant case in Australian constitutional law.

The case is notable for having established the 'Kable Doctrine', also known as the Kable principle, a precept in Australian law with relevance to numerous important legal issues; including the separation of powers, parliamentary sovereignty, Australian federalism, and the judicial role. It is particularly significant as one of the few restraints upon the otherwise plenary legislative powers of state parliaments in Australia, aside from those imposed by the Commonwealth through section 109. (Note: Other restraints on state parliament legislative powers also exist in the Commonwealth constitution. E.g. those implied by s50, s92, etc.)

The Kable decision is controversial among legal scholars.

== Facts ==
Gregory Kable had been sentenced to five years imprisonment for the manslaughter of his wife. In jail, Kable had sent threatening letters to the people who denied him access to his children. He was charged and sentenced to an additional 16 months for writing the letters in 1990. Four years later, having been granted no parole, he was released from jail.

His release coincided with a state election campaign which featured "law and order" as a major issue. In the course of that campaign, the Parliament of New South Wales passed the Community Protection Act 1994. It authorised the Supreme Court of New South Wales to make an order requiring that a single individual be detained in prison if the Court was satisfied that that person posed a significant danger to the public.

The Act was later amended to authorise the Court to detain Kable specifically. (Note: In effect, Kable was subject to a bill of attainder.) The legislation was closely modeled on a law passed in Victoria, the Community Protection Act 1990, which was enacted to authorise 'preventive detention' for Garry David.

In early 1995, Justice Levine of the Supreme Court made an order under the Community Protection Act requiring that Kable be detained for a period of six months. Kable appealed that decision but lost at the NSW Court of Appeal.

Kable then appealed to the High Court. His counsel, Sir Maurice Byers, put forward an argument that the legislation was constitutionally invalid.

== Judgment ==
The High Court held that the law was unconstitutional. Its reasoning was that the act had conferred a power upon the NSW Supreme Court which was incompatible with section 71 of the constitution. Section 71 vests Australia's state supreme courts with federal judicial power.

The act was described by multiple justices in the majority as requiring the Supreme Court to (perform) non-judicial functions of such a nature that public confidence in the integrity of the judiciary as an institution ... is diminished'. This was an attempt to ground Kable in the precedent of a test for invalidity set by Grollo v Palmer. (Note: Grollo v Palmer is an Australian separation of powers case regarding the persona designata doctrine.) The preventative detention of Kable under the act for reasons of anticipated criminality was enough for Toohey J to declare that the Grollo test had been met.

== Aftermath ==
After the decision, Kable sought an award of damages for abuse of process, false imprisonment and malicious prosecution. His application was dismissed by the Supreme Court of NSW, but he was successful in an appeal to the NSW Court of Appeal on his claim of false imprisonment with damages to be assessed. The State of NSW then appealed to the High Court.

The High Court unanimously upheld the appeal and dismissed Mr Kable's claims, holding that a detention order made by a judge of the Supreme Court of NSW was valid until it was set aside and provided lawful authority for Mr Kable's detention.

== Significance ==
The Kable decision is controversial among legal scholars. The decision has received qualified praise from TRS Allan who said that; 'despite doubtful reasoning, (it) vindicated indirectly the fundamental character of the separation of powers as an aspect of the rule of law'. Prominent critics of the decision include Jeffrey Goldsworthy and George Winterton. Winterton described the reasoning in Kable as 'barely even plausible'; while Goldsworthy described the decision and its line of authority as lacking 'methodological rigour'; accusing the court of 'judicial statesmanship'.

The principles and reasoning supporting the Kable doctrine are understood to have developed since the original decision. One such important case in this line of authority is Kirk v Industrial Relations Commission.

Kable has proven to be an important doctrine for the court to consider in many subsequent decisions; including an appeal by Julian Knight for his release in Knight v Victoria.

== See also ==
- Australian constitutional law
