= Youssef Fares (neurosurgeon) =

Lebanese neurosurgeon and academic

- Born: Lebanon
- Education: University of Granada (MD), Autonomous University of Madrid (PhD), American University of Technology (EMBA)
- Known for: Neurosurgery, Healthcare leadership, Fares Scale of Injuries due to Cluster Munitions
- Awards: Elected Member, European Academy of Sciences and Arts (2020); TWAS Arab Regional Award (2021)
- Scientific career
- Fields: Neurosurgery; Research; Education; Healthcare
- Workplaces: Lebanese University; Al-Zahraa Hospital University Medical Center
- Thesis: Técnicas de infusión intratecal de baclofen en el tratamiento de la espasticidad (Techniques for the intrathecal infusion of baclofen for the treatment of spasticity) (1992)
- Doctoral advisor: Juan Burzaco Santurtun
- Website: zhumc.org.lb/ceochairman/

Youssef Fares (Arabic: يوسف فارس) is a Lebanese neurosurgeon, academic and healthcare leader. He is Professor of Neurosurgery at the Lebanese University, Founding President of the Lebanese Academy, and Chief Executive Officer and Chairman of Al-Zahraa Hospital University Medical Center. He previously served as Dean of the Lebanese University Faculty of Medicine and Founding Director of its Neuroscience Research Center.

Fares is the Founding President of the Lebanese Association of Spine Surgery and has held leadership roles within the World Academy of Medical Sciences. He serves on the editorial boards of Surgical Neurology International and the International Journal of Neuroscience.

In 2020, he was elected to the European Academy of Sciences and Arts, where he serves as Lebanon’s delegate.

== Early life and education ==
Fares was born and raised in Lebanon. In 1982, he moved to Spain to pursue medical training. He received his MD from the University of Granada in 1987 and a PhD in Medicine and Surgery summa cum laude from the Autonomous University of Madrid in 1992. His doctoral work focused on intrathecal baclofen infusion techniques for the treatment of spasticity.

He completed his neurosurgical residency at the Hospital Universitario Fundación Jiménez Díaz of the Autonomous University of Madrid and obtained board certification from the Spanish Ministry of Education and Science in 1993. He subsequently undertook fellowships in stereotactic neurosurgery at the Hospital Infanta Cristina de Badajoz, pediatric neurosurgery at the Hôpital de la Timone, epilepsy surgery at the Maudsley Hospital and neuronavigation at the Pitié-Salpêtrière Hospital.

Fares later completed an Executive MBA in Healthcare Management with honors from the American University of Technology.

== Career ==
Since 1994, Fares has been a faculty member at the Lebanese University, where he holds the rank of professor. He served as Chairman of the Department of Neurosurgery from 2009 to 2020, Associate Dean of the Faculty of Medicine from 2011 to 2020, and Dean from 2020 to 2022.

In 2014, he founded the Neuroscience Research Center at the Lebanese University and served as its Founding Director until 2022. During his deanship, he established additional research programs and graduate training pathways in clinical investigation, health administration, and medical ethics.

In 2016, Fares was appointed CEO and Chairman of Al-Zahraa Hospital University Medical Center. He oversaw its integration as a teaching and research hospital affiliated with the Lebanese University Faculty of Medicine and directed institutional responses during the COVID-19 pandemic.

In 1998, he founded the Lebanese Association of Spine Surgery, a national professional society focused on spine care standards and education.

In 2021, Fares led the creation of the Lebanese Academy by national decree and formally launched it in 2022 as Lebanon’s national learned society. As its Founding President, he established its governance structure and merit-based election processes.

== Research ==
Fares has authored more than 140 peer-reviewed publications across neurosurgery, neuroscience, and conflict medicine. He co-developed the Fares Scale of Injuries due to Cluster Munitions to evaluate functional impairment in victims of cluster munitions.

== Honors ==
- 2022: Founding member of the Lebanese Academy
- 2021: International Fellow of the American Association of Neurological Surgeons
- 2021: TWAS Arab Regional Award, The World Academy of Sciences
- 2020: Elected member of the European Academy of Sciences and Arts
- 2018: Distinguished Pioneer Award, Lebanese University
- 2017: Fellow of the World Academy of Medical Sciences
- 2017: Fellow of the International College of Surgeons
- 2017: Fellow of the American College of Surgeons
