= Canada Shipping Act =

Act of the Parliament of Canada

Canada Shipping Act, 2001

Parliament of Canada
- Long title: An Act respecting shipping and navigation and to amend the Shipping Conferences Exemption Act, 1987 and other Acts
- Citation: S.C. 2001, c. 26
- Considered by: House of Commons of Canada
- Enacted by: Parliament of Canada
- Considered by: Senate of Canada

Legislative history

Initiating chamber: Parliament of Canada
- Bill citation: Bill C-14
- Introduced by: David Collenette, Minister of Transport
- First reading: March 1, 2001
- Second reading: March 16, 2001
- Third reading: May 10, 2001

Revising chamber: Senate of Canada
- First reading: May 15, 2001
- Second reading: May 30, 2001
- Third reading: October 31, 2001
- Status: In force

The Canada Shipping Act, 2001 (French: Loi de 2001 sur la marine marchande du Canada) is legislation enacted by the Parliament of Canada, governing the powers of government to regulate the registration and operation of ships and pleasure craft, including personnel and navigation. The Act also establishes the legal regime that governs naval accidents in Canada's waters, as well as marine pollution of any seafaring vessels. The Act was amended in 2023, and sees regular amendment.

== Legislative history ==
At Confederation, the federal government was generally understood by both the British and Canadian governments as not having direct authority over shipping matters, instead deferring to the United Kingdom's Imperial Shipping Act. The historical background of the act can be traced to pre-Confederation to 1845, where the government of the Province of Canada first exercised authority over requiring registration for ships navigating inland waters, until it was superseded by the British Merchant Shipping Act 1854 (17 & 18 Vict. c. 104).

In 1878, the Canadian government passed legislation attempting to repeal the applicability of Section 23 of the British Merchant Shipping Act 1876 (39 & 40 Vict. c. 80), which was not assented to due to British government opposition.

Canadian legislation in 1870 extended restrictions on coasting trade, from one Canadian port to another.

In 1910 the Marquess of Crewe pointed out significant divergence of the Canadian shipping industry from adherence to imperial law.

In the 1920s, the imperial shipping regime decentralized, and after the Balfour Declaration in 1926, and the ensuing Statute of Westminster, Canada was no longer formally subservient to British legislation. Even prior to the Statute, Canada pursued a new legislative agenda regarding shipping, at a 1929 subconference of the Imperial Conference. This led to the creation of the British Commonwealth Merchant Shipping Agreement, a treaty between British dominions.

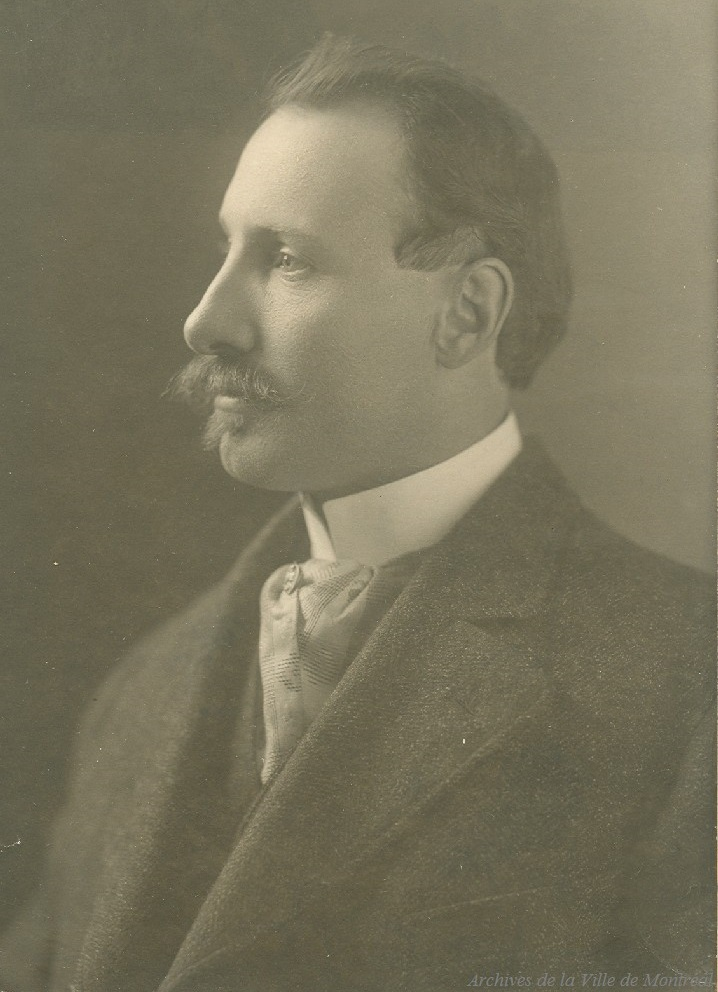
Alfred Duranleau, who first introduced a comprehensive domestic shipping act.

This led to the creation of the domestic Canada Shipping Act, introduced by Alfred Duranleau and first passed in 1934. The legislation generally reproduced domestically the British Merchant Shipping Act 1894 (57 & 58 Vict. c. 60), but with updates. The act came into force in 1936.

The act saw major changes in 1948 in areas relating to certification of ship's officers, steamship inspection, and shipping of seamen, as well as conforming with International Labour Organization (ILO) conventions on the certification of seamen. In 1950, domestic registration was strengthened and the International Convention on the Safety of Life at Sea were implemented. In 1956, the Act was first amended to incorporate environmental law in marine ecosystems, which were later extended, most substantially in the 1970s. In 1963, the provisions of the Act that normally only affected sea-going vessels were extended to Great Lakes shipping.

In 1985, after a task force looking into deep-sea shipping, the shipping act was rewritten into the Shipping Act of 1985, which was then further redrafted in 2001 into the Canada Shipping Act, 2001.

== Statutory details and powers ==
The Act establishes general goals of protecting vessels and crews, promoting safety, protecting marine environments, promoting shipping, establishing an inspection regime, and meeting international obligations. Throughout the Act, the legislation establishes the ability of Ministers to create regulations in relation to the areas legislated under the statute as well as creating criminal and quasi-criminal civil penalties for violations.

The act establishes broad powers to be exercised by the Minister of Transport or the Minister of Fisheries and Oceans. Included in the powers are the power to develop regulations and standards, as well as the power specifically of the Minister of Transport to provide exemptions to responsibilities under the Act if the minister judges that the deviation will enhance safety or environmental protection. For example, in 2024, the Minister restricted heavy fuel from being carried in transit through Canada's arctic waters.

The Minister of Transport is authorized to designate inspectors, and require ships to undertake inspections of ship and cargo, and obligate shipping companies to maintain documents.

The Act establishes the regime for registration of ships, ship naming, requirements for maintaining records, and for displaying ships markings.

The Act establishes a regime for ship's crews, establishing authority of ship's masters over management and discipline of ship's crews, as well as giving ship's crews authority over passengers. The Act furthermore gives authority of the ship's master over stowaways equivalent to that of crew. The Act also creates an obligation for physicians or optometrists to report to the Minister of Transport any person whose health condition would constitute a danger to marine safety. The Act empowers the ship's master over hiring conditions and discharge, as well as maintaining records of service, and creates an obligation to report any births or deaths that occur on the ship.

The Act also bans those who construct ships from deviating from design drawings for a ship.

The Act establishes the power of the Minister to prevent movement of a ship from a restricted navigational zone, to appoint traffic service providers and require communications equipment. The Act also creates an obligation for vessels to answer distress signals and assist with search-and-rescue missions as directed, as well as assist in lifesaving activities in the case it is involved in a collision. In incidents leading to a death, the Act authorizes the Minister of Transport to commission inquiries into causes of death occurring on a ship.

The Act establishes the responsibilities and powers of the Ministers to prevent marine pollution. The Minister of Transport is authorized to direct the activities of a ship reasonably expected to discharge a pollutant or that has discharged a pollutant. The Minister is further empowered to regulate oil handling facilities. The Minister of Fisheries and Oceans is empowered to appoint pollution response officers, with the authority to board ships, sample cargo, to direct the route and speed of ships if it is in the interest of prevention of release of pollutants.

The Minister is obligated to detain unsafe vessels, and may furthermore exclude or expel ships from Canadian waters if they are believed to be in contravention of international conventions to which Canada has agreed. The Minister is also empowered to designate foreign territories as areas of war or conflict, and designate types of goods that cannot be shipped to that jurisdiction or shipped if they are eventually bound to that destination.

== Regulation ==
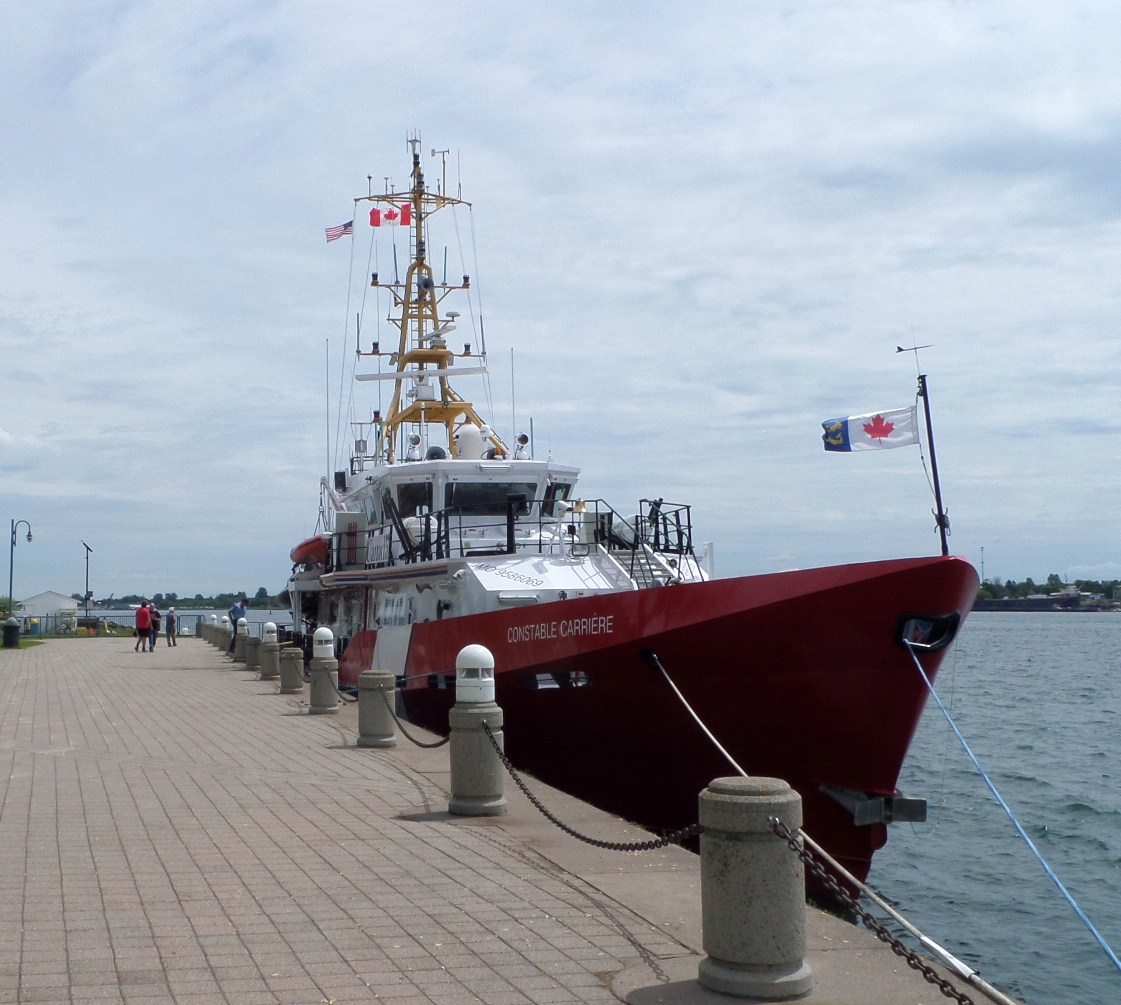
The Canadian Coast Guard, one of multiple agencies empowered to enforce the Act

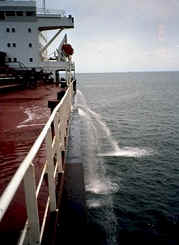
Pumping of ballast water, a vector for environmental contamination, and regulated under the Act.

The Act has multiple regulations that have been enacted by the Governor-in-Council, expanding on multiple authorities given to the ministers under the Act, including filling minor elements of shipping that are not singled out in the act, such as elevator safety on ships. Other examples of regulations include regulations regarding ballast water dumping, fire safety, small vessel regulations, vessel registration fees and Arctic shipping.

Other regulations have been repealed, such as regulations regarding anchorage, hull inspection, or navigation of minor waterways such as the St. Clair River or Burlington Canal. Many regulations that have been deprecated are repealed with their contents instead being updated or consolidated into new regulations, some with identical names.

== Notable prosecutions ==
=== Linda O'Leary prosecution ===
In 2019, following a fatal boat crash, Linda O'Leary, wife of Canadian entrepreneur and political aspirant Kevin O'Leary, was charged under the Act, garnering national media attention. In 2021, O'Leary was acquitted.

=== MV Marathassa prosecution ===
In 2015, the MV Marathassa, a grain carrier, spilled thousands of litres of fuel into Vancouver's English Bay. The Public Prosecution Service of Canada charged the shipping line, Alassia Newships Management Inc., including with six charges under the Canada Shipping Act, posting a fine of up to $6 million collectively. In 2019, the company was acquitted on all charges, on the basis that the prosecution had insufficiently established that the company failed to perform due diligence.
