= Juvenile delinquency =

Illegal behavior by minors

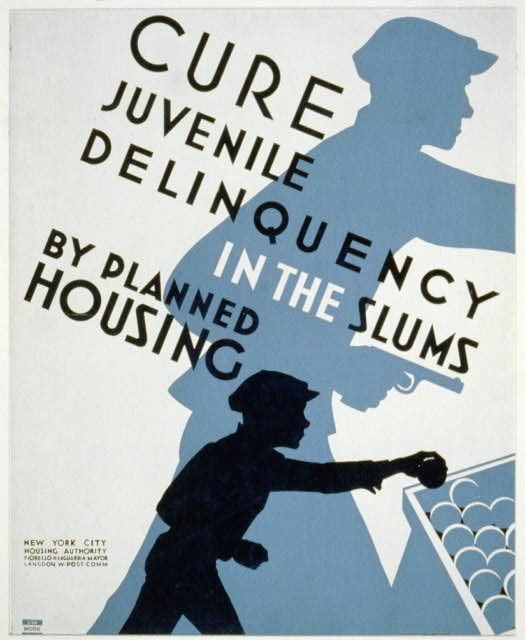
1936 poster promoting planned housing as a method to deter juvenile delinquency, showing silhouettes of a child stealing a piece of fruit and an older child involved in armed robbery

Juvenile delinquency, also known as juvenile offending, is the act of participating in unlawful behavior younger than the statutory age of majority. These acts would be considered crimes if the individuals committing them were older. The term delinquent usually refers to juvenile delinquency, and is also generalised to refer to a young person who behaves an unacceptable way.

Some scholars have found an increase in youth arrests and have concluded that this may reflect more aggressive criminal justice and zero-tolerance policies rather than changes in youth behavior. Youth violence rates in the United States have dropped to approximately 12% of peak rates in 1993, according to official U.S. government statistics, suggesting that most juvenile offending is non-violent. Many delinquent acts can be attributed to the environmental factors such as family behavior or peer influence.

One contributing factor that has gained attention in recent years is the school-to-prison pipeline. According to Diverse Education, nearly 75% of states have built more jails and prisons than colleges. CNN also provides a diagram that shows that the cost per inmate is significantly higher in most states than the cost per student. This shows that taxpayers' dollars are going toward providing for prisoners rather than providing for the educational system and promoting the advancement of education. For every school built, the focus on punitive punishment has correlated with juvenile delinquency rates. Some have suggested shifting from zero-tolerance policies to restorative justice approaches.

Juvenile detention centers, juvenile courts, and electronic monitoring are common structures of the juvenile legal system. Juvenile courts are in place to address offenses as civil rather than criminal cases in most instances. The frequency of use and structure of these courts in the United States varies by state. Depending on the type and severity of the offense committed, individuals under 18 may be charged and treated as adults.

== Overview ==
Juvenile delinquency, or offending, is often separated into three categories:

- delinquency, crimes committed by minors younger than the statutory age of majority, which are dealt with by the juvenile courts and justice system;
- criminal behavior, crimes dealt with by the criminal justice system;
- status offenses, offenses that are only classified as such because only a minor can commit them. One example of this is possession of alcohol by a minor. These offenses are also dealt with by the juvenile courts.

Currently, there is not an agency whose jurisdiction is tracking worldwide juvenile delinquency, but UNICEF estimates that over one million children are in some detention globally. Many countries do not keep records of the amount of delinquent or detained juveniles, but of the ones that do, the United States has the highest number of juvenile delinquency cases. In the United States, the Office of Juvenile Justice and Delinquency Prevention compiles data concerning trends in juvenile delinquency. According to their most recent publication, 7 in 1,000 juveniles in the U.S. committed a serious crime in 2016. The U.S. Department of Justice defines a serious crime as one of the following eight offenses: murder and non-negligent homicide, rape (legacy & revised), robbery, aggravated assault, burglary, motor vehicle theft, larceny theft, and arson. According to research compiled by James Howell in 2009, the juvenile arrest rate has been dropping consistently since its peak in 1994. Of the cases for juvenile delinquency that make it through the court system, probation is the most common consequence, and males account for over 70% of the caseloads.

According to developmental research by Moffitt (2006), two types of offenders emerge in adolescence. The first is an age-specific offender, referred to as the adolescence-limited offender, for whom juvenile offending or delinquency begins and ends during their period of adolescence. Moffitt argues that most teenagers tend to show some form of antisocial or delinquent behavior during adolescence; it is therefore essential to account for these behaviors in childhood to determine whether they will be adolescence-limited offenders or something more long-term. The other type of offender is the repeat offender, referred to as the life-course-persistent offender, who begins offending or showing antisocial/aggressive behavior in adolescence (or even in childhood) and continues into adulthood.

== Situational factors ==
Most of the influencing factors for juvenile delinquency tend to be caused by a mix of both genetic and environmental factors. According to Laurence Steinberg's book Adolescence, the two most significant predictors of juvenile delinquency are parenting style and peer group association. Additional factors that may lead a teenager into juvenile delinquency include poor or low socioeconomic status, poor school readiness/performance, and/or failure and peer rejection. Delinquent activity, especially the involvement in youth gangs, may also be caused by a desire for protection against violence or financial hardship. Juvenile offenders can view delinquent activity as a means of gaining access to resources to protect against such threats. Research by Carrie Dabb indicates that even changes in the weather can increase the likelihood of children exhibiting deviant behavior.

== Family environment ==
Family factors that may have an influence on offending include: the level of parental supervision, the way parents discipline a child, parental conflict or separation, criminal activity by parents or siblings, parental abuse or neglect, and the quality of the parent-child relationship. As mentioned above, parenting style is not of the largest predictors of juvenile delinquency. There are 4 categories of parenting styles which describe the attitudes and behaviors that parents express while raising their children.

- Authoritative parenting is characterized by warmth and support in addition to discipline.
- Indulgent parenting is characterized by warmth and regard towards their children but lack structure and discipline.
- Authoritarian parenting is characterized by high discipline without the warmth thus leading to often hostile demeanor and harsh correction
- Neglectful parenting is both non responsive and non demanding. The child is not engaged either affectionately or disciplinary by the parent.

According to research done by Laura E. Berk, the style of parenting that would be most beneficial for a child, based on studies conducted by Diana Baumrind (1971) is the authoritative child-rearing style because it combines acceptance with discipline to render healthy development for the child.

As concluded in Steinberg's Adolescence, children brought up by single parents are more likely to live in poverty and engage in delinquent behavior than those who live with both parents. However, according to research done by Graham and Bowling, once the attachment a child feels towards their parent(s) and the level of parental supervision are taken into account, children in single parent families are no more likely to offend than others. It was seen that when a child has low parental supervision they are much more likely to offend. Negative peer group association is more likely when adolescents are left unsupervised. A lack of supervision is also connected to poor relationships between children and parents. Children who are often in conflict with their parents may be less willing to discuss their activities with them. Conflict between a child's parents is also much more closely linked to offending than being raised by a lone parent.

Adolescents with siblings who have committed crimes are more likely to be influenced by their siblings and become delinquent if the sibling is older, of the same sex/gender, and maintains a good relationship with the child. Cases where a younger criminal sibling influences an older one are rare. An aggressive more hostile sibling is less likely to influence a younger sibling in the direction of delinquency, if anything, the more strained the relationship between the siblings, the less they will want to be an influence on each other.

Children resulting from unintended pregnancies are more likely to exhibit delinquent behavior. They also have lower mother-child relationship quality.

=== Peer influence ===
Peer rejection in childhood is also a large predictor of juvenile delinquency. This rejection can affect the child's ability to be socialized properly and often leads them to gravitate towards anti-social peer groups. Association with anti-social groups often leads to the promotion of violent, aggressive and deviant behavior. Robert Vargas's "Being in 'Bad' Company," explains that adolescents who can choose between groups of friends are less susceptible to peer influence that could lead them to commit illegal acts. Aggressive adolescents who have been rejected by peers are also more likely to have a "hostile attribution bias", which leads people to interpret the actions of others (whether they be hostile or not) as purposefully hostile and aggressive towards them. This often leads to an impulsive and aggressive reaction.

Conformity plays a significant role in the vast impact that peer group influence has on an individual. Aronson, Wilson, & Akert (2013) point to the research experiment conducted by Solomon Asch (1956), to ascertain whether a group could influence an individual's behavior. The experiment was executed by asking a participant to determine which line in the set of 3 lines matched the length of an original line. Confederates knew the purpose of the experiment and were directed to answer the questions incorrectly during certain phases of the experiment. These confederates answered the question before the participant. The confederates answered the first few questions correctly, as did the participant. Eventually, all of the confederates started to answer incorrectly. The purpose of the experiment was to see if the group would influence the participant to answer incorrectly. Asch found that seventy-six percent of the participants conformed and answered incorrectly when influenced by the group. According to these findings, it was concluded that a peer group that is involved in deviant behavior can influence an adolescent to engage in similar activities. Once the adolescent becomes part of the group, they will be susceptible to groupthink.

=== School to prison pipeline ===
A common contributor to juvenile delinquency rates is a phenomenon referred to as the school to prison pipeline. In recent years, school disciplinary measures have become increasingly policed. According to one study, 67% of high school students attend schools with police officers. This rise in police presence is often attributed to the implementation of zero tolerance policies. Based on the "broken windows" theory of criminology and the Gun-Free Schools Act, zero tolerance policies stress the use of specific, consistent, and harsh punishment to deal with in school infractions. Often measures such as suspension or expulsion are assigned to students who deviant regardless of the reason or past disciplinary history. This use of punishment often has been linked with increasing high school drop out rates and future arrests. It was found in a 2018 study that students who received a suspension were less likely to graduate and more likely to be arrested or on probation. As stated in research by Matthew Theriot, the increased police presence in school and use of tougher punishment methods leads student actions to be criminalized and in turn referred to juvenile justice systems.

The Center on Youth Justice at the Vera Institute of Justice found that "for similar students attending similar schools, a single suspension or expulsion doubles the risk that a student will repeat a grade. Being retained a grade, especially while in middle or high school, is one of the strongest predictors of dropping out. In a national longitudinal study, it was reported that youth with a prior suspension were 68% more likely to dropout of school.

The school to prison pipeline disproportionately affects minority students. According to data compiled by the United States Government Accountability Office, 39% of students who received a suspension in the 2013–14 school year were Black, even though Black students accounted for only about 15% of public school students. This over-representation applied to both boys and girls of African descent. Compared to White students, Black students were expelled or suspended 3 times as frequently.

== Personality factors ==
Juvenile delinquency is the unlawful activities by minors in their teen or pre-teen years. It is influenced by four main risk factors, namely: personality, background, state of mind and drugs.

=== Gender ===
Gender is another risk factor in regards to influencing delinquent behavior. The predictors of different types of delinquency vary across females and males for various reasons, but a common underlying reason for this is socialization. Different predictors of delinquency emerge when analyzing distinct offending types across gender, but overall it is evident that males commit more crimes than females. Across all offenses, females are less likely to be involved in delinquent acts than males. Females not only commit fewer offenses, but they also commit less serious offenses.

Socialization plays a key role in the gender gap in delinquency because male and female juveniles are often socialized differently. Girls' and boys' experiences are heavily mediated by gender, which alters their interactions in society. Males and females are differently controlled and bonded, suggesting that they will not make the same choices and may follow different paths of delinquency. Social bonds are important for both males and females, but different aspects of the bond are relevant for each gender. The degree of involvement in social settings is a significant predictor of male's violent delinquency, but is not significant for females. Males tend to be more connected with their peer relationships which in effect has a stronger influence on their behavior. Association with delinquent peers is one of the strongest correlates of juvenile delinquency, and much of the gender gap can be accounted for by the fact that males are more likely to have friends that support delinquent behavior. Delinquent peers are positively and significantly related to delinquency in males but delinquent peers are negatively and insignificantly related to delinquency for females. As for females, familial functioning relationships have shown to be more important. Female juveniles tend to be more strongly connected with their families, the disconnect or the lack of socialization between their family members can significantly predict their likelihood of committing crimes as juveniles and even as adults. When the family is disrupted, females are more likely to engage in delinquent behavior than males. Boys, however, tend to be less connected to their family and are not as affected by these relationships. When it comes to minor offenses such as fighting, vandalism, shoplifting, and the carrying of weapons, differences in gender are limited because they are most common among both males as well as females. Elements of the social bond, social disorganization, routine activities, opportunity, and attitudes towards violence are also related to delinquent behavior among both males and females.

=== Neurological ===
Individual psychological or behavioral risk factors that may make offending more likely include low intelligence, impulsiveness or the inability to delay gratification, aggression, lack of empathy, and restlessness. Other risk factors that may be evident during childhood and adolescence include, aggressive or troublesome behavior, language delays or impairments, lack of emotional control (learning to control one's anger), and cruelty to animals.

Children with low intelligence are more likely to do badly in school. This may increase the chances of offending because low educational attainment, a low attachment to school, and low educational aspirations are all risk factors for offending in themselves. Children who perform poorly at school are also more likely to be truant, and the status offense of truancy is linked to further offending.

Impulsiveness is seen by some as the key aspect of a child's personality that predicts offending. However, it is not clear whether these aspects of personality are a result of "deficits in the executive functions of the brain" or a result of parental influences or other social factors. In any event, studies of adolescent development show that teenagers are more prone to risk-taking, which may explain the high disproportionate rate of offending among adolescents.

=== Psychological ===
Juvenile delinquents are often diagnosed with different disorders. Around six to sixteen percent of male teens and two to nine percent of female teens have a conduct disorder. These can vary from oppositional-defiant disorder, which is not necessarily aggressive, to antisocial personality disorder, often diagnosed among psychopaths. A conduct disorder can develop during childhood and then manifest itself during adolescence.

Juvenile delinquents who have recurring encounters with the criminal justice system, or in other words those who are life-course-persistent offenders, are sometimes diagnosed with conduct disorders because they show a continuous disregard for their own and others safety and/or property. Once the juvenile continues to exhibit the same behavioral patterns and turns eighteen he is then at risk of being diagnosed with antisocial personality disorder and much more prone to become a serious criminal offender. One of the main components used in diagnosing an adult with antisocial personality disorder consists of presenting documented history of conduct disorder before the age of 15. These two personality disorders are analogous in their erratic and aggressive behavior. This is why habitual juvenile offenders diagnosed with conduct disorder are likely to exhibit signs of antisocial personality disorder early in life and then as they mature. Some times these juveniles reach maturation and they develop into career criminals, or life-course-persistent offenders. "Career criminals begin committing antisocial behavior before entering grade school and are versatile in that they engage in an array of destructive behaviors, offend at exceedingly high rates, and are less likely to quit committing crime as they age."

Quantitative research was completed on 9,945 juvenile male offenders between the ages of 10 and 18 in Philadelphia, Pennsylvania in the 1970s. The longitudinal birth cohort was used to examine a trend among a small percentage of career criminals who accounted for the largest percentage of crime activity. The trend exhibited a new phenomenon among habitual offenders. The phenomenon indicated that only 6% of the youth qualified under their definition of a habitual offender (known today as life-course persistent offenders, or career criminals) and yet were responsible for 52% of the delinquency within the entire study. The same 6% of chronic offenders accounted for 71% of the murders and 69% of the aggravated assaults. This phenomenon was later researched among an adult population in 1977 and resulted in similar findings. S. A. Mednick did a birth cohort of 30,000 males and found that 1% of the males were responsible for more than half of the criminal activity. The habitual crime behavior found among juveniles is similar to that of adults. As stated before most life-course persistent offenders begin exhibiting antisocial, violent, and/or delinquent behavior, prior to adolescence. Therefore, while there is a high rate of juvenile delinquency, it is the small percentage of life-course persistent, career criminals that are responsible for most of the violent crimes.

== Criminology ==
There are a multitude of different theories on the causes of crime (criminology) most, if not all, of which are applicable to the causes of juvenile delinquency.

=== Rational choice ===
Classical criminology stresses that the causes of crime lie within individual offenders, rather than in their external environment. For classicists, offenders are motivated by rational self-interest, and the importance of free will and personal responsibility is emphasized. Rational choice theory is the clearest example of that idea. Delinquency is one of the major factors motivated by rational choice.

=== Social disorganization ===
Current positivist approaches generally focus on the culture. A type of criminological theory attributing variation in crime and delinquency over time and among territories to the absence or breakdown of communal institutions (such as family, school, church, and social groups) and communal relationships that traditionally encouraged cooperative relationships among people.

=== Strain ===
Strain theory is associated mainly with the work of Robert K. Merton, who felt that there are institutionalized paths to success in society. Strain theory holds that crime is caused by the difficulty for those in poverty have to achieve socially-valued goals by legitimate means. Since those with, for instance, poor educational attainment have difficulty achieving wealth and status by securing well-paid employment, they are more likely to use criminal means to obtain those goals. Merton's suggests five adaptations to this dilemma:

1. Innovation: individuals who accept socially-approved goals but not necessarily the socially-approved means.
2. Retreatism: those who reject socially-approved goals and the means for acquiring them.
3. Ritualism: those who buy into a system of socially-approved means but lose sight of the goals. Merton believed that drug users are in this category.
4. Conformity: those who conform to the system's means and goals.
5. Rebellion: people who negate socially-approved goals and means by creating a new system of acceptable goals and means.

A difficulty with strain theory is that it does not explore why children of low-income families have poor educational attainment in the first place. More importantly, much youth crime does not have an economic motivation. Strain theory fails to explain violent crime, the type of youth crime that causes most anxiety to the public.

=== Differential association ===
Differential association is another theory that deals with young people in a group context and looks at how peer pressure and the existence of gangs could lead them into crime. It suggests young people are motivated to commit crimes by delinquent peers and learn criminal skills from them. The diminished influence of peers after men marry has also been cited as a factor in desisting from offending. There is strong evidence that young people with criminal friends are more likely to commit crimes themselves. However, offenders may prefer to associate with one another, rather than delinquent peers causing someone to start offending. Furthermore, there is the question of how the delinquent peer group initially became delinquent.

=== Labeling ===
Labeling theory is a concept in criminology that aims to explain deviant behavior from the social context, rather the individual themselves. It is part of interactionism criminology, which states that once young people have been labeled as criminal, they are more likely to offend. The idea is that once labelled as deviant, a young person may accept that role and be more likely to associate with others who have been similarly labeled. Labelling theorists say that male children from poor families are more likely to be labelled deviant, which may partially explain the existence of more working-class young male offenders.

=== Social control ===
Social control theory proposes that exploiting the process of socialization and social learning builds self-control and can reduce the inclination to indulge in behavior that is recognized as antisocial. These four types of control can help prevent juvenile delinquency:

Direct by which punishment is threatened or applied for wrongful behavior, and compliance is rewarded by parents, family, and authority figures. Internal by which a youth refrains from delinquency through the conscience or superego. Indirect by identification with those who influence behavior, such as because the delinquent act might cause pain and disappointment to parents and others close relationships. Control through needs satisfaction: if all an individual's needs are met, there is no point in criminal activity.

== Punishment ==
In 2020 a ruling abolished the death penalty for juveniles in Saudi Arabia. Despite this Mustafa Hashem al-Darwish was executed in June 2021. He was alleged to have of taken part in anti-government demonstrations at the age of 17. al-Darwish had been detained in May 2015 being placed in solitary confinement for years. al-Darwish claimed that he faced brutal torture and beatings and was forced to sign confessions.

One criminal justice approach to juvenile delinquency is through the juvenile court systems. These courts are specifically for minors to be tried in. Sometimes, juvenile offenders are sent to adult prisons. In the United States, children as young as 8 can be tried and convicted as adults. Additionally, the United States was the only recorded country to sentence children as young as 13 to life sentences without parole also known as death in prison sentences. As of 2012, the Supreme Court has declared death in prison sentences unconstitutional for the vast majority of cases involving children. According to the US Department of Justice, about 3,600 children are housed in adult jails.

According to a report released by the Prison Policy Initiative, over 48,000 children are held in juvenile detention centers or prisons in America. The worldwide number is unknown but UNICEF estimates that over 1 million children experience confinement in various countries. Juveniles in youth detention centers are sometimes subject to many of the same punishments as adults, such as solitary confinement, despite a younger age or the presence of disabilities. Due to the influx of minors in detention facilities due to the school to prison pipeline, education is increasingly becoming a concern. Children in juvenile detention have a compromised or nonexistent schooling which to a higher number of drop outs and failure to complete secondary education.

Parents can carry vicarious liability for juvenile delinquency of their children.

== Prevention ==
Delinquency prevention is the broad term for all efforts aimed at preventing youth from becoming involved in criminal, or other antisocial, activity. Prevention services may include activities such as substance abuse education and treatment, family counseling, youth mentoring, parenting education, educational support, and youth sheltering. Increasing availability and use of family planning services, including education and contraceptives helps to reduce unintended pregnancy and unwanted births, which are risk factors for delinquency. It has been noted that often interventions such as peer groups may leave at-risk children worse off than if there had never been an intervention.

=== Policies ===
Education promotes economic growth, national productivity and innovation, and values of democracy and social cohesion. Prevention through education has been seen to discourage delinquency for minors and help them strengthen the connection and understanding between peers

A well-known intervention treatment is the Scared Straight Treatment. According to research done by Scott Lilienfeld, this type of intervention is often harmful because of juvenile offenders' vicarious exposure to criminal role models and the possibility of increased resentment in reaction to the confrontational interactions. It has been reasoned that the most efficient interventions are those that not only separate at-risk teens from anti-social peers, and place them instead with pro-social ones, but also simultaneously improve their home environment by training parents with appropriate parenting styles.

In response to the data correlated with the school to prison pipeline, some institutions have implemented restorative justice policies. The restorative justice approach emphasizes conflict resolution and non-punitive intervention. Interventions such as hiring more counselors as opposed to security professionals or focusing on talking through problems would be included in a restorative justice approach.

It is also important to note certain works of legislation that have already been published in the United States in response to general prisoner re-entry, extending to juveniles, such as the Second Chance Act (2007) and most recently, the Second Chance Reauthorization Act (2018).

=== Juvenile reform ===
Juvenile reform deals with the vocational programs and educational approach to reducing recidivism rates of juvenile offenders. Most countries in the world legislate processes for juvenile reform and re-entry, some more elaborate and formal than others. In theory, juvenile re-entry is sensitive to the fact that juveniles are young and assumes they are capable of change; it approaches a juvenile offender's situation and history holistically, evaluating the earlier factors that could lead a juvenile to commit crimes. In practice, this is complicated since juvenile delinquents return home to varying and unpredictable circumstances, including poverty, substance abuse, domestic violence, etc..

In the United States, juvenile reform is split into four main phases:

1. The Entry Phase: The youth enters residential placement
2. The Placement Phase: Amount of time youth is in the placement facility (whatever that may be)
3. The Transitional Phase (re-entry): Act of leaving facility and entering community (from right after exit of facility to right before entering community)
4. The Community-based Aftercare Phase: Period of time after youth returns to the community (usually 120-day period right after transitional phase)

An understanding of the factors involved in each of these steps is crucial to creating an effective juvenile reform program. One non-profit identifies the following approaches to juvenile reform:

1. Early Intervention: preventing juvenile youth from ever encountering the justice system by implementation of conflict-resolution practices or administrative strategies that aim to teach the child healthy actions to take in difficult situations. It is implemented before any offense is committed and often involves a thorough discussion of what individual issues a child is dealing with.
2. Diversion: the placement of youth in programs that redirect youth away from juvenile justice system processing, or programs that divert youth from secure detention in a juvenile justice facility. These programs are most often in attempt to protect juveniles from getting a charge on their record after they have already committed a crime. This can be led through school administration intervention or by law enforcement officers that have been trained in dealing with at-risk youth. These programs are often given to children who have unstable life circumstances and are thus extended aid that will attack the "root problems" rather than further isolate them in society.
3. Alternatives to Secure Confinement: a juvenile justice approach that does not require the juvenile's entry in a "jail-like" facility. Often involves the juvenile's continued participation in society, but in a modified manner. Such alternatives include home confinement, supervision of a probation officer, community service requirements, and community-based facilities, among others.
4. Evidence-Based Practices: the emphasis on encouraging youth participation in programs that have evidence of working. The evaluation of "success" for a program is dependent on multiple factors, such as reduction of recidivism rates, cost-effectiveness, and addressing health problems.
5. Diverting Youth Who Commit Status Offenses: programs that address the "root" problems causing a juvenile's behavior and actions. Such programs are often part of a tiered approach to juvenile justice and reform.
6. Funding Community-Based Alternatives on a Large Scale: the supporting of all initiatives in a community that have been proven to help with juvenile betterment and reform. This allows the community to help its own and does not rely on the decisions of the state regarding the needs of juveniles.

While juvenile reform has proved to be an effective and humanizing approach response to juvenile delinquency, it is a very complex area that still has many ongoing debates. For example, many countries around the world are debating the appropriate age of a juvenile, as well as trying to understand whether there are some crimes that are so heinous, they should be exempt from any understanding. Based on these discussions, legislation needs to be consistently updated and considered as social, cultural, and political landscapes change.

== Juvenile sex crimes ==
Juveniles who commit sexual crimes refer to individuals adjudicated in a criminal court for a sexual crime. Sex crimes are defined as sexually abusive behavior committed by a person under the age of 18 that is perpetrated "against the victim's will, without consent, and in an aggressive, exploitative, manipulative, and/or threatening manner". It is important to utilize appropriate terminology for juvenile sex offenders. Harsh and inappropriate expressions include terms such as "pedophile, child molester, predator, perpetrator, and mini-perp". These terms have often been associated with this group, regardless of the youth's age, diagnosis, cognitive abilities, or developmental stage. Using appropriate expressions can facilitate a more accurate depiction of juvenile sex offenders and may decrease the subsequent aversive psychological affects from using such labels. In the Arab states of the Persian Gulf, homosexual acts are classified as an offense, and constitute one of the primary crimes for which juvenile males are charged.

=== Prevalence data ===
Examining prevalence data and the characteristics of juvenile sex offenders is a fundamental component to obtain a precise understanding of this heterogeneous group. With mandatory reporting laws in place, it became a necessity for providers to report any incidents of disclosed sexual abuse. Longo and Prescott indicate that juveniles commit approximately 30-60% of all child sexual abuse. The Federal Bureau of Investigation Uniform Crime Reports indicate that in 2008 youth under the age of 18 accounted for 16.7% of forcible rapes and 20.61% of other sexual offenses. Center for Sex Offender Management indicates that approximately one-fifth of all rapes and one-half of all sexual child molestation can be accounted for by juveniles.

=== Official record data ===
The Office of Juvenile Justice and Delinquency Prevention indicates that 15% of juvenile arrests occurred for rape in 2006, and 12% were clearance (resolved by an arrest). The total number of juvenile arrests in 2006 for forcible rape was 3,610 with 2% being female and 36% being under the age of 15 years. This trend has declined throughout the years with forcible rape from 1997–2006 being −30% and from 2005 to 2006 being −10%. The OJJDP reports that the juvenile arrest rate for forcible rape increased from the early 1980s through the 1990s and at that time it fell again. Violent crime rates in the U.S. have been on a steady decline since the 1990s. The OJJDP also reported that the total number of juvenile arrests in 2006 for sex offenses (other than forcible rape) was 15,900 with 10% being female and 47% being under the age of 15. There was again a decrease with the trend throughout the years with sex offenses from 1997 to 2006 being −16% and from 2005 to 2006 being −9%.

=== Males who commit sexual crimes ===
Barbaree and Marshall indicate that juvenile males contribute to the majority of sex crimes, with 2–4% of adolescent males having reported committing sexually assaultive behavior, and 20% of all rapes and 30–50% of all child molestation are perpetrated by adolescent males. It is clear that males are over-represented in this population. This is consistent with Ryan and Lane's research indicating that males account for 91-93% of the reported juvenile sex offenses. Righthand and Welch reported that females account for an estimated 2–11% of incidents of sexual offending. In addition, it reported by The Office of Juvenile Justice and Delinquency Prevention that in the juvenile arrests during 2006, African American male youth were disproportionately arrested (34%) for forcible rape. In one case in a foster home a 13-year-old boy raped a 9-year-old boy by having forced anal sex with him. In a court hearing the 9-year-old boy said he had done this multiple times. The 13-year-old boy was charged for sexual assault.

=== Juvenile sex crimes internationally ===
Sexual crimes committed by juveniles are not just an issue in the United States. Studies from the Netherlands show that out of 3,200 sex offenders recorded by police in 2009, 672 of those were juveniles, approximately 21 percent of sexual offenders. The study also points out the male to female ratio of sexual predators.

In 2009, a U.S. congressman proposed legislation that would create an International Sex Offender Registry. The bill was introduced due to the fact that because laws differ in different countries, someone who is on the sex offender registry in the U.S. who may be barred from living certain places and doing certain activities has free range in other less developed countries. This can lead to child sex tourism, when a sexual predator will go to less developed countries and prey on young boys and girls. Karne Newburn in his article, The Prospect of an International Sex Offender Registry, pointed out some serious flaws in the proposed bill, such as creating safety issues within the communities for the sex offenders placed on the registry. Newburn suggested instead of creating an International Sex Offender Registry from the U.S. model the U.S. join other countries in a dialogue on creating an effective model. As of now no registry exists. Despite this there is still interest in creating some sort of international registry.

== By country ==
=== United Kingdom ===
The United Kingdom has three separate and distinct criminal justice systems: England and Wales, Northern Ireland, and Scotland. Young offenders are often dealt with by the Youth Offending Team. There is concern young adult offenders are not getting the support they need to help them avoid reoffending.

In England and Wales the age of criminal responsibility is set at 10. Young offenders aged 10 to 17 (i.e. up to their 18th birthday) are classed as a juvenile offender. Between the ages of 18 and 20 (i.e. up to their 21st birthday) they are classed as young offenders. Offenders aged 21 and over are known as adult offenders.

In Scotland the age of criminal responsibility was formerly set at 8, one of the lowest ages of criminal responsibility in Europe. It has since been raised to 12 by the Criminal Justice and Licensing (Scotland) Act 2010, which received Royal Assent on 6 August 2010.

In Northern Ireland, the age of criminal responsibility is 10.

In 2008, police rolled out Operation Staysafe, which allowed police to hand over juvenile delinquents to a social worker.

=== Canada ===
In Canada, the YCJA protects the rights of young offenders. It has four main goals to ensure the youth is subject to meaningful consequences that promote the long-term protection of society, to rehabilitate and reintegrate the youth into society seamlessly, and to prevent crime by examining the underlying causes. The YCJA was introduced in 2003, succeeding the Young Offender's Act.

=== Northern Europe ===
In both Denmark and Sweden, the age of criminal responsibility is set at 15. In Sweden it has been 15 since 1902.

=== Japan ===
While the maximum age in some US states has increased, Japan has lowered the juvenile delinquent age from under 20 to under 18. This change occurred on 1 April 2022 when the Japanese Diet activated a law lowering the age of minor status in the country.

=== United States ===
In the United States, the age of criminal responsibility for federal crimes is set at 11. While this has been set at the federal level, each state is responsible for setting their own age of criminal responsibility. 31 states have no minimum age for criminal responsibility, while the remaining 19 do. In the United States, a juvenile delinquent is a person who commits a crime and is under a specific age. Most states specify a juvenile delinquent, or young offender, as an individual under 18 years of age, while a few states have set the maximum age slightly different. North Carolina has the lowest responsibility age of 6 years old and Massachusetts has the highest of 12 years old.

There are 1.5 million cases per year in the US that handle status offenses or criminal offenses by young offenders. However, only 52 juveniles were fully sentenced to prison-time between 2010–2015. Recidivism is common among young offenders, with 67% becoming repeat offenders.

The term "juvenile delinquent" originated from the late 18th and early 19th centuries when the treatment of juvenile and adult criminals was similar, and punishment was over the seriousness of an offense. Before the 18th century, juveniles over age 7 were tried in the same criminal court as adults and, if convicted, could get the death penalty. Illinois established the first juvenile court. This juvenile court focused on treatment objectives instead of punishment, determined appropriate terminology associated with juvenile offenders, and made juvenile records confidential. In 2021, Michigan, New York, and Vermont raised the maximum age to under 19, and Vermont law was updated again in 2022 to include individuals under 20. Only three states, Georgia, Texas, and Wisconsin, still appropriate the age of a juvenile delinquent as someone under the age of 17.

Just as there are differences in the maximum age of a juvenile delinquent, the minimum age for a child to be considered capable of delinquency or the age of criminal responsibility varies considerably between the states. Some states that impose a minimum age have made recent amendments to raise the minimum age. Still, most states remain ambiguous on the minimum age for a child to be determined a juvenile delinquent. In 2021, North Carolina changed the minimum age from 6 to 10 years old, Connecticut moved from 7 to 10, and New York adjusted from 7 to 12. In some states, the minimum age depends on the seriousness of the crime committed. Juvenile delinquents or juvenile offenders commit crimes ranging from status offenses such as, truancy, violating a curfew or underage drinking and smoking to more serious offenses categorized as property crimes, violent crimes, sexual offenses, and cybercrimes.

=== Brazil ===
In Brazil, the age of criminal responsibility is set at the age of 18. Anyone that is found guilty of committing crimes prior to the age of 18 is treated to other options rather than jail. These include, for children under 12, foster care options in order to get them a safer family, and, for young offenders over 12, being sentenced to complying with a range of socio-educative measures that can go from a warning to community work and even to internment in specialized facilities, which include basic schooling and occupational training courses that aim at preventing the offenders from resorting to crime to support themselves, although conditions in such facilities are often subpar. With a spike in crime rates among young offenders occurring in 2015, along with an almost 40% increase in internments of young offenders, there was a push to lower the age of criminal responsibility to 16, which ultimately failed.

=== China ===
Juvenile crime has risen in China with an average increase of 5% per year. In 2021, China lowered the age of criminal responsibility from 14 to 12 in an amendment to its criminal law, and it mandated that such prosecution must be approved by the Supreme People's Procuratorate.

=== Nigeria ===
In Nigeria, juvenile delinquency refers to criminal or antisocial behaviour committed by young persons generally under the age of 18. Under Nigerian law, the age of criminal responsibility and how young offenders are treated varies depending on the specific legal framework applied. The Constitution and the Child Rights Act 2003 define a child as a person under 18 years, and the Child Rights Act is intended to guide how children in conflict with the law are handled nationwide, though it has not been adopted uniformly by all states. Federal law, including the Administration of Criminal Justice Act 2015, distinguishes between age groups: a child under 7 years is not criminally responsible, while those aged 7 to under 12 are generally presumed not responsible unless proven to understand the wrongfulness of their act. From age 12 onwards, individuals begin to be treated as capable of criminal responsibility in appropriate circumstances.

The juvenile justice system in Nigeria is meant to focus on rehabilitation rather than punishment. Children and young persons who commit offences are ordinarily dealt with by special courts and may be placed in institutions such as remand homes, approved schools, or borstal centres rather than regular adult prisons. Remand homes are used for juveniles awaiting trial or in need of care, while approved schools and borstals provide training and education aimed at correcting behaviour and preparing youths for reintegration into society. Office of Justice Programs Despite these legal provisions, juvenile delinquency in Nigeria remains a significant concern. Common offences among youths include truancy, stealing, robbery and other property crimes, with research showing that factors such as poverty, poor parental supervision, school dropout, and peer pressure contribute to delinquent behaviour. Critics argue that existing laws and institutions are outdated, unevenly implemented, and inadequately resourced, leading to situations where young offenders are sometimes treated like adults in practice, or placed in custodial settings with insufficient rehabilitative support. Advocates for reform call for clearer, more humane age thresholds and stronger investment in non-custodial, child-centred interventions to better prevent and address juvenile delinquency across the country.

== See also ==
- Age of onset (criminology)
- Anti-social behaviour order
- Bad boy archetype
- Banchō (position)
- Defense of infancy
- Deviance (sociology)
- His Majesty's Young Offender Institution
- Juvenile court
- Juvenile delinquency in the United States
- Kazan phenomenon
- Minor (law)
- David Morgan
- Office of Juvenile Justice and Delinquency Prevention
- Operation Staysafe
- Person in need of supervision
- Public criminology
- Sex offender registries in the United States
- Solitary confinement of juvenile offenders
- Status offense
- Suitable age and discretion
- Sukeban
- Teen courts
- Timeline of children's rights in the United Kingdom
- Truancy
- Victimology
- Youth court
- Youth Offending Team
- Youth Inclusion Support Panel
