= Lancashire Fire and Rescue Service =

Fire and rescue service in north west England

Operational area
- Country: England
- County: Lancashire

Agency overview
- Employees: +1,500
- Chief Fire Officer: Jon Charters

Facilities and equipment
- Stations: 40 (including USAR at Chorley)

Website
- www.lancsfirerescue.org.uk

The Lancashire Fire and Rescue Service (LFRS) is the county-wide, statutory emergency fire and rescue service for the English non-metropolitan county of Lancashire and the separate boroughs of Blackpool and Blackburn with Darwen. It is one of 45 fire and rescue services in England and operates under the governance of the Lancashire Combined Fire Authority.

The service is made up of six area commands as follows: Northern, Southern, Eastern, Western, Central and Pennine. Within these areas there are 18 wholetime, 17 retained stations and four day crewed stations providing Lancashire with 24-hour fire cover.

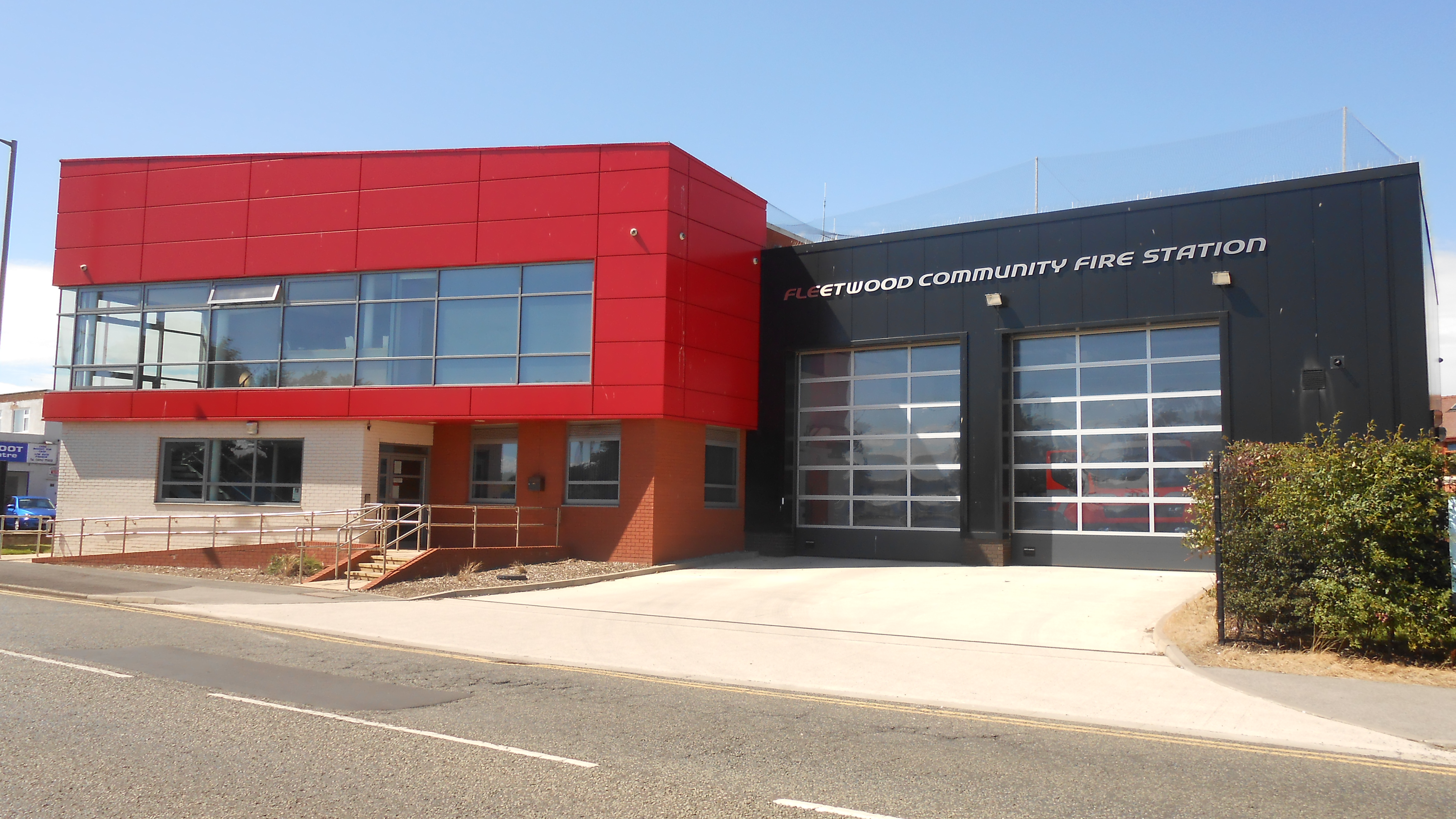
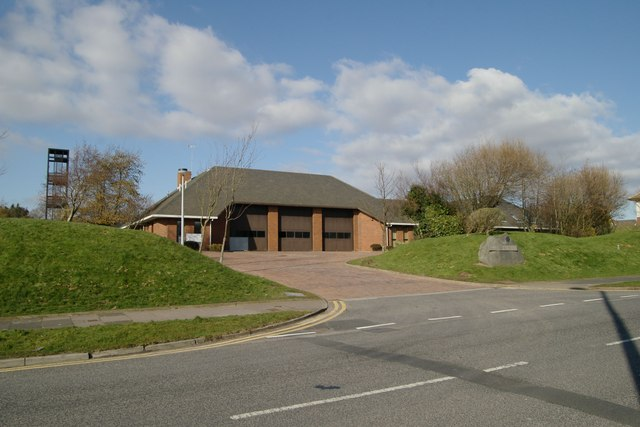
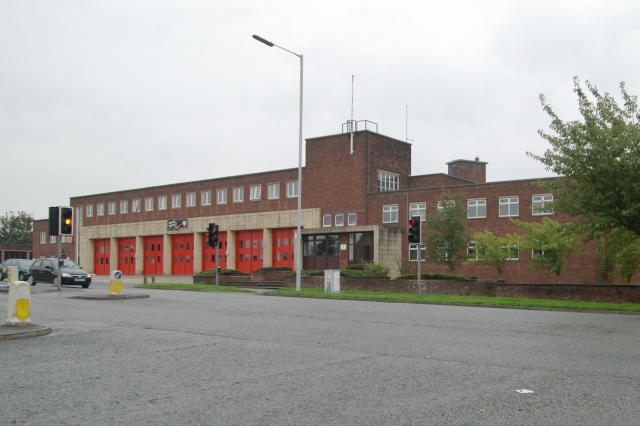
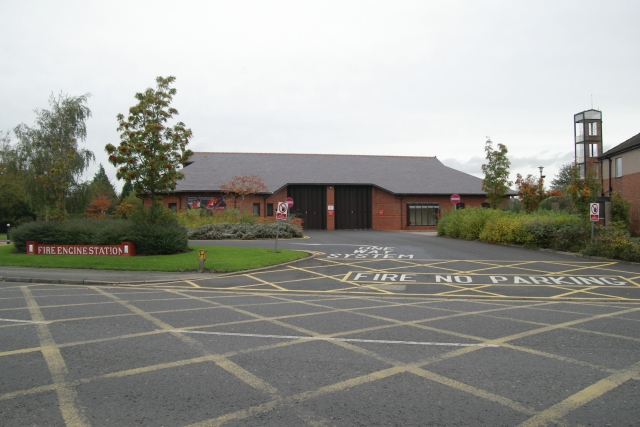
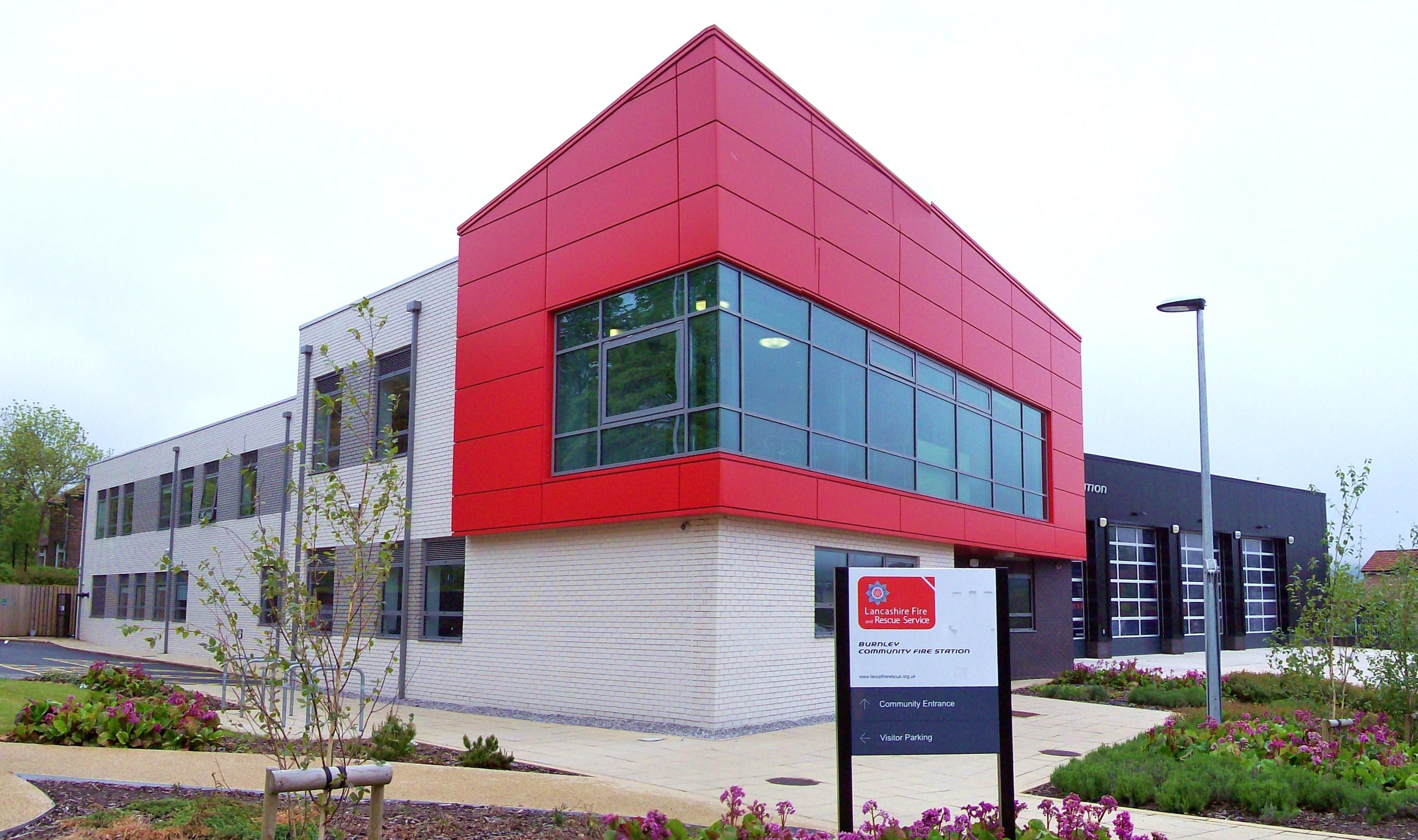
Clockwise from top left: Some of the service's fire stations in Fleetwood, Blackpool, Burnley, Ormskirk and Preston

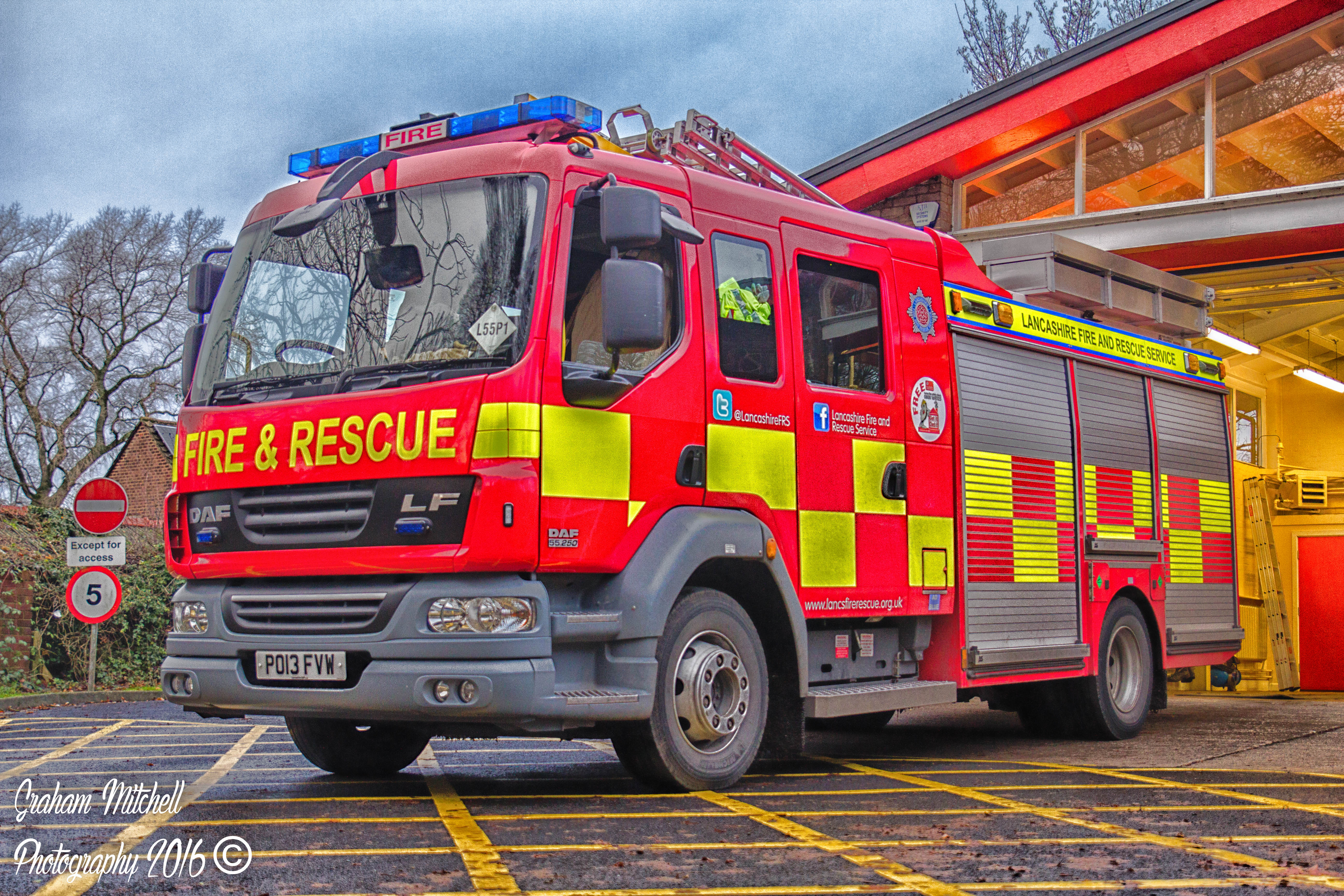
Water Rescue Ladder

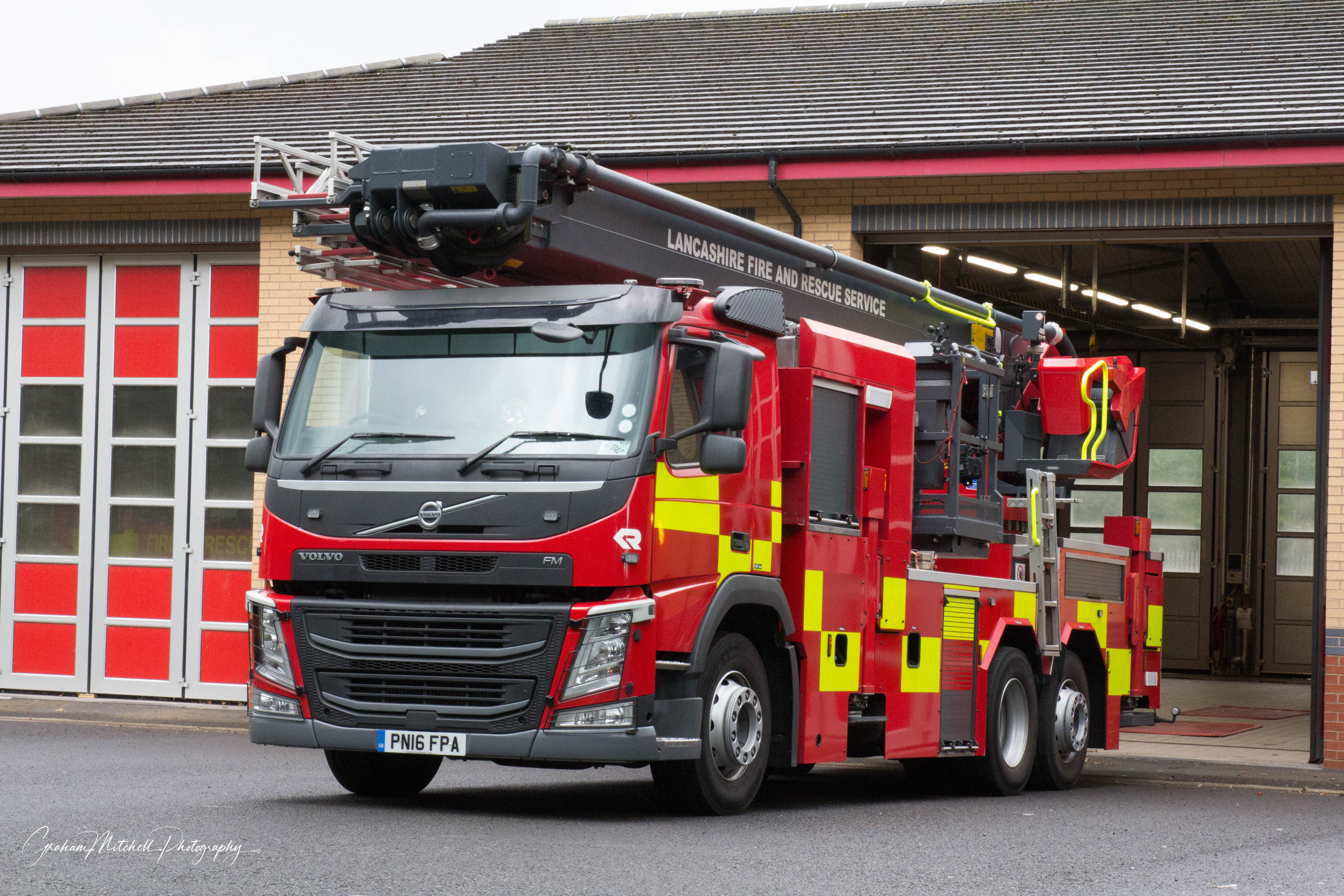
Aerial appliance

== Performance ==
Every fire and rescue service in England and Wales is periodically subjected to a statutory inspection by His Majesty's Inspectorate of Constabulary and Fire & Rescue Services (HMICFRS). The inspections investigate how well the service performs in each of three areas. On a scale of outstanding, good, requires improvement and inadequate, Lancashire Fire and Rescue Service was rated as follows:

HMICFRS Inspection Lancashire
| Area | Rating 2018/19 | Rating 2021/22 | Description |
|---|---|---|---|
| Effectiveness | Good | Good | How effective is the fire and rescue service at keeping people safe and secure from fire and other risks? |
| Efficiency | Good | Good | How efficient is the fire and rescue service at keeping people safe and secure from fire and other risks? |
| People | Good | Good | How well does the fire and rescue service look after its people? |

== History ==
Lancashire's organised fire services trace back to the 19th century with local brigades like Blackburn. The modern services was established as Lancashire County Fire Brigade in April 1948 under the Fire Services Act 1947, becoming one of the largest in Great Britain at the time with 64 stations.

It evolved through local government reorganisation. In 2002, following the creation of Blackpool and Blackburn with Darwen as unitary authorities, the service adopted its current name and structure under the Lancashire Combined Fire Authority.

== See also ==
- Fire service in the United Kingdom
- Lancashire Constabulary
- GRIP (Group Intervention Panel)
- List of British firefighters killed in the line of duty
