= Youth offending team =

Multi-agency teams in England and Wales

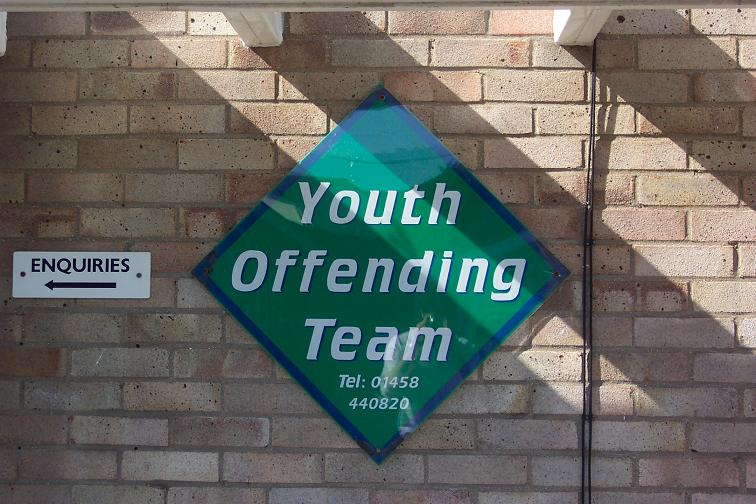
Logo of the youth offending teams outside a Somerset YOT Office.

A youth offending team (YOT) is a multi-agency team that is coordinated by a local authority in England and Wales, and overseen by the Youth Justice Board. It deals with young offenders, sets up community services and reparation plans, and attempts to prevent youth recidivism and incarceration. The term is not consistently used as these teams are often referred to as "youth offending services" or "youth justice services" depending on the local authority

Following the White Paper "No More Excuses", the Crime and Disorder Act 1998 was passed setting up YOTs and introducing a series of community-based interventions for the prevention and control of youth violence. The overall aim of the Act was to reduce the risk of young people offending and re-offending, and to provide counsel and rehabilitation to those who do offend. Youth offending teams engage in a wide variety of work with young offenders (those under 18) in order to achieve their aims. YOTs supervise young people who have been ordered by the court to serve sentences in the community or in the secure estate. Sometimes, teams organise meetings between offenders and victims to encourage apologies and reparation. These meetings are called restorative justice practices and may include family group conferences, victim-offender mediation or restorative justice circles

Youth offending teams also arrange for Appropriate Adults to accompany under 17s after their arrest in order to advise and support the young person, and observe that they are treated fairly. When a youth is arrested and unaccompanied by an adult (relation or friend who is 18 or over), the police often call the local YOT to request an appropriate adult to come to the relevant station.

== Role in the youth justice system ==
Youth Offending Teams engage young offenders in a wide range of tasks designed to put something positive back into the local community through unpaid activities, as well as preventing them from re-offending. YOTs ensure that offenders have a lower chance of re-offending by performing checkups during the rehabilitation process, checking on their accommodation, friends, possibilities of coercion into offending or drug/alcohol use, and so on.

Youth Offending Teams can also provide important information relevant to a young persons case to police officers, social workers or the courts.

All members of Youth Offending Teams have expertise in areas relevant to the care and rehabilitation of young offenders. These may include areas such as the Police Service, Probation Service, Social Services, the Health Service, Education, and Psychology.

=== Education ===
Education workers are some of the most important in Youth Offending Teams since most young offenders should be engaged with statutory full-time education. These workers liaise with schools and the education department where a young person is experiencing difficulties at school, particularly if there is a risk of exclusion or bullying.

Sometimes it can be useful for the education worker to offer a young person support with some particular aspect of his/her school work: study skills, coursework, or facilitating communication between the young person, the school, and the home. Education workers also arrange for the continuing education of young people who go into custody, particularly if they are still of school age. If possible, the workers ensure that the work done in school and custody are of equal content and quality.

School leavers also work with education workers if they need to acquire skills to apply for jobs, for example CV writing, form filling, interview advice and so on. Some educational workers also encourage young people to express their feelings in writing as a way to vent aggravation or to comprehend their difficult situation.

=== Psychology ===
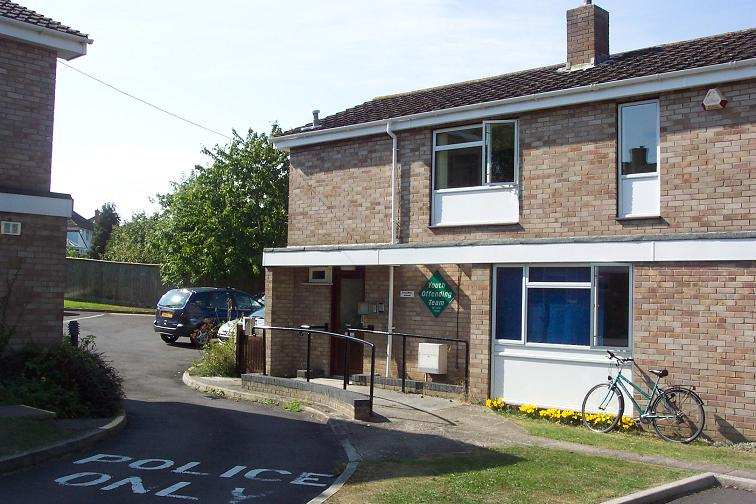
The office of the Somerset YOT, at Street.

Meetings between psychologists and the young person, their family, and the victim(s) in any combination or separately, can be arranged with some Youth Offending Teams who have psychologists on staff. These meetings base themselves on the idea that a young persons behaviour and offending is linked to other problems in his life.

The meetings are informal and typically last an hour but can vary in length depending on the preference of the young person and psychologist. While these meetings are primarily for conversation, the psychologist will sometimes employ drawing or other tests to explore problems. Occasionally the psychologist will include other family members if relevant. Sessions with the YOT psychologist normally occur every two to three weeks.

Reports made by the psychologist on the young person are included in that persons file, along with any other relevant information pertinent to the case.

== Pre-court diversions issued by police ==
Reprimands and final warnings were available to the police from 1998 until 2013, when they were replaced by the youth caution.

=== Reprimand ===
Up until 2013, for relatively minor offences, the police could issue a reprimand. This was not a criminal conviction, but the reprimand was recorded on police national computer records and any further offending would usually have resulted in a Final Warning or court appearance. A young person who received a police reprimand was not required to undertake any work with the YOT, although this may have sometimes been offered on a voluntary basis. A reprimand can be cited as a criminal record and would have to be declared for occupations exempt from the Rehabilitation of Offenders Act.

=== Final warning ===
Up until 2013, a final warning was a disposal used by the police, without a young offender (who had to admit their guilt) having to appear in court. They were issued to offenders aged 10–17. A record was made of this on the Police National Computer system. A Final Warning on a person's record influences the decision of the courts and police if a further offence is committed.

Youth Offending Teams worked to prevent young people from reoffending after a Final Warning. They would visit and assess young offenders and undertake diversionary work before (or after) the formal Final Warning was issued.

A Final Warning constitutes a criminal record but not a criminal conviction. It has to be declared when people apply for employment which is exempt from the Rehabilitation of Offenders Act.

=== Community Resolution ===
Community Resolutions (CR) are a way to deal with less serious crimes that allow police to exercise their professional judgement in how to resolve minor offences. It would normally seek to bring closure to the victim where one is identified in an informal way.

This can be delivered on the street by an officer without an arrest, for instance by asking the young person to apologise to the victim, and may involve some form of restorative justice.

There are certain conditions that need to be met before a CR can be used as a disposal method e.g. the victim agreeing to the process, the offender admitting responsibility, the offender's relevant offending history, current bail status, etc.

It can also be used after a more considered approach, such as after referral to a youth offending team for assessment, where it might be more appropriate than a youth caution or youth conditional caution. Community Resolutions do not result in a criminal record, but they are entered onto the Police National Computer (PNC) and can be revealed by certain vetting procedures, such as an enhanced CRB check.

=== Youth caution and youth conditional caution ===
Youth cautions were reintroduced by the Legal Aid, Sentencing and Punishment of Offenders Act 2012 (LASPO) in April 2013, to replace reprimands and final warnings. A youth conditional caution had already been introduced a few years earlier (first piloted in 2009). In reintroducing youth cautions the government, in essence, returned to the pre YOT ways of dealing with juvenile offenders who are not prosecuted. Like reprimands and final warnings, the juvenile has to admit the offence to receive a caution.

=== Penalty notice for disorder (PND) ===
Available for a range of offences. If the penalty notice is paid within a specified period the young person does not receive a criminal record for the offence.

=== Youth restorative disposal (YRD) or Community Resolution (CR) ===
As an alternative to one of the formal disposals listed above, the police may agree to allow the young person to apologise and/or repair damage/ make costs without any further action. This process is called restorative justice and it includes several community based practices. This type of restorative justice, out of course disposal is often used where the young person has had no previous offending history and the offence is considered to be one suitable for resolution without formal intervention. The use of such disposals varies from police force to police force. Careful monitoring of their use is required to ensure they are only used appropriately and not primarily as a means of police saving time and/or improving the 'clear up' rate.

== Possible sentences ==
=== Financial penalty ===
Up to a maximum of £1,000.

=== Conditional discharge ===
Lasting from 3 months to 3 years, with the young person being discharged on the condition that they do not commit any further offences within the specified period. If they re-offend they may be re-sentenced for the offences for which the discharge was imposed as well as the additional matters.

=== Referral orders ===
When an offender comes to Court for the first time and pleads guilty, the court issues a Referral Order. This order is designed to prevent further offending by that young person. The referral order refers the young offender to a Youth Offending Team and places the young person under their supervision for a period of 3–12 months. The Youth Offending Team will set up a Panel Meeting for Community volunteers to meet with the young person.

Community Panel Members try to agree a Referral Order Contract with the young person and their parent/carer, to prevent their further offending. Where victims of crime have agreed to attend or be represented, the victim will themselves be given the opportunity to speak about their feelings and how they have been affected. This might occur by audio, video, letter or face to face; the process is monitored by YOT team members. The contract agreed by the young person will include work on reparation to the victim(s).

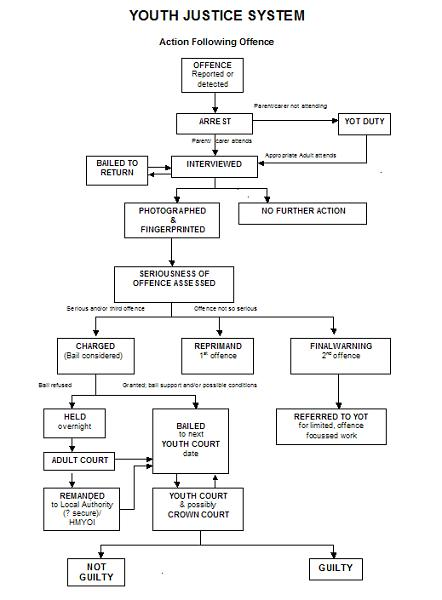
A flowchart of the procedure followed by a Youth Offending Team, assuming that guilt is admitted in respect of the Reprimand and Final Warning

At the Panel Meeting, the Community volunteers and a member of the Youth Offending Team will listen to the views of the young person regarding the offence. The views of witnesses, relatives, and the police may be represented in a report presented by the Youth Offending Team to Panel Members, and will be based on an interview with the young person and their parent/carer. Panel contracts will specify a range of programs for the young person in question. These contracts may include a letter of apology to the victims, community service, sessional training programs, or advice and support. The term of the Referral Order commences from the date signed by the young person.

If the young person fails to attend specified Panel meetings, this may lead to a reappearance in court. The violation of the contract will also lead to further legal action. Appointments and meetings must be kept. At the end of the program, the referral order is finished and the young person is released from the program. When this happens, the young person's conviction will be immediately "spent", meaning that they sometimes do not have to disclose it to employers etc.

=== Reparation order ===
Reparation orders can also be given by the court. A member of the Youth Offending Team, known as a Responsible Officer, is placed in charge of the reparation program, and will give support and advice for the offender.

During several appointments, the young person is expected to perform tasks to account for their actions. Reparation orders can last a maximum of three months, aiming to prevent re-offending and rehabilitate. As with other court orders, inappropriate actions (arriving for an appointment under the influence, using abusive language, violence, or non-cooperation) will lead to a written warning. Further infractions will lead to "breach action", at a further Court hearing.

=== Curfew orders ===
Can be enforced with a maximum of three months for under 16 year olds, six months for those older. Restriction of liberty is enforced at the courts discretion. These orders are to combat night time offending, requiring the young person to be in the confines of their home between 8:00pm and 7:00am (for example), these orders can stand alone or be added alongside a community penalty.

Note that this Order has been replaced with a Youth Rehabilitation Order for offences committed after 30 November 2009. See additional entry below.

=== Supervision order ===
A supervision order is designed to stop young people from re-offending; however it is a much stricter, and longer lasting order than a reparation. A Supervising Officer from the YOT is attached to the young person’s case and provides support and advice as the offender completes the referral and supervision order. As with the reparation order, appointments must be kept (once or twice a week for the first three months of the order, and then weeks for the second three months, and fortnightly after that) and the young person must maintain a respectful and cooperative attitude. When the order is at least half complete and if the young person has made good progress, the supervision order may be returned to the court for early revocation.

Like other orders, failure to comply at an acceptable level results in written warnings and then a further court appearance. In this second court appearance, the young person can be ordered to complete the program and issued with a fine, or resentenced for the original offence/s if the court feels it appropriate.

Note that this Order has been replaced with a Youth Rehabilitation Order for offences committed after 30 November 2009. See additional entry below.

=== Community rehabilitation orders ===
Can last up to three years, these orders also restrict the liberties of the young person, with weekly contact for the first three months, fortnightly for the next three, and monthly thereafter. This order is only for those over 16 years of age.

Note that this Order has been replaced with a Youth Rehabilitation Order for offences committed after 30 November 2009. See additional entry below.

=== Community punishment orders ===
Requiring between 40 and 240 hours of community service, or a minimum of 5 hours a week, the order must be completed in 12 months after it has been issued. Note, this order and the rehabilitation order above can be combined as one.

Note that this Order has been replaced with a Youth Rehabilitation Order for offences committed after 30 November 2009. See additional entry below.

=== Youth rehabilitation order (YRO) ===
The Criminal Justice and Immigration Act 2008 introduced this new generic community sentence, effective late 2009, replacing several existing sentences. Note that the old Orders, including some of those listed above, continue to exist for those young people who committed a criminal offence prior to the implementation date of 30 November 2009. Those young people committing an offence after this date, where the opinion of the court is to hand down a community sentence, will in most circumstances receive a Referral Order, YRO or custodial sentence.

The following community penalties have now been replaced by the YRO:

Action Plan Order
Curfew Order
Supervision Order
Community Punishment Order
Community Punishment and Rehabilitation Order
Attendance Centre Order
Drug Treatment and Testing Order
Community Rehabilitation Order

A YRO can have the following requirements attached as a condition of the court order:

Activity Requirement
Curfew Requirement (normally this is by an electronic tag, monitored via a remote phone link to a control centre)
Exclusion Requirement
Local Authority Residence Requirement
Supervision Requirement (young person is actively supervised by the Youth Offending Team).
Prohibited Activity Requirement
Drug Treatment Requirement
Residence Requirement
Attendance Centre Requirement
Unpaid Work Requirement (for those aged 16 or 17 years)
Intensive Supervision and Surveillance. This is the highest level of community sentence requirement, beyond which a custodial sentence is normally the only alternative option.

== Criticisms ==
=== Institutional Racism ===
The Youth Justice Board found using data from 2014-2015 that the following problems were found with YOTs.

- They were more likely to detain BAME, and specifically black children, than white children.
- BAME children committed less crimes but still received custodial sentences
- BAME children would enter the Criminal Justice system at a younger age and be less able to escape it

The Lammy Review in 2017 found that following these findings no substantial actions had been taken to rectify these problems.

== See also ==
- Youth Inclusion Support Panel
- GRIP (Group Intervention Panel)
