= YCO =

YCO may refer to:

- YCO - the IATA code for Kugluktuk Airport.
- YCO - a Youth Crime Officer who is part of the Youth Offending Team in a department of a police force in the United Kingdom.
