= Operation Staysafe =

Operation Staysafe is a scheme introduced in England in 2008 which gave police the power to hand young people over to social workers.

The scheme also has extra officers patrolling during the Christmas period to help reduce alcohol-related crime.

== See also ==
- Child neglect
- Juvenile delinquency
- Victimology
