= Reprimand =

Severe, formal or official reproof

A reprimand is a severe, formal or official reproof. Reprimanding takes in different forms in different legal systems. A reprimand in custody may be a formal legal action issued by a government agency or professional governing board (e.g. medical board, bar council). It may also be an administrative warning issued by an employer or school. A judge might reprimand a person in court if they have violated their release order or bail status, and place them back in custody.

== United Kingdom ==
From 1998 until 2013 in the UK, young people aged 10–17 years old could receive a reprimand (provided they had not previously been given a reprimand, a final warning or been found guilty at court). A reprimand was a formal verbal warning given by a police officer to a young person who admitted they are guilty of a 'minor' first offence.

The police would pass on the details of reprimanded young people to the local Youth Offending Team. Sometimes the young person would be referred to the YOT to take part in a voluntary programme to help them address their offending behaviour.

Reprimands and final warnings were criminal records (but not convictions) governed by provisions of the Rehabilitation of Offenders Act.

Reprimands and Final Warnings were a statutory disposal, created by sections 65–66 of the Crime and Disorder Act 1998 to replace cautions for offenders aged 17 and under. Guidance on the scheme was available for Police and Youth Offending Teams through joint Home Office/Youth Justice Board guidance published in November 2002.

In 2013 the system of cautions for young people was reintroduced, and reprimands and final warnings no longer given. This change was part of the Legal Aid, Sentencing and Punishment of Offenders Act 2012.

== United States ==
The Federation of State Medical Boards describes a reprimand as a "warning or letter of concern" that a medical board issues to a physician in response to their conduct.

== See also ==
- Censure
- Letter of reprimand
