= Quasi-criminal =

Quasi-criminal means a lawsuit or equity proceeding that has some, but not all, of the qualities of a criminal prosecution. It may appear in either a common law or a civil law jurisdiction. It refers to "a court's right to punish for actions or omissions as if they were criminal".

The origins of the phrase comes from the Latin language word, quasi, meaning somewhat, sort-of, alike or akin, to criminal law, as in quasi-contract. Quasi is used "to indicate that one subject resembles another, with which it is compared, in certain characteristics, but there are intrinsic and material differences between them".

During a civil or equity trial, a court may act as if it were a criminal case to punish a person for contempt of court. In some cases, a court may impose asset forfeiture or another penalty. For example, a court has the right to punish actions or omissions of a party in a child support case as if they were a criminal, penalizing the parent with a sentence of jail time.

== Elements ==
Quasi-criminal proceedings include a wide variety of matters, including prosecution for a violation of law or ordinance, psychiatric matters, motor vehicle law, status offenses, family court actions, and equity proceedings such as a writ. What these various legal matters have in common are these factors:

- They may be instituted by a government agent on behalf of a private citizen, or
- They may be instituted by a private citizen on behalf of the government, ex rel.
- They implicate fundamental rights or constitutional rights, subjecting the law involved to strict scrutiny by the judiciary.
  - Because of that, they may be subject to the Miranda warning enunciated under the legal doctrine in Miranda v. Arizona or foreign counterparts.
  - They are subject to requirements for bail, if any.

== Types of quasi-criminal proceedings ==
Quasi-criminal actions include:

- A violation of law, offense, or ordinance, especially a motor vehicle law, parking ticket, or traffic ticket.
- Psychiatric matters, such as civil confinement, mental hygiene commitments, and similar proceedings.
- Regulatory offenses, such as health department violations, hunting or fishing without a license, and driving while intoxicated or ability impaired (D.W.I. or D.W.A.I.) when such is not a misdemeanor.
- Family court actions, including PINS (person in need of supervision) or truancy, juvenile delinquency, child support, paternity or filiation, child custody, and child visitation ("parenting time"). It may also include, in some states, a divorce action or family offense petition.
- Equity proceedings such as a writ, qui tam, contempt of court, bankruptcy, fraud, and the like.

== See also ==
- Administrative law
- Asset forfeiture
- Car accident
- Court system of Canada
- Criminal law in Canada
- Detainee
- Equity (law)
- Hunting license
- Infraction
- Legal aid
- Prostitution in China
- Quasi-contract
- Slander and libel
- Status offense
- Strict liability (criminal)
- Summary jurisdiction
- Traffic ticket
- Trespass to Property Act (Ontario)

== External sources ==
1. Dennis P. Stolle & Mark D. Stuann, Defending Depositions in High-stakes Civil and Quasi-criminal Litigation, West. Crim. Rev. 4(2), at pp. 134–142 (2003), found at:
