= Family Group Conference =

== Definition ==
Family Group Conferencing (FGC) is one of the three most important restorative justice practices, the other two being victim-offender mediation and circles. Following a crime or harm, FGC aims to provide a route for reconciliation through a mediated formal meeting between family members and other officials such as social workers and police in regards to the care and protection or criminal offending of a child or adolescent.

== Origins ==
Some scholars have claimed that FGCs originated in New Zealand and was drawn from Māori values and culture. According to these values, the whole whānau (family & extended family members), can help and make decisions about the best way to support the family and take care of their child. It is a formal meeting in which the family, the whānau of the child, and professional practitioners work closely together to make a decision that best meet the needs of the child. The process has four main stages, which includes a meeting where professionals inform the family of the concerns they have, followed by private family time, where the family alone can develop a plan that addresses the concerns that have been raised. The plan is then presented to the professionals who should support it if the concerns have been addressed and it does not put the child at risk. The meetings are facilitated and co-ordinated by people independent of casework decisions in the agency working with the family. New Zealand's Children, Young Persons, and Their Families Act 1989 made them a central part of practice and services where serious decisions about children are to be made. FGCs are used in care and protection cases. They have also been described as the 'lynch-pin' of the New Zealand youth justice system.

== Process ==
=== Model ===
A Family Group Conference is a structured decision-making meeting made up of 'family' members. 'Family' is determined broadly, to include the children, parents, extended family, and even significant friends and neighbours to the family who may not actually be blood-related. This group of people are given 'private' time to reach a plan to facilitate the safe care and protection of a child or children in need. The professional is involved in information given at the beginning of the process and in the assessment of the plan, following a decision. All professionals are excluded from the private time, which is attended by family members only. Family Group Conferences are used to make plans for children in a number of different contexts: Child Welfare, Youth Offending, Education Welfare, Domestic Violence, Children as Young Carers, Foster Breakdown, adoption, etc. There would appear to be no particular area of work where this process is unsuitable. Some areas such as Child Protection and Youth Offending have used the process extensively, whilst others such as Education Welfare, adoption and adult services are still at the exploration stage.

Note, that if the child/children are subject to a plan, either child in need (CIN) or child protection (CP), the family plan made at a Family Group Conference would replace the current plan and become the core of the child protection process (this does not end the child protection process). This empowers families to make their own decisions for their children. Statistically families are more likely to stick to a plan made by themselves than a plan that has been made for them.

=== Principles ===
The principles that underpin the Family Group Conference process are:

- The child's interests are paramount.
- The child should have the resources made available for his or her voice to be heard.
- The child's views, feelings, and solutions are as valid as the adults participating in the process.
- Children are generally best looked after within their families. Services should seek to promote this wherever possible.
- Working in partnership with families is beneficial for children.
- Families have the ability to make rational and sound decisions about their future and the future of the children involved.
- Given the right environment and the correct information, families instinctively know what is best for the children.

The Children Act 1989 strongly reflects these principles and provides the impetus for using Family Group Conferences in practice.

=== Key elements ===
There are five defining features of the Family Group Conference process:

1. The FGC is the primary decision making forum for the child.
2. The FGC is made up of as wide a network of family members as possible (including grandparents, siblings, uncles, aunts, parents, child, family friends who may know the child but are not blood relations).
3. An independent co-ordinator facilitates the involvement of the child, family network and professionals in the Family Group Conference process.
4. The family should always have private time at the Family Group Conference to produce their plans for the child or young person.
5. The Family Group Conference plan should be agreed and resourced unless it places the child at risk of significant harm.

=== Process ===
There are four stages to a Family Group Conference; each stage of the process has equal importance. No stage should be ignored or treated with less validity than another.

- Stage 1: Information and advice.
- Stage 2: Presentation, where the police make their case, and the victim has to agree to what has been stated.
- Stage 3: Discussion and negotiation, where everyone gets involved and has their say as to what the outcome should be.
- Stage 4: Decision and resolution, which is finalising and formalising stage three.

All parties have to agree on the outcome of the conference, and the FGC then makes recommendations to the youth court which the youth court usually accepts and imposes.

=== Referral ===
The professional or the child and family can request a conference. When speaking to the family about the process it is important that the principles and elements are conveyed fully.

The referrer is vital to the success of the Family Group Conference process and they must think about their role in the Family Group Conference and be willing to invest positive time and energy into the process.

A referral meeting may be beneficial to clarify:

- Reasons for referral.
- Expectations and anxieties.
- Roles and responsibilities.
- If the referral agency is willing to accept a Family Group Conference plan, (unless it places the child at risk of harm).
- How the co-ordinator and referrer will work together, communicate and resolve difficulties that may arise during the Family Group Conference.
- Where the Family Group Conference will occur in relation to other processes (e.g., Child Protection Conferences, legal proceedings, school suspension).
- Whether there are any issues of danger for the coordinator or family members.

==== First contact ====
A decision will be taken as to how the first contact with the family will take place. When contact is made, the coordinator in consultation with the child and their immediate carer identify the family members who they would wish to attend the meeting. Contact is then made with all the identified members of the conference and a time, date and venue convenient to the family is agreed. The co-ordinator then makes contact with the referrer.

The family at this stage need to understand the:

- Reasons for the FGC, including who requested it.
- Importance and value of their involvement and contribution.
- That the process (within the five defining features) will run in a way that suits them.
- What the key stages of the FGC will be.

The Conference

==== Stage one – Information sharing ====
The coordinator welcomes the family members ensuring that the physical requirements have been dealt with adequately before commencement. The co-ordinator has the right to exclude individuals if absolutely necessary. The grounds for doing so should be explicitly stated (proven likelihood of violence or too drunk to contribute, etc.).

Once people are ready it is then time to:

- introduce individual group members, coordinator and professionals.
- Clarify the process.
- Discuss the ground rules, i.e. confidentiality, respect for self and others' views, etc.
- Reinforce that this is the family's meeting and that the process is flexible so that it suits the family.

Having welcomed the family and made the introductions it is important to share information next. This is done by:

- The professional – information is shared in a clear, jargon-free manner. All relevant information must be provided to the family, without this they cannot make an informed decision. The professional will need to voice his or her:
  - Concerns.
  - Family strengths.
  - What the family needs to think about.
  - Resources available to the family.
  - What cannot be agreed (e.g., a child cannot live with someone who may place them at risk).

==== Stage Two – Private family time ====
At this stage, the co-ordinator and the professionals withdraw leaving the family to discuss and plan in private. There are three basic tasks, which the family need to complete:

- To agree a plan that meets the needs of the child or /young person.
- To agree a contingency plan.
- To agree how to monitor and review the plan.

The co-ordinator should be available during this time if the family need any clarification or additional information.

The family should be aware that:

- They have as long as they need.
- They can come out at any time.
- Food and drink can be provided by the coordinator.
- Once they agree, a plan the coordinator can help them write it out.

==== Stage Three – Agreeing and recording the family decision ====
This final stage is vitally important both to the family and to the agency. It defines the outcome of the Family Group Conference for the child. The co-ordinator invites the family to relay their plan helping to clarify and understand each point. She or he will then:

- Write each point on a flip chart in front of the family using their own terminology, language and phrases.
- Check that all members agree to the plan or that there is a majority consensus.
- Identify parts of the plan that will need agency agreement and resources.
- Establish who will monitor the plan to make sure it is working.
- Record the plans for review, and the contingency plan.
- Having completed this task the co-ordinator will then invite the professional to comment on the plan and if it is acceptable to the agency.

NB: The Family Group Conference model, as developed in the United Kingdom, states that the family's plan should be agreed providing it does not place a child at risk of significant harm.

=== Monitoring and review ===
The model states that responsibility for monitoring the plan lies with the family group, the referrer will continue to work with the family and will monitor the family plan also but the lead must remain with the family. This is important because in order for the family to feel a sense of ownership they must also feel that they have some responsibility. There will, of course, be professional monitoring and in the instance where there is child protection proceedings this monitoring will be done at the monthly core group meetings. The level of this monitoring will depend upon the nature of the original referral. There will be differences between the level of monitoring in a child protection case and in a request for family support services. Making decisions about this will be part of casework planning and supervision.

Within the Family Group Conference there is an automatic review procedure usually within a three-month period. It should be possible for all those involved (family members and professionals) to call a review if the plan is not working, requires updating, or if anyone has new concerns to highlight. This should be made clear at the outset.

Note, that whilst during monthly core group meetings, the professionals will go through the family plan discussing what is going well and what they may be struggling with, Professionals cannot amend or ask the family to amend the family plan outside of the Family Group Conference arena. This is for two reasons, firstly not all members of the family will be present at a core group meeting, and secondly there can not be any professionals in the room with you when you are making your amendments as this may influence your decision making. If you (the family) or the professionals feel that changes are needed then the Family Group Conference coordinator will need to be contacted so that he/she can arrange a review.

== Family Group Conferences worldwide ==
FGCs are used in many countries. In the United States, they are known as Family Guided Decision Making. In the Netherlands and Flanders, they are known as Eigen Kracht Conferentieoks (Own Power Conferences).

Ireland introduced the process into legislation in 2000 under the Children's and Families Act. Every HSE now provides this service. Northern Ireland also has a country wide service although it is not legislated for it is required under government department guidelines.

The 1989 Children Act (England & Wales) like the New Zealand Children, Young Persons and their Families Act 1989 has some similar principles which underpin and inform the development of how Social Workers interact and work with children and families. The UK programme like its counterpart, has focused on these principles:

- Safeguarding children and promoting their welfare.
- Parental responsibility.
- Partnership.
- Family support.
- Contact between the child and the family.
- Reuniting children with their families.
- Respect for race, culture, language and religion.

The Act sought to minimise, where possible, the use of legal proceedings in family life and attempt to, "strike a balance between the rights of children to express their views on decisions made about their lives, the rights of parents to exercise their responsibilities towards the child and the duty of the state to intervene where the child's welfare requires it", The Children Act 1989(2).

The challenge for Social Services was how to achieve a safe balance of partnership and parental responsibility whilst protecting the child from possible or further risk. Services were developed to support the child within the home environment, Family Support Workers, HomeStart, Family Centres, etc. In most cases the family are neither consulted or had requested these services with the result that there is little change in the family circumstances and in some instances a greater dependency is created.

Family Group Conference was debated in the early 1990s as an alternative and progressive way to work with families. The successful outcomes in other countries demonstrated that this radical approach had potential. Initially eight local authorities and voluntary groups piloted the scheme with Hampshire, Essex and Wiltshire taking the lead. Careful study of the model was made and then adapted to fit with the culture and legislation.

In 2007, Germany has introduced Family Group Conferences for juveniles in Elmshorn, Schleswig-Holstein, called Gemeinschaftskonferenzen (GMK). These GMKs are organised by the Verein für Jugendhilfe Pinneberg e.V., and the Crime Prevention Council of Elmshorn. The conferences are being evaluated by Prof. Otmar Hagemann from the University of Applied Sciences, Kiel.
