= Regulatory offence =

Crime for which mens rea is not required to prove culpability

In criminal law, a regulatory offence or quasi-criminal offence is a class of crime in which the standard for proving culpability has been lowered so a mens rea (Law Latin for "guilty mind") element is not required. Such offences are used to deter potential offenders from dangerous behaviour rather than to impose punishment for moral wrongdoing.

== Absolute liability offences ==
An absolute liability offence is a type of criminal offence that does not require any fault elements (mens rea) to be proved in order to establish guilt. The prosecution only needs to show that the accused performed the prohibited act (actus reus). As such, absolute liability offences do not allow for a defence of mistake of fact.

Due to the ease in which the offence can be proven, only select offences are of this type. In most legal systems, absolute liability offences must be clearly labelled as such in the criminal code or criminal legislation.

== Public welfare offences ==
A public welfare offence is a crime for which "a reasonable person should know [that the proscribed activity] is subject to stringent public regulation and may seriously threaten the community's health or safety".

== See also ==
- Infraction
- Malum prohibitum
- Quasi-criminal
- Status offense
