= Status offense =

Action prohibited only to a certain class of people

A status offense is an action that is prohibited only to a certain class of people, and most often applied only to crimes committed by minors.

In the United States, the term status offense also refers to an offense such as a traffic violation where motive is not a consideration in determining guilt. In the United Kingdom and Europe, this type of status offense may be termed a regulatory offence or strict liability offence.

== Usage ==
Definitions of status offense vary. A neutral definition may be "[a] type of crime that is not based upon prohibited action or inaction but rests on the fact that the offender has a certain personal condition or is of a specified character." The United States Federal Sentencing Guidelines, for instance, states that a juvenile status offense is a crime which cannot be committed by an adult. For example, possession of a firearm by a minor, by definition, cannot be done by an adult. In some states, the term "status offense" does not apply to adults at all; according to Wyoming law, status offenses can be committed only by people under 18 years of age.

Juvenile status offenders are distinguished from juvenile delinquent offenders in that status offenders have not committed an act that would be considered a crime if it were committed by an adult, whereas delinquent youths have committed such an act.

Some sexting laws and broadly interpreted child pornography laws have effectively made sexting by a minor into a status offense, but it is treated by the legal system as a criminal offense, punishable by long prison terms and large fines. It is de facto a status offense since an adult is allowed to possess a nude image of themselves but a minor is not allowed to possess or distribute a nude image of themselves.

== Examples ==
Status offenses may include consumption of alcohol, truancy, and running away from home. These acts may be illegal for persons under a certain age, while remaining legal for all others, which makes them status offenses.

Status offense may also apply to other classes, including laws forbidding ownership of firearms by felons, where such ownership is otherwise legal; or residence within a given distance (typically, in America, ranging from 500 feet (150 m) to 2,500 feet (0.76 km) depending on local laws) from a school or other place where children congregate, for persons on a sex offender registry only.

Laws that prohibit certain actions to certain persons based on their sex, race, nationality, religion, etc., are also status offenses, such as a law that prohibits men from using public toilets intended for women, or – in countries where the state legal system is partially informed by Muslim Sharia law, such as Saudi Arabia – various activities prohibited to women but not men, or certain public religious activities (such a building a house of worship) prohibited to non-Muslims only.

Status offenses from the past that are no longer operative include:

- The Nuremberg Laws (Germany, 1935–1945) banned sexual relations between Jews and non-Jewish Germans.
- Various laws in the United States prohibited marriage (and, in some cases, sexual relations) between White people and African-Americans (and, in some cases, Asians and Native Americans). These were enacted at the state level; some states had anti-miscegenation laws and some did not. The first of these laws was enacted in 1691 in Virginia and the last were voided in 1967 in the Loving v. Virginia case.
- South Africa's Prohibition of Mixed Marriages Act (1949–1985) prohibited sexual relations (as well as marriages) between people of different races.
- Various other places, at other times, have promulgated anti-miscegenation laws prohibiting sexual relations between members of specified different races.

== See also ==
- Person in need of supervision
- Quasi-criminal
- Regulatory offences
- Victimless crime
- Youth rights
