= Lammy Review =

2017 report on discrimination in the UK justice system

The Lammy Review is a 2017 independent review on discrimination within the policing and criminal justice systems in the UK, led by David Lammy and commissioned by David Cameron and Theresa May. It found significant racial bias in the UK justice system.

== Key findings ==
=== Understanding BAME disproportionality ===
==== Gaps in CJS data impacting accountability ====
The Lammy Review called for the UK criminal justice system (CJS) to have more scrutiny in their data on ethnicity and religion, in order to move towards fairer treatment. It highlighted some gaps in information recorded. These gaps in reporting make it impossible to analyse whether disproportionalities are a result of charging rates, sentencing decisions or reoffending rates. The review concluded that fair treatment was more likely when institutions are open to scrutiny.

The courts and Crown Prosecution Service (CPS) do not record religion, which makes it harder to hold them accountable for discrimination. Prisons do record religion and have seen an increase in the number of Muslim prisoners by 50% in the prior ten years, from 8,900 to 13,200, but the lack on data at the courts and CPS obscure this fact. Muslims make up 15% of the prison population despite making up only 5% of the overall population. Since information on religion is not recorded at the earlier stages of the CJS, too little is known to determine the true cause of this disproportionality. The Lammy Review proved that this significant increase in prisoners could not be linked to terrorism offences, because only 175 Muslims were convicted of terrorism-related offences between 2001 and 2012 (less than 1% of the Muslim prison population). Despite this the most prominent frustration of Muslim prisoners has been found to be stereotypical portrayals of Islam, leading to unfair treatment and higher levels of restraint and segregation being used against them by staff.

Gypsies, Roma and Irish travellers are estimated to account for 5% of male prisoners, despite accounting for only 0.1% of the UK population, however this is not covered in the official CJS monitoring systems. Leaving this information out could be particularly damaging to a vulnerable group, since the Lammy Review also found that 27% of Gypsy, Roma and Traveller prisoners reported feeling depressed or suicidal on arrival compared with 15% of all prisoners. Furthermore only 35% received information on what support was available to them compared to 44% of all prisoners.

==== Relative Rate Index ====
The Lammy Review proposes that the UK should adopt a similar system to the US for attempting to gain insight into why there are disproportionalities in ethnicity at each stage of the CJS and tracing the impact of decisions made at each stage. A relative rate index (RRI) is effectively the number of people experiencing an event or outcome out of the total number who were ‘at risk’ for experiencing the event or outcome. The comparison to previous stages is particularly useful because proportionality numbers alone do not pinpoint which stages of the CJS are particularly influenced by ethnic bias.

The Lammy Review uses the example of rates of proceeding women's cases at the Crown Court or Magistrates' Court to demonstrate the method used and found that once charged Black women were 63% more likely to be proceeded to the Crown Court than White women, and Asian women were 108% more likely than White women.

==== Recommendations ====
- All stages of the CJS should collect more consistent data on religion and ethnicity, so that differences in treatment and outcomes can be examined in more detail.
- The relative rate index analysis completed as part of the Lammy review should be repeated biennially as part of the 'Statistics on Race and the Criminal Justice System' reports.
- The principle of 'explain or reform' should be applied to every CJS institution, where reforms should be introduced to address disparities between ethnic groups if an evidence based explanation cannot be provided.

=== Crown Prosecution Service ===
Arrest rates are higher across minority ethnic groups compared to white groups. Methods such as stop and search disproportionately target Black and minority ethnic groups. Once arrested, the CPS reports that suspects from different ethnic groups are charged at similar rates, with the exception of those charged for rape and domestic abuse. The report suggests that this issue can be dealt with through "race-blind" prosecuting, where identifying information (such as name and ethnicity) is redacted from case files passed by the police to CPS prosecutors.

==== Policing and prosecution of suspected gang members ====
The Review argues that the current system of policing those suspected to be part of "gangs" is both ineffective and based on misunderstanding. The Review suggests that using Modern Slavery legislation to target those at the tops of complex criminal hierarchies would be a more effective approach than targeting groups. The targeting of groups disproportionately affects BAME people in several ways:

- Joint Enterprise

One of the key tools used to prosecute suspected gang members is the doctrine of Joint Enterprise. Individuals in a "Joint Enterprise" can be either "principals" or "secondary parties" - a principal is the person that carries out the substantive offence, and the secondary party is one who assists or encourages the commission of the substantive offence. The doctrine of Joint Enterprise enables the secondary party to be prosecuted as if they were the principal offender themselves. Of the thousands that have been prosecuted under this doctrine over the last decade, a survey of prisoners suggests that half of those convicted identify as BAME.

- Trident Matrix

The Metropolitan Police, cited in the report, argue that gang affiliation and crime are "fluid and chaotic" and attempting to address associated issues on a group level is ineffective. The Metropolitan Police argue instead for targeting individual criminal activity - however, this has led to the disproportionate targeting of BAME individuals on surveillance-based databases such as The Trident Matrix. At the time of the review, records showed that 86% of names on the Trident Matrix were BAME.

==== Structural racism beyond the CPS ====
The report explains how wider systemic factors affecting BAME young people feed into the CPS. A written submission to the report's Call for Evidence by the Black Training and Enterprise Group said that "the main pathways and risk factors for young people into the youth justice system all record high levels of disproportionality: from school exclusions, the care system, Child and Adolescent Mental Health Service and first contact with the police." The London Criminal Courts Solicitors' Association's written submission states: "In the absence of educational or employment progression...it may become a default position to fall in with a 'gang'."

=== Plea Decisions ===
This section presents the significant difference in plea decisions between BAME and White ethnic groups and explains the disproportional effects of the justice system on these groups.

==== The role of plea decisions ====
Plea decisions are critical to Criminal Justice System, by providing incentives for those who have committed crimes to admit guilt, in order to prevent the stress placed on victims. Those who plead guilty can see sentences reduce by a third, or gain access to interventions which seek to keep them out of prison altogether. An example case study can be found in the Humberside Adult Female Triage pilot.

==== BAME plea decisions ====
Several older and more recent studies have found that BAME defendants are less likely to enter guilty pleas, in most types of offences. The Relative Rate Index analysis of 2014/15 data found that:

- Black and Asian men were more than one and a half times more likely to enter a ‘not guilty’ plea than White men. Mixed ethnic men were also more likely to plead not guilty.
- Black, Asian, Mixed ethnic and Chinese/Other ethnic women were all more likely than White women to enter not guilty pleas at Crown Court, with Asian women more than one and a half times more likely to do so.
- While there were too few cases to examine plea decisions for young women, young men from a Black, Asian or Mixed ethnic background were more likely to enter a not guilty plea compared to their White counterparts.

==== Lack of trust ====
The primary reason for this difference in plea decisions is a lack of trust in the Criminal Justice System among BAME communities. This makes BAME defendants less likely to cooperate with the police or trust the advice of legal aid solicitors, who can be seen as part of the ‘system’. At the same time, Black, Asian and Mixed ethnic defendants are all more likely to request legal advice in police station than their white counterparts. Instead, it is that many BAME defendants neither trust the advice that they are given, nor believe they will receive a fair hearing from magistrates. In some cases, this means defendants pleading not guilty and then electing for a jury trial at the Crown Court, rather than be tried in a Magistrate’s Court, despite the higher sentencing powers available at the Crown Court.

The suggestions as part of this section were that:

- The Home Office, the Ministry of Justice and the Legal Aid Agency should work with the Law Society and Bar Council to experiment with different approaches to explaining legal rights and options to defendants.

==== Deferred prosecutions ====
In England and Wales, an innovative scheme named Operation Turning Point was piloted from November 2011 to July 2014. It was designed with racial disparities in plea decisions in mind, and saw offenders participate without the requirement that they first admit an offence. Defendants were given the opportunity to go through a structured intervention, such as drug treatment, instead of facing criminal charges. The latest published information indicates that almost as many BAME offenders took part in the scheme as White offenders. Early evaluation of the scheme indicates that the risk of reoffending is reduced and that the cost is lower than traditional prosecutions.

The suggestions as part of this section were that:

- The ‘deferred prosecution’ model pioneered in Operation Turning Point should be rolled out for both adult and youth offenders across England and Wales. The key aspect of the model is that it provides interventions before pleas are entered rather than after.

=== Courts ===
20% of cases brought before the UK courts involve BAME defendants, despite the fact that BAME people comprise approximately 13% of the UK population. The Review finds that juries generally do not deliver racially discriminatory results. However, the review argues that more diversity is needed in the magistracy and the judiciary.

==== Magistrates ====
Magistrates deal with 90% of criminal court cases each year - those acting as magistrates do not require legal training or qualifications but are understood to be 'representatives of the people'. Of those tried at magistrates' courts, Black women, Asian women, Mixed ethnic women and Chinese/Other women were all more likely to be convicted than white women. Magistrates keep sparse records of pleas or defendants' legal representation, thus lowering accountability.

==== Sentencing and imprisonment ====
For those convicted of recordable, indictable offences in the Crown Court in 2015, there was an association between ethnicity and being sentenced to prison. An especially strong effect was observed within drug offences (within which the odds of receiving a prison sentence were around 240% higher for BAME offenders) - this is despite the fact that research has found that Black British people consume drugs at lower rates than white British people. The Review suggests that the judiciary should provide an evidence-based explanation for this disparity. Defendants can appeal sentencing decisions to the Court of Appeal but decisions will only be overturned if they are found to be made in error or "manifestly excessive". Sentencing judges are given wide discretion and the Review says that the appeal process cannot capture "collective differences" in the application of this discretion which may contribute to racially skewed incarceration rates.

=== Rehabilitation ===
This section found that there had been a lack of improvement in rehabilitation for BAME groups.

==== Probation ====
The report found that Criminal Rehabilitation Companies (CRCs), private sector companies tasked with rehabilitation low to medium risk offenders, are not giving BAME groups the specialized services that they require. Furthermore it found that offenders managed by the National Probation Service (NPS), public sector organization dealing with high risk offenders, are more likely to receive the types of support needed than with the CRCs and that CRCs were not involving specialist BAME organizations in the way that they were intended to.

The suggestions as part of this section were that:

- The Ministry of Justice should create a working group to assess what is stopping CRCs subcontracting to specialist support groups
- The Ministry of Justice should improve reporting about the CRCs handling of groups with protected characteristics (this includes BAME groups).

==== Youth Re-offending ====
The report found that there has been a history of knowledge regarding BAME children being disproportionately affected by the Criminal Justice System, specifically Youth Offending Teams (YOTs).

This previous work found that:

- Youth Offending Teams were more likely to detain black children than white children
- BAME children committed less crimes but still received custodial sentences
- BAME children would enter the Criminal Justice system at a younger age and be less able to escape it

This report found that there had been no substantial follow up of the previous findings.

The suggestions as part of this section were that:

- The Youth Justice Board should commission and publish an evaluation of what has been learned in the past and identify actions for the future

==== Work, Education and Training ====
The report found that work reduces dependency on crime and that training increases self-respect and stake in society. Therefore work is key to reducing re-offending. Despite this, previous convictions have a hugely detrimental effect on future work prospects and BAME groups are disproportionately affected as they are already more likely to be discriminated in employment. The report finds that the Criminal Record system is key in this system and needs reform.

The suggestions as part of this section were that:

- The Criminal Justice System should allow for sealing criminal records, stopping record checks seeing offenses, based on a court hearing
- The government should publish a study to highlight the cost of unemployment in ex-offenders

== 2013 Release report ==
=== The Numbers in Black And White: Ethnic Disparities In The Policing And Prosecution Of Drug Offences In England And Wales ===
Release produced a report in 2013 on the undue focus of policing and prosecution of drug offences on black and minority communities in England and Wales. The report concluded that laws on drugs in the UK are a major driver for disproportionate use of policing against and prosecutions of the black community in the UK criminal justice system. Half or more of the stop and searches carried out in the UK are for drugs, meaning from 2009 to 2012 someone was stopped and searched for drugs every 58 seconds. This was found to have a damaging impact on the free movement of citizens who have done nothing wrong, because only 7% of stop and searches for drugs result in an arrest. They argued that the low levels of detection do not justify the high levels of interference, especially at a time of austerity where policing resources should be used wisely and not on low level possession offences, which can have a serious detrimental impact on the futures of those convicted. Ultimately the report proposes the decriminalisation of drug possession offences as and effective policy solution to the wasted resources and racial profiling problems found.

The report found that Black people were more likely to be stopped and searched for drugs than white people, despite being less likely to use them. In 2009/10 the search rate for drugs for was 7 per 1000 white people, 14 per 1000 Mixed Race people, 18 per 1000 Asian people and 45 per 1000 Black people, meaning that Black people were 6.3 times more likely to be stopped and searched for drugs than white people. Conversely they found that only 5.8% of Black people use drugs, compared to 10.5% of white people.

The report found that Black people are treated more harshly for drug possession than white people. In London the Metropolitan Police charges black people at 5 times the rate of white people for cannabis possession and at 3 times the rate for cannabis warnings. In 2009/10 the Metropolitan Police charged 78% of Black people caught in possession of cocaine, compared to just 44% of white people caught.

== Government response and follow-on investigations ==
The Lammy Review was published in September 2017 and the Conservative government published the first Race Disparity Audit (RDA) in October 2017. The RDA found that children in Black and Asian households were around twice as likely to be in persistent poverty, with 1 in 4 children in Asian households and 1 in 5 children in Black households in persistent poverty, compared to 1 in 10 children in White households. It stated that Black, Pakistani and Bangladeshi people were especially likely to live in areas of deprivation.

The government then issued a response document in December 2017, setting out how they hoped to responde to each of his 35 recommendations. In June 2020 David Lammy questioned the progress of the Government's implementation of the Lammy Review. Alex Chalk responded that "Sixteen recommendations have been completed. Two have been rejected and seventeen are in progress. Of those seventeen in progress, eleven will be completed within twelve months and six thereafter." David Lammy responded that he was "disappointed [in the claims that] 16 of the recommendations I made in the Lammy Review, had been 'implemented'. When in fact the majority of them had not." He added that there is a "huge difference between implementing and completing the actions you [the Government] committed to following my recommendations". He further stated how injustices highlighted in the review had got worse since, saying "When I completed the review, 41% of children in prison came from a Black, Asian or Minority Ethnic background. Now the figure is 51%. The proportion of all stop and searches on black people has increased by 69% over 5 years. The average custodial sentence for a black person is almost 10 years longer than a white person."
