= Reparation order =

A Reparation Order (a.k.a. Community reparation order) is a remedy available in UK courts for any juvenile (10 to 17 years old) who has been convicted of an offence. It has a two-fold aim:

"to take into account the feelings and wishes of the victims of crime; to prevent the young offender from committing further offences by confronting them with the consequences of their criminal behaviour, and allowing them to make some amends."
