= Age of onset (criminology) =

Age at which person first commits a crime

Age of onset (or onset age) is a term that is used in criminology in reference to the age at which the offense of a crime is first committed by a specific person.
