= Person in need of supervision =

American legal term

A person in need of supervision (PINS) is a term frequently used by social services agencies in the United States to describe a juvenile who is not currently in the household of a parent or legal guardian, or is currently not under their control as evidenced by the person's status offense, who is not an emancipated minor. The term is often abbreviated PINS. Usually, a person in need of supervision is a runaway, an orphan, a truant, or an unruly child.

The term is most commonly used as a term of art in New York in the United States, where the term is used in a key statute governing the treatment of juveniles. Hawaii also has the term in its statutes. Virginia has a similar designation which it calls "child in need of supervision" (CHINS), not to be confused with the broader designation "child in need of services" (also abbreviated "CHINS"), the "services" in which may be disciplinary/supervisory (due to the child's misbehavior) or assistive (due to parental neglect or abuse).

== See also ==
- Parental responsibility (access and custody)
