= Youth Inclusion Support Panel =

A Youth Inclusion Support Panel (abbreviated YISP) is a British arm of local government. YISPs aim to address anti-social behaviour and offending by young people aged 8–13, though some local authorities extend the age range as high as 17.

Each YISP is a multi-disciplinary, inter-agency, voluntary service. A young person who is identified to be "at risk" of offending will be offered the chance to appear before the panel. The panel will be an ad hoc collection of professionals chosen to meet the young person's needs; typically their parents, teachers, youth workers, social workers, Child and Adolescent Mental Health Services (CAMHS) workers, or other relevant people will be involved. They will form a plan aimed at helping the young person with their behaviour, channeling them into constructive activities, and reducing the risk of offending. Other support such as anger management or parenting classes may also be offered.

In most areas, parents or carers who are concerned about their child's behaviour can refer directly to a YISP via their local council. There is no charge.

YISPs were originally piloted in April 2003, and following the successful pilot there were (as of March 2009) 122 YISPs in the UK.
