= Shinty in Russia =

Shinty is a minority sport in Russia, played primarily in Krasnodar but with some enthusiasts in Moscow.

== History of Shinty in Russia ==
Whilst Scots mercenaries may have played shinty in ancient times, shinty was almost entirely unknown in Russia, and by extension the Soviet Union, other than several Soviet diplomats being invited to a match by Sir Fitzroy Maclean in Strachur in the 1960s. It was not until the advent of the internet and the enthusiasm of a young man called Vitaliy Negoda MacDhùghaill that shinty became a sport played in the country in the 2010s.

== Krasnodar Camanachd ==
Krasnodar
- Full name: Krasnodar Camanachd Club
- Gaelic name: Comann Camanachd Krasnodar
- Founded: 2014
- Ground: Aite nam Blair, Uchhoz Kuban Soccer Pitch
- Manager: Vitaliy Negoda MacDhùghaill
Home	Away

Krasnodar Camanachd was established in 2014. In 2015 they travelled to take part in the St Andrews Sixes, where they competed in international fixtures, representing Russia against English Shinty Team and US Camanachd as well as Scottish club sides.

Whilst shinty is played in Krasnador in matches held between the members of the club, on September 11, 2016, Krasnodar traveled to Moscow to play composite rules shinty-hurling with a Moscow-based hurling team. They defeated the Moscow Kremlers 9-7.
