= Krasnodar-1 railway station =

Railway station in Krasnodar, Russia

Krasnodar-1 Краснодар-1
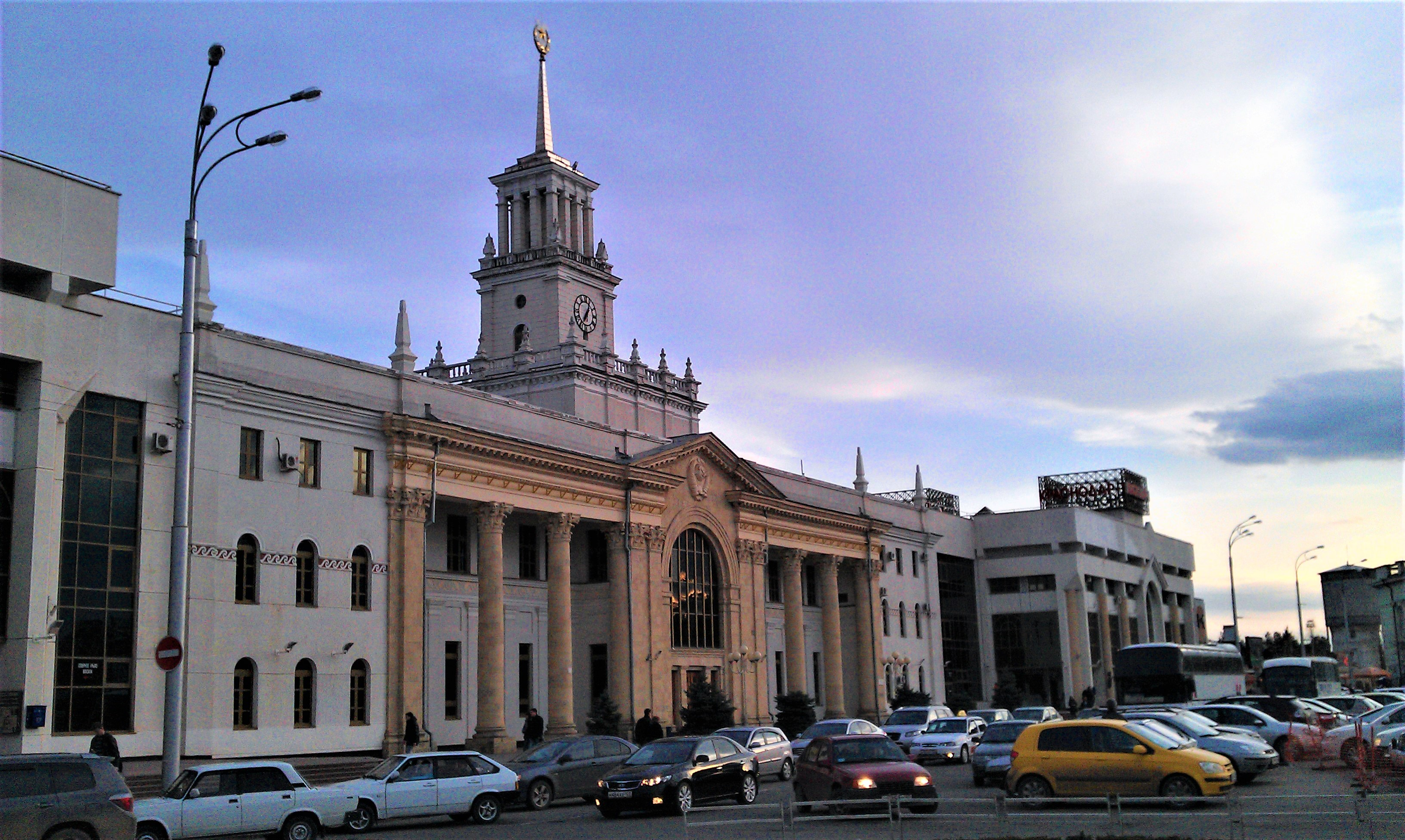
- View of the station from Privokzalnaya square.

General information
- Location: Russia, Krasnodar
- Coordinates: 45.01856°N 38.98871°E
- System: North Caucasus Railway terminal
- Owner: Russian Railways
- Platforms: 4 (3 island platforms)
- Tracks: 8

Construction
- Parking: yes

Other information
- Station code: 524404
- Fare zone: 0

History
- Opened: 1889
- Former names: Yekaterinodar (before 1920)

Services
| Preceding station | North Caucasus Railway | Following station |
Location

Krasnodar-1, also Krasnodar–Glavny (Russian: Краснодар-1 or Russian: Краснодар–Главный) is a junction railway station of North Caucasus Railway, located in Krasnodar, the administrative center of Krasnodar Krai. It is the main railway terminal of the city.

== History ==
The railway station Krasnodar-1 was first opened in 1889. The station building was completely overhauled in the early 21st century and now is not only the main railway station of Krasnodar, but throughout the North Caucasus Railway, which was formed in 1918 after the nationalization of private Railways by the RSFSR government, of the Armavir-Tuapse railway and the Vladikavkaz Railway.

== Trains ==
From Krasnodar railway station there are trains to all Russian regions and also to Belarus, Ukraine and Abkhazia.
