= Geography of Krasnodar =

Geography of Russian city

Krasnodar is a city in Southern Russia. It has a total area of 339.31 km^{2} (131.01 sq mi). It is the largest city and capital of Krasnodar Krai by population and the second-largest by area. It is the 17th-largest city in Russia as of 2010. It is located on the right bank of the Kuban River. It is 1,300 km (810 mi) south of the Russian capital and largest city Moscow. The Black Sea is just 120 km west of it. Along with surrounding areas it forms the Krasnodar City District. It is also referred to the "Southern Capital of Russia".

Location of Krasnodar City District in the Krasnodar Krai

== Overview ==
Krasnodar is located in the southern part of the East European Plain in the Prikubanskaya Plain at the center of the Krasnodar Krai, in the southern part of the Prikubanskaya Plain, in the valley of the Kuban River (on the right bank), that is, geomorphologically – on the West Kuban alluvial and proluvial plain, on the second terrace above the floodplain. The elevation of Krasnodar is low, with an even slope to the north-west. The elevation is 19 metres above sea level. The latter has a sublime hollow-relief relief and is dissected by numerous left-bank channels of the Kuban River. The Kuban itself bends around the city from the south and southwest, forming a wide (up to 15 km) trapezoidal shape at this place; the right bank is steep and high (up to 12 m), the left one is low and sloping. The width of the Kuban riverbed within the city is about 150 meters, the depth is from 1.5 to 6.5 metres.

Geographical coordinates: 45 ° 02 ′ north latitude, 38 ° 59 ′ east longitude. From north to south (within the city limits) Krasnodar stretches for 20.6 km, and from east to west for 30.1 km.

Krasnodar is located in a zone of seismic activity. Often the epicenter of the earthquake is located in the Black Sea, and seismic waves reach the coastal cities and even Krasnodar. The entire history of observations of strong earthquakes in the city was not recorded, however, in 1978 and 2002, earthquakes with an intensity of 4 to 5 points were observed.

=== Time zone ===
Moscow Time Zone

Krasnodar comes under the Moscow Time (MSK), UTC+03:00.

== Climate ==
- Average annual temperature: 12 °C
- Maximum temperature: 40.7 °C
- Minimum temperature: -32.9 °C
- Rainfall, mm: 735
- Average wind speed: 2.4 meter per second
- Air humidity: 72%
- Sunshine hours: 2,139

=== General characteristics ===
The climate of Krasnodar is transitional, from temperate continental (Dfa according to the Köppen climate classification) to dry subtropical (Cfb according to the Köppen classification). The climate is similar to cities such as Paris, Milan and New York, with mild winters without steady snow cover and hot summers.

Summer in Krasnodar is the longest season and lasts for five months (May–September). Winter in Krasnodar is short, with an average duration of 40 days, from about mid-January to late February. The shortest seasons are autumn and spring.

==== Temperature ====
The average air temperature in Krasnodar, according to many years of observations, is +12.0 °C (in the last 10 years, the average annual temperature has been kept at 13.3 °C). The coldest month in the city is January with an average temperature of + 0.8 °C. The warmest month is July, with an average daily temperature of 24.1 °C. The highest temperature recorded in Krasnodar for the entire observation period is +40.7 °C, and the lowest is -32.9 °C (January 11, 1940).

==== Rain and humidity ====
Rainfall during the year falls approximately evenly, with a small difference between the maximum and minimum. The absolute maximum occurs in June (86 mm), with a secondary maximum in December (77 mm). The minimum precipitation falls in August (44 mm). During the year, the average number of days with precipitation is about 134 (from 9 days in August to 19 days in December). The rainiest month was June 1988, when 307 mm of rain fell (at a rate of 86 mm). August 2014 turned out to be the driest month – then there was no precipitation at all. The average annual precipitation in Krasnodar is about 735 mm. Air humidity is about 72%, in the summer - 64–66%, and in the winter - 78–80%.

=== Seasons ===
==== Winter ====
Winter is usually mild, changeable, with unstable snow cover. The average daily temperature is 0 ... + 2 ° С; However, annually there are both frosts (most often in clear weather during the passage of the Arctic anticyclone) and warming up to +15 °C and above (usually when carrying warm air from the south-west). In some cold winters, temperatures can drop to −20 °C. The winter in Krasnodar is short - on average, it begins in early January and ends in mid-February, however, in fact, these periods can vary greatly. Precipitation can fall in the form of rain, rarely snow, sleet and rain. Recently, the cases of "freezing rain", which lead to serious consequences.

==== Spring ====
The beginning of spring usually falls in the middle and end of February, however, from year to year the period of the onset of spring can vary greatly: in the years with warm winters, the spring begins almost at the end of January, smoothly “flowing” from deep autumn, and in the years with severe winters the beginning of spring may be already at the end of March. March, as well as winter, is very unstable in the weather plan: warming can be sharply replaced by cold, often frost, and vice versa. Wind is also characteristic of March, often strong. The weather becomes more stable only in April, when trees begin to bloom (usually in the first half of April, but sometimes in mid-March), and the winds subside only by May. Already in early May, the average daily temperature begins to exceed +15 °C - summer is coming.

==== Summer ====
Summer is the longest season in Krasnodar. On average, its duration is 155−160 days, which is 5 months. Characterized by sunshine. In May - June temperature rarely exceeds +30 °C, however, humidity and natural convection lead to frequent short-term thunderstorm showers. In July – August, the air becomes much drier, rain and thunderstorms at this time are most often the result of the activity of atmospheric fronts, so the precipitation becomes much less. The average temperature in July and August is about +25 ° С, while the daily maximum often exceeds the 30-degree mark. Most often, it is during this period that 40-degree heat waves are observed. In September, the most comfortable weather is usually observed: in the afternoon the air is still warming up to + 25 ... + 30 ° С, however, there is no longer a strong sun, and at night a pleasant coolness falls. Usually, in the second half of September (in recent years in the first half of October), cool days with cloudy and rainy weather occur - this indicates the onset of autumn.

==== Autumn ====
Autumn comes in early to mid-October. It usually continues until the end of December, only in warm years it can last until mid-January and slowly move into spring. The average temperature does not exceed 15 ° С. There are much more cloudy days, as well as precipitation. Up to the beginning of December, it is possible to return warm (up to + 20 ... + 25 ° С), dry and sunny weather - “Indian summer”. In November, winds begin to blow, although not as strong as at the beginning of spring. In December, it is often overcast with slight but periodic precipitation. The first frosts can be observed in time from the beginning of November to mid-December, and the first snow most often occurs in late November-mid-December. However, the first snow often does not lie for more than two or three days due to the prevalence of positive temperatures, so the New Year is most often snowless.

== Hydrography ==
The Kuban River, the longest river in the entire North Caucasian region, flows through the city. Its length is 870 km, and the basin area is 57900 km^{2}. On the flat part of the river created a lot of artificial reservoirs. In the area of the city of Kuban is characterized by the tortuosity of the channel. In the course of its natural movement, the river broke through the neck loops, straightening its course. The former root formed floodplain lakes - old ladies. An example of an old lake is the Lake Old Kuban near Krasnodar.

Due to the significant slope of the channel, the Kuban is distinguished by a fast current, a great destructive force during floods and floods. The amplitude of fluctuations in the water level in Krasnodar reaches 5 meters. To regulate flow built reservoirs. In 1973, the filling of the largest artificial reservoir of the Krasnodar Krai – the Krasnodar reservoir, which finally regulated the Kuban river flow. Earlier, the Karasun river flowed through the territory of the city. Now it is Pokrovsky Lakes.

== Environmental situation ==
The environmental situation in Krasnodar is determined by researchers as tense. Of particular relevance is the problem of air pollution by road. In areas of the city through which large highways pass, the excess of the permissible rate of hydrocarbons, carbon monoxide and nitrogen oxide is recorded - from 1.5 to 7 times.

At the end of 2015 to the beginning of 2016, Krasnodar registered the most cars per capita among Russian cities. While for Moscow this figure is 846 cars per 1000 people, in Krasnodar it is 1,063 cars. In the summer, transit transport begins to play an important role, when car traffic increases to 2 million cars.

Scientists have noted a very high level of air pollution caused by the performance of electric power facilities, enterprises of the petrochemical, oil refining and fuel industries. In the center of the city, the content of nitrogen and carbon dioxide in the air is 1.5–2 times higher than in other areas. This situation is explained by the constant flow of these substances from enterprises located in other areas of the city, with prevailing westerly, northeastern and easterly winds. The industrial district of the city suffers the most from pollution, often due to improper operation or malfunction of dust collecting and gas cleaning equipment. Nevertheless, according to the results of a study conducted by the Ministry of Natural Resources and Environment in 2017, Krasnodar ranks third in the purity of air among cities in Russia with a population of over 500 thousand people.

Water bodies in the city experience a high anthropogenic load. In water, the permissible concentrations of harmful substances, including compounds of copper, iron, petroleum hydrocarbons, and nitrates, are several times exceeded.

== Administrative divisions ==
Krasnodar is part of the Krasnodar City District and that is part of the Krasnodar Krai. Krasnodar is divided into 4 districts.

District	Area (in km^{2})	Population (2018 estimate)	Head of District	Established
Western District	22	198,682	Alexander Ivanovich Kuchmin	1936
Karasunsky District	152	287,068	Nikolai Alekseevich Khropov	1973
Prikubansky District	474	408,763	Alexander Andreevich Zhuravlev	1975
Central District	28.5	225,773	Elena Yurevna Malova	1994

The formation or merger of districts can only be carried out by Krasnodar City Duma on the proposal of the Mayor of Krasnodar.

Districts are too large, so urbanites also divide Krasnodar into microdistricts. The main of them are Tsentralny, Festivalny, Cherеmushki, Gidrostroiteley, Yubileyny and Komsomolsky.

== See also ==
- Krasnodar
- Krasnodar Krai
