= Krasnodar Urban Okrug =

- District
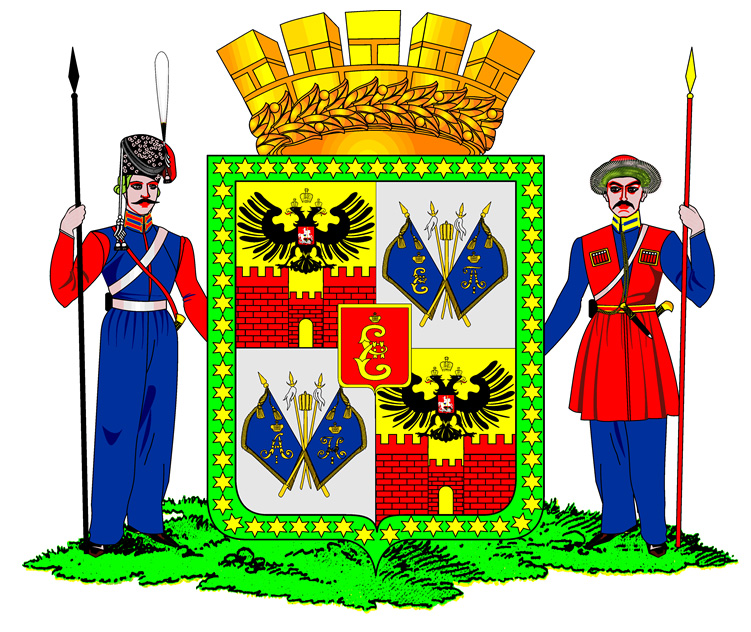
- Flag Coat of arms
- Coordinates: 45°1′59.99″N 38°58′59.99″E
- Country: Russia
- Established: 2004
- Administrative center: Krasnodar

Area
  - Total: 841.36 km^{2} (324.85 sq mi)

Population
  - Estimate (2021): 1,204,878
- Time zone: UTC+3 (MSK)
- OKTMO ID: 03701000

Krasnodar Urban Okrug is an urban okrug in Krasnodar Krai, Russia. It was established in 2004. It includes the administrative territorial entities of Yelizavetinskaya and Krasnodar. The administrative center is Krasnodar. Population: 1,204,878 (2021 Census).

== Administrative and municipal status ==
Krasnodar is the administrative center of the krai. Within the framework of administrative divisions, it is, together with twenty-nine rural localities, incorporated as the City of Krasnodar—an administrative unit with the status equal to that of the districts. As a municipal division, the City of Krasnodar is incorporated as Krasnodar Urban Okrug.
