= Krasnodar =

City in Krasnodar Krai, Russia

Krasnodar Краснодар
- City
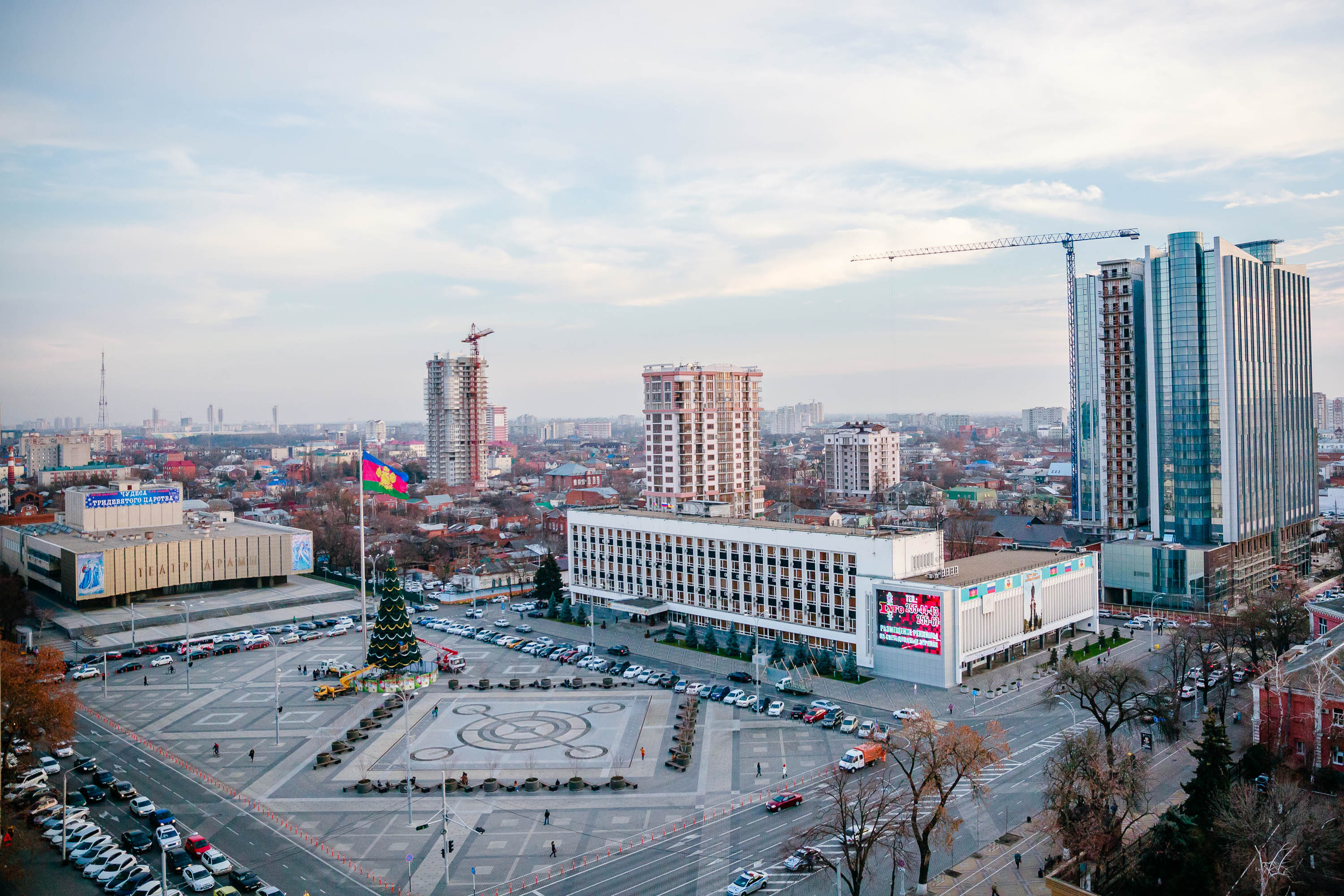
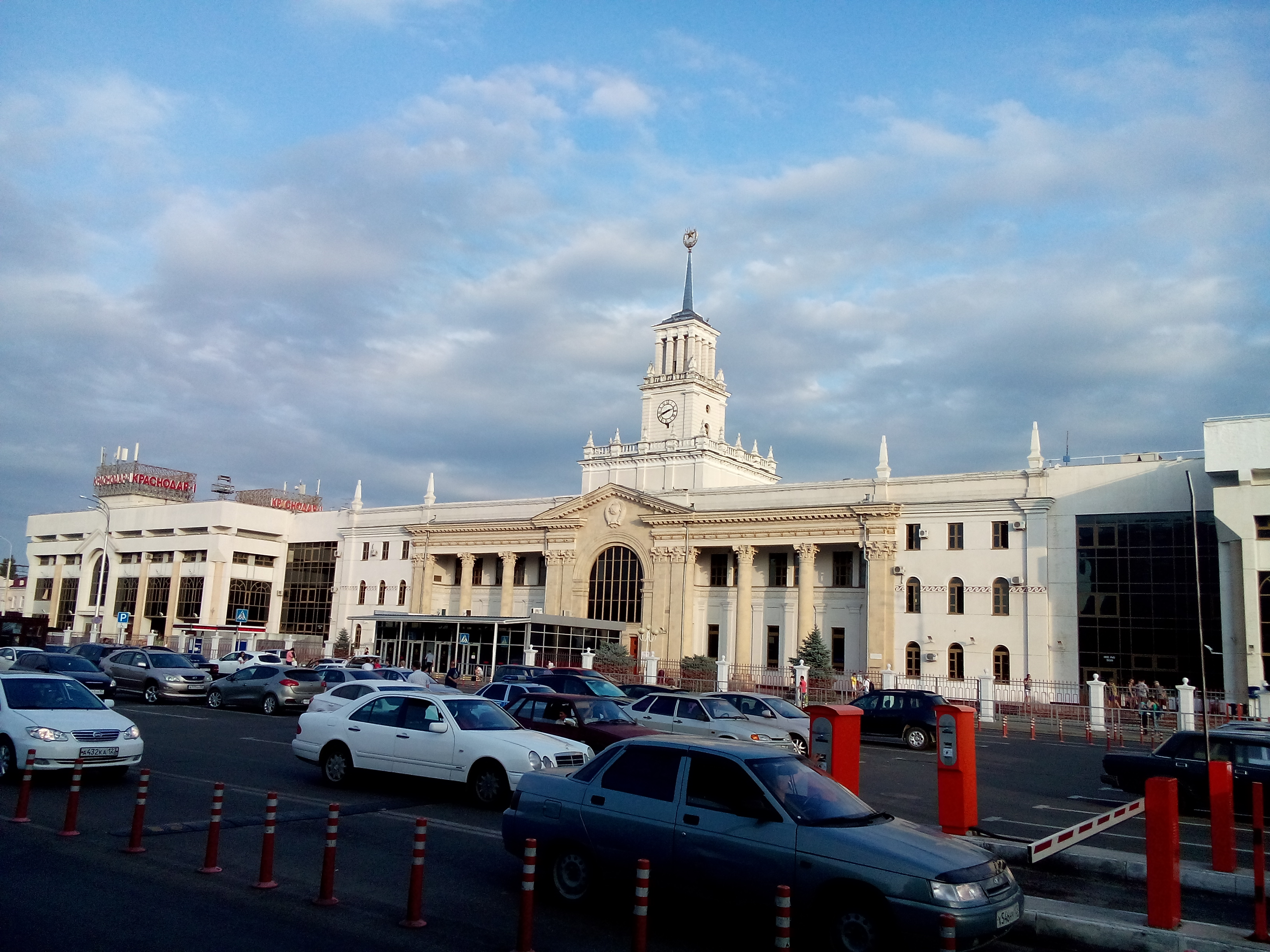
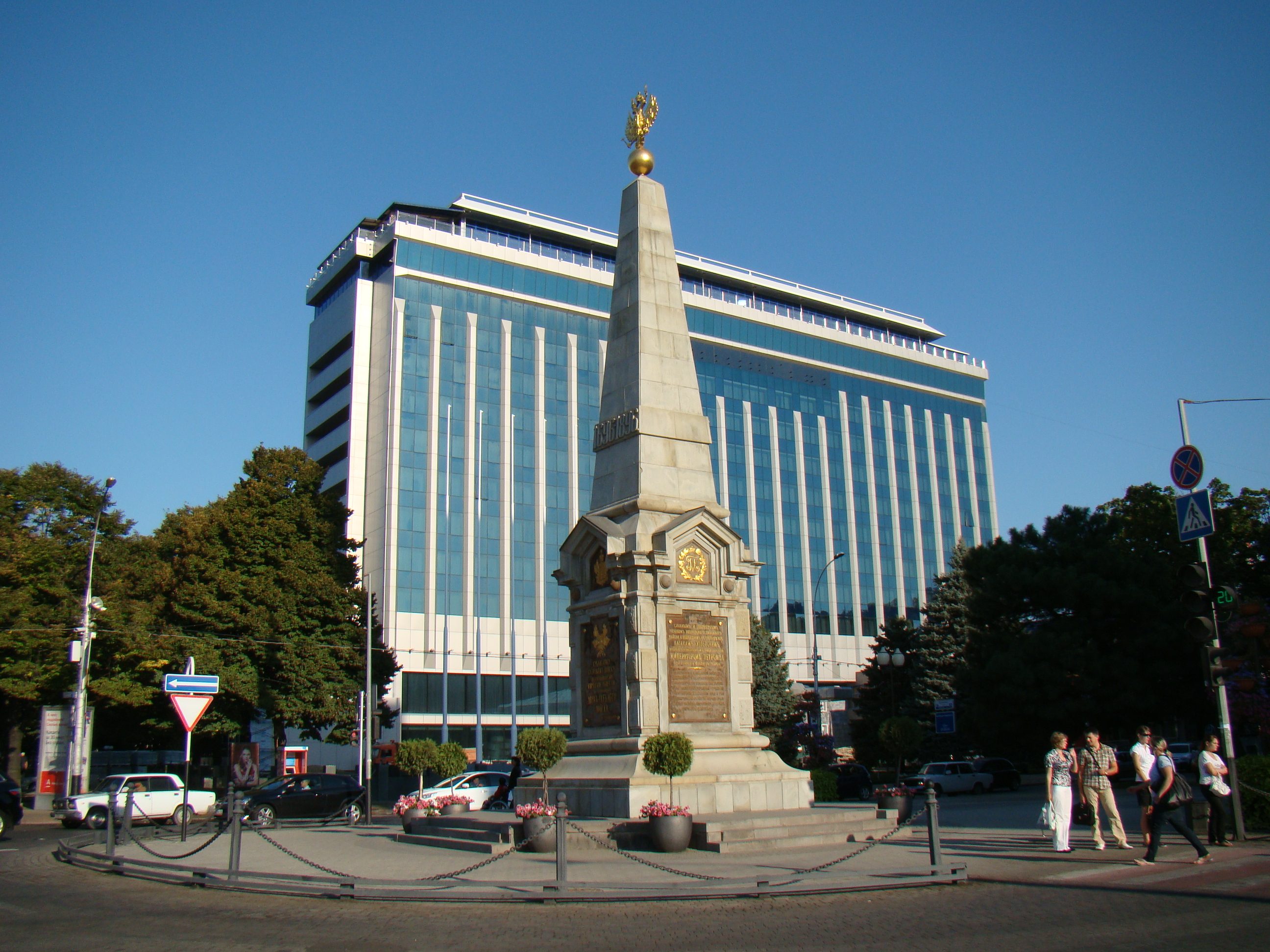
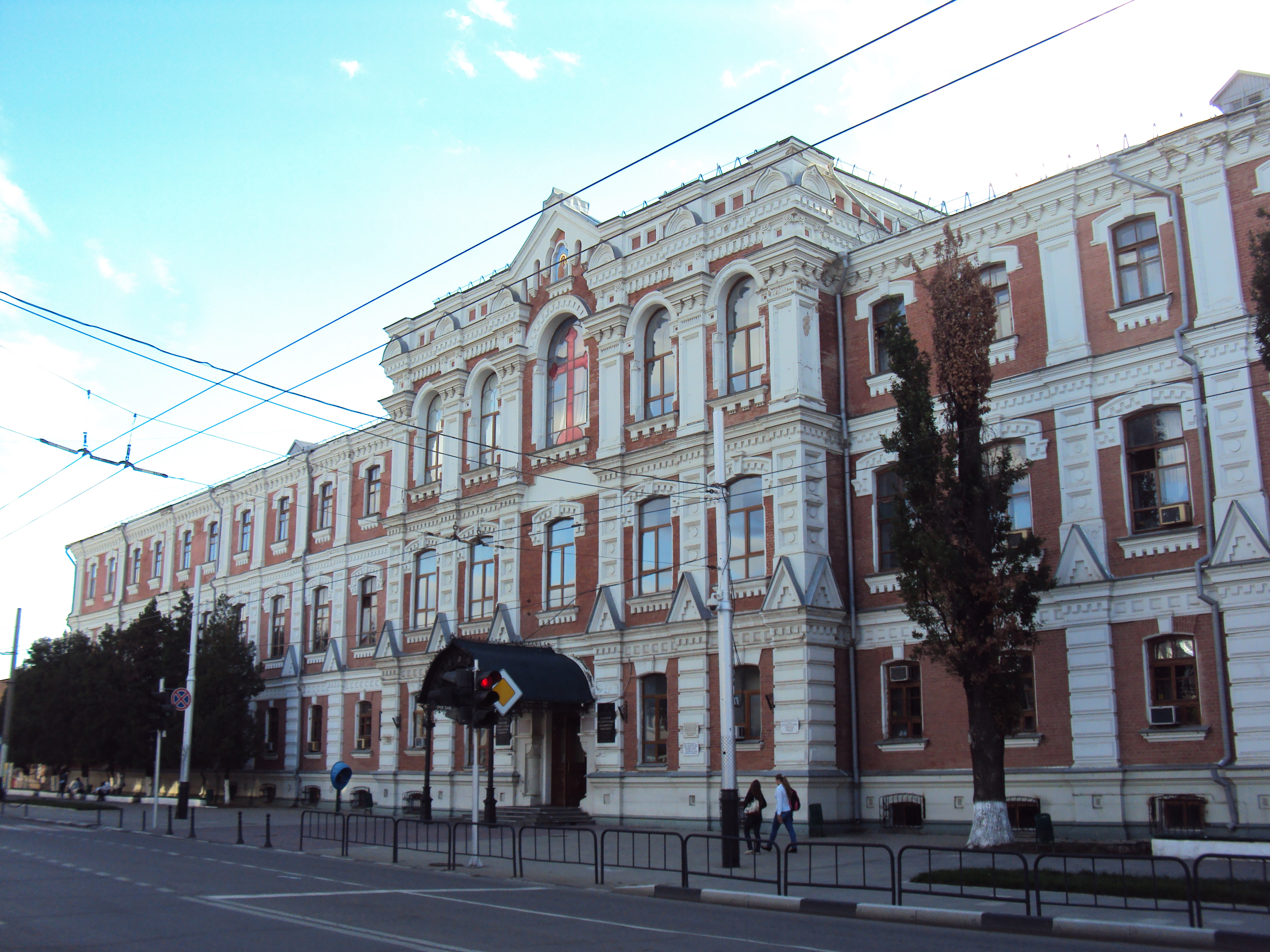
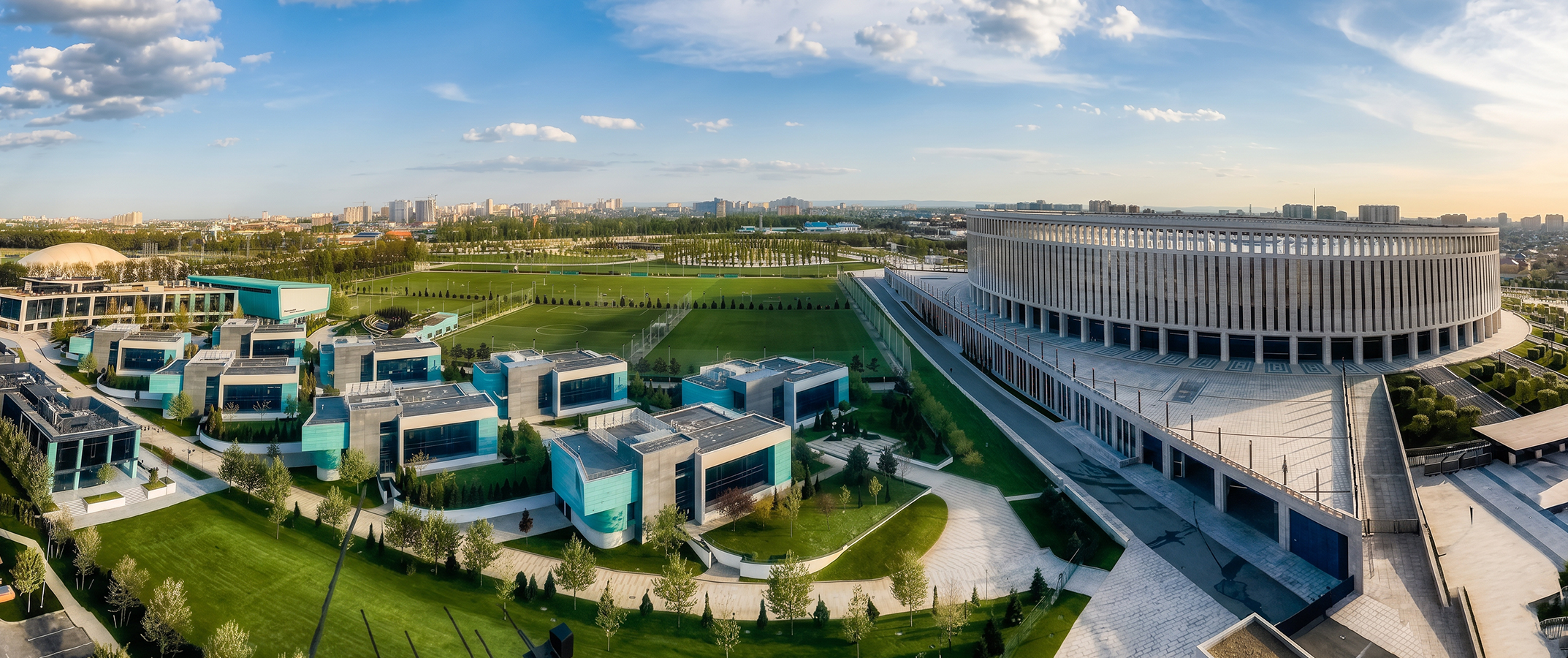
- Theatre's Square Krasnodar-1 railway station Obelisk Alexander Nevskiy Cathedral Medical Academy Krasnodar Park

- Flag Coat of arms
- Anthem: Anthem of Krasnodar
- Interactive map of Krasnodar
- Location in Krasnodar Krai Location in Russia Location in Europe Location in the Black Sea
- Coordinates: 45°02′N 38°58′E
- Country: Russia
- Federal subject: Krasnodar Krai
- Founded: 1793
- City status since: 1867

Government
  - Body: City Duma
  - Mayor: Dmitry Vasilyev (acting)

Area
  - Total: 339.31 km^{2} (131.01 sq mi)
- Elevation: 25 m (82 ft)

Population (2021 Census)
  - Total: 1,099,344
  - Estimate (2025): 1,154,885 (+5.1%)
  - Rank: 13th in 2021
  - Density: 3,239.9/km^{2} (8,391.4/sq mi)

Administrative status
  - Subordinated to: City of Krasnodar
  - Capital of: Krasnodar Krai, City of Krasnodar

Municipal status
  - Urban okrug: Krasnodar Urban Okrug
  - Capital of: Krasnodar Urban Okrug
- Time zone: UTC+3 (MSK)
- Postal codes: List 350000–350005, 350007, 350010–350012, 350014–350016, 350018–350020, 350033, 350035, 350038–350040, 350042, 350044, 350047, 350049, 350051, 350058, 350059, 350061–350067, 350072, 350075, 350078, 350080, 350086–350090, 350500, 350880, 350890, 350899–350901, 350910–350912, 350931, 350960, 350961, 350963–350965, 350991–350999
- Dialing code: +7 861
- OKTMO ID: 03701000001
- City Day: Last non-working day of September
- Website: www.krd.ru

Krasnodar, (Note: /ˌkrɑːsnəˈdɑːr, -noʊ-/; Russian: Краснода́р, IPA: [krəsnɐˈdar].) formerly Yekaterinodar (until 1920), is the largest city and the administrative centre of Krasnodar Krai, Russia. The city stands on the Kuban River in southern Russia, with a population of 1,154,885 residents, and up to 1.263 million residents in the Urban Okrug. In the past decade Krasnodar has experienced rapid population growth, rising to become the tenth-largest city in Russia, and the largest city in southern Russia, as well as the Southern Federal District.

The city originated in 1793 as a fortress built by the Cossacks, and became a trading center for southern Russia. The city sustained heavy damage in World War II but was rebuilt and renovated after the war. Krasnodar is a major economic hub in southern Russia; In 2012, Forbes named Krasnodar the best city for business in Russia. Krasnodar is home to numerous sights, including the Krasnodar Stadium. Its main airport is Krasnodar International Airport.

== Name ==
Krasnodar was founded in 1793 as Yekaterinodar (Екатеринода́р). The original name meant "Catherine's Gift", recognizing both Catherine the Great's grant of land in the Kuban region to the Black Sea Cossacks (created from former Zaporozhian Cossacks) and Saint Catherine of Alexandria, who is considered to be the patron of the city. City status was granted in 1867.

On December 7, 1920, as a result of the October Revolution, Yekaterinodar was renamed Krasnodar (Gift of the Reds). The new name consists of Krasno- (Красно- – 'red', i.e. Communist, but also archaic/poetic form of 'beautiful'); and dar (дар – 'gift').

== History ==
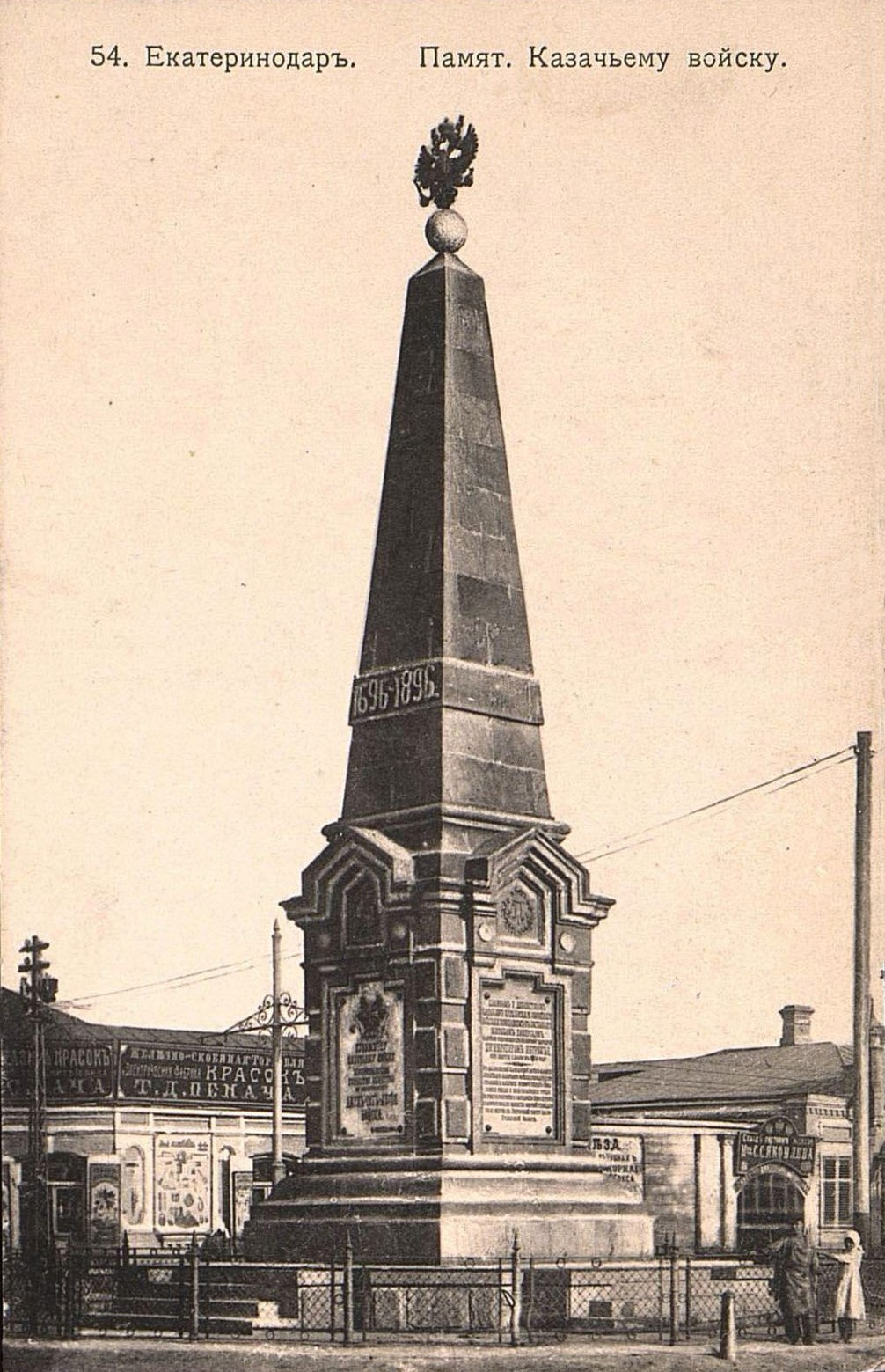
A 19th-century photograph of the Kuban Cossacks Obelisk in Yekaterinodar

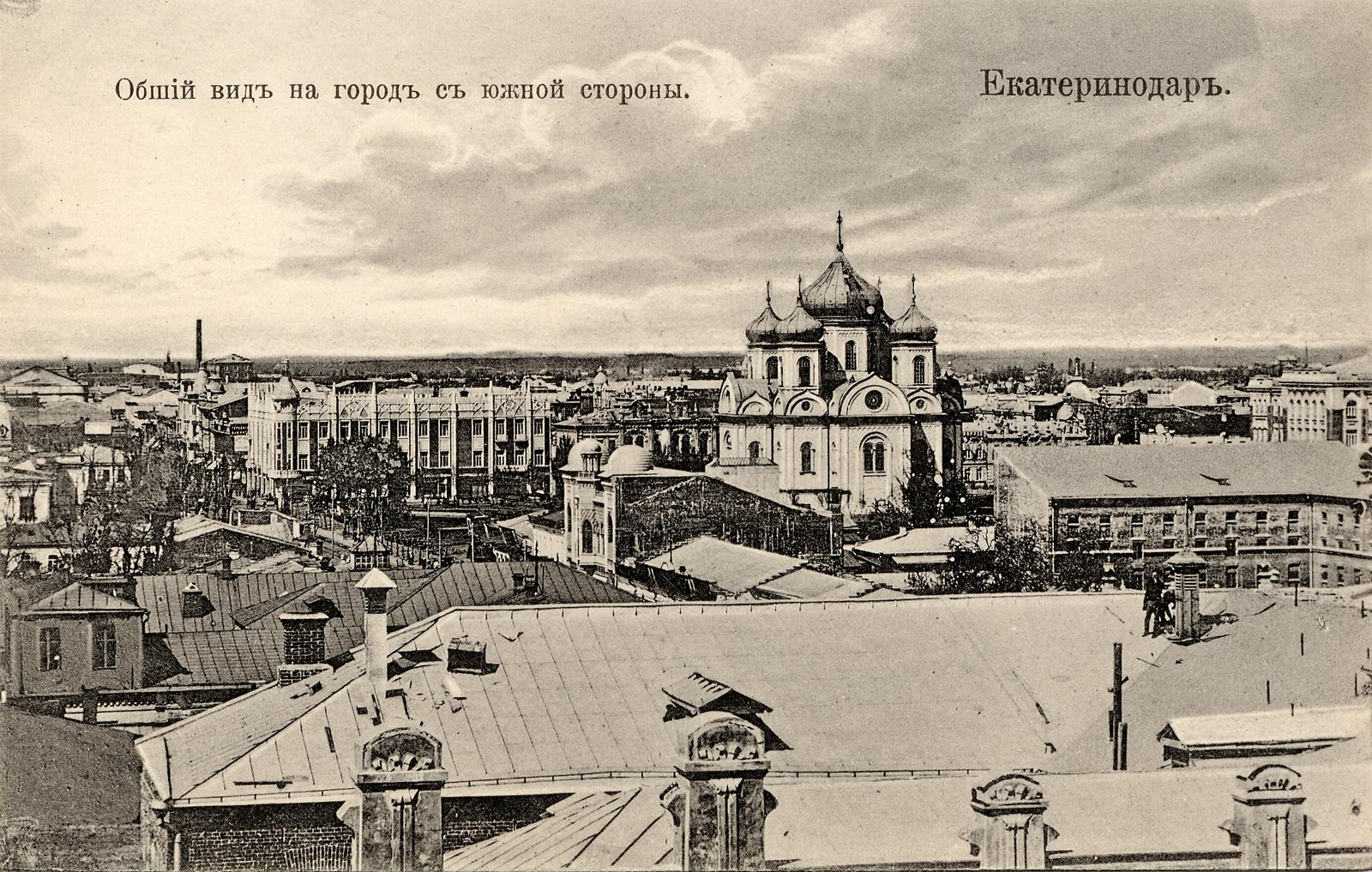
Yekaterinodar in the early 20th century

The city originated in 1793 as a military camp, then as a fortress built by the Black Sea Cossacks to defend imperial borders and to assert Russian dominion over Circassia, a claim which Ottoman Turkey contested. In the first half of the 19th century, Yekaterinodar grew into a busy center of the Kuban Cossacks, gaining official town status in 1867. By 1888, about 45,000 people lived in the city, which had become a vital trade center for southern Russia. In 1897 an obelisk commemorating the two-hundred-year history of the Kuban Cossacks (seen as founded in 1696) was erected in Yekaterinodar. The city was the administrative center of the Yekaterinodarsky Otdel of the Kuban Oblast.

During the Russian Civil War (1917–1922) the city changed hands several times, coming successively under the control of the Red Army and of the Volunteer Army. Many Kuban Cossacks, as committed anti-Bolsheviks, supported the White Movement. Lavr Kornilov, a White general, besieged the city on April 10, 1918, only to be killed a week later when a Bolshevik artillery shell blew up the farmhouse where he had set up his headquarters. During the Soviet famine of 1932–1933 Krasnodar lost over 14% of its population.

During World War II, units of the German Army occupied Krasnodar between August 9, 1942, and February 12, 1943 as part of Operation Edelweiss. The city sustained heavy damage in the fighting but was rebuilt and renovated after the war. German forces, including Gestapo and mobile SS execution squads, killed thousands of Jews, Communists, and suspected Communist partisans. Shooting, hanging, burning, and even gas vans were used.

In the summer of 1943, the Soviets began trials, including of their own citizens, for collusion with the Nazis and for participation in war crimes. The first such trial took place at Krasnodar from July 14 to 17, 1943. The Krasnodar tribunal pronounced eight death sentences, which were summarily carried out in the city square in front of a crowd of about thirty thousand people.

On June 14, 1971, a bombing occurred on a bus in the city, when a homemade suitcase bomb placed near the gas tank by a mentally ill Peter Volynsky exploded. The bomb killed 10 persons and wounded 20–90 others.

== Geography ==
Krasnodar is the largest city and capital of Krasnodar Krai by population and the second-largest by area. It is the 17th-largest city in Russia as of 2010 and the 13th-largest city in Russia as of 2021. It is located on the right bank of the Kuban River. It is 1300 km south of the Russian capital, Moscow. The Black Sea lies 120 km to the west.

=== Climate ===
Under the Köppen climate classification, Krasnodar has a humid subtropical climate (Cfa), bordering closely on a hot-summer humid continental climate, very similar to that of New York City.

Winters are chilly and damp (though mild by Russian standards), with unstable snow cover. The average temperature in January, the area's coldest month, is 1 °C (34 °F). Weather conditions in winter vary greatly in the city; temperatures can exceed 20 °C (68 °F) for a few days, but temperatures below −20 °C (−4 °F) are not uncommon for Krasnodar as the city is not protected by mountains from cold waves. Summers are typically hot, with a July average of 24.1 °C (75.4 °F).

The city receives 735 millimeters (28.9 in) of precipitation annually, fairly spread throughout the year. Extreme storms are rare in the Krasnodar area. Extreme temperatures have ranged from −32.9 to 40.7 °C (−27.2 to 105.3 °F), recorded on January 11, 1940 and July 30, 2000, respectively.

Climate data for Krasnodar (1991–2020, extremes 1881–present)
Month	Jan	Feb	Mar	Apr	May	Jun	Jul	Aug	Sep	Oct	Nov	Dec	Year
Record high °C (°F)	20.8 (69.4)	23.1 (73.6)	29.9 (85.8)	34.7 (94.5)	35.1 (95.2)	39.3 (102.7)	40.7 (105.3)	40.0 (104.0)	38.5 (101.3)	33.9 (93.0)	28.5 (83.3)	23.0 (73.4)	40.7 (105.3)
Mean daily maximum °C (°F)	4.5 (40.1)	6.7 (44.1)	11.8 (53.2)	18.6 (65.5)	23.9 (75.0)	28.2 (82.8)	31.1 (88.0)	31.4 (88.5)	25.6 (78.1)	19.0 (66.2)	11.2 (52.2)	6.4 (43.5)	18.2 (64.8)
Daily mean °C (°F)	0.8 (33.4)	1.9 (35.4)	6.5 (43.7)	12.4 (54.3)	17.9 (64.2)	22.2 (72.0)	24.9 (76.8)	24.7 (76.5)	19.2 (66.6)	12.9 (55.2)	6.3 (43.3)	2.4 (36.3)	12.7 (54.9)
Mean daily minimum °C (°F)	−1.9 (28.6)	−1.5 (29.3)	2.7 (36.9)	7.4 (45.3)	12.9 (55.2)	17.0 (62.6)	19.4 (66.9)	18.9 (66.0)	13.8 (56.8)	8.4 (47.1)	2.9 (37.2)	−0.4 (31.3)	8.3 (46.9)
Record low °C (°F)	−32.9 (−27.2)	−29.8 (−21.6)	−25.5 (−13.9)	−5.6 (21.9)	−1.2 (29.8)	4.2 (39.6)	9.5 (49.1)	3.9 (39.0)	−2.2 (28.0)	−9.9 (14.2)	−20.4 (−4.7)	−27.6 (−17.7)	−32.9 (−27.2)
Average precipitation mm (inches)	65 (2.6)	53 (2.1)	65 (2.6)	49 (1.9)	65 (2.6)	80 (3.1)	66 (2.6)	41 (1.6)	51 (2.0)	61 (2.4)	66 (2.6)	69 (2.7)	731 (28.8)
Average extreme snow depth cm (inches)	3 (1.2)	4 (1.6)	1 (0.4)	0 (0)	0 (0)	0 (0)	0 (0)	0 (0)	0 (0)	0 (0)	1 (0.4)	2 (0.8)	4 (1.6)
Average rainy days	13	11	14	15	14	14	10	8	10	12	14	15	150
Average snowy days	11	10	6	0.3	0	0	0	0	0	0	3	9	39
Average relative humidity (%)	81	76	72	66	66	68	63	62	68	75	81	82	72
Mean monthly sunshine hours	71	84	136	181	247	277	303	286	238	173	88	55	2,139
Source 1: Погода и Климат
Source 2: NOAA (sun, 1961–1990)

== Demographics ==
Historical population
Year	Pop.	±%
1897	65,606	—
1926	158,460	+141.5%
1939	203,806	+28.6%
1959	313,110	+53.6%
1970	464,147	+48.2%
1979	560,438	+20.7%
1989	620,516	+10.7%
2002	646,175	+4.1%
2010	744,995	+15.3%
2021	1,099,344	+47.6%
2025	1,154,885	+5.1%
Sources: Census data, estimate

Due to internal migration, Krasnodar is one of the fastest growing cities in Russia. In the 2021 census, one million people were counted within the city limits for the first time in the city's history.

Per the 1897 imperial census, Krasnodar—then known as Yekaterinodar—had a population of 65,606. Of them, 34,684 (52.9%) spoke "Great Russian" (Russian), 25,112 (38.3%) "Little Russian" (Ukrainian), and 1,834 (2.8%) Armenian. In 1916, Yekaterinodar had a population of 103,624, composed of 88,508 Russians (85.4%, including Little Russians), 5,963 Europeans (5.8%), 5,900 Armenians (5.7%), and other nationalities.

Per the 1926 Soviet census, Krasnodar's population consisted of 82,818 Russians (51.17%), 48,511 Ukrainians (29.97%), 12,463 Armenians (7.70%), 2,948 Belarusians (1.82%), 1,746 Jews (1.08%), 1,316 Poles (0.81%), 1,105 Germans (0.68%) and 1,007 Greeks (0.62%), while 9,929 people (6.14%) belonged to other various minorities. The 1939 census saw a sharp decrease of people identified as Ukrainians. Of 203,806 people living in Krasnodar, 177,579 were listed as Russians and only 8,253 as Ukrainians. The amount of Armenians also decreased to 7,867.

As of 2021, the ethnic composition of Krasnodar was:

Ethnicity	Population	Percentage
Russians	954,454	94.4%
Armenians	20,652	2.0%
Circassians	5,111	0.5%
Tatars	2,540	0.3%
Others	27,878	2.8%

== Economy ==
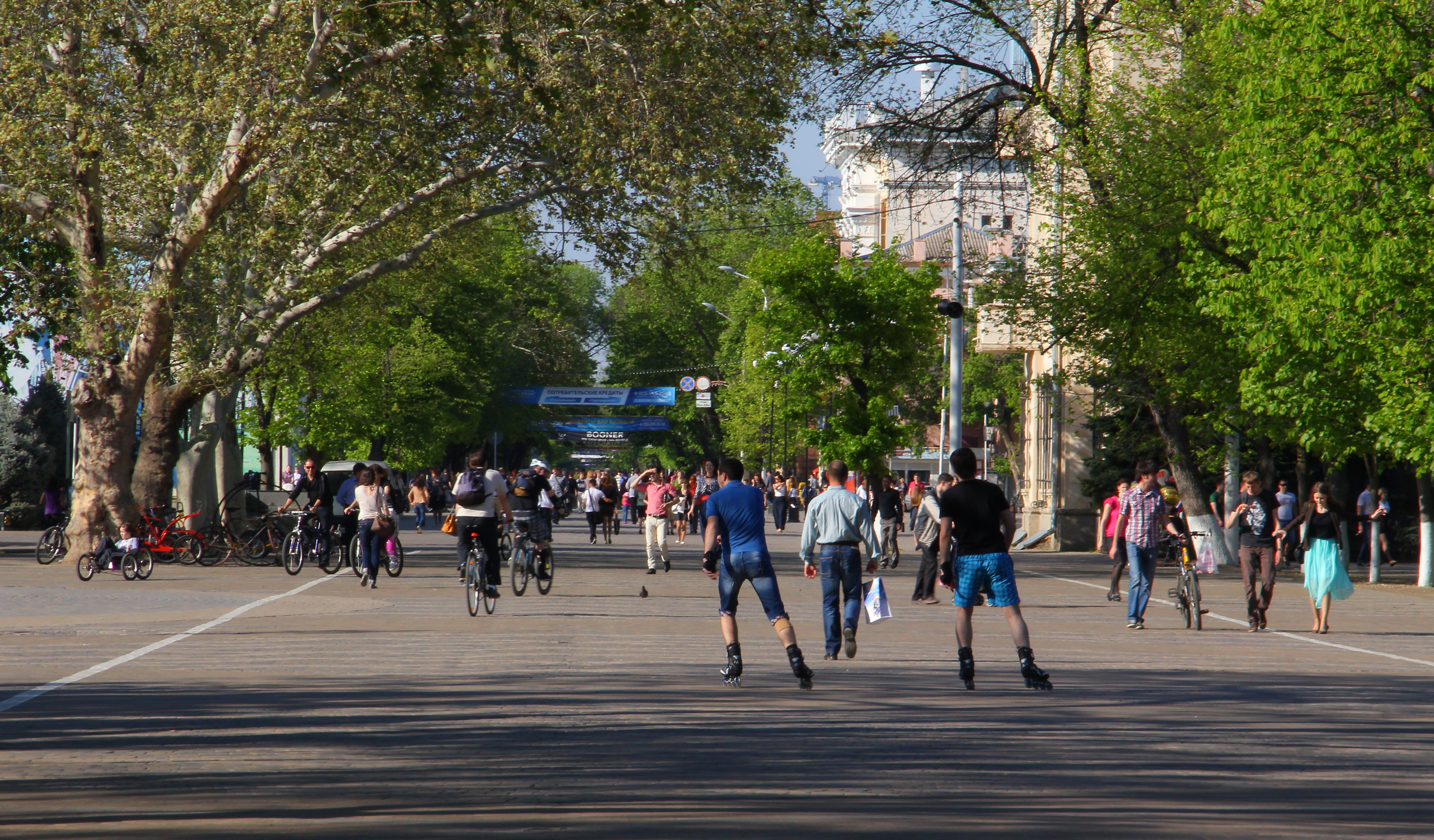
Zapadnyy okrug in Krasnodar

Krasnodar is the economic center of southern Russia. For several years, Forbes magazine named Krasnodar the best city for business in Russia. The industrial sector of the city has more than 130 large and medium-sized enterprises.

The main industries of Krasnodar:

- Agriculture and food industry: 42.8%
- Energy sector: 13.4%
- Fuel industry: 10.5%
- Machine construction: 9.4%
- Forestry and chemical industries: about 4%

Krasnodar is a highly developed commercial area, and has the largest annual turnover in the Southern Federal District of Russia. Retail trade turnover in 2010 reached 290 billion rubles. Per capita, Krasnodar has the highest number of malls in Russia. Note that in the crisis year 2009 turnover of Krasnodar continued to grow, while most of the cities showed a negative trend in the sale of goods.

Krasnodar has the lowest unemployment rate among the cities of the Southern Federal District at 0.3% of the total working-age population. In addition, Krasnodar holds the first place in terms of highest average salary – 21,742 rubles per capita.

Tourism comprises a large part of Krasnodar's economy. There are more than 80 hotels in Krasnodar. The Hilton Garden Inn, opened in 2013, is the first world-class hotel in the city.

== Administrative and municipal status ==
Krasnodar is the administrative center of the krai. Within the framework of administrative divisions, it is, together with twenty-nine rural localities, incorporated as the City of Krasnodar—an administrative unit with the status equal to that of the districts. As a municipal division, the City of Krasnodar is incorporated as Krasnodar Urban Okrug.

== Culture ==
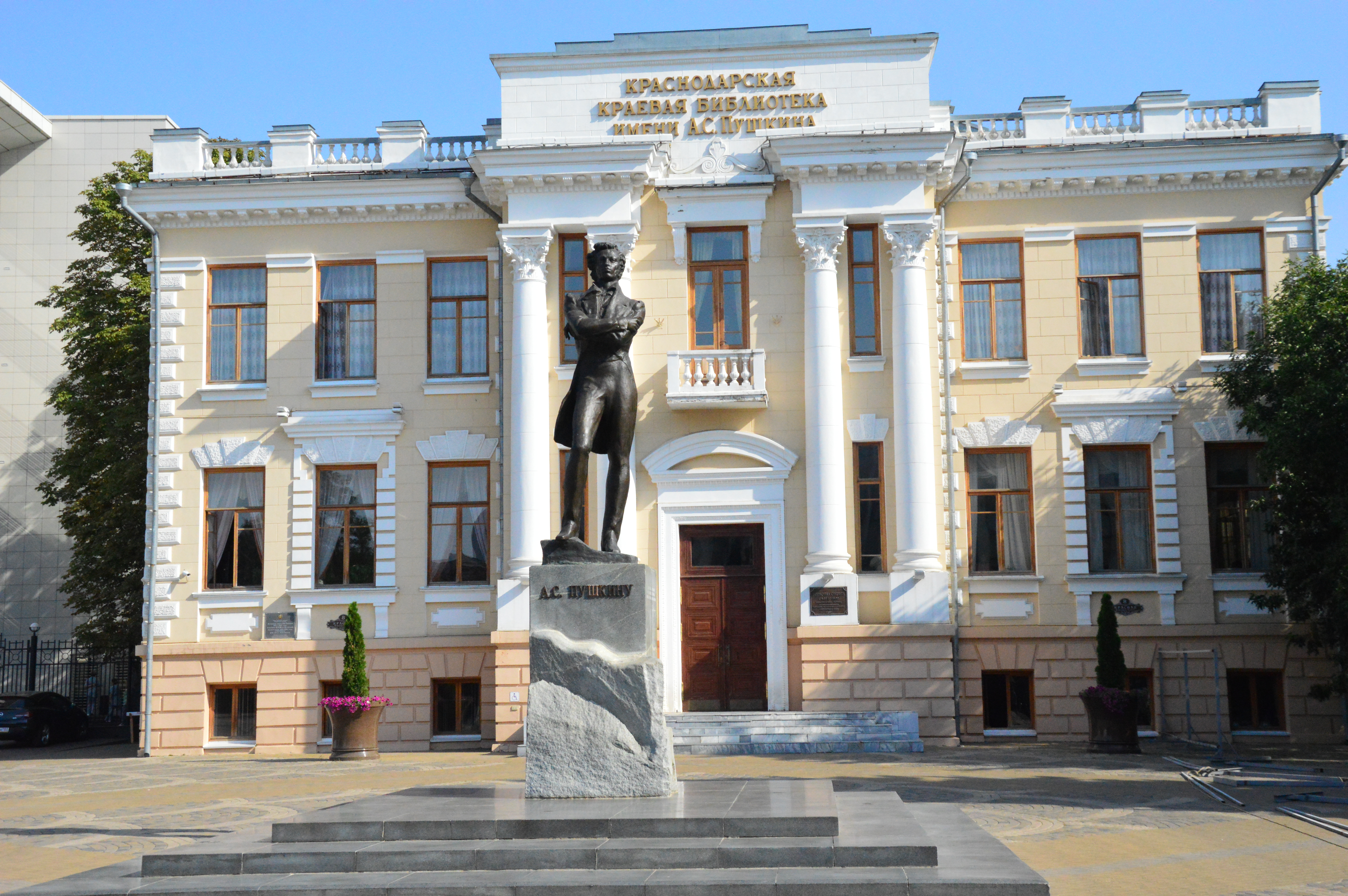
Pushkin Library

The oldest part of the city is Krasnodar Historic Center, which consists of many historic buildings, several from the 19th century. Buildings have been preserved, restored or reconstructed, and the district is now a substantial tourist attraction.

There are several major theater venues in Krasnodar:

- The Gorky Krasnodar State Academic Drama Theater
- The Krasnodar Ballet Theater
- The Krasnodar State Academic Drama Theater
- The Krasnodar Regional Puppet Theater
- The Krasnodar Musical Theater
- The Children's Ballet Theater "Fugitives"
- The Krasnodar State Circus
- The Krasnodar Youth Theater
- The Ponomarenko Krasnodar Philharmonic
- The Kuban Cossack Choir
- The Creative Association "Premiere"
- The New Puppet Theater

Krasnodar has several major museums. The Kovalenko Krasnodar Regional Art Museum, the oldest public art museum in the North Caucasus, is one of the finest.

The largest public library of the city is the Pushkin Krasnodar Regional Universal Scientific Library, founded in 1900.

== Main sights ==
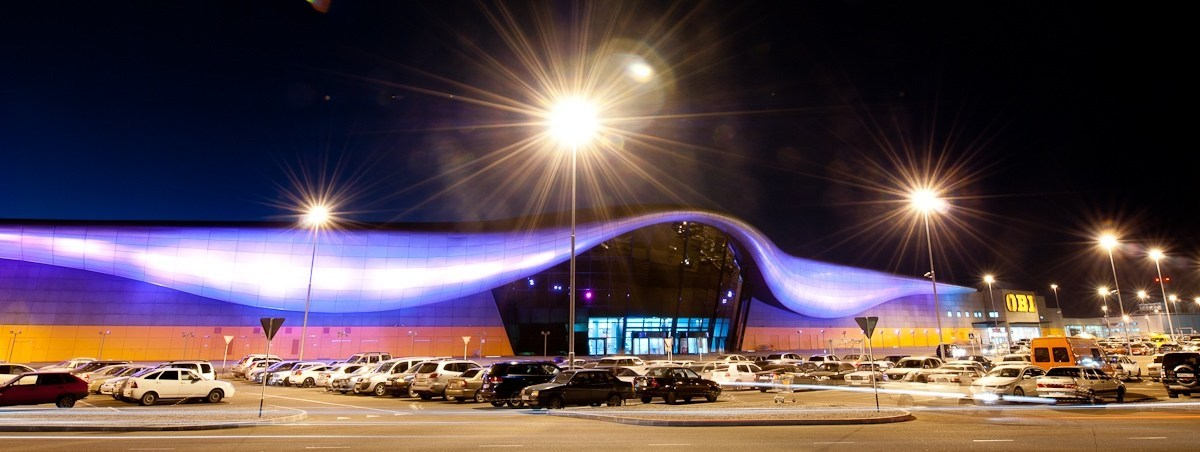
Oz Mall, the largest mall in southern Russia

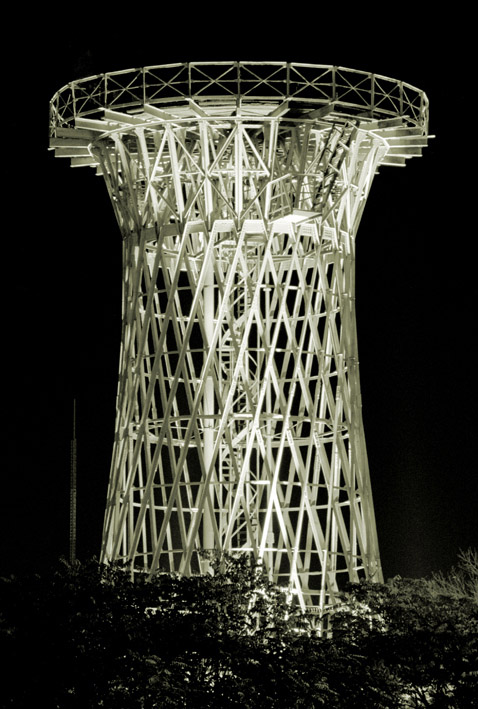
Shukhov's Hyperboloid Tower near Krasnodar's Circus

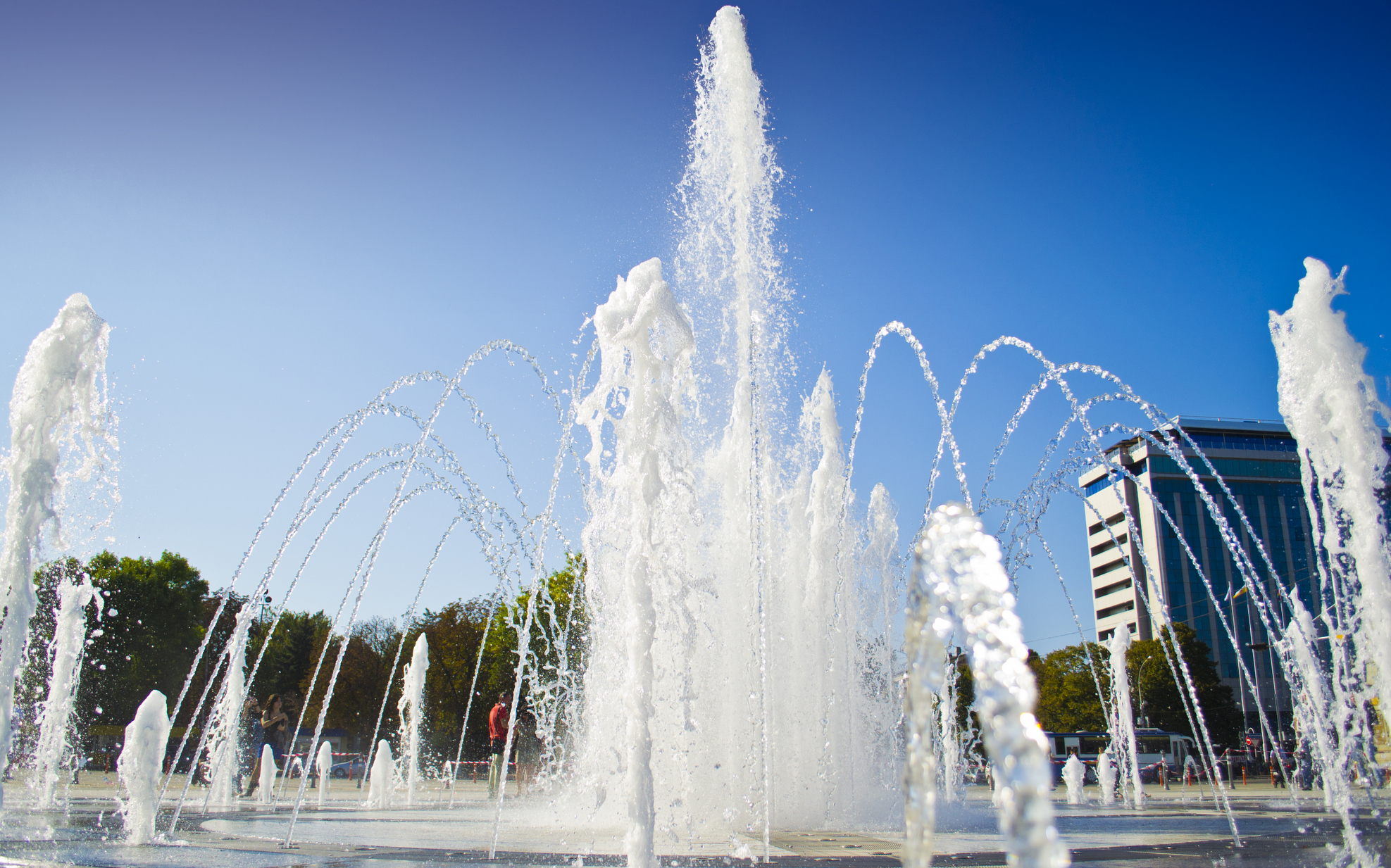
The Splash Fountain in Krasnodar

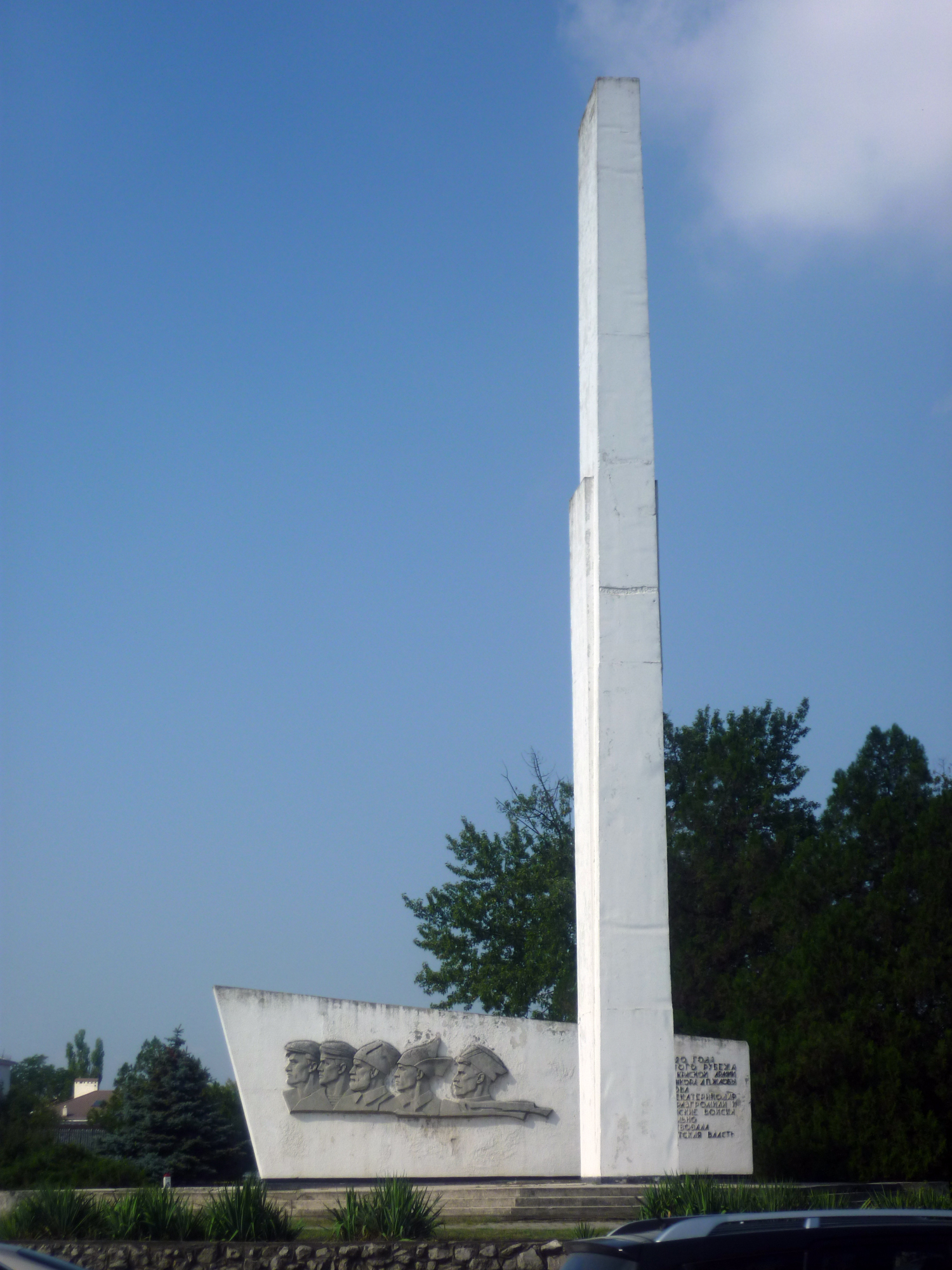
Obelisk to Red Army soldiers

Krasnodar is home to the steel lattice hyperboloid tower built by the Russian engineer and scientist Vladimir Grigorievich Shukhov in 1928; it is located near Krasnodar Circus.

Other attractions include St. Catherine's Cathedral, the State Arts Museum, a park and theater named after Maxim Gorky, the beautiful concert hall of the Krasnodar Philharmonic Society, which is considered to have some of the best acoustics in southern Russia, State Cossack Choir and the Krasnodar circus

The central street of Krasnodar is Krasnaya Street (which translates as "Red" or "Beautiful Street"). Many of the city's sights are located there. At the beginning of the street, one can see the Central Concert Hall; at the other end, one can see the Avrora cinema center. A "Triumphal Arch" is situated in the middle of Krasnaya Street.

Theater Square is home to the largest splash fountain in Europe. This fountain was officially inaugurated on September 25, 2011 along with an official ceremony to celebrate the City Day in Krasnodar.

The best-known park of the city is the Krasnodar park (popularly known as Galitsky Park), a regular park located in the northeast of the downtown Krasnodar in the Shkolny microdistrict, between Vostochno-Kruglikovskaya and Hero Vladislav Posadsky streets, next to the FC Krasnodar stadium. The park was built at the expense of entrepreneur Sergey Galitsky and opened on September 28, 2017. The area is 22.7 hectares. More than 2.5 thousand trees are planted in the park: oak, hornbeam, alder, bonsai, poplar, pine, tulip tree, maple, thuja, decorative plum.

== Sports ==
In amateur sport shinty in Russia has its centre in Krasnodar. Several professional sports clubs are active in the city:

Club	Sport	Founded	Current league	League Level	Stadium
Kuban Krasnodar (defunct)	Football	1928	—		
FC Krasnodar	Football	2008	Premier League	1st	Krasnodar Stadium
WFC Krasnodar	Football	2020	Women's Supreme Division	1st	Krasnodar Academy Stadium
Kubanochka Krasnodar (defunct)	Football	1988	—		
Urozhay Krasnodar	Football	2018	PFL	3rd	Kuban Stadium
Lokomotiv Kuban	Basketball	2009	VTB United League	1st	Basket Hall
Kuban Krasnodar	Rugby union	1996	Professional Rugby League	1st	Trud Stadium
Kuban Krasnodar (defunct)	Ice hockey	2012	—		
Dinamo Krasnodar	Volleyball	1994	Volleyball Super League	3rd	Olimp Sports Palace
Dinamo Krasnodar	Volleyball	1946	Women's Volleyball Super League	1st	Olimp Sports Palace
SKIF Krasnodar	Handball	1963	Handball Super League	1st	Olimp Sports Palace
Kuban Krasnodar	Handball	1965	Women's Handball Super League	1st	Olimp Sports Palace
Krasnodar Bisons	American football	2006	League of American football	1st	UTB Kuban

== Transportation ==
As in many other major cities in Russia, the primary mode of local transportation in Krasnodar is the automobile, though efforts have been made to increase the availability of alternative modes of transportation, including the construction of light railways (projected), biking paths, and wide sidewalks. Public transportation within Krasnodar consists of city buses, trolleybuses, trams, and marshrutkas (routed taxis). Trolleybuses and trams, both powered by overhead electric wires, are the main form of public transportation in Krasnodar, which does not have a metro system.

The main airline was Kuban Airlines (at Krasnodar International Airport), but it closed down in 2012 and now the main ones are Aeroflot and Rossiya Airlines. The largest hotels in the city include the Intourist, Hotel Moskva, and Hotel Platan. Krasnodar uses a 220 V/50 Hz power supply with two round-pin outlets, like most European countries.

There are also two railway stations in Krasnodar: Krasnodar-1 and Krasnodar-2.

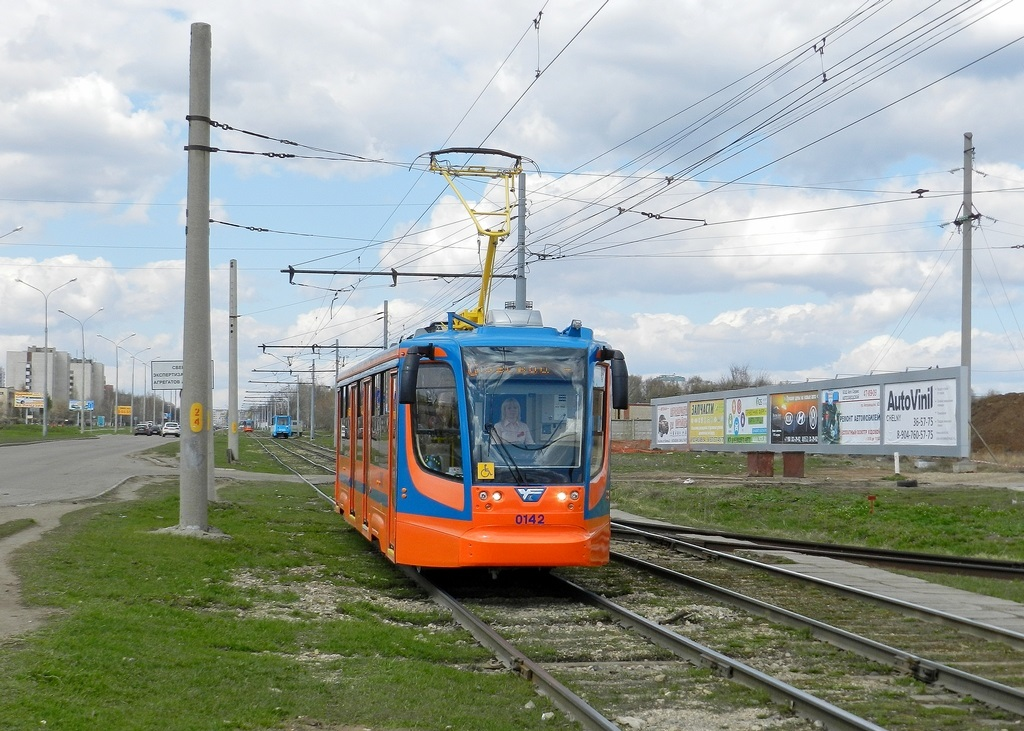
KTM-23 tram

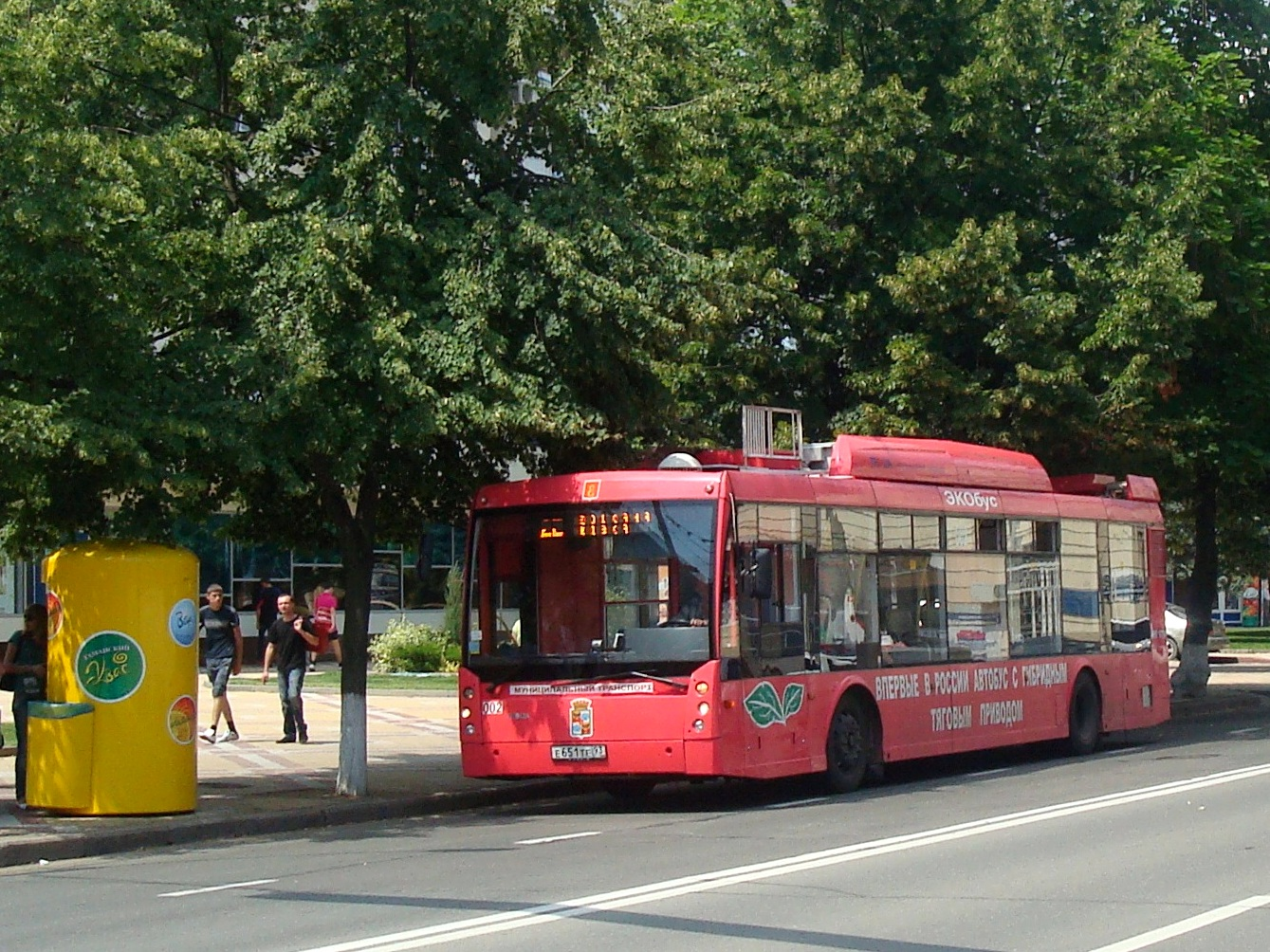
Trolza 5250 Ecobus hybrid bus

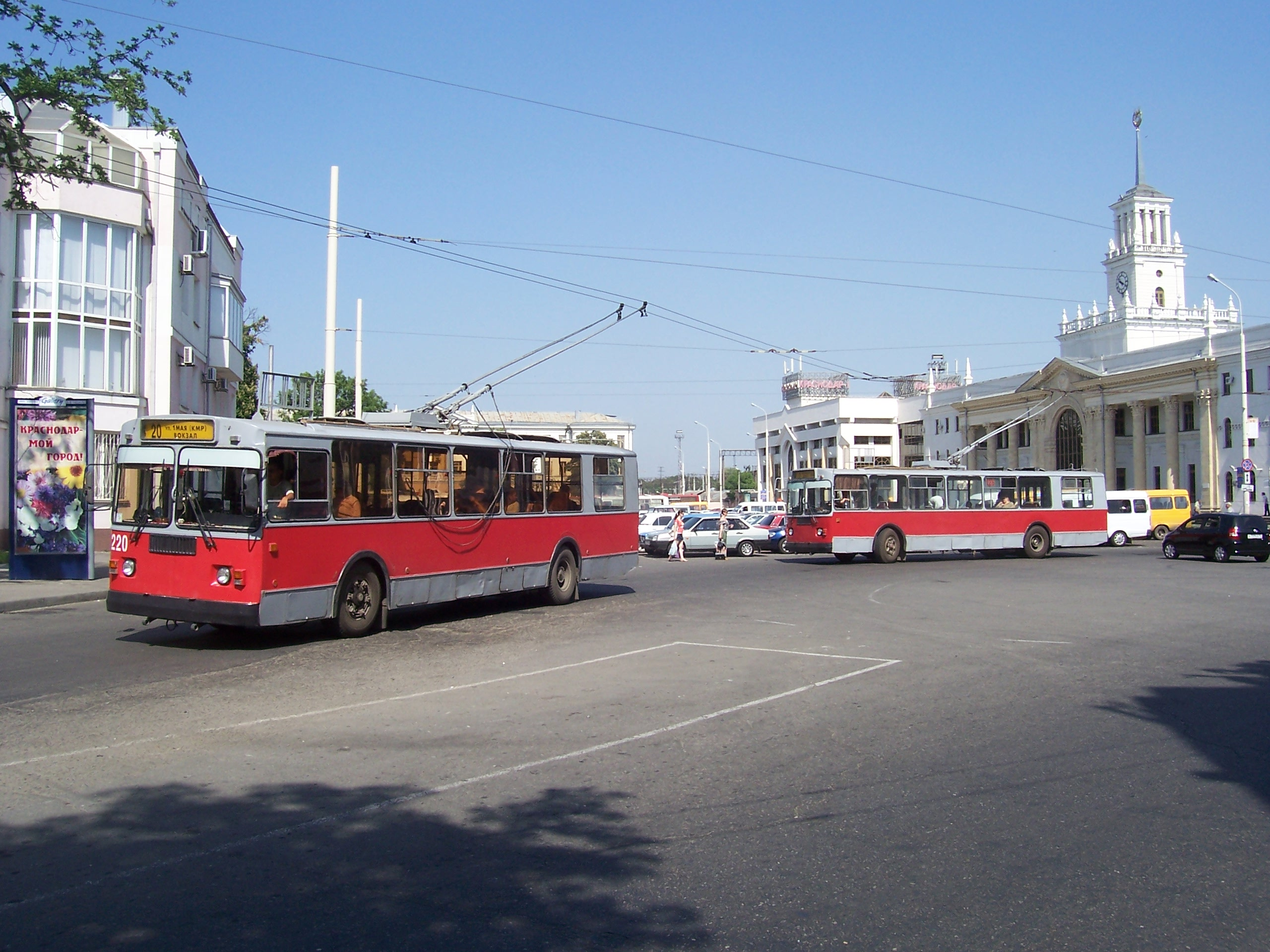
ZiU-682 trolleybuses

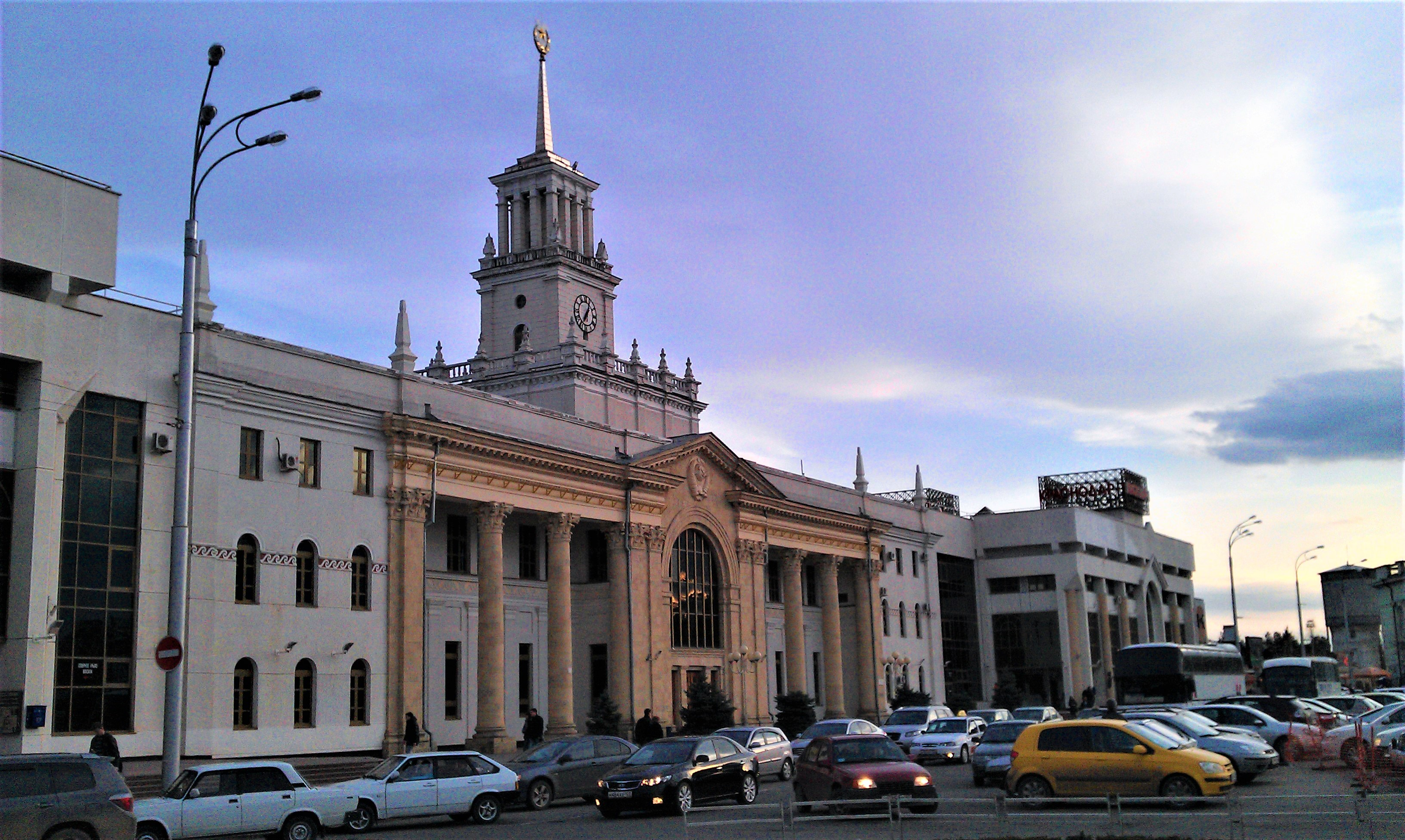
Krasnodar-I railway station

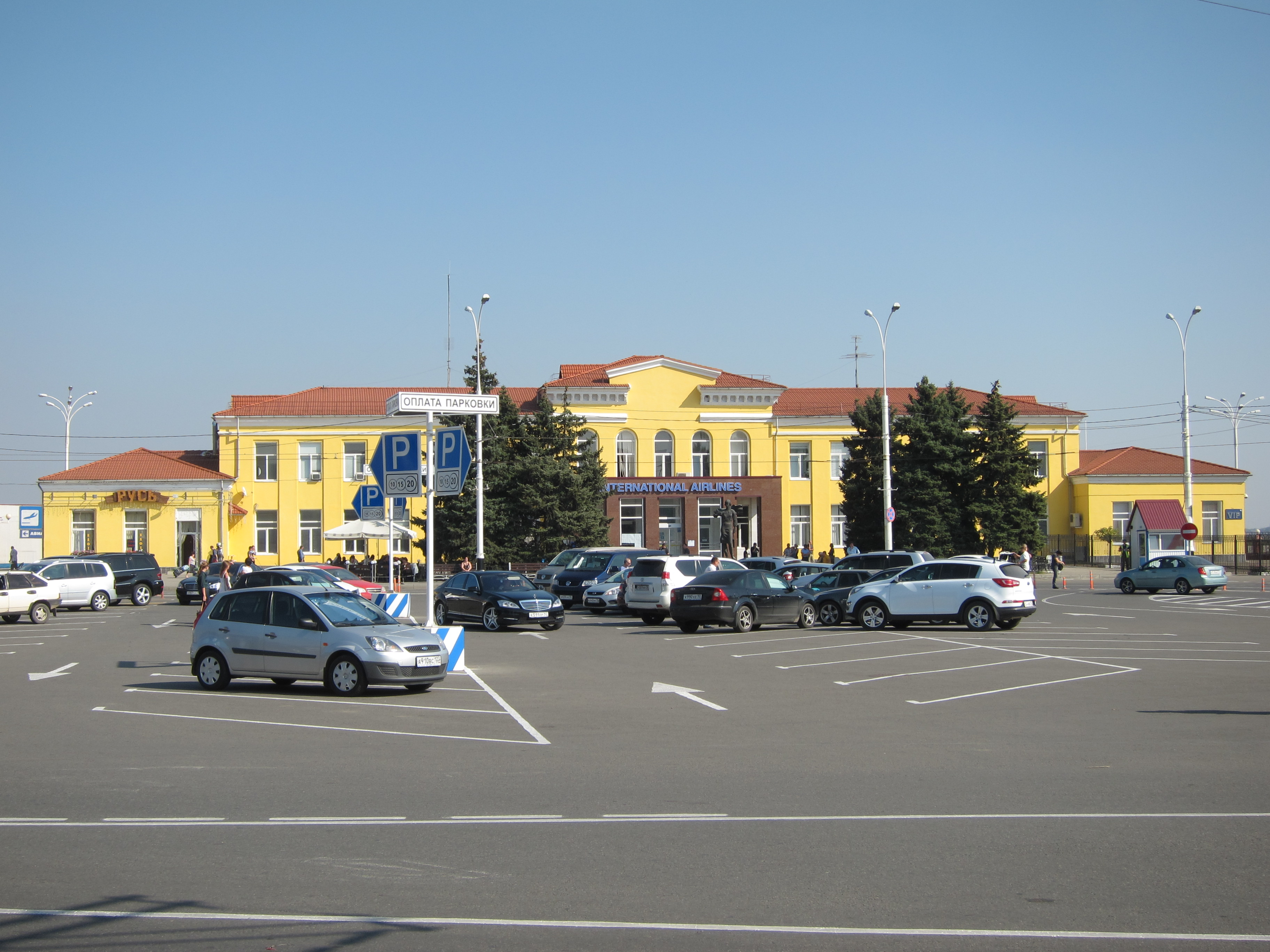
Krasnodar International Airport (Pashkovsky) international passenger terminal

== Education ==
In Krasnodar there are 15 gymnasiums (academic secondary schools) 5 lyceums (colleges of higher education), 110 schools of general education and 20 specialized schools, as well as 7 non-state lyceums and schools.

The city has numerous institutions of higher education, including some state universities (Kuban State University, Kuban State Technological University, Kuban State Agrarian University, Kuban State Medical University, etc.). Other universities include: Marketing and Social Technology University of Krasnodar.

== Coat of arms ==
The coat of arms of Yekaterinodar was introduced in 1841 by the Cossack yesaul Ivan Chernik. The royal letter "E" in the middle is for Ekaterina II (Russian for Catherine II). It also depicts the date the city was founded, the Imperial double headed eagle (symbolizing Tsar's patronage of the Black Sea Cossacks), a bulawa of a Cossack ataman, Yekaterinodar fortress, and flags with letters "E", "P", "A", and "N" standing for Catherine II, Paul I, Alexander I and Nicholas I. Yellow stars around the shield symbolized 59 Black Sea stanitsas around the city.

== International relations ==
=== Twin towns – sister cities ===
Krasnodar is twinned with:

- Burgas, Bulgaria
- Ferrara, Italy
- Harbin, China
- Karlsruhe, Germany
- Nancy, France
- Sukhumi, Abkhazia
- Tallahassee, United States (unrequited since 2022)
- Wels, Austria
- Istočno Sarajevo, Bosnia and Herzegovina

=== Partner cities ===
Krasnodar cooperates with:

- Larnaca, Cyprus
- Novi Sad, Serbia
- Yerevan, Armenia

== See also ==
- Geography of Krasnodar
