= Commissioner of Taxation v La Rosa =

2003 Australian court decision

- Court: Full Court of the Federal Court of Australia
- Full case name: Commissioner of Taxation of the Commonwealth of Australia v Francesco Dominico La Rosa
- Decided: 5 June 2003
- Citation: [2003] FCAFC 125

Case history
- Prior actions: [2002] FCA 1036 [2000] AATA 625
- Appealed from: Federal Court of Australia, Administrative Appeals Tribunal

Court membership
- Judges sitting: Carr, Merkel & Hely JJ

Commissioner of Taxation v La Rosa was a 2003 decision of the Federal Court of Australia, sitting as the Full Court of the Federal Court. The court upheld two earlier rulings that Frank La Rosa, a convicted heroin dealer, was entitled to a tax deduction of $220,000 for money stolen from him during a drug deal. As a result of the decision, the federal government amended the Income Tax Assessment Act 1997 to prevent similar deductions being made.

== Background ==
In 1996, Francesco Dominico "Frank" La Rosa was sentenced to 12 years in prison for importing heroin and possessing heroin and amphetamines with intent to distribute. He also forfeited property to the value of $264,610 under the Proceeds of Crime Act 1987. As a result of La Rosa's convictions, it came to the attention of the Australian Taxation Office (ATO) that he had failed to lodge tax returns for the seven financial years from 1989–90 to 1995–96. The ATO subsequently issued notices of assessment for those years, based on information provided by the Commonwealth Director of Public Prosecutions about La Rosa's activities. His assessed taxable income included both legally and illegally obtained income, as Australian taxation law does not distinguish between the two. His assessed income for the 1994–95 period included a sum of $220,000 cash that had been stolen from him during a botched drug deal. The money "was accumulated from drug dealings and had been buried in the taxpayer's backyard".

== Legal process ==
La Rosa appealed the inclusion of the $220,000 in his assessable income. Appearing pro se, he argued that the money had been provided to him by the Australian Federal Police as part of his role in a sting operation, and was thus not income. The Commissioner of Taxation rejected his argument, which La Rosa raised again on appeal to the Administrative Appeals Tribunal (AAT). The AAT reaffirmed the earlier conclusion that the money should be treated as assessable income, dismissing any notion of police involvement. However, acting "as a matter of procedural fairness as the taxpayer had little tax knowledge and was representing himself", the tribunal concluded that the stolen money met the general deduction provisions in the Income Tax Assessment Act 1936 (ITAA36), and thus could be deducted from La Rosa's taxable income. The ATO appealed to the Federal Court, where in 2002 Judge Robert Nicholson upheld the AAT's ruling. The Federal Court ruling brought the case to the attention of the public, provoking "an immediate public and political storm". The ATO was subsequently granted leave to appeal to the Full Court of the Federal Court.

=== Final ruling ===
The three-member Full Court of the Federal Court upheld the earlier rulings, finding that La Rosa was entitled to deduct the $220,000 in full. The main issue considered by the court was the deductibility of expenses incurred by an illegal business. The leading judgment in the case was given by Justice Peter Hely, who observed:

The purpose of the ITAA is to tax taxable income, not punish wrongdoing. [...] There should not be a higher burden of taxation imposed on those whose business activities are unlawful than that imposed in relation to lawful business activities. Punishment of those who engage in unlawful activities is imposed by the criminal law, and not by the laws in relation to income tax.

The court first considered whether the sum had correctly been included in La Rosa's assessable income. It noted a substantial precedent that "the illegal nature of a receipt does not deny its taxability", as the ITAA made no distinction between income derived from legal and illegal activities. It therefore upheld the AAT's initial ruling that the $220,000 formed part of La Rosa's assessable income. The court observed that exempting illegally obtained revenue from taxation would "favour dishonest businesses over honest ones". The court also ruled that La Rosa's operations, although illegal, nonetheless constituted a "business" within the ITAA definition.

Section 51(1) of the ITAA allowed taxpayers to deduct losses "incurred in gaining or producing the assessable income", with some exceptions. Section 51(2) specifically allowed for the deduction of "expenditure incurred or deemed to have been incurred in the purchase of stock used by the taxpayer as trading stock". (Note: Section 51(1) of the Income Tax Assessment Act 1936 is now defunct and has been replaced by section 8-1 of the Income Tax Assessment Act 1997. However, the events of La Rosa's case took place under the 1936 act.) In ruling that the stolen money constituted a "loss", the court applied the 1956 High Court decision in Charles Moore (WA) Pty Ltd v Commissioner of Taxation, where a deduction was allowed for money that had been stolen from a business while being taken to a bank. The cash was stolen from La Rosa "during operations to acquire trading stock" (specifically, a "substantial supply of prohibited drugs"). Because of this, the court upheld the AAT's original decision that the loss had a direct connection with the business operations and therefore fell under the general deduction provisions. As with income, the ITAA did not expressly prohibit deductions for expenses incurred in illegal activities.

The ATO submitted that the court should adopt a "purposive" rather than a literal approach to interpreting the ITAA's deduction provisions, as the ITAA contained sections barring deductions for fines, penalties, and bribes. It argued that, based on these existing "public-policy" exceptions, the unexpressed intent of the legislation was to prohibit deductions relating to illegal activities; the court should consequently read into the legislation an implied prohibition on claiming those deductions. The court rejected this submission on the grounds that a non-literal interpretation of the deduction provisions would be inconsistent with other areas of the ITAA and would cause uncertainty among taxpayers. It stated that it was the role of the legislature to determine public-policy exceptions to the deduction provisions, not that of the courts.

== Aftermath ==
The ATO sought leave to appeal to the High Court, the final court of appeal in the Australian legal system. In October 2004, the High Court announced that it had refused the appeal. In April 2005, Treasurer Peter Costello announced that the federal government would amend Australian tax law to deny deductions "incurred in the furtherance of, or directly in relation to, activities in respect of which the taxpayer has been convicted of an indictable offence". It did so by adding section 26-54 to the Income Tax Assessment Act 1997.

In June 2008, La Rosa and his wife Kim were reported missing. Their bodies were found in Chittering, Western Australia, in January 2009, and in 2011 Frank Mikhail and his son Adam were convicted of their murders. They were sentenced to life in prison.

== See also ==
- Income tax in Australia
- Taxation of illegal income in the United States—for similar rules around the treatment of expenses from illegal businesses in another jurisdiction
