= ITAA =

ITAA may refer to the following:

- Income Tax Assessment Act 1997
- Income Tax Assessment Act 1936
- Information Technology Association of America
- International Transactional Analysis Association
- Internet and Technology Addicts Anonymous, a self-help group for people suffering from internet addiction disorder
