= Bottom of the harbour tax avoidance =

Tax avoidance strategy used in Australia

Bottom of the harbour tax avoidance was a corporate tax avoidance scheme used in Australia in the 1970s. Legislation made it a criminal offence in 1980. The practice came to symbolise the worst of variously contrived tax strategies from those times. In its 1986/87 annual report, the Australian Taxation Office (ATO) stated a total 6,688 companies had been involved, involving revenue of between $500 million and $1 billion.

== Operation ==
The operation at the heart of bottom of the harbour schemes involved a company that would be stripped of assets and accumulated profits before its tax fell due, leaving it then unable to pay. Once assets were stripped, the company would be sent, metaphorically, to the "bottom of the harbour" by being transferred to someone of limited means and with little interest in its past activities. The company's records were often lost too. The ATO, being in the same position as other unsecured creditors in the case of an insolvent company, ended up with nothing.

Promoters such as lawyers or accountants generally facilitated the transactions. The promoter would help the owners of a company first transfer the assets to a new company which was to continue the business, then the owners sold the old company to the promoter for the value of the untaxed accumulated profits, less an amount representing a fee or commission. For the owners this was the sale of a capital asset and hence untaxed (being prior to capital gains tax).

The promoter would have the company pay (to the promoter) a dividend of the money it had left, then the promoter on-sold the now empty shell to someone else. The way the promoter paid the owners for undistributed profits was similar to a dividend strip operation. In any case the amount the promoter paid was a tax deduction (since the promoter would be in the business of buying and selling shares) and the dividend would be taxable income, leaving just the promoter's commission taxable, not the whole original company profit.

The term "harbour" in the expression was typically understood to refer to Sydney Harbour, located next to the financial district, though the sense of the phrase is also more general. The precise origin of the name and the practice remains unclear; however, newspaper articles from the time strongly suggest that computers holding electronic data on certain companies were destroyed by being disposed of in the harbour.

== Deputy Crown Solicitor debacle ==
The first time the Australian Taxation Office (ATO) detected a bottom of the harbour scheme was in 1973. Rod Todman, a senior investigations officer in Perth, found a scheme involving about 50 companies and selected one for investigation. By 1974, he had assembled evidence which was referred to the Deputy Crown Solicitor (DCS) in Perth for possible prosecution as a test case.

The DCS was uncertain of the prospects for the case, but in late 1974 had a Queen's Counsel opinion strongly recommending charges of conspiracy to defraud the Commonwealth be brought against the promoter and two other individuals. There then followed delay upon delay, duplicated investigations, ill-prepared reports by inexperienced officers, and even a DCS officer deliberately avoiding contact with the ATO.

After five full years, in April 1979, and based on miscommunication, the Crown Solicitor in Canberra advised the ATO that the evidence was insufficient and the case was dropped. The performance of the various DCS officers was later the subject of scathing criticism, with problems arising primarily from (possibly deliberately) overworked and underskilled staff, and bad management.

The abandoned case came to light in only 1982 in the Costigan Royal Commission investigating activities of the Federated Ship Painters and Dockers Union. The Commission came upon bank account transactions for millions of dollars, and the "paper trail" led eventually, and among other things, to the bottom drawers of the DCS Perth.

The commission also found that the wife of one of the senior case officers at the DCS Perth was running an escort service, and that she was a company secretary at several companies which were involved in bottom of the harbour schemes. There was no suggestion her husband improperly used his position, but the connection was close enough to be extremely embarrassing for all concerned, and the officer was dismissed.

== Legislation ==
=== Crimes (Taxation Offences) Act 1980 ===
In 1980, the Crimes (Taxation Offences) Act 1980 put an end to bottom of the harbour schemes. Under the act it became a criminal offence for any person to make a company or trust unable to pay tax debts (income tax, sales tax, etc.), or to aid or abet any person or company doing so. The act thus caught both those in the schemes and the promoters of such schemes. It made it unnecessary in the future to address the activity as a crime of defrauding the Commonwealth through the Deputy Crown Solicitor office, which up to this point had been poorly managed.

This act was controversial at the time, since tax avoidance was regarded as something less than an outright crime. Tax matters might normally be addressed by closing a revenue loophole, the act instead treated bottom of the harbour schemes like frauds. However, once certain behaviour has been criminalised, what was once tax avoidance (which is legal) becomes tax evasion (which, by definition, is not).

=== Taxation (Unpaid Company Tax) Assessment Act 1982 ===
The Taxation (Unpaid Company Tax) Assessment Act 1982 went further, allowing for the recovery of tax avoided under bottom of the harbour tax schemes between 1 January 1972 and 4 December 1980. The retrospectivity in this act was controversial at the time although some argued that law was not retrospective as the tax was always payable.

Treasurer John Howard said on 23 September 1982 during the second reading of the bill in the House of Representatives that the normal reluctance against retrospectivity was "tempered by the competing consideration of overall perceptions as to the equity and fairness of our taxation system and the distribution of the tax burden." whilst Senator Don Chipp thought the purpose noble but spoke strongly against the retrospective nature in the Senate on 19 November, saying "I do not trust politicians to legislate retrospectively. One of the few protections that the ordinary citizen has is that he knows the law."

== See also ==
- Taxation in Australia
- Vista purchase
