= Australian dividend imputation system =

Attributing corporate tax to shareholders to reduce their income tax

The Australian dividend imputation system is a corporate tax system in which some or all of the tax paid by a company may be attributed, or imputed, to the shareholders by way of a tax credit to reduce the income tax payable on a distribution. In comparison to the classical system, dividend imputation reduces or eliminates the tax disadvantages of distributing dividends to shareholders by only requiring them to pay the difference between the corporate rate and their marginal rate. If the individual’s average tax rate is lower than the corporate rate, the individual receives a tax refund.

The objective of the dividend imputation system is to eliminate double taxation of company profits, once at the corporate level and again on distribution as dividend to shareholders. Under the previous system, the company and shareholders had an incentive for the taxed income of the company to be retained by the company, or for the business activity not to be undertaken using a corporate structure.

== History ==
Before 1987, an Australian company would pay company tax on its profits at a flat rate of 49%; and if it then paid a dividend, the shareholder was subject to income tax on that dividend. The company and shareholders had an incentive for the taxed income of the company to be retained by the company. Paying a dividend gave raise to double taxation, once by the company at the corporate rate and then on dividend income in the hands of the company's shareholders.

Dividend imputation was introduced in Australia in 1987 by the Hawke–Keating Labor Government to create a "level playing field" and stopping the double taxation. The company tax rate was reduced to 39% in 1988 and 33% in 1993, and increased again in 1995 to 36%, to be reduced to 34% in 2000 and 30% in 2001, where it has been since.

Eligibility rules (below) were introduced by the Howard–Costello Liberal Government in 1997, with a $2,000 small shareholder exemption. The small shareholder exemption was raised to the present $5,000 in 1999. Since 1 July 2000, franking credits have been fully refundable, not just reducing tax liability to zero, and the "holding period rule" has applied. In 2002, preferential dividend streaming was banned. In 2003, New Zealand companies could elect to join the system for Australian tax they paid.

In 2015/16, designated "small business entities" with an aggregated annual turnover threshold of less than $2 million became eligible for a lower tax rate of 28.5%. Since 1 July 2016, the tax rate for business entities with aggregated annual turnover of less than $10 million has been 27.5%. From 2017/18, corporate entities eligible for the lower tax rate have been known as "base rate entities" and the turnover threshold has remained at $10 million, though the base rate entity threshold (the aggregated annual turnover threshold under which entities will be eligible to pay a lower tax rate) has continued to rise.

== Operation ==
A company would report and pay tax at the company tax rate in the normal manner. The company would keep track of the company tax it has paid in a franking account. If and when the company distributes money to shareholders in the form of dividends, it would indicate to shareholders the amount of franking credits it has applied to the dividend, and deduct the amount from its franking account. The franking amount cannot be greater than the company’s tax rate. When the shareholders lodge their tax returns, they include the dividend and the franking amount in their taxable income, but the shareholders are also entitled to claim a tax credit for this franking amount. The shareholders would then pay tax calculated on the basis of their marginal tax rate, which may be higher or lower than the company tax rate.

Companies which have paid Australian company tax can declare how much of the tax paid, recorded as franking credit, is to be attached to a dividend. Dividends paid with the maximum franking credit allowable are called fully franked dividends, and Australian-resident shareholders who receive them would declare both the dividends and the associated franking credits on their tax returns in addition to all other ordinary income. They are also entitled to claim back a credit for the value of the franking credit. A company may distribute dividends though it has no franking credits (perhaps because it has been making tax losses), which are called an unfranked dividends. It may also pay a franked portion and an unfranked portion, known as partly franked. An unfranked dividend (or the unfranked portion) is ordinary income in the hands of the shareholder.

For example, if a company makes a profit of $100 and pays company tax of $30 (at 2006 rates), it records the $30 in the franking account. The company now has $70 of retained profit to pay a dividend, either in the same year or later years. When it does so, it may attach a franking credit from its franking account, in proportion to the tax rate. If a $70 dividend is paid to which $30 of franking credits are attached, the franking account is reduced by $30.

An eligible shareholder receiving a franked dividend declares as income the cash received, plus the franking credit. The franking credit is then credited against the tax payable on their income. The effect is as if the tax office reversed the company tax by giving back the $30 to the shareholder and had them treat the original $100 of profit as income, in the shareholder's hands, like the company was merely a conduit.

Thus company profits distributed to eligible shareholders are taxed in their entirety at the shareholder's rate. Profits retained by the company or distributed to ineligible shareholders remain taxed at the corporate rate.

Non-resident shareholders are not entitled to claim a tax credit or refund of imputation credits, nor are they required to gross-up their taxable income. Unfranked dividends received by non-residents are subject to a withholding tax, which does not apply to franked dividends.

The actual law is complex, the core is in the Income Tax Assessment Act 1936 and other elements are in the Income Tax Assessment Act 1997.

Initially, in 1987, excess franking credits over the tax liability were lost, but since 2000, such excess credits have been refundable.

== Franking credits ==
Companies decide what proportion of the dividends they pay will have franking credits attached. This can range from the dividend being fully franked to it being entirely unfranked. A franking credit is a nominal unit of tax paid by companies using dividend imputation.

Shareholders who are residents of Australia for tax purposes include in their assessable income the grossed-up dividend amount (being the total of the dividend payable plus the associated franking credits). The income tax payable by the shareholders is calculated, and the franking credits are applied to offset the tax payable. In Australia and New Zealand the end result is the elimination of double taxation of company profits.

=== Franking credit formula ===
For a company that pays tax on all its income in Australia, the franking proportion is usually 100% (or 1). However, some companies (particularly those paying tax outside of Australia) have a lower franking proportion.

==== Fully franked dividend ====
Franking Credits = (Dividend Amount / (1 − Company Tax Rate)) − Dividend Amount

Example - a company pays a 30% company tax rate and distributes a $7.00 dividend to shareholders:

Franking Credits = ($7.00 / (1 − 0.3)) − $7.00

= ($7.00 / (0.7)) − $7.00

= $10.00 − $7.00

= $3.00

Franking Credits = $3.00

The shareholder is credited $3.00.

==== Partially franked dividend ====
Franking Credits from Partial Franking = ((Dividend Amount / (1 − Company Tax Rate)) − Dividend Amount) × Franking Proportion

Example - a company pays a 30% company tax rate but is only eligible for 50% franking and distributed a $7.00 dividend to shareholders:

Franking Credits from Partial Franking = (($7.00 / (1 − 0.3)) − $7.00) × 0.5

= (($7.00 / (0.7)) − $7.00) × 0.5

= ($10.00 − $7.00) × 0.5

= $3.00 × 0.5

= $1.50

Franking Credits from Partial Franking = $1.50

The shareholder is credited $1.50.

== Refund ==
Franking credits on dividends received after 1 July 2000 are refundable tax credits. It is a form of tax prepayment, which can reduce a taxpayer's total tax liability, with any excess being refunded. For example, an individual with income below the tax-free threshold ($18,200 since 2011/12) will pay no tax at all and can get a refund of the franking credits in full, after a tax return is lodged.

Prior to 1 July 2000 such excess franking credits were lost. For example, an individual at the time with an income below the tax free threshold would lose the value of the tax prepaid, and would merely keep the cash portion of the dividend received.

== Investors ==
A franking credit is income of the shareholder, though it is not received in cash. It is a credit towards tax that may be payable by the shareholder. Thus a franked dividend of $0.70 plus a $0.30 franking credit is equivalent to an unfranked dividend of $1.00, or to bank interest of $1.00, or any other ordinary income of that amount. (It is exactly equivalent because franking credits are fully refundable, as described above.)

Franked dividends are often described as a "tax effective" form of income. The basis for this is that the cash $0.70 looks like it is taxed at a lower rate than other income. For example, for an individual on the top rate of 48.5% (for 2006) the calculation is $0.70 plus $0.30 credit is $1.00 on which $0.485 tax is payable, but less the $0.30 credit makes $0.185 net tax, which is just 26.4% of the original $0.70. Conversely, an individual on the 20% marginal tax rate actually gets a $0.10 rebate. In this latter case, the rebate looks very much like negative tax.

There's nothing inherently wrong with the latter way of thinking about franked dividends, and it is frequently made to demonstrate how franking benefits the investor, but it can be argued a grossing-up like the former is better when comparing yields across different investment opportunities.

== Restrictions on eligibility ==
There are restrictions on who can claim franking credits. Those who cannot claim the credit simply declare as income the cash part of the dividend amount received, and ignore the franking credit on the tax return. The "holding period rule" has applied since 1 July 2000. Its objective is to prevent traders buying shares on the last cum-dividend date and selling them the following day ex-dividend. The typical result would be that the trader would receive the dividend, together with the franking credits, while incurring an equivalent capital loss and qualifying for the franking credit with only overnight risk in holding the shares.

An eligible shareholder is one who either:

- holds the shares for a continuous period of 45 days or more (not counting purchase and sale days); or 90 days in the case of certain preference shares. This is the "holding period rule". Shares must be "at risk" for the necessary period, i.e. not with an offsetting derivatives position for instance, or
- has total franking credits for the tax year of less than $5000 (the "small shareholder exemption") and has not arranged to pass-on the benefits to someone else (the "related payments rule").

Thus franking credits are not available to short-term traders, only to longer term holders, but with small holders exempted provided it's for their own benefit.

The small shareholder exemption is not a "first $5000", but rather once the $5000 threshold is passed the rule is inoperative and all the shares are under the holding period rule.

For the holding period rule, parcels of shares bought and sold at different times are reckoned on a "first in, last out" basis. Each sale is taken to be of the most recently purchased shares. This prevents a taxpayer buying just before a dividend, selling just after, and asserting it was older shares sold (to try to fulfill the holding period).

This "first in, last out" reckoning may be contrasted with capital gains tax. For capital gains the shareholder can nominate what parcel was sold from among those bought at different times.

== Company shareholders ==
A dividend received by a company shareholder is income of the receiving company, but the dividend income is not grossed-up for the franking credit nor is the receiving company entitled to claim the franking credit as a tax credit. Instead, the franking credit is added directly to the receiving company's franking account, and can be paid out in the same way as franking credits generated by the receiving company.

This transfer of credits has made the previous "intercorporate rebates" allowances redundant. Those rebates had avoided double taxation on dividends paid from one company to another company. Those rebates were part of the original 1936 Taxation Act (section 46), meaning that the principle of eliminating double taxation has been present to some degree in Australian income tax law for a very long time.

The company tax rate has changed a few times since the introduction of dividend imputation. In each case transitional rules have been made to maintain the principle of reversing the original tax paid, even if the tax rate has changed. This has been either by separate franking accounts for separate rates (e.g. class A 39%, class B 33%), or making an adjusting recalculation of the credits (e.g. into class C 30%).

== Trans-Tasman Imputation ==
New Zealand companies can apply to join the Australian dividend imputation system (from 2003). Doing so allows them to attach Australian franking credits to their dividends, for Australian tax they have paid. Those credits can then be used by shareholders who are Australian taxpayers, the same as dividends from an Australian company.

There are certain anti-tax-avoidance rules to prevent New Zealand companies deliberately streaming Australian franking credits towards their Australian shareholders; credits must be distributed on a pro-rata basis.

Note that it is only Australian franking credits which can be used by an Australian taxpayer. New Zealand imputation credits on dividends paid to an Australian shareholder cannot be used against that shareholder's Australian taxes.

== Dividend streaming ==
A company can determine the level of franking credits it will attach to its dividends, and they are not obliged to attach any franking credits. However, it costs the company nothing to attach the maximum amounts of credits it has available, which is the usual practice to benefit eligible shareholders. It is actually possible for a company to attach more franking credits than it has, but doing so attracts certain tax penalties.

Until 2002 it was permissible for companies to direct the flow of franking credits preferentially to one type of shareholder over another so that each could benefit the most as fits their tax circumstances. For example, franking credits are of no use to foreign shareholders, who cannot offset them against withholding tax, but Australian shareholders can claim them as a tax credit. This practice, known as dividend streaming, became illegal in 2002, after which all dividends within a given time frame must be franked to a similar (but need not be identical) degree irrespective of shareholder location or which class of shares they hold.

== Division 7A and debit loans by private companies ==
Division 7A of the Tax Act applies where there is a loan, payment or the forgiveness of a loan to a shareholder or an associate of a shareholder of a private company. When such amounts are not repaid by the end of a financial year they may be treated as unfranked dividends. The total of all dividends a private company can be taken to pay under Division 7A is limited to its "distributable surplus" for that income year, which includes the retained earnings plus provisions made for accounting purposes.

An 'associate' is very broad and generally includes a trust under which a shareholder can benefit. This will mean that Division 7A can apply to loans to discretionary trusts and unit trusts in the family group, and sometimes to such trusts not in a family group.

== Effective elimination of company tax and thus incentives ==
To a large extent, dividend imputation makes company tax irrelevant. This is because every dollar that a company pays in company tax could potentially be claimed by an eligible shareholder as franking credit, and the revenue flowing to the government would ultimately be received only at the shareholder's tax rate. However, profits retained for use by the company and income distributed as dividends to foreign investors remain taxed at the corporate tax rate.

One effect is that this has reduced the effectiveness of tax incentives for corporations. If a corporation was given a tax break and no tax was paid, then its income would not generate franking credits. In turn, this meant that the shareholders received fewer credits along with their dividends, and paid tax on the full value as ordinary income. It also reduces the benefit of corporate tax avoidance in the same way.

The net result is that each tax break a corporation received was countered by a matching increase in the tax burden of shareholders, leaving shareholders in exactly the same position as had more tax been paid by the corporation. Thus, to the extent that corporate directors acted so as to increase shareholder wealth, tax incentives would not influence corporate behaviour.

When gross company tax is reported by Treasury, it is unclear whether the number generally includes the effect of the corresponding franking credits.

== Politics and economics ==
Dividend imputation has been uncontroversial over most of its lifetime. Investors and their advisors recognise the benefits and are supportive.

In October 2006, the Committee for Economic Development of Australia released a report, Tax Cuts to Compete, concluding that dividend imputation had proved an inefficient means of reducing Australia's cost of capital. The report, authored by prominent economist Dr Nicholas Gruen, argued that the elimination of imputation would allow the funding of a substantial corporate tax cut. This would attract foreign investment and thus increase economic growth, it said.

During the 2019 Australian federal election the Australian Labor Party made what ultimately became a controversial reform proposal to dividend imputation or franking credits.

== See also ==
- Corporate tax
- Dividend stripping, on buying shares to access dividends
- Dividend tax
- fr:Avoir fiscal (in French)
