= Mullens v Federal Commissioner of Taxation =

Judgement of the High Court of Australia

- Court: High Court of Australia
- Decided: 9 September 1976
- Citations: [1976] HCA 47, (1976) 135 CLR 290

Case history
- Prior action: Bridges v Commissioner of Taxation (Cth) (1974) 5 ATR 120; 74 ATC 4339
- Appealed from: Supreme Court of NSW

Court membership
- Judges sitting: Barwick CJ, McTiernan, Stephen JJ

Case opinions
- (2:1) A taxpayer may enter circumstances explicitly described by the Income Tax Assessment Act 1936 without attracting the anti-avoidance provisions of section 260, even if the purpose is a tax benefit gained.

Mullens v Federal Commissioner of Taxation, was a 1976 High Court of Australia tax case concerning arrangements where stockbrokers Mullens & Co accessed tax deductions for monies subscribed to a petroleum exploration company. The Australian Taxation Office held the scheme was tax avoidance, but the court found for the taxpayer.

In the taxonomy of tax schemes, this was of the kind where a wholly intentional tax benefit is swapped or traded between taxpayers, from someone who can't make full use of it to someone who can.

The principal significance of the case today is its part in judicial interpretation of the section 260 anti-avoidance provisions of the Income Tax Assessment Act 1936.

== Background ==
=== Transaction 1 ===
In 1968 a company called Vam Limited proposed to explore for natural gas in fields in South Australia and in south-western Queensland. In August 1968 it formed a new company Vamgas NL whose sole business would be that exploration. As a petroleum exploration company, monies subscribed for shares in Vamgas would be tax deductible under section 77A of the Income Tax Assessment Act 1936 as it stood at that time.

Vamgas shares had a par value of $0.50 each and Vam itself took up 5 million part paid to $0.10 each. Another 5 million, to be fully paid, were offered by way of a prospectus; 3 million to Vam shareholders and 2 million reserved for clients of the underwriting stockbroker and certain other brokers (Mullens & Co was not one of them). The offer to the Vam shareholders was by way of non-renounceable rights, which meant they could take them up or let them lapse, but could not sell or transfer them to someone else.

Mr Close was chairman of the board at Vam. He and his family and friends were substantial shareholders in Vam. They wanted to have an interest in the Vamgas, but couldn't afford to pay for their full allotment of shares (about 433,800, worth $216,900), and/or didn't have enough other income to make use of the tax deductions to be had by subscribing. Mullens & Co stockbrokers knew about the offer (and had had other dealings with Vam) and was in the opposite situation, it had access to funds and had income which it could usefully offset with deductions, but had no particular interest in Vamgas. Close worked with Mullens on the following mutually beneficial arrangement.

The Vam shareholders created trusts under which they took up their Vamgas rights and paid for their new shares with money provided by Mullens. The shares were in the names of those various Vam shareholders, but as trustees, with Mullens (or associates) the beneficial owners. Mullens granted those shareholders options allowing them to buy the Vamgas shares, if they wished, for the issue price (i.e. what Mullens had paid), any time until 15 May 1969 (that being a few months after the issue). The benefits of this scheme were,

- Mullens got a tax deduction for the $216,900 subscribed to Vamgas. But assuming the Vam shareholders did exercise their options, then Mullens got all that money back, its only actual expense would be interest on the money for the short period until exercise (they financed with a bank overdraft).
- The Vam shareholders got any market price rise above the issue price of the new Vamgas shares, with no cash outlay or risk.

In effect the Vam shareholders had swapped their potential tax deductions for a combination of short-term finance and protection against the share price falling. It seems Mullens wasn't too concerned about the latter possibility, and indeed Vamgas did rise when it listed on the stock exchange.

The Vam shareholders exercised their options on 14 May 1969, the day before expiry, and paid Mullens the $0.50 per share strike price. They got the money by selling some of their shares (having risen in price) or by selling some new further rights which Vamgas had issued. (Vamgas made a one-for-one rights issue shortly after listing, and under the option conditions such rights belonged to the option holder, i.e. those Vam shareholders, not Mullens.)

One of the Vam shareholders, a Mrs Walser, had on 3 April 1969 sold (at a profit) the Vamgas shares she held in trust. This was, strictly speaking, before she exercised her option. Mullens was the selling broker and was obviously unconcerned by formalities of exercise dates, but it did cause Mr Bridges (a partner in Mullens) considerable embarrassment in the court (below) because it gave the impression Mrs Walser regarded the shares as hers to trade, and on that basis maybe the trust documents were a sham and she was really the owner. The latter was what the Australian Taxation Office contended.

=== Transaction 2 ===
A second similar transaction took place in May 1969, this time between the Vam company itself and the Mullens group. Vam had to pay the $0.40 balance of its part-paid Vamgas shares, but it had enough of its own tax deductions that it didn't need those it would get from section 77A by subscribing money to Vamgas. So instead it negotiated with Mullens on the following further transaction.

Mullens and several associates on 23 May 1969 bought 1,250,000 of Vam's $0.10 part-paid Vamgas shares, for the paid-up value of $125,000. Mullens agreed to give Vam first refusal to buy the shares back, at market price. A few weeks later, on 17 June 1969, they did indeed sell them back to Vam for $0.50 each (with Mullens paying the stamp duty). This was just under the prevailing market price of $0.51.

The fact that the sale back to Vam was for exactly what Mullens had paid out seems to have been a happy coincidence, i.e. that the market price was exactly that amount at the time; the price later fell to $0.30.

It appears Vam gave up its potential tax benefit for no more than a three-week deferral of its payment on the Vamgas call. Such a small consideration might suggest there wasn't an active kind of market in trading such tax benefits.

=== Supreme Court of NSW ===
Seven partners of the Mullens stockbroking firm and four companies associated with them appealed to the Supreme Court of NSW against the tax assessments made by the Australian Taxation Office (ATO). By consent the eleven appeals were heard together and evidence given in each one was treated as evidence in each of the others.

The ATO argued that either the two Vam transactions above were shams, or that if they were real then they came under the section 260 anti-avoidance provisions of the Income Tax Assessment Act 1936.

A "sham" in this context would mean there was some different underlying arrangement between the parties, and the documents they made were never meant to be enforced (or worse, written or re-written after the fact). The actual arrangement the ATO posited was that Mullens had simply lent money.

Justice Sheppard agreed with the ATO, noting in particular Mrs Walser's dealings, and decided for the ATO as submitted, but without ruling on which alternative was the case (sham or section 260).

== High Court ==
All eleven people and companies appealed to the High Court. The initial appeal in the Supreme Court also concerned other transactions relating to share sales on capital versus income account were also decided, but they were not taken further and don't have a bearing on the Vam transactions and section 260. Mullens was chosen as symptomatic of those of other taxpayers associated with him as they all had the same facts and the result of all appeals was the same.

The High Court upheld the appeal and found for the taxpayer in a 2-1 decision, with Chief Justice Barwick and Justice Stephen finding for the taxpayer, and Justice McTiernan finding for the ATO.

McTiernan's judgement was that the transactions formally met the requirements of section 77A for deductibility, but that the only practical purpose of them was to relieve Mullens from tax liabilities and hence they came under section 260 as altering the incidence of taxation. (This judgement meant he didn't need to consider the alternative that the transactions might have been a sham.)

Barwick and Stephen on the other hand firstly disagreed with Justice Sheppard's initial conclusion that the transactions could have been shams, finding the documentation and negotiations between the parties ample. They noted in particular that Mullens didn't get the "two-way" option it had wanted (the right to force the Vam shareholders to buy back), so there was a real commercial risk being borne.

Both justices then also disagreed with Sheppard and with McTiernan that section 260 applied. Their view was that section 77A was unequivocal about giving a tax benefit to those who subscribed for petroleum shares, like Mullens had. They noted there were no extra conditions in that section to be fulfilled (though perhaps there ought to have been for instance a minimum holding period).

So with Mullens satisfying the requirements of a section of the act, applying section 260 would take away something the act explicitly gave. Stephen noted Justice Menzies in Ellers Motor Sales Pty Ltd v Federal Commissioner of Taxation (1969) who said it could not be that an advantage in one part of the act "was given merely to be taken away by the operation of s.260".

The decision here that section 260 did not apply extended the prior "choice principle" from Keighery v Federal Commissioner of Taxation. That case allowed the taxpayer to choose between two alternatives in the act, the Mullens decision allowed a taxpayer to enter a particular set of circumstances described by the act for the purpose of gaining the effects it described, even if those effects were beneficial. This latter principle was subsequently used in cases such as Cridland.

== Subsequently ==
Section 77A of the ITAA 1936 was repealed before the court cases, that tax concession having apparently served its purpose.

A not dissimilar example of tax benefit shifting came with dividend imputation in the 1990s. Foreigners were unable to use the imputation credits and so instead "sold" them to Australian institutions by transferring the shares to them just across the dividend record date. General anti-avoidance provisions didn't apply, because both parties' taxable incomes increased. A holding period rule of the kind alluded to by Barwick and Stephen above had to be instituted.
