= Cridland v Federal Commissioner of Taxation =

Judgement of the High Court of Australia

- Court: High Court of Australia
- Decided: 30 November 1977
- Citations: [1977] HCA 61, (1977) 140 CLR 330

Case history
- Prior action: Cridland v Commissioner of Taxation (Cth) (1976) 6 ATR 212; 9 ALR 631; 76 ATC 4095
- Appealed from: Supreme Court of NSW

Court membership
- Judges sitting: Barwick CJ, Stephen, Mason, Jacobs & Aickin JJ

Case opinions
- (5:0) Following the decision in Mullens, when the statute explicitly provides tax benefits for taxpayers in certain circumstances, taxpayers may deliberately enter those circumstances without attracting the anti-avoidance provisions of section 260 of the ITAA 1936

Cridland v Federal Commissioner of Taxation, was a 1977 High Court of Australia case concerning a novel tax scheme whereby some 5,000 university students became primary producers (as in farmers) for tax purposes, allowing them certain income averaging benefits. The Australian Taxation Office held this was tax avoidance, but the test case was decided in favour of the taxpayer, one of the students, Brian Cridland.

In the taxonomy of tax schemes, this one was in the category of a wholly intentional tax benefit but which people other than those intended came to access. Amendments tightening the definition of a primary producer were subsequently made, so such a scheme would fail today.

== Scheme ==
In 1968, Brisbane accountant D. P. O'Shea was a partner in the firm Fadden and O'Shea and was, as the court said, "versed in the arts of tax minimization". He hit upon a scheme to access the income averaging provisions of division 16 of the Income Tax Assessment Act 1936 (ITAA). Income averaging allowed a taxpayer to spread income over multiple tax years and was meant for primary producers (farmers etc.) with highly variable incomes. Section 157 provided that if a trust is carrying on a business of primary production, then all the income beneficiaries are likewise considered carrying on such a business.

O'Shea had one of his companies acquire land and lease (or otherwise grant) use of that to newly formed unit trusts. Those trusts were to acquire livestock or similar so as to carry on a business of primary production. The money for all this was lent by O'Shea or associates and the trusts were to end after 21 years, at which point all assets reverted to him or associates. The actual assets and production, it seems, were to be small, and in any case remain effectively under O'Shea's control.

In 1969 O'Shea distributed pamphlets advertising his scheme at universities in Queensland, New South Wales and Victoria. Students were to pay a nominal sum of $1 to join. Over 5,000 responded and became beneficiaries of the No. 1 trust. Brian Cridland, the subject of the court action, was a student at the University of Queensland nearing the end of his engineering degree course. He became a beneficiary of the No. 2 trust and then in 1970 was transferred to the No. 4 trust when the No. 2 ceased operation.

The payment of $1 each was not meant to make a profit for O'Shea and associates, in fact it was seldom collected. The trust deeds allowed the trustee to register a person if the trustee was satisfied the person had donated at least $1 either to an institution under section 78 of the ITAA (various museums, cultural funds, etc.), or to a similar body approved by a university Student Representative Council. O'Shea even made a $500 payment to a section 78 body himself to cover anyone who might fail to have a documented payment themselves (and therefore might have failed to meet the formal requirements of the scheme).

Any income actually earned by the trusts would, or would not be, distributed to some or all beneficiaries entirely at the discretion of the trustee. Beneficiaries were not actually going to receive income, or nothing significant, just be "presently entitled" to satisfy section 157. Cridland for instance said to the court he didn't expect any income, he did receive $1 in each of June 1969, 1970 and 1971 though.

The pamphlets described an annual payment of $50 to be made by subscribers, but only if and when they saved at least that much tax. It also pointed out there was no way anyone could be forced to make such a payment, it would rely on the honesty of participants. No such amounts were actually paid.

It seems O'Shea made no profit from the scheme. Presumably if he was creating a scheme for himself anyway then it cost little to let others join, and perhaps the scheme brought other business for his accounting firm.

== Courts ==
The Australian Taxation Office decided the scheme was a form of tax avoidance, and under the general anti-avoidance provision of ITAA section 260 (which was operative at that time) they ignored Cridland's interest in the trusts and issued assessments for tax years ending 30 June 1970, 1971 and 1972 accordingly. Cridland took the matter to the Supreme Court of New South Wales, where Justice Mahoney agreed with the commissioner.

Section 260 was worded very broadly, striking out any agreement "altering the incidence of any income tax". If taken literally then almost any everyday business transaction would come under it. Consequently, it had been "read down" in case law over the years to decide when it should not apply. This included not applying it to transactions "of a normal character", nor as decided in Keighery v Federal Commissioner of Taxation (1957) to matters where the statute contains alternatives available to the taxpayer (in that case a public versus private company).

Cridland argued that this latter "choice principle" applied, that becoming the beneficiary of a trust was a choice allowed by section 157; and if the statute explicitly provides consequences for people in certain positions then they should be able to utilize those. Justice Mahoney decided section 157 was not a choice in this sense and which the taxpayer could make of themselves, and indeed regarded the section as having a more mechanical nature so that primary producers operating their business via a trust could come under division 16.

Cridland appealed to the High Court, where Chief Justice Barwick and Justices Stephen, Mason, Jacobs and Aickin instead unanimously found for him and against the ATO, holding the choice principle was not so narrow as Mahoney had interpreted it.

The justices followed their own High Court decision in Mullens v Federal Commissioner of Taxation (1976), not decided until after Mahoney had made his judgement. In Mullens they determined that if the statute provides certain consequences then a taxpayer may enter into circumstances or transactions to which the statute applies, and that section 260 does not strike those out just because this is to the taxpayer's advantage.

The justices were in no doubt though that a transaction like Cridland had entered into was not normal for a university student, and was only explicable for attracting the income averaging provisions, but such considerations could not override the fact that the transaction was one to which specific provisions of the ITAA applied.

== Subsequently ==
Following the High Court's decision, Treasurer John Howard introduced amendments in the Income Tax Assessment Amendment Bill 1978 restricting the definition of a primary producer in section 157. As from 1 July 1978 there are now two further requirements,

- A minimum $1,040 must be received from the trust.
- The Commissioner of Taxation must be satisfied the beneficiary's interest wasn't acquired primarily for the purpose of obtaining income averaging.

These requirements act to prevent a similar broad-based scheme today, but don't deny income averaging benefits to farming families operating their business through a trust. (Trusts as an ownership structure have some advantages for ongoing family businesses and are and were quite often used in farming.)
