= Slutzkin v Federal Commissioner of Taxation =

1977 Australian High Court case

- Court: High Court of Australia
- Decided: 25 February 1977
- Citations: [1977] HCA 9, (1977) 140 CLR 314

Case history
- Prior action: Slutzkin v Federal Commissioner of Taxation (1976) 6 ATR 81, 9 ALR 76, 76 ATC 4019
- Appealed from: Supreme Court of NSW

Court membership
- Judges sitting: Barwick CJ, Stephen, Aickin JJ

Case opinions
- (3:0) Sale of a company is a capital transaction for the seller, even if the buyer is likely or is intending to perform a dividend strip.

Slutzkin v Federal Commissioner of Taxation, was a High Court of Australia case concerning the tax position of company owners who sold to a dividend stripping operation. The Australian Taxation Office (ATO) claimed the proceeds should be treated as dividends, but the Court held they were a capital sum like an ordinary investment asset sale.

In the taxonomy of tax schemes the overall operation was a classic exploitation of income versus capital dichotomy. But there was no need for contrivance or collusion, the different tax treatment to each party simply made the transaction an advantage to both.

The principal interest in the case today is its part in judicial interpretation of the section 260 anti-avoidance provisions of the Income Tax Assessment Act 1936, and indirectly in overall dividend stripping operations of the time (insofar as action against the vendors' position failed).

== Background ==
Alan Slutzkin owned a group of businesses and in April 1964 formed a company, Francis Richard Holdings Pty Ltd, which he used as a holding company for his trading companies. The shares of Francis Richards were held by Slutzkin and his associates as trustees for his children.

The holding company structure allowed group profits to be retained and used as working capital. But from 1 July 1967 the law on undistributed profits tax changed and Francis Richards as constituted could no longer serve that purpose. Consequently, Slutzkin formed a new holding company to continue it.

In late 1968 Slutzkin wished to dispose of Francis Richards, to save ongoing accounting fees and operating costs. His solicitor and advisor Rodney Rosenblum (also one of the trustee shareholders of Francis Richards) had started dividend stripping with a company called Cadiz and offered to have Cadiz buy Francis Richards for the value of its accumulated profits.

The advantage to Slutzkin of selling instead of liquidating the company was that selling would be a capital transaction, and therefore tax-free, whereas in liquidation the final dividend distribution would be taxed as income. Cadiz required the company to have only cash assets, and no liabilities, so bank term deposits were called in and remaining liabilities paid out.

On 12 November 1968 Francis Richards had a balance sheet total of $105,124.70, and was sold to Cadiz for $104,393.30. That sale was the extent of the involvement of Slutzkin and the other trustee (Slutzkin's accountant Gordon Hapgood), but Rosenblum's role continued in Cadiz. He had taken legal advice on the propriety of acting on both sides of the transaction and in any case the tax treatment, and court case were not affected by his multiple positions.

Cadiz then proceeded with its dividend strip, causing Francis Richards to pay dividends totalling $103,744.70. Cadiz then on-sold the company for $6,831.96, a price possible because as a private company which had paid out an excess distribution (under section 106 of the ITAA) it was worth more than its asset value. The net profit to Cadiz was $6,183.36 before expenses.

The Australian Taxation Office (ATO) claimed that selling Francis Richards, rather than liquidating or declaring a dividend, constituted a tax avoidance scheme, and that the proceeds should be treated as income in the hands of the trustee shareholders. The ATO added corresponding amounts to their assessments for the year ending 30 June 1969.

Slutzkin and the others appealed to the Supreme Court of New South Wales. This matter was only undertaken by the vendors, the buyer Cadiz was not a party to the action. Justice Rath agreed with the ATO and dismissed the appeal, whereupon Slutzkin appealed to the High Court.

== Decision ==
In the High Court, Chief Justice Garfield Barwick and justices Stephen and Aickin overturned Justice Rath's decision and found unanimously for Slutzkin. The justices were adamant that the proceeds to Slutzkin and the vendors were a capital sum, representing the sale of an investment. Slutzkin had arranged the company's affairs in a form that would make it desirable for the purchaser Cadiz, but what Cadiz was going to do later was not something they could know or have an interest in.

The judges held section 260 could not apply because firstly a capital sale was a transaction which had no income tax consequences, and secondly because section 260 is an "annihilating" provision. It could void a contract, but that was all, it did not reconstruct a transaction or impose tax in a new form. Only if the voided contracts left some set of facts taxable by other parts of the act would it result in new taxation. Barwick cited the 1976 New Zealand case Europa Oil (N.Z.) Ltd v Commissioner of Inland Revenue (N.Z.) (No. 2) on that point.

== Result ==
This kind of transaction came to be called a Slutzkin Scheme, though that term may have had limited currency. It doesn't appear Slutzkin was the first, or the last, nor even the biggest example of such transactions.

The tax landscape has changed considerably since these times. The anti-avoidance provisions of Part IVA are much broader and specifically apply against dividend stripping of the kind Cadiz used. Capital gains tax would apply to Slutzkin's proceeds too.
