= Cridland =

Cridland is a family surname from Somerset in England. The name may refer to:

== People ==
- John Cridland (born 1961), British businessman
- John Cridland Latham (1888–1975), American soldier and Medal of Honor recipient
- Joseph Cridland, Canadian politician
- Tim Cridland, an American sideshow performer with stage name Zamora the Torture King
- Ansel Cridland, member of The Meditations, a reggae vocal harmony group from Jamaica
- Clarissa Cridland co-operator of Girls Gone By Publishers, a publishing company based in Bath, Somerset

== Other ==
- Cridland v Federal Commissioner of Taxation (1977), Australian court case
