= Cherry-picking tax avoidance =

Cherry picking tax avoidance was a form of tax avoidance used in Australia in the 1970s and early 1980s. Company contributions to a superannuation fund were claimed as tax deductions, but the money immediately went back to the company.

In the taxonomy of tax schemes, this one was an obvious abuse of an intended system. The Australian Taxation Office was able to attack the scheme, at least in some instances, on the basis that the funds were not in fact ones that benefited employees (a legislative requirement for tax deductibility).

== Operation ==
A company would create a superannuation fund, with an associate as the trustee. The company paid money into the fund, ostensibly for the benefit of particular employees. Under section 82AAE (now repealed) of the Income Tax Assessment Act 1936 such contributions were tax deductible (to a limit of 5% of initial salary or $400, whichever was greater). But the trustee of the fund would immediately lend the money back to the company on favourable terms, such as a low interest rate and unsecured. So the company got a tax deduction but kept its money.

Employees were not being defrauded. Their wages and conditions didn't provide for any superannuation, so they received everything they expected to and were unaware of the super fund notionally in their names.

The trustee of the fund normally had to declare in its annual report to the Australian Taxation Office that all members of the fund had been notified of their rights to benefits. But this was never the case, employees were kept deliberately in the dark.

The company's officers would arrange that employees never satisfied the formal requirements of the fund for payment of benefits. Those requirements might for instance be for a member to remain employed by the company until a specified retirement age. Employees would be sacked or persuaded to leave before that age, and the benefits they forfeited (in ignorance) would become fund reserves or would be attributed to other members (which normally included the company owners themselves).

== Raymor ==
Details of one cherry picking scheme came out in 1981 and 1982 in the Supreme Court of New South Wales in the case of Kelly v Raymor (Illawarra) Pty Ltd.

The Raymor Group of companies was owned by brothers Paul and William Kelly and created its super fund in June 1973. The trustee was a company Raymor (Illawarra) Pty Ltd, which had as directors the brothers and their trusted secretary Joy Mawson. The fund was purely for tax purposes, so although it was announced to the staff the impression was then allowed to build that the idea had been abandoned.

The Raymor companies claimed deductions for contributions made in tax years ending 30 June 1973 through 30 June 1977, an amount of about $2.8 million on about 1,000 employees (not all employed at the one time, staff turnover was very high). The fund lent the money back at interest rates between 2.7% and 4.4% per annum. Some money was also lent to selected executives as a way of giving them a tax-free salary increase (a loan being untaxed).

The scheme halted in 1977 only because the maximum deductible limit had been reached for each employee. William Kelly even enrolled his three young children in the fund (supposed to be working as musicians) to get more employees. Ms Mawson from then on maintained a list of employees approaching retirement age, since they would (though they didn't know it) become entitled to benefits. Such employees were asked to leave a little earlier, or were re-employed as casuals or by a separate associated business. No employee was ever actually paid any benefits.

These details came out because Paul Kelly, who did not involve himself in daily operations of the business, suspected his brother William was arranging company matters to his own benefit, i.e. unequally. William Kelly and Ms Mawson had Raymor (Illawarra) Pty Ltd resign its position as trustee of the fund in order to prevent Paul Kelly examining the fund's books. Kelly then sued on behalf of the fund members, alleging his brother and Ms Mawson had breached their duties as trustees.

It's highly doubtful Paul Kelly had much actual concern about the fund and its members; for a start he'd known of the scheme from its inception. As Justice Wootten said, it may have just been a "convenient stick with which to beat his brother". In any event, the case was settled (Paul Kelly died during the course of the case).

Justice Wootten was apparently very unimpressed by the whole business and it seems would have welcomed the opportunity to make orders for the protection of fund members. In his report he cited the court rules that required him to accept discontinuation by the plaintiff. What he did do though was have his report sent to the Australian Taxation Office (ATO) and to the Department of Attorney General and Justice.

The ATO subsequently made amended tax assessments denying the Raymor Group deductions for its super fund contributions. Raymor went to the Federal Court in 1990 and 1991 to appeal against that, in the case Raymor Contractors Pty Ltd v Federal Commissioner of Taxation.

That case turned on whether the payments to the superfund met the requirements of section 82AAE for deductibility. Under that section the contribution had to be "for the purpose of making provision for superannuation benefits for, or for dependants of, any one employee". The court was satisfied the purpose was not employee benefits but tax benefits to the company, and hence found for the ATO.

== See also ==
- Taxation in Australia
