= Federal Commissioner of Taxation v Peabody =

Judgement of the High Court of Australia

Federal Commissioner of Taxation v Peabody was a 1994 High Court of Australia tax case concerning certain transactions made by the Peabody family business. The Australian Taxation Office (ATO) sought to apply the Part IVA general anti-avoidance provisions of the Income Tax Assessment Act 1936.

The case was decided in favour of the taxpayer Mary Peabody, on the slightly technical grounds that there wasn't a reasonable expectation she would have received the income in question (from the family trust) in the year and under the interpretation asserted by the ATO.

The significance of the case today, and the reason it is frequently cited, is principally its place in judicial interpretation of Part IVA. The ATO in particular did not regard the case as a complete loss; they took remarks in the judgements as confirming their interpretation of that legislation.

== Transaction ==
The Peabody family and Ray Kleinschmidt owned a business producing fly ash, also known as pozzolan, used in concrete. It was a set of four companies, called the Pozzolanic Group. Kleinschmidt owned 38%, and the Peabody family owned 62%, through a family trust. The trustee was a company of which husband and wife Terence and Mary Peabody were directors, and the beneficiaries were Mary Peabody and their two sons.

Terence Peabody had planned for some time to buy Kleinschmidt's share then float 50% of the total business on the Australian Securities Exchange (ASX). In late 1985 he and Kleinschmidt reached an agreement where Kleinschmidt would sell his shares for $8.6 million, an amount which was based on a business valuation and which was to remain confidential. Instead of Terence Peabody or the family trust buying out Kleinschmidt directly, the transaction was structured as follows.

The Peabody trust bought a shelf company called Loftway and Kleinschmidt sold his shares to it for the agreed $8.6 million. The Peabodys (now 100% owners) then had the Pozzolanic group companies convert those shares to "Z class" and restrict their rights, rendering them worthless. The shares the Peabody trust owned were then all that remained, a 100% interest in the business (apart from a few owned by Terence Peabody in his own name).

The money to pay Kleinschmidt was provided by Westpac subscribing for $8.6 million worth of Loftway preference shares. The interest on them was obtained from the Pozzolanic companies paying dividends to Loftway, which in turn paid dividends to Westpac. The capital was repaid after the float when the Peabody trust lent $8.6 million from the float proceeds to Loftway in order for it to redeem Westpac's shares. That loan was subsequently forgiven by the trust.

This indirect structure had three apparent purposes,

- Kleinschmidt's shares "disappeared", so when Pozzolanic floated it was not necessary to disclose how much Kleinschmidt was paid. This had two motivations,
  - It respected Kleinschmidt's wish for confidentiality.
  - It wouldn't make the new investors wonder why they were being asked to pay a higher price after just a short period of time. Kleinschmidt's sale valued the total business at $24 million, the float price valued it at $30 million.
- If the Peabody trust bought shares from Kleinschmidt then sold them to the public, it would have incurred capital gains tax on the price difference.
- The money borrowed (from Westpac) to pay Kleinschmidt could be obtained at lesser cost by paying interest with dividends, because dividends were eligible for intercorporate rebates in Westpac's hands.

The last point is a little unclear. Perhaps it was that Loftway's ownership of Pozzolanic shares was not an income producing purpose, so plain interest payments would not be tax deductible. If so then that would be in a sense a consequence of using Loftway, rather than an independent rationale for the structure.

== Assessment and court ==
The Australian Taxation Office (ATO) took the view that the mechanism was a tax avoidance scheme, a scheme which came under Part IVA of the Income Tax Assessment Act 1936. The ATO treated the transaction as Kleinschmidt selling to the Peabody trust, and then on-selling to the public in the float, making a profit of the difference. This was a capital gain, and the 1/3 of that attributable to Mary Peabody as trust beneficiary was $888,005. The ATO added that to her return for the year ending 30 June 1986.

Mary Peabody lodged an objection to the ATO assessment, which the ATO disallowed. She then asked the ATO to refer it to the Federal Court (as any taxpayer may do). Her argument was that the transaction was structured as it was for the commercial reasons of confidentiality and the cost of financing, as described above.

Justice O'Loughlin in the Federal Court agreed with the ATO that the devaluation to Z-class shares was a scheme, and considered the argument about non-disclosure to be a "red herring".

Mrs Peabody appealed to the full bench of the court, and they instead considered the transfer, financing and float together, and found for her. The ATO went to the High Court, which upheld the full bench decision.
