= High grading =

Selective harvesting to remove only valuable items

In forestry, fishing and mining, high grading refers to the selective harvesting of goods to keep only the most valuable items. The term is frequently associated with fraud, especially in mining.

== Forestry ==
In forestry, high grading, also sometimes referred to as selective logging, is a selective type of timber harvesting that removes the highest grade of timber (i.e. the most merchantable stems) in an area of forest. It is sometimes described by the phrase “cut the best and leave the rest”, and should not be confused with selection cutting.

Over time, high grading gives rise to forest stands containing stems of lower timber quality. The reduced income from timber can make it harder to fund good silvicultural practices, thereby impacting the economy of non-timber forest products and other activities such as hunting, wildlife watching or hiking. The practice also has an ecological cost, with a direct impact in terms of biodiversity, genetic diversity and species mix. Finally, it may cause forest to become unsafe due to an excessive amount of unmanaged trees at risk falling in a storm.

High grading can also be a form of fraud on the owner of the trees. Indeed, stumpage rates (the amount paid per a certain volume of wood) are based on the average quality of the wood. By taking only the best timber, the wood cutter obtains wood more valuable than average at the price of average wood.

The opposite of this practice is low grading, where the lower quality trees are periodically harvested, making the genetic stock faster growing and of better timber quality. Such stems might well be taken by use of thinning methods as part of a thinning régime, especially via the thinning from below method.

== Fishing ==
High grading is a practice of selectively harvesting fish so that only the best quality fish are brought ashore. The practice is popular in situations under individual fishing quotas where only a limited number of fish are allowed to be harvested. Following the letter, but not the spirit of the law, fish are caught, and if not considered optimal, thrown back into the ocean. The practice of high grading allows fishers to get higher prices for their limited catch but is environmentally destructive because many of the fish returned to the water die. This was an issue with the EU regulation of fisheries. Hugh Fearnley-Whittingstall, a celebrity chef, led a campaign against this with a TV show called Hugh´s Fish Fight, which successfully lobbied for a change in EU law to reduce the waste (discards) from thrown back fish in sea fishery.

== Mining ==
In mining, high grading refers to mining out the portions of the orebody that has the highest grade of material to be mined. However, it may also refer to the concealment and theft of valuable gold or silver ore by miners for personal profit. Common in the United States in the late 19th century and early 20th century, high graders would usually conceal the highest grades of ore they encountered during their work day in a pocket or lunch pail, or within the body, and later attempt to fence it on the black market.

As mining companies became more aware of the growing problem, they built changing stations where they forced the miners to shower after their shift in the mines, making it easier to foil attempts at theft.

“HIGH GRADING AT TONOPAH.” The arrest of four men for high grading took place at Tonopah last Friday morning as the men were coming off shift at the McNamara mine. The men arrested are William Turner, vice president of the Tonopah miners' union; Tom Conifrey, Tom Cunningham and Patrick Flanigan. They were caught with the rich ore concealed upon their persons, and it is said that nearly a wagonload of ore was recovered from the residences of the high graders. These men have been suspected for a long time, and Friday morning the entire shift was held up and searched. All were lodged in the county jail, and two of them have since given bail. It is announced that they will be prosecuted to the full extent of the law.

— Rhyolite Herald, October 28, 1908

== See also ==
- Cherry picking (disambiguation)
- Ecoforestry
