= Cherry picker (disambiguation) =

A cherry picker is a platform for lifting someone to work at a high level.

Cherry picker may also refer to:

- An engine crane, a cantilevered tool for installing or removing the engine block from a vehicle
- Glenbuck Cherrypickers F.C., a former Scottish football club
- The Cherry Picker, a 1974 British drama film
- One who engages in suppressing evidence (cherry picking)
- Cherry picking (basketball), in sports, a player who remains near the opponents' goal
- Nickname of the 11th Hussars of the British Army
- Literally, a person picking cherries off a cherry tree

== See also ==
- Cherry picking (disambiguation)
