= Cherry picking (disambiguation) =

Cherry picking is the fallacy of selecting evidence that supports an argument while ignoring evidence that contradicts it.

Cherry picking may also refer to:

- Harvesting fruit from cherry trees
- Cherry picking (basketball), a strategy in basketball where a player stays near the opponents' goal rather than playing defense
- Cherry-picking tax avoidance, a form of tax avoidance in Australia in the 1970s and 1980s
- Cherry-picking, moving only some revisions from one branch to another in version control (software engineering)

== See also ==
- Cherry picker (disambiguation)
