= Income Tax Assessment Act 1997 =

Act of the Parliament of Australia

Parliament of Australia
- Long title: An Act about income tax and related matters
- Citation: No. 38 of 1997 or No. 38 of 1997 as amended
- Territorial extent: States and territories of Australia
- Assented to: 17 April 1997
- Status: In force

The Income Tax Assessment Act 1997 (Cth) is an Act of the Parliament of Australia introduced by the Howard government. The Act is one of a few statutes used in Australia to calculate income tax assessments. The Act was passed in an attempt to provide a rewritten income tax assessment statute, as the Income Tax Assessment Act 1936 was considered outdated. New matters relating to Australian income tax law are generally added to the Act, rather than the old 1936 Act.

== The Act ==
Issues addressed by the act include:

- Deductions for expenses incurred earning assessed income - s8(1)
- Deductions for management of tax affairs - s25(5)
- The definition of 'trading stock', including shares - s70(10)
- The capital gains tax
- A ban on deductions for expenses relating to illegally earned income - s26(54)

== See also ==
- Taxation in Australia
- Income tax in Australia
- Commissioner of Taxation v La Rosa
