= Dennis Mahoney =

American writer and artist

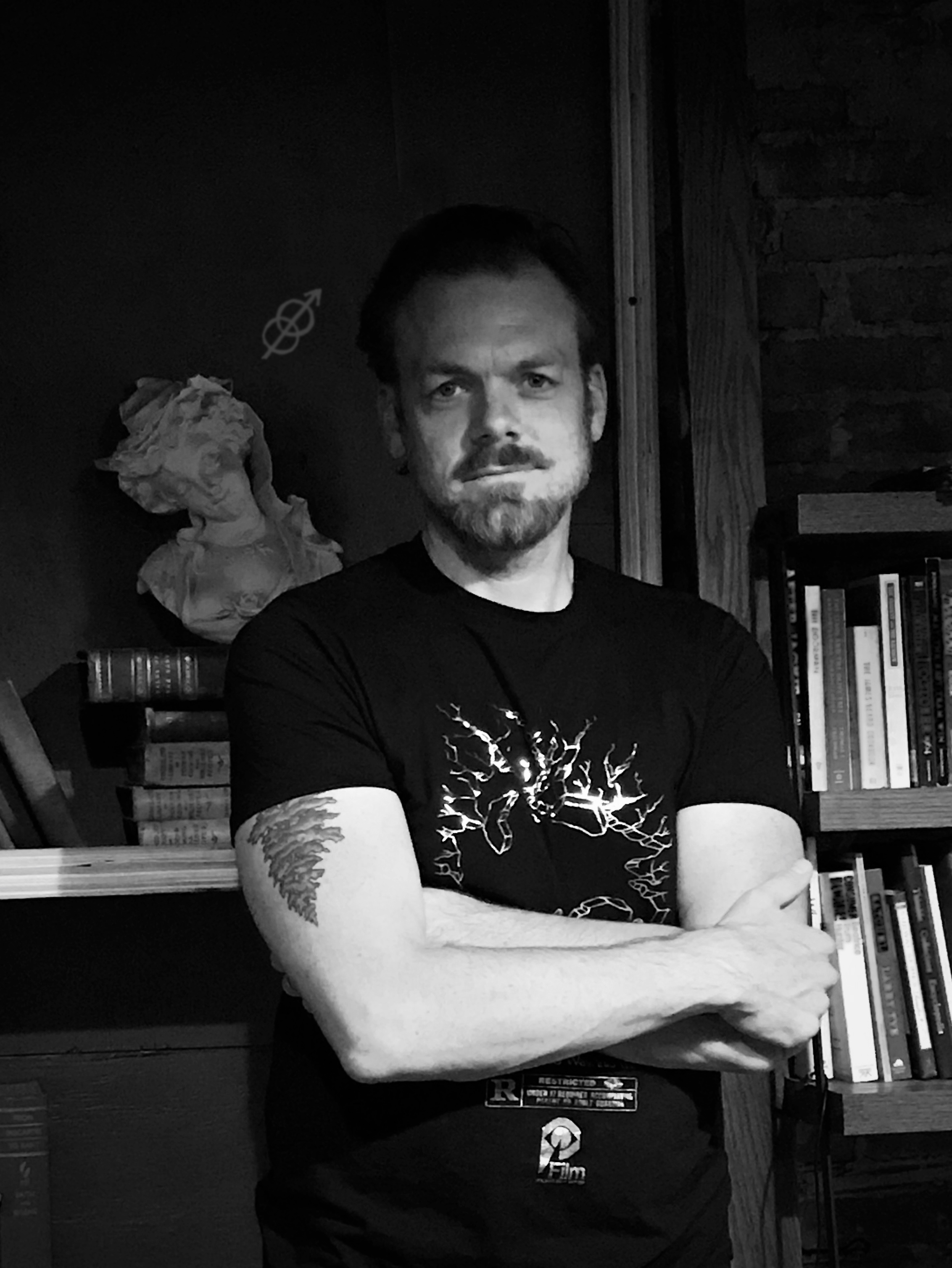
- Mahoney in 2020
- Born: October 2, 1974 (age 51); Troy, New York, U.S.
- Education: The College of Saint Rose
- Occupations: Writer; multimedia artist; podcast producer
- Website: www.equinoxsociety.com

Dennis Mahoney (born October 2, 1974) is an American writer and artist. He is the author of three novels and the creator of the multimedia project The Equinox Society.

== Books ==
Mahoney's debut novel Fellow Mortals (Farrar, Straus and Giroux, 2013) was a Barnes and Noble Discover Great New Writers Selection.

Bell Weather (Henry Holt & Co., 2015) was named an Indie Next Pick official selection and a Boston Globe Pick of the Week.

Mahoney's third novel, Ghostlove (Ig Publishing, 2020), was reviewed by The New York Times Book Review, Publishers Weekly, Library Journal, and The New York Journal of Books.

My Heart Is Full of Blood (Audible, 2022) is a collection of short stories concerning members of the Equinox Society. It was released as an Audible Original audio book featuring performer Sean Patrick Hopkins.

== Other works ==
Mahoney is the creator of the multimedia project The Equinox Society, and the writer and producer of Equinox Society Radio, a podcast of horror stories and occult themes.
