= Peter Hely =

Australian judge

Peter Hely (26 March 1944 – 1 October 2005) was a judge of the Federal Court of Australia.

Hely attended Sydney Boys High School from 1956 to 1960. The early part of Hely's legal career was spent working at the commercial bar in Sydney. Notable cases he was involved with during this time included the prosecution of nightclub owner Abe Saffron for tax fraud in 1987, and representing News Ltd during the Super League war of the 1990s, which concerned broadcasting rights for rugby league football. He was appointed to the Federal Court in 1998.

He died in Paris in 2005. The Law School of the University of Sydney has established a scholarship in his honour, to encourage postgraduate study in commercial law.
