= Keith Aickin =

Former Justice of the High Court of Australia

The Honourable Sir Keith Aickin KBE QC

Justice of the High Court of Australia
- In office 20 September 1976 – 18 June 1982
- Nominated by: Malcolm Fraser
- Appointed by: John Kerr
- Preceded by: Sir Edward McTiernan
- Succeeded by: Sir Daryl Dawson

Personal details
- Born: 1 February 1916 East Malvern, Victoria, Australia
- Died: 18 June 1982 (aged 66) South Melbourne, Victoria, Australia

Sir Keith Arthur Aickin (1 February 1916 – 18 June 1982) was an Australian judge who served on the High Court of Australia from 1976 until his death in 1982. He had previously been a prominent barrister.

== Early life and education ==
Aickin was born in Malvern East, Melbourne, the younger son of James Lee Aickin, a schoolmaster from Ireland, and his Victorian-born wife Edith Clarabel, née Knight. Keith Aickin was educated at Melbourne Grammar School and the University of Melbourne, where he graduated with a Bachelor of Laws with Honours and later a Master of Laws. He received the Supreme Court of Victoria's Prize in Law, and numerous other prizes and exhibitions. On 17 April 1952, Aickin married Elizabeth May Gullett at St John's Anglican Church, Toorak.

== Career ==
From 1939 to 1941, Aickin worked as an associate to High Court Justice (later Chief Justice) Owen Dixon. From 1942 to 1944, Aickin served as part of the Australian legation to Washington, D.C. (predecessor of the Embassy of Australia in Washington). In 1948, he joined the legal department of the United Nations in New York City, becoming a legal adviser.

On returning to Australia, Aickin lectured at the University of Melbourne, before being admitted to the Victorian Bar in 1949. He became one of Victoria's most prominent barristers, and in 1957 was made a Queen's Counsel. He was elected to the inaugural council of La Trobe University in 1966, and was also appointed to a number of company boards, including those of Mayne Nickless (1958), P&O Australia (1969), Comalco (1970), and BHP (1971). He resigned his directorships upon his appointment to the High Court in 1976.

== High Court ==
Aickin was appointed to the High Court on 20 September 1976, in place of Sir Edward McTiernan – retiring at the age of 84 after 45 years on the court. His appointment and McTiernan's retirement were announced by Attorney-General Bob Ellicott on the same day (10 September). As was traditional for High Court justices, he was knighted shortly after his appointment.

During his time on the court, Aickin developed a reputation as a judicial conservative on constitutional matters and a defender of states' rights, preferring to interpret Commonwealth powers more narrowly. One of his first important cases was Ansett Transport Industries (Operations) Pty Ltd v Commonwealth (1977), where he wrote the minority opinion supporting Ansett's attempt to hold the government to its Two Airlines Policy. Aickin did not frequently dissent, but a few months before his death was in the minority in Koowarta v Bjelke-Petersen, which upheld the Racial Discrimination Act 1975 as a valid exercise of the government's external affairs power.

== Car accident and death ==
On 4 June 1982, Aickin received severe injuries in a car accident in Melbourne, including six broken ribs. He spent several days in the intensive care unit at Prince Henry's Hospital, but was discharged and expected to recover; he took medical leave from the court. However, on 18 June he suffered a fatal heart attack related to his earlier injuries. Aickin's incapacity and subsequent death reduced the number of sitting High Court judges to five, as Ninian Stephen had recently resigned to become the Governor-General. It also meant there was no Victorian judge on the court for the first time in its history. On 30 July, the government announced that Aickin's replacement would be Daryl Dawson.
