= Income tax in Australia =

Form of taxation in Australia

Income tax in Australia is imposed by the federal government on the taxable income of individuals and corporations. State governments have not imposed income taxes since World War II. On individuals, income tax is levied at progressive rates, and at one of two rates for corporations. The income of partnerships and trusts is not taxed directly, but is taxed on its distribution to the partners or beneficiaries. Income tax is the most important source of revenue for government within the Australian taxation system. Income tax is collected on behalf of the federal government by the Australian Taxation Office.

The two statutes under which income tax is calculated are the Income Tax Assessment Act 1936 and the Income Tax Assessment Act 1997; the former is gradually being re-written into the latter. Taxable income is the difference between assessable income and allowable deductions. There are three main types of assessable income for individual taxpayers: personal earnings (such as salary and wages), business income and capital gains. Taxable income of individuals is taxed at progressive rates from 0 to 45%, plus a Medicare levy of 2%, while income derived by companies is taxed at either 30% or 25% depending on annual turnover, but is subject to dividend imputation. Generally, capital gains are only subject to tax at the time the gain is realised and are reduced by 50% if the capital asset sold was held for more than one year.

In Australia the financial year runs from 1 July to 30 June of the following year.

== History ==
The first income tax in Australia was imposed in 1884 by South Australia with a general tax on income.

Federal income tax was first introduced in 1915, as a wartime measure to help fund Australia's war effort in the First World War. Between 1915 and 1942, income taxes were levied by both state governments and the federal government. In 1942, to help fund World War II, the federal government took over the raising of all income tax, to the exclusion of the States. The loss of the states' ability to raise revenue by income taxation was offset by federal government grants to the states and, later, the devolution of the power to levy payroll taxes to the states in 1971.

In 1951, the top marginal tax rate for incomes above £10,000 (equivalent to $425,000 today) was 75 per cent. From 1955 until the mid-1980s the top marginal tax rate was 67 per cent.

=== Historical personal income tax rates and brackets ===
The following historical personal income tax rates and brackets since 1983 are sourced from the ATO. These rates do not include the Medicare levy. Income tax brackets in Australia are not typically indexed against inflation.

Marginal Tax Rates and Income Brackets for 1983–84

| Taxable income | Tax on this income | Effective tax rate |
|---|---|---|
| $1 – $4,594 | Nil | 0% |
| $4,595 – $19,499 | 30c for each $1 over $4,595 | 0 – 22.93% |
| $19,500 – $35,787 | $4,471.50 plus 46c for each $1 over $19,500 | 22.93 – 33.43% |
| $35,788 and over | $11,963.98 plus 60c for each $1 over $35,788 | 33.43 – less than 60% |

Marginal Tax Rates and Income Brackets for 1984–85

| Taxable income | Tax on this income | Effective tax rate |
|---|---|---|
| $1 – $4,594 | Nil | 0% |
| $4,595 – $12,499 | 26.67 cents for each $1 over $4,595 | 0 – 16.87% |
| $12,500 – $19,499 | $2,108.26 plus 30 cents for each $1 over $12,500 | 16.87 – 21.58% |
| $19,500 – $27,999 | $4,208.26 plus 46 cents for each $1 over $19,500 | 21.58 – 28.99% |
| $28,000 – $34,999 | $8,118.26 plus 47.33 cents for each $1 over $28,000 | 28.99 – 32.66% |
| $35,000 – $35,787 | $11,431.36 plus 55.33 cents for each $1 over $35,000 | 32.66 – 33.16% |
| $35,788 and over | $11,867.36 plus 60 cents for each $1 over $35,788 | 33.16 – less than 60% |

Marginal Tax Rates and Income Brackets for 1985–86

| Taxable income | Tax on this income | Effective tax rate |
|---|---|---|
| $1 – $4,594 | Nil | 0% |
| $4,595 – $12,499 | 25 cents for each $1 over $4,595 | 0 – 15.81% |
| $12,500 – $19,499 | $1,976.26 plus 30 cents for each $1 over $12,500 | 15.81 – 20.90% |
| $19,500 – $27,999 | $4,076.25 plus 46 cents for each $1 over $19,500 | 20.90 – 28.52% |
| $28,000 – $34,999 | $7,986.25 plus 48 cents for each $1 over $28,000 | 28.52 – 32.42% |
| $35,000 and over | $11,346.25 plus 60 cents for each $1 over $35,000 | 32.42 – less than 60% |

Marginal Tax Rates and Income Brackets for 1986–87

| Taxable income | Tax on this income | Effective tax rate |
|---|---|---|
| $1 – $4,889 | Nil | 0% |
| $4,890 – $12,499 | 24.42 cents for each $1 over $4,890 | 0 – 14.87% |
| $12,500 – $12,599 | $1,858.36 plus 26.50 cents for each $1 over $12,500 | 14.87 – 14.96% |
| $12,600 – $19,499 | $1,884.86 plus 29.42 cents for each $1 over $12,600 | 14.96 – 20.08% |
| $19,500 – $27,999 | $3,914.84 plus 44.25 cents for each $1 over $19,500 | 20.08 – 27.41% |
| $28,000 – $34,999 | $7,676.09 plus 46.83 cents for each $1 over $28,000 | 27.41 – 31.30% |
| $35,000 and over | $10,954.19 plus 57.08 cents for each $1 over $35,000 | 31.30 – less than 57.08% |

Marginal Tax Rates and Income Brackets for 1987–88

| Taxable income | Tax on this income | Effective tax rate |
|---|---|---|
| $1 – $5,100 | Nil | 0% |
| $5,101 – $12,600 | 24 cents for each $1 over $5,100 | 0 – 14.28% |
| $12,601 – $19,500 | $1,800 plus 29 cents for each $1 over $12,600 | 14.28 – 19.49% |
| $19,501 – $35,000 | $3,801 plus 40 cents for each $1 over $19,500 | 19.49 – 28.57% |
| $35,001 and over | $10,001 plus 49 cents for each $1 over $35,000 | 28.57 – less than 49% |

Marginal Tax Rates and Income Brackets for 1988–89

| Taxable income | Tax on this income | Effective tax rate |
|---|---|---|
| $1 – $5,100 | Nil | 0% |
| $5,101 – $12,600 | 24 cents for each $1 over $5,100 | 0 – 14.28% |
| $12,601 – $19,500 | $1,800 plus 29 cents for each $1 over $12,600 | 14.28 – 19.49% |
| $19,501 – $35,000 | $3,801 plus 40 cents for each $1 over $19,500 | 19.49 – 28.57% |
| $35,001 and over | $10,001 plus 49 cents for each $1 over $35,000 | 28.57 – less than 49% |

Marginal Tax Rates and Income Brackets for 1989–90

| Taxable income | Tax on this income | Effective tax rate |
|---|---|---|
| $1 – $5,099 | Nil | 0% |
| $5,100 – $17,649 | 21 cents for each $1 over $5,100 | 0 – 14.93% |
| $17,650 – $20,599 | $2,635.50 plus 29 cents for each $1 over $17,650 | 14.93 – 16.95% |
| $20,600 – $34,999 | $3,491 plus 39 cents for each $1 over $20,600 | 16.95 – 26.02% |
| $35,000 – $49,999 | $9,107 plus 47 cents for each $1 over $35,000 | 26.02 – 32.31% |
| $50,000 and over | $16,157 plus 48 cents for each $1 over $50,000 | 32.31 – less than 48% |

Marginal Tax Rates and Income Brackets for 1990–91

| Taxable income | Tax on this income | Effective tax rate |
|---|---|---|
| $1 – $5,249 | Nil | 0% |
| $5,250 – $17,649 | 20.5 cents for each $1 over $5,250 | 0 – 14.40% |
| $17,650 – $20,599 | $2,542 plus 24.5 cents for each $1 over $17,650 | 14.40 – 15.85% |
| $20,600 – $20,699 | $3,264.75 plus 29.5 cents for each $1 over $20,600 | 15.85 – 15.91% |
| $20,700 – $34,999 | $3,294.25 plus 38.5 cents for each $1 over $20,700 | 15.91 – 25.14% |
| $35,000 – 35,999 | $8,799.75 plus 42.5 cents for each $1 over $35,000 | 25.14 – 25.62% |
| $36,000 – 49,999 | $9,224.75 plus 46.5 cents for each $1 over $36,000 | 25.62 – 31.47% |
| $50,000 and over | $15,734.75 plus 47 cents for each $1 over $50,000 | 31.47 – less than 47% |

Marginal Tax Rates and Income Brackets for 1991–92

| Taxable income | Tax on this income | Effective tax rate |
|---|---|---|
| $1 – $5,400 | Nil | 0% |
| $5,401 – $20,700 | 20 cents for each $1 over $5,400 | 0 – 14.78% |
| $20,701 – $36,000 | $3,060 plus 38 cents for each $1 over $20,700 | 14.78 – 24.65% |
| $36,001 – $50,000 | $8,874 plus 46 cents for each $1 over $36,000 | 24.65 – 30.63% |
| $50,000 and over | $15,314 plus 47 cents for each $1 over $50,000 | 30.63 – less than 47% |

Marginal Tax Rates and Income Brackets for 1992–93

| Taxable income | Tax on this income | Effective tax rate |
|---|---|---|
| $1 – $5,400 | Nil | 0% |
| $5,401 – $20,700 | 20 cents for each $1 over $5,400 | 0 – 14.78% |
| $20,701 – $36,000 | $3,060 plus 38 cents for each $1 over $20,700 | 14.78 – 24.65% |
| $36,001 – $50,000 | $8,874 plus 46 cents for each $1 over $36,000 | 24.65 – 30.63% |
| $50,000 and over | $15,314 plus 47 cents for each $1 over $50,000 | 30.63 – less than 47% |

Marginal Tax Rates and Income Brackets for 1993–94

| Taxable income | Tax on this income | Effective tax rate |
|---|---|---|
| $1 – $5,400 | Nil | 0% |
| $5,401 – $20,700 | 20 cents for each $1 over $5,400 | 0 – 14.78% |
| $20,701 – $36,000 | $3,060 plus 35.5 cents for each $1 over $20,700 | 14.78 – 23.59% |
| $36,001 – $38,000 | $8,491.50 plus 38.5 cents for each $1 over $36,000 | 23.59 – 24.37% |
| $38,001 – $50,000 | $9,261.50 plus 44.125 cents for each $1 over $38,000 | 24.37 – 29.11% |
| $50,001 and over | $14,556.50 plus 47 cents for each $1 over $50,000 | 29.11 – less than 47% |

Marginal Tax Rates and Income Brackets for 1994–95

| Taxable income | Tax on this income | Effective tax rate |
|---|---|---|
| $1 – $5,400 | Nil | 0% |
| $5,401 – $20,700 | 20 cents for each $1 over $5,400 | 0 – 14.78% |
| $20,701 – $38,000 | $3,060 plus 34 cents for each $1 over $20,700 | 14.78 – 23.53% |
| $38,001 – $50,000 | $8,942 plus 43 cents for each $1 over $38,000 | 23.53 – 28.20% |
| $50,001 and over | $14,102 plus 47 cents for each $1 over $50,000 | 28.20 – less than 47% |

Marginal Tax Rates and Income Brackets for 1995–96

| Taxable income | Tax on this income | Effective tax rate |
|---|---|---|
| $1 – $5,400 | Nil | 0% |
| $5,401 – $20,700 | 20 cents for each $1 over $5,400 | 0 – 14.78% |
| $20,701 – $38,000 | $3,060 plus 34 cents for each $1 over $20,700 | 14.78 – 23.53% |
| $38,001 – $50,000 | $8,942 plus 43 cents for each $1 over $38,000 | 23.53 – 28.20% |
| $50,001 and over | $14,102 plus 47 cents for each $1 over $50,000 | 28.20 – less than 47% |

Marginal Tax Rates and Income Brackets for 1996–97

| Taxable income | Tax on this income | Effective tax rate |
|---|---|---|
| $1 – $5,400 | Nil | 0% |
| $5,401 – $20,700 | 20 cents for each $1 over $5,400 | 0 – 14.78% |
| $20,701 – $38,000 | $3,060 plus 34 cents for each $1 over $20,700 | 14.78 – 23.53% |
| $38,001 – $50,000 | $8,942 plus 43 cents for each $1 over $38,000 | 23.53 – 28.20% |
| $50,001 and over | $14,102 plus 47 cents for each $1 over $50,000 | 28.20 – less than 47% |

Marginal Tax Rates and Income Brackets for 1997–98

| Taxable income | Tax on this income | Effective tax rate |
|---|---|---|
| $1 – $5,400 | Nil | 0% |
| $5,401 – $20,700 | 20 cents for each $1 over $5,400 | 0 – 14.78% |
| $20,701 – $38,000 | $3,060 plus 34 cents for each $1 over $20,700 | 14.78 – 23.53% |
| $38,001 – $50,000 | $8,942 plus 43 cents for each $1 over $38,000 | 23.53 – 28.20% |
| $50,001 and over | $14,102 plus 47 cents for each $1 over $50,000 | 28.20 – less than 47% |

Marginal Tax Rates and Income Brackets for 1998–99

| Taxable income | Tax on this income | Effective tax rate |
|---|---|---|
| $1 – $5,400 | Nil | 0% |
| $5,401 – $20,700 | 20 cents for each $1 over $5,400 | 0 – 14.78% |
| $20,701 – $38,000 | $3,060 plus 34 cents for each $1 over $20,700 | 14.78 – 23.53% |
| $38,001 – $50,000 | $8,942 plus 43 cents for each $1 over $38,000 | 23.53 – 28.20% |
| $50,001 and over | $14,102 plus 47 cents for each $1 over $50,000 | 28.20 – less than 47% |

Marginal Tax Rates and Income Brackets for 1999–2000

| Taxable income | Tax on this income | Effective tax rate |
|---|---|---|
| $1 – $5,400 | Nil | 0% |
| $5,401 – $20,700 | 20 cents for each $1 over $5,400 | 0 – 14.78% |
| $20,701 – $38,000 | $3,060 plus 34 cents for each $1 over $20,700 | 14.78 – 23.53% |
| $38,001 – $50,000 | $8,942 plus 43 cents for each $1 over $38,000 | 23.53 – 28.20% |
| $50,001 and over | $14,102 plus 47 cents for each $1 over $50,000 | 28.20 – less than 47% |

Marginal Tax Rates and Income Brackets for 2000–01

| Taxable income | Tax on this income | Effective tax rate |
|---|---|---|
| $1 – $6,000 | Nil | 0% |
| $6,001 – $20,000 | 17 cents for each $1 over $6,000 | 0 – 11.9% |
| $20,001 – $50,000 | $2,380 plus 30 cents for each $1 over $20,000 | 11.9 – 22.76% |
| $50,001 – $60,000 | $11,380 plus 42 cents for each $1 over $50,000 | 22.76 – 25.97% |
| $60,001 and over | $15,580 plus 47 cents for each $1 over $60,000 | 25.97 – less than 47% |

Marginal Tax Rates and Income Brackets for 2001–02

| Taxable income | Tax on this income | Effective tax rate |
|---|---|---|
| $1 – $6,000 | Nil | 0% |
| $6,001 – $20,000 | 17 cents for each $1 over $6,000 | 0 – 11.9% |
| $20,001 – $50,000 | $2,380 plus 30 cents for each $1 over $20,000 | 11.9 – 22.76% |
| $50,001 – $60,000 | $11,380 plus 42 cents for each $1 over $50,000 | 22.76 – 25.97% |
| $60,001 and over | $15,580 plus 47 cents for each $1 over $60,000 | 25.97 – less than 47% |

Marginal Tax Rates and Income Brackets for 2002–03

| Taxable income | Tax on this income | Effective tax rate |
|---|---|---|
| $1 – $6,000 | Nil | 0% |
| $6,001 – $20,000 | 17 cents for each $1 over $6,000 | 0 – 11.9% |
| $20,001 – $50,000 | $2,380 plus 30 cents for each $1 over $20,000 | 11.9 – 22.76% |
| $50,001 – $60,000 | $11,380 plus 42 cents for each $1 over $50,000 | 22.76 – 25.97% |
| $60,001 and over | $15,580 plus 47 cents for each $1 over $60,000 | 25.97 – less than 47% |

Marginal Tax Rates and Income Brackets for 2003–04

| Taxable income | Tax on this income | Effective tax rate |
|---|---|---|
| $1 – $6,000 | Nil | 0% |
| $6,001 – $21,600 | 17 cents for each $1 over $6,000 | 0 – 12.28% |
| $21,601 – $52,000 | $2,652 plus 30 cents for each $1 over $21,600 | 12.28 – 22.64% |
| $52,001 – $62,500 | $11,772 plus 42 cents for each $1 over $52,000 | 22.64 – 25.89% |
| $62,501 and over | $16,182 plus 47 cents for each $1 over $62,500 | 25.89 – less than 47% |

Marginal Tax Rates and Income Brackets for 2004–05

| Taxable income | Tax on this income | Effective tax rate |
|---|---|---|
| $1 – $6,000 | Nil | 0% |
| $6,001 – $21,600 | 17 cents for each $1 over $6,000 | 0 – 12.28% |
| $21,601 – $58,000 | $2,652 plus 30 cents for each $1 over $21,600 | 12.28 – 23.4% |
| $58,001 – $70,000 | $13,572 plus 42 cents for each $1 over $58,000 | 23.4 – 26.59% |
| $70,000 and over | $18,612 plus 47 cents for each $1 over $70,000 | 26.59 – less than 47% |

Marginal Tax Rates and Income Brackets for 2005–06

| Taxable income | Tax on this income | Effective tax rate |
|---|---|---|
| $1 – $6,000 | Nil | 0% |
| $6,001 – $21,600 | 15c for each $1 over $6,000 | 0 – 10.83% |
| $21,601 – $63,000 | $2,340 plus 30c for each $1 over $21,600 | 10.83 – 23.43% |
| $63,001 – $95,000 | $14,760 plus 42c for each $1 over $63,000 | 23.43 – 29.68% |
| $95,000 and over | $28,200 plus 47c for each $1 over $95,000 | 29.68 – less than 47% |

Marginal Tax Rates and Income Brackets for 2006–07

| Taxable income | Tax on this income | Effective tax rate |
|---|---|---|
| $1 – $6,000 | Nil | 0% |
| $6,001 – $25,000 | 15c for each $1 over $6,000 | 0 – 11.40% |
| $25,001 – $75,000 | $2,850 plus 30c for each $1 over $25,000 | 11.40 – 23.80% |
| $75,001 – $150,000 | $17,850 plus 40c for each $1 over $75,000 | 23.80 – 31.90% |
| $150,001 and over | $47,850 plus 45c for each $1 over $150,000 | 31.90 – less than 45% |

Marginal Tax Rates and Income Brackets for 2007–08

| Taxable income | Tax on this income | Effective tax rate |
|---|---|---|
| $1 – $6,000 | Nil | 0% |
| $6,001 – $30,000 | 15c for each $1 over $6,000 | 0 – 12.00% |
| $30,001 – $75,000 | $3,600 plus 30c for each $1 over $30,000 | 12.00 – 22.80% |
| $75,001 – $150,000 | $17,100 plus 40c for each $1 over $75,000 | 22.80 – 31.40% |
| $150,001 and over | $47,100 plus 45c for each $1 over $150,000 | 31.40 – less than 45% |

Marginal Tax Rates and Income Brackets for 2008–09

| Taxable income | Tax on this income | Effective tax rate |
|---|---|---|
| $1 – $6,000 | Nil | 0% |
| $6,001 – $34,000 | 15c for each $1 over $6,000 | 0 – 12.35% |
| $34,001 – $80,000 | $4,200 plus 30c for each $1 over $34,000 | 12.35 – 22.50% |
| $80,001 – $180,000 | $18,000 plus 40c for each $1 over $80,000 | 22.50 – 32.22% |
| $180,001 and over | $58,000 plus 45c for each $1 over $180,000 | 32.22 – less than 45% |

Marginal Tax Rates and Income Brackets for 2009–10

| Taxable income | Tax on this income | Effective tax rate |
|---|---|---|
| $1 – $6,000 | Nil | 0% |
| $6,001 – $35,000 | 15c for each $1 over $6,000 | 0 – 12.43% |
| $35,001 – $80,000 | $4,350 plus 30c for each $1 over $35,000 | 12.43 – 22.31% |
| $80,001 – $180,000 | $17,850 plus 38c for each $1 over $80,000 | 22.31 – 31.03% |
| $180,001 and over | $55,850 plus 45c for each $1 over $180,000 | 31.03 – less than 45% |

Marginal Tax Rates and Income Brackets for 2010–11

| Taxable income | Tax on this income | Effective tax rate |
|---|---|---|
| $1 – $6,000 | Nil | 0% |
| $6,001 – $37,000 | 15c for each $1 over $6,000 | 0 – 12.57% |
| $37,001 – $80,000 | $4,650 plus 30c for each $1 over $37,000 | 12.57 – 21.94% |
| $80,001 – $180,000 | $17,550 plus 37c for each $1 over $80,000 | 21.94 – 30.30% |
| $180,001 and over | $54,550 plus 45c for each $1 over $180,000 | 30.30 – less than 45% |

Marginal Tax Rates and Income Brackets for 2011–12

| Taxable income | Tax on this income | Effective tax rate |
|---|---|---|
| $1 – $6,000 | Nil | 0% |
| $6,001 – $37,000 | 15c for each $1 over $6,000 | 0 – 12.57% |
| $37,001 – $80,000 | $4,650 plus 30c for each $1 over $37,000 | 12.57 – 21.94% |
| $80,001 – $180,000 | $17,550 plus 37c for each $1 over $80,000 | 21.94 – 30.30% |
| $180,001 and over | $54,550 plus 45c for each $1 over $180,000 | 30.30 – less than 45% |

In addition, the flood levy, introduced by the Gillard Labor government as a result of the 2010–11 Queensland floods, applied.

Marginal Tax Rates and Income Brackets for 2012–13

| Taxable income | Tax on this income | Effective tax rate |
|---|---|---|
| $1 – $18,200 | Nil | 0% |
| $18,201 – $37,000 | 19c for each $1 over $18,200 | 0 – 9.65% |
| $37,001 – $80,000 | $3,572 plus 32.5c for each $1 over $37,000 | 9.65 – 21.93% |
| $80,001 – $180,000 | $17,547 plus 37c for each $1 over $80,000 | 21.93 – 30.30% |
| $180,001 and over | $54,547 plus 45c for each $1 over $180,000 | 30.30 – less than 45% |

Marginal Tax Rates and Income Brackets for 2013–14

| Taxable income | Tax on this income | Effective tax rate |
|---|---|---|
| $1 – $18,200 | Nil | 0% |
| $18,201 – $37,000 | 19c for each $1 over $18,200 | 0 – 9.65% |
| $37,001 – $80,000 | $3,572 plus 32.5c for each $1 over $37,000 | 9.65 – 21.93% |
| $80,001 – $180,000 | $17,547 plus 37c for each $1 over $80,000 | 21.93 – 30.30% |
| $180,001 and over | $54,547 plus 45c for each $1 over $180,000 | 30.30 – less than 45% |

Marginal Tax Rates and Income Brackets for 2014–15

| Taxable income | Tax on this income | Effective tax rate |
|---|---|---|
| $1 – $18,200 | Nil | 0% |
| $18,201 – $37,000 | 19c for each $1 over $18,200 | 0 – 9.65% |
| $37,001 – $80,000 | $3,572 plus 32.5c for each $1 over $37,000 | 9.65 – 21.93% |
| $80,001 – $180,000 | $17,547 plus 37c for each $1 over $80,000 | 21.93 – 30.30% |
| $180,001 and over | $54,547 plus 45c for each $1 over $180,000 | 30.30 – less than 45% |

In addition, the Temporary Budget Repair Levy, introduced by the Abbott Liberal government, was payable at a rate of 2% for taxable incomes over $180,000.

Marginal Tax Rates and Income Brackets for 2015–16

| Taxable income | Tax on this income | Effective tax rate |
|---|---|---|
| $1 – $18,200 | Nil | 0% |
| $18,201 – $37,000 | 19c for each $1 over $18,200 | 0 – 9.65% |
| $37,001 – $80,000 | $3,572 plus 32.5c for each $1 over $37,000 | 9.65 – 21.93% |
| $80,001 – $180,000 | $17,547 plus 37c for each $1 over $80,000 | 21.93 – 30.30% |
| $180,001 and over | $54,547 plus 45c for each $1 over $180,000 | 30.30 – less than 45% |

In addition, the Temporary Budget Repair Levy was payable at a rate of 2% for taxable incomes over $180,000.

Marginal Tax Rates and Income Brackets for 2016–17

| Taxable income | Tax on this income | Effective tax rate |
|---|---|---|
| $1 – $18,200 | N/A | 0% |
| $18,201 – $37,000 | 19c for each $1 over $18,200 | 0 – 9.65% |
| $37,001 – $87,000 | $3,572 plus 32.5c for each $1 over $37,000 | 9.65 – 22.78% |
| $87,001 – $180,000 | $19,822 plus 37c for each $1 over $87,000 | 22.78 – 30.13% |
| $180,001 and over | $54,232 plus 45c for each $1 over $180,000 | 30.13 – less than 45% |

In addition, the Temporary Budget Repair Levy was payable at a rate of 2% for taxable incomes over $180,000, and expired on 1 July 2017.
In October 2016, the federal government passed a bracket adjustment that raised the third marginal tax rate threshold from $80,000 to $87,000. These changes took effect from 1 July 2016.

Marginal Tax Rates and Income Brackets for 2017–18

| Taxable income | Tax on this income | Effective tax rate |
|---|---|---|
| $1 – $18,200 | Nil | 0% |
| $18,201 – $37,000 | 19c for each $1 over $18,200 | 0 – 9.65% |
| $37,001 – $87,000 | $3,572 plus 32.5c for each $1 over $37,000 | 9.65 – 22.78% |
| $87,001 – $180,000 | $19,822 plus 37c for each $1 over $87,000 | 22.78 – 30.13% |
| $180,001 and over | $54,232 plus 45c for each $1 over $180,000 | 30.13 – less than 45% |

The temporary budget repair levy, which was introduced by the Liberal–National coalition Government under Prime Minister Abbott in financial year 2014/15 and payable at a rate of 2% for incomes over $180,000, ceased to apply on 1 July 2017.

Marginal Tax Rates and Income Brackets for 2018–19

| Taxable income | Tax on this portion of income | Effective overall tax rate |
|---|---|---|
| $1 – $18,200 | Nil | 0% |
| $18,201 – $37,000 | 19c for each $1 over $18,200 | 0 – 9.65% |
| $37,001 – $90,000 | $3,572 plus 32.5c for each $1 over $37,000 | 9.65 – 23.11% |
| $90,001 – $180,000 | $20,797 plus 37c for each $1 over $90,000 | 23.11 – 30.05% |
| $180,001 and over | $54,097 plus 45c for each $1 over $180,000 | 30.05 – less than 45% |

Part of stage two of the tax cuts the Turnbull Liberal Government had begun to take effect - see Stage three tax cuts

Marginal Tax Rates and Income Brackets for 2019–20

| Taxable income | Tax on this portion of income | Effective overall tax rate |
|---|---|---|
| $1 – $18,200 | Nil | 0% |
| $18,201 – $37,000 | 19c for each $1 over $18,200 | 0 – 9.65% |
| $37,001 – $90,000 | $3,572 plus 32.5c for each $1 over $37,000 | 9.65 – 23.11% |
| $90,001 – $180,000 | $20,797 plus 37c for each $1 over $90,000 | 23.11 – 30.05% |
| $180,001 and over | $54,097 plus 45c for each $1 over $180,000 | 30.05 – less than 45% |

Marginal Tax Rates and Income Brackets for 2020–21

| Taxable income | Tax on this portion of income | Effective overall tax rate |
|---|---|---|
| $1 – $18,200 | Nil | 0% |
| $18,201 – $45,000 | 19c for each $1 over $18,200 | 0 – 11.32% |
| $45,001 – $120,000 | $5,092 plus 32.5c for each $1 over $45,000 | 11.32 – 24.56% |
| $120,001 – $180,000 | $29,467 plus 37c for each $1 over $120,000 | 24.56 – 28.70% |
| $180,001 and over | $51,667 plus 45c for each $1 over $180,000 | 28.70 – less than 45% |

Further changes to the threshold for the 32.5c and 37c bracket were made in 2019 by the Morrison Liberal Government, increasing the threshold for the marginal 32.5% rate to $45,001 (previously $37,001, initially legislated to be $41,001), and bringing the changes forward to 2020 (instead of 2022) (see Stage three tax cuts)

Marginal Tax Rates and Income Brackets for 2021–22

| Taxable income | Tax on this portion of income | Effective overall tax rate |
|---|---|---|
| $1 – $18,200 | Nil | 0% |
| $18,201 – $45,000 | 19c for each $1 over $18,200 | 0 – 11.32% |
| $45,001 – $120,000 | $5,092 plus 32.5c for each $1 over $45,000 | 11.32 – 24.56% |
| $120,001 – $180,000 | $29,467 plus 37c for each $1 over $120,000 | 24.56 – 28.70% |
| $180,001 and over | $51,667 plus 45c for each $1 over $180,000 | 28.70 – less than 45% |

Marginal Tax Rates and Income Brackets for 2022–23

| Taxable income | Tax on this portion of income | Effective overall tax rate |
|---|---|---|
| $1 – $18,200 | Nil | 0% |
| $18,201 – $45,000 | 19c for each $1 over $18,200 | 0 – 11.32% |
| $45,001 – $120,000 | $5,092 plus 32.5c for each $1 over $45,000 | 11.32 – 24.56% |
| $120,001 – $180,000 | $29,467 plus 37c for each $1 over $120,000 | 24.56 – 28.70% |
| $180,001 and over | $51,667 plus 45c for each $1 over $180,000 | 28.70 – less than 45% |

Marginal Tax Rates and Income Brackets for 2023–24

| Taxable income | Tax on this portion of income | Effective overall tax rate |
|---|---|---|
| $1 – $18,200 | Nil | 0% |
| $18,201 – $45,000 | 19c for each $1 over $18,200 | 0 – 11.32% |
| $45,001 – $120,000 | $5,092 plus 32.5c for each $1 over $45,000 | 11.32 – 24.56% |
| $120,001 – $180,000 | $29,467 plus 37c for each $1 over $120,000 | 24.56 – 28.70% |
| $180,001 and over | $51,667 plus 45c for each $1 over $180,000 | 28.70 – less than 45% |

Marginal Tax Rates and Income Brackets for 2024–25

| Taxable income | Tax on this portion of income | Effective overall tax rate |
|---|---|---|
| $1 – $18,200 | Nil | 0% |
| $18,201 – $45,000 | 16c for each $1 over $18,200 | 0 – 9.53% |
| $45,001 – $135,000 | $4,288 plus 30c for each $1 over $45,000 | 9.53 – 23.18% |
| $135,001 – $190,000 | $31,288 plus 37c for each $1 over $135,000 | 23.18 – 27.18% |
| $190,001 and over | $51,638 plus 45c for each $1 over $190,000 | 27.18 – less than 45% |

The amended Stage three tax cuts, initially legislated by the Turnbull Liberal Government modified by the Morrison Liberal Government, and substantially changed by the Albanese Labor Government are set to take effect in this financial year

== Personal income tax ==
Income tax on personal income is a progressive tax. The rates for resident individual taxpayers are different from those for non-resident taxpayers (see below). The current tax-free threshold for resident people is $18,200, and the highest marginal rate for individuals is 45%. In addition, most Australians are liable to pay the Medicare levy, of which the standard is 2% of taxable income.

As with many other countries, income tax is withheld from wages and salaries in Australia, often resulting in refunds payable to taxpayers. An employee must quote to employers their Tax File Number (TFN) so the employer can withhold tax from their pay. While it is not an offence to fail to provide an employer, a bank or financial institution with a TFN, in the absence of this number, payers are required to withhold tax at the rate of 47% (the highest marginal rate plus Medicare levy) from the first dollar. Likewise, banks must also withhold the highest marginal rate of income tax on interest earned on bank accounts if the individual does not provide them with a TFN. In the same way, corporate and business taxpayers are required to provide their TFN or Australian Business Number (ABN) to the bank, otherwise the bank is required to withhold income tax at the highest rate of tax.

=== Individual income tax rates (residents) ===
Financial year 2026–27

The rates for residents are:

| Income over (AUD) | Tax rate | Effective overall tax rate |
|---|---|---|
| $0 | 0% | 0% |
| $18,200 | 15% | 0% - 8.9% |
| $45,000 | 30% | 8.9% – 23.0% |
| $135,000 | 37% | 23.0% – 27.0% |
| $190,000 | 45% | 27.0% – 45% |

The above rates do not include the Medicare levy of 2%

=== Medicare levy ===
When Medicare was introduced by the Hawke Labor government in February 1984, it was accompanied by a Medicare levy to help fund it. The levy was set at 1% of personal taxable income and applied to all but the lowest income-earning tax-payers. The levy was later increased to 1.25% in December 1986 to further cover rising medical costs. Low income earner threshold exemptions were also increased.

The Medicare levy was raised again by the Keating Labor government in July 1993, up to 1.4% of income, again to fund additional healthcare spending outlays. The low income earner exemption thresholds were also raised. In July 1995, two years later the Keating Labor government raised the levy to 1.5%, to offset a decline in Medicare levy receipts. The low income exemption thresholds were increased, again.

The standard Medicare levy was left at 1.5% in the following years since July 1993 until the Gillard Labor government announced in May 2013 that it would be increased to 2% on 1 July 2014 to fund the National Disability Insurance Scheme. The Labor government was not re-elected in September 2013, but the Medicare levy increase went ahead as scheduled in July 2014. In May 2017, Turnbull's Liberal–National coalition Government announced that from 1 July 2019, the Medicare levy will increase from 2% to 2.5% to fully fund the National Disability Insurance Scheme. This increase was abandoned in April 2018.

| Medicare Levy Rate | Period |
|---|---|
| 1.00% | February 1984 – November 1986 |
| 1.25% | December 1986 – June 1993 |
| 1.40% | July 1993 – June 1995 |
| 1.50% | July 1995 – June 2014 |
| 2.00% | July 2014 – current |

=== Tax Offset ===
A tax offset is a reduction in the amount of tax an eligible taxpayer owes in a given income year. The Australian Taxation Office (ATO) offers various tax offsets to provide targeted assistance to different groups of taxpayers, encouraging certain behaviours or helping those in specific situations.

=== Low income tax offset ===
The low income tax offset (LITO) is a tax rebate for Australian-resident individuals on lower incomes. Since 2012–13, the maximum amount of LITO is $445, and the offset cuts out when taxable income reaches $66,667. The LITO reduces an individual's tax liability but is not refundable when the liability reaches zero, and does not reduce the Medicare levy. The LITO is not used in calculating PAYG rates, but is calculated automatically by the ATO when a tax return is lodged.

| Taxable income | Low income tax offset (until 2021–22) |
|---|---|
| $18,200 – $37,000 | $445 |
| $37,001 – $66,667 | $445 minus 1.5c for every $1 above $37,000 |
| $66,668 and over | $0 |

The maximum LITO will be increased to $700 for the 2022–23 income year and onwards. The new LITO will also replace the temporary Low and Middle Income Tax Offset (LMITO) which is available only until the 2021–22 income year.

| Taxable income | Low income tax offset (from 2022 to 2023) |
|---|---|
| $18,200 – $37,000 | $700 |
| $37,001 – $45,000 | $700 minus 5c for every $1 above $37,000 |
| $45,001 – $66,667 | $325 minus 1.5c for every $1 above $45,000 |
| $66,668 and over | $0 |

=== Low and middle income tax offset ===
The low and middle income tax offset (LMITO) is a separate and temporary tax rebate introduced by the Morrison government in July 2019 and is available for the 2018–19, 2019–20, 2020–21 and 2021–22 income years only. The maximum amount of LMITO is $1,080, and the offset cuts out when taxable income reaches $126,000. Like the LITO, the offset is not refundable when the liability reaches zero, and does not reduce the Medicare levy. It is also not used in calculating PAYG rates, but is calculated automatically by the ATO when a tax return is lodged.

| Taxable income | Low and middle income tax offset (until 2021–22) |
|---|---|
| $18,200 – $37,000 | $255 |
| $37,001 – $48,000 | $255 plus 7.5c for every $1 above $37,000, up to a maximum of $1,080 |
| $48,001 – $90,000 | $1,080 |
| $90,001 – $126,000 | $1,080 minus 3c for every $1 above $90,000 |
| $126,001 and over | $0 |

=== Income tax for minors ===
Individuals under 18 years of age are taxed differently from adults. This rate does not apply to "excepted" income, which includes employment income and inheritances.

| Taxable income | Tax on this income | Effective Tax Rate |
|---|---|---|
| $1 – $417 | Nil | 0% |
| $417 – $1,307 | 65c for each $1 over $416 | 0 – 45% |
| $1,308 and over | 45% of total income | 45% |

=== Individual income tax rates (non-residents) ===
Financial year 2018–19

| Taxable income | Tax on this income | Effective tax rate |
|---|---|---|
| $1 – $90,000 | 32.5c for each $1 | 32.5% |
| $90,001 – $180,000 | $29,250 plus 37c for each $1 over $90,000 | 32.5 – 34.8% |
| $180,001 and over | $62,550 plus 45c for each $1 over $180,000 | 34.8 – less than 45% |

The Medicare levy does not apply to non-residents, and a non-resident is not entitled to the low income tax offset.

For prior tax years, see Tax rates – foreign resident.

=== Collection ===
Income tax on wages is collected by means of a withholding tax system known as Pay-as-you-go (PAYG). For employees with only a single job, the level of taxation at the end of the year is close to the amount due, before deductions are applied. Discrepancies and deduction amounts are declared in the annual income tax return and will be part of the refund which follows after annual assessment, or alternatively reduce the taxation debt that may be payable after assessment.

=== Share of taxes Paid by Income Groups ===
The progressive nature of income tax in Australia results in different income groups paying different amounts. The top 1% of income earners pay 18% of income tax received. The top 3% pay 28% of income tax. The top 10% of earners paid 46% of all income tax paid. The bottom 50% of earners paid 11% of all income tax.

== Company tax ==
The profit of Australian companies have since 2001 been taxed at a flat company tax rate of 30%.

Since 1987, dividends paid by Australian companies are subject to the Australian dividend imputation system, under which Australian-resident shareholders who receive a dividend from an Australian company that has paid Australian company tax is entitled to claim a tax credit (called a franking credit) on the company tax imputed or associated with the dividend, as declared by the company. The franking credits associated with such dividends is a tax credit against the shareholder's tax liability. Such dividends are called "franked dividends", and "unfranked dividends" are dividends which do not have any associated "imputation credits". Initially, in 1987, excess franking credits over the tax liability were lost, but since 2000, such excess credits have been refundable.

Non-resident shareholders are not entitled to claim a tax credit or refund of imputation credits. Unfranked dividends received by non-residents are subject to a withholding tax, which does not apply to franked dividends.

From 2015 to 2016, designated "small business entities" with an aggregated annual turnover threshold of less than $2 million were eligible for a lower tax rate of 28.5%. Since 1 July 2016, small business entities with aggregated annual turnover of less than $10 million have had a reduced company tax rate of 27.5%. Additionally, the Australian Government announced that from 2017 to 2018, corporate entities eligible for the lower tax rate will be known as "base rate entities". The small business definition will remain at $10 million from 2017 to 2018 onwards, however the base rate entity threshold (the aggregated annual turnover threshold under which entities will be eligible to pay a lower tax rate) will continue to rise.

== Capital gains tax ==
Capital gains tax (CGT) in Australia is part of the income tax system rather than a separate tax. Capital gains tax was introduced by the Hawke Labor government in September 1985 and allowed for indexation of the cost base of the capital asset to the Consumer Price Index, to account for annual price inflation.

Net capital gains (after concessions are applied) are included in a taxpayer's taxable income and are taxed at marginal rates. Capital gains applies to individuals, companies and any other entity which can legally own an asset. Trusts usually pass on their CGT liability to their beneficiaries. Partners are taxed separately on the CGT made by partnerships.

In 1999, Howard's Liberal–National coalition Government legislated to end the practice of cost base indexation (using the Consumer Price Index) on capital gains as a result of purchases made after 11.45am (by legal time in the ACT) on 21 September 1999. This simplified calculation of capital gains and losses.

The Government under Prime Minister Howard replaced cost base indexation with the allowance for a simple discount to apply to gains on capital assets held for more than twelve months (one year). The discount is 50% for individuals, and 33 ⅓% for complying superannuation funds.

Due to this change in calculation of capital gains, capital gains tax can now be owed because of inflation, even when no gain in purchasing power was achieved. However, in some cases where an indexed cost base applies (where an asset was acquired before 11.45am (by legal time in the ACT) on 21 September 1999) applying the old indexation rules gives a better tax result.

Capital gains realised by companies are not discounted. Capital gains made by trust structures are usually taxed as if they were made in the hands of the ultimate beneficiary, though there are exceptions.

The disposal of assets which have been held since before 20 September 1985 (when capital gains tax went into effect), are exempt from CGT.

== Legal framework ==
Income tax is payable on assessable income, which falls under two broad categories: ordinary income (Income Tax Assessment Act 1997 (Cth) s 6–5)(ITAA97) and statutory income. (cite references)

=== Ordinary income ===
Ordinary income requires a benefit in money or money's worth. This can include for example the reduction in an existing liability. There must be a nexus with an income earning activity, such as income from personal exertion, from a profit making activity or from investment or property. In addition receipts that are of a capital nature, voluntary income and gifts are not classified as ordinary income.

Normal or ordinary proceeds from a business activity are classified as ordinary income. A business includes any profession, trade, employment, vocation or calling, but does not include occupation as an employee. Activities of a commercial nature that are carried on regularly and in an organised, systematic way, on a large scale or with view to profit will generally be considered to be a business activity. An activity which is not a business activity is more likely to be a hobby and income is not taxable. Other examples of business activities include illegal activities such as burglary, smuggling and illegal drug dealing and income from these activities is taxable.

Other forms of ordinary income include 'adventure or concern in the nature of trade', which is a single activity that is not part of a taxpayer's normal income earning activities however may be considered a business in itself. These can include generating a profit from a profit making scheme, and profit earned from activities that go beyond the mere realisation of an asset in an enterprising manner. Income from investment or property is also classified as ordinary income and can include: rent from a lease, interest on a loan, dividends and royalties.

When assessing the amount of ordinary income, only the profits are counted based on a notional basis.

=== Residency for tax purposes ===
A resident for tax purposes is subject to income tax on income from all sources, whereas non-residents for tax purposes are only subject to income tax in Australia on their income from Australian sources.

There are four tests to determine whether an individual is a resident for income tax purposes:

- if they are making contributions to a Commonwealth superannuation fund,
- in Australia for more than half the year,
- have their domicile or permanent place of abode in Australia, or
- if they dwell permanently or for a considerable time in Australia.

A company will be considered an Australian resident for taxation purposes if it falls under any of the following three criteria:

- incorporated in Australia,
- carries on business in Australia and central management and control is in Australia, or
- carries on business in Australia and it is controlled by Australian resident shareholders.

There are other issues when considering residence in relation to the source of income. Personal exertion income is derived where the services are performed and for a profit making activity income is where the contract is performed. Property income is derived where the property is located, interest income where the money is lent and dividend income where the paying company is located.

If a taxpayer ceases to be an Australian resident for tax purposes, this triggers Capital Gains Tax event I1. This means that the taxpayer must choose whether to immediately pay Capital Gains Tax on all their holdings (other than those related to Australian real estate) or pay Capital Gains Tax on these holdings when they are disposed of, even if the taxpayer is no longer a resident of Australia at that time.

== See also ==
- Constitutional basis of taxation in Australia
- Taxation in Australia
- Stage three tax cuts
