= Taxation in Australia =

Taxation in Australia covers income tax, GST and other taxes levied by both the states and the Federal government of Australia. Income taxes are the most significant form of taxation in Australia, and collected by the federal government through the Australian Taxation Office (ATO). Australian GST revenue is collected by the Federal government, and then paid to the states under a distribution formula determined by the Commonwealth Grants Commission.

Australians pay tax for the provision of healthcare, education, defense, roads and railways and for payments to welfare, disaster relief and pensions.

== Definition ==
The "classic definition" of a tax used by the High Court derived from Matthews v Chicory Marketing Board (Vic) (1938), where Chief Justice John Latham stated that a tax was "a compulsory exaction of money by a public authority for public purposes, enforceable by law, and is not a payment for services rendered". In a series of judgments under the Mason court – including Air Caledonie International v Commonwealth (1988), Northern Suburbs General Cemetery Reserve Trust v Commonwealth (1993), and Australian Tape Manufacturers Association Ltd v Commonwealth (1993) – the court broadened the Matthews definition to include amounts not payable to public authorities, such as non-government collection agencies.

== History ==
The total tax revenue as a percentage of Australia's GDP from 1980 to 2021, compared to other OECD nations

When the first Governor, Governor Phillip, arrived in New South Wales in 1788, he had a Royal Instruction that gave him power to impose taxation if the colony needed it. The first taxes in Australia were raised to help pay for the completion of Sydney's first jail and provide for the orphans of the colony. Import duties were put on spirits, wine and beer and later on luxury goods.

After 1824 the Government of New South Wales raised extra revenue from customs and excise duties. These were the most important sources of revenue for the colony throughout the 19th century. Taxes were raised on spirits, beer, tobacco, cigars and cigarettes. These taxes would vary between each of the Australian colonies, and this state of affairs remained in place after the colonies achieved statehood.

Thomas de la Condamine was appointed as the first Collector of the Internal Revenue on 7 April 1827 with the actual office of the Collector of the Internal Revenue established on 1 May 1827 by Governor Ralph Darling. When de la Condamine's appointment was not confirmed by the Secretary of State for War and the Colonies William Huskisson, the duties fell to James Busby who held the position until December 1835 when the position was filled by William McPhereson. The Collector of the Internal Revenue collected all revenue, such as moneys received from the sale or rental of land except that from customs duties and court fees. The Internal Revenue Office was abolished on 4 January 1837 with its business becoming the responsibility of the Colonial Treasurer.

Colonial governments also raised money from fees on wills and stamp duty, which is a tax imposed on certain kinds of documents. In 1880, the Colony of Tasmania imposed a tax on earnings received from the profits of public companies.

Income taxes were introduced in the late 19th century in a few of the colonies before Federation. In 1884, a general tax on income was introduced in South Australia, and in 1895 income tax was introduced in New South Wales at the rate of six pence in the pound, or 2.5%. Federal income tax was first introduced in 1915, in order to help fund Australia's war effort in the First World War. Between 1915 and 1942, income taxes were levied at both the state and federal level.

The Taxation Administration Act 1953 was assented to on 4 March 1953.

In 1972, the government of William McMahon appointed the NSW Supreme Court judge Kenneth Asprey to conduct a full and wide-ranging review of the tax system. Although controversial when completed for the Whitlam Government in 1975, the Asprey report on taxation has acted "as a guide and inspiration to governments and their advisers for the following 25 years." The main recommendations of the report have all been implemented and are today part of Commonwealth taxation in Australia.

On 20 September 1985, Capital gains tax was introduced. The GST replaced the older wholesale sales tax in 2000.

The Review of Business Taxation chaired by Mr John Ralph suggested sweeping changes to business taxation in Australia.

In July 2001, the Financial Institutions Duty was abolished. Between 2002 and 2005, Bank Account Debits Tax was abolished.

On 1 July 2012 the Federal government introduced a Carbon price, requiring large emitters of carbon dioxide to purchase permits, the government also introduced a Minerals Resource Rent Tax, originally called a resources 'super profits' tax in the Henry Tax Report. The revenue from the carbon pricing regime was used to reduce income tax by increasing the tax-free threshold and increase pensions and welfare payments, as well as introducing compensation for some affected industries. The Carbon Tax and associated Resources Rent tax were repealed in 2014.

When the Liberal-National Coalition (LNP) assumed power in September 2013, they embarked on an agenda of tax reforms that would shape Australia's fiscal landscape over the next decade. The LNP introduced a suite of measures that reflected their election commitments. These reforms spanned small business tax reductions, personal income tax relief, and superannuation adjustments.

In the 2015–16 financial year, the government lowered the corporate tax rate for small business entities with an aggregated annual turnover of less than $2 million to 28.5%, down from the standard 30%. This reduction, announced in the 2015–16 Budget, aimed to invigorate small businesses, which employ millions of Australians and drive local economies. The following year, the turnover threshold was expanded to $10 million, with the tax rate reduced to 27.5%. By 2017–18, these benefits extended to base rate entities with turnovers below $50 million, bringing the rate down to 25%. These cuts were designed to stimulate investment, encourage job creation, and reward entrepreneurial spirit. Official data from the Australian Bureau of Statistics shows employment growth of 1.9 million between 2013 and 2022, with the unemployment rate dropping to 3.9% by February 2022, suggesting a link between these tax policies and strong labour market outcomes. The Productivity Commission's 2021 report also noted the role of these measures in supporting small and medium enterprises during economic challenges. Alongside small business support, the LNP provided tax relief for individual taxpayers, particularly low and middle-income earners facing cost-of-living pressures.

In the 2018–19 financial year, the government introduced the Low and Middle Income Tax Offset (LMITO), offering up to $1,080 in relief for individuals earning between $48,000 and $90,000, with benefits extending to those with incomes up to $126,000. Unveiled in the 2018 Budget, this measure aimed to boost disposable income and stimulate economic activity. In 2019, the LNP legislated stage 2 tax cuts, effective from the 2022–23 income year, raising the 19% tax rate threshold from $41,000 to $45,000 and lowering the 32.5% rate to 30% for incomes between $45,000 and $200,000. Treasury estimated the fiscal cost at $100 billion over four years, but the LNP asserted it was an investment in economic participation. The LNP also reformed superannuation taxation, increasing the tax rate on earnings from accounts exceeding $1.6 million from 15% to 30% in 2017, targeting high-balance accounts to ensure fairness. This aligned with the Superannuation (Objective) Bill 2016, aiming to preserve the system's purpose for retirement income.

The Government has brought back a duty on financial institutions in the form of a 'major bank levy' on the five largest banks in Australia.

== Forms of taxes and excises, both Federal and State ==
=== Personal income taxes ===
Income taxes on individuals are imposed at the federal level. This is the most significant source of revenue in Australia. State governments have not imposed income taxes since World War II. Personal income taxes in Australia are imposed on the personal income of each person on a progressive basis, with higher rates applying to higher income levels. Unlike some other countries, personal income tax in Australia is imposed on an individual and not on a family unit.

Individuals are also taxed on their share of any partnership or trust profits to which they are entitled for the financial year. A tax file number is a personal reference number required to pay tax in Australia. TFNs are used for identification and record keeping purposes. A tax return is due once per financial year.

=== Capital gains tax ===
Quarterly taxation revenues derived from financial and capital transactions ($millions) since 1972

Capital Gains Tax (CGT) in the context of the Australian taxation system applies to the capital gain made on disposal of any asset, except for specific exemptions. The most significant exemption is the family home. Rollover provisions apply to some disposals, one of the most significant is transfers to beneficiaries on death, so that the CGT is not a quasi death duty.

CGT operates by having net gains treated as taxable income in the tax year an asset is sold or otherwise disposed of. If an asset is held for at least 1 year then any gain is first discounted by 50% for individual taxpayers, or by 33 1/3% for superannuation funds. Net capital losses in a tax year may be carried forward and offset against future capital gains. However, capital losses cannot be offset against income.

Personal use assets and collectables are treated as separate categories and losses on those are quarantined so they can only be applied against gains in the same category, not other gains. This works to stop taxpayers subsidising hobbies from their investment earnings.

=== Corporate taxes ===
A company tax is paid by companies and corporations on its net profit, but the company's loss is carried forward to the next financial year. Unlike personal income taxes which use a progressive scale, company tax is calculated at a flat rate of 30% (25% for small businesses, which are defined below). Corporate tax is paid on the corporation's profit at the corporate rate and is generally available for distribution, in addition to any retained earnings it may have carried forward, to shareholders as dividends.

A tax credit (called a franking credit) is available to resident shareholders who receive the dividends to reflect the tax paid by the corporation (a process known as dividend imputation). A withholding tax applies on unfranked dividends paid to non-resident shareholders.

From 2015/16, designated "small business entities" with an aggregated annual turnover threshold of less than $2 million were eligible for a lower tax rate of 28.5%. Since 1 July 2016, small business entities with aggregated annual turnover of less than $10 million have had a reduced company tax rate of 27.5%. From 2017/18, corporate entities eligible for the lower tax rate have been known as "base rate entities". The small business threshold has remained at $10 million since 2017/18; but the base rate entity threshold (the aggregated annual turnover threshold under which entities will be eligible to pay a lower tax rate) has continued to rise until the base rate entities have an annual turnover of $50 million giving a tax rate of 25% to the entities below this threshold.

Company tax rate	Period	Notes
45%	1973–1979	
46%	1979–1986	
49%	1986–1988	The system of company taxation replaced by dividend imputation in 1987
39%	1988–1993	
33%	1993–1995	
36%	1995–2000	Accelerated depreciation removed in 1999
34%	2000–2001	Refundable imputation credits introduced in 2000
30%	2001–2017	
27.5% (small business) 30%	2017–	Businesses with less than A$25 million annual turnover and where 80% or less of their revenue is passive income are taxed at the lower rate

=== Trustee liability taxes ===
Where all or part of the net trust income is distributed to either non-residents or minors, the trustee of that trust is assessed on that share on behalf of the beneficiary. In this case, the beneficiaries must declare that share of net trust income on their individual income tax returns, and also claim a credit for the amount of tax the trustee paid on their behalf.

Where the trust accumulates net trust income, the trustee is assessed on that accumulated income at the highest individual marginal rate.

In both cases the trustee will be issued a notice of assessment subsequent to lodging the trust tax return.

=== Goods and Services taxes ===
Quarterly sales tax revenues ($millions) since 1972, which were largely replaced by the GST in 2000

Quarterly goods and services tax revenues ($millions) since 2000

A goods and services tax (GST) is a value added tax levied by the federal government at 10% on the supply of most goods and services by entities registered for the tax. The GST was introduced in Australia on 1 July 2000 by the then Howard Liberal government. A number of supplies are GST-free (e.g., many basic foodstuffs, medical and educational services, exports), input-taxed (residential accommodation, financial services, etc.), exempt (Government charges) or outside the scope of GST.

The revenue from this tax is distributed to the States.

State governments do not levy any sales taxes though they do impose stamp duties on a range of transactions.

In summary, the GST rate of 10% is charged on most goods and services consumed in Australia. A business which is registered for GST would include the GST in the sale prices it charges. However, a business can claim a credit for the GST paid on business expenses and other inputs (called a GST credit). The business would pay to the Tax Office the difference between GST charged on sales and GST credits.

Two types of sales are treated differently:

1. Suppliers of GST-free goods and services will not have to pay GST when they make a sale but they will be entitled to GST credits.
2. Suppliers of input taxed goods and services do not have to charge GST on sales but they will not be entitled to claim GST credits from their purchases of inputs.

=== Property taxes ===
Total quarterly (seasonally adjusted) land tax revenues ($millions) since 1972

Local governments are typically funded largely by taxes on land value (council rates) on residential, industrial and commercial properties. In addition, some State governments levy tax on land values for investors and primary residences of high value. The State governments also levy stamp duties on transfers of land and other similar transactions.

Fire Service Levies are also commonly applied to domestic house insurance and business insurance contracts. These levies are required under State Government law to assist in funding the fire services in each State.

=== Departure tax ===
The Passenger Movement Charge (PMC) is a fee levied by the Australian government on all passengers departing on international flights or maritime transport. The PMC replaced the departure tax in 1995 and was initially described as a charge to partially offset the cost to government of the provision of passenger facilitation at airports, principally customs, immigration and quarantine functions. It is classified by the International Air Transport Association as a departure tax, rather than an airport charge, as its revenue does not directly contribute to passenger processing at airports or sea ports. Since 2017, the PMC has been a flat rate of A$60 per passenger over 12 years of age, with a few limited exemptions.

=== Excise taxes ===
Quarterly excise tax revenue ($millions) since 1973

The Federal Government imposes excise taxes on goods such as cigarettes, petrol, and alcohol. The rates imposed may change in February and August each year in response to changes in the consumer price index. Australians pay some of the highest tobacco taxes in the world. National tobacco-specific taxes already make up more than 65% of the retail price of a cigarette in Australia. The aim is to reduce the number of daily smokers to below 5% by 2030.

==== Fuel taxes in Australia ====
The excise tax on commonly used fuels in Australia from 5 February 2024 are as follows:

- A$0.496 per litre on Unleaded Petrol fuel (Petrol used in aviation is excised at a different rate)
- A$0.496 per litre on Diesel fuel
- A$0.162 per litre on Liquified petroleum gas used as fuel (Autogas or LPG as it is commonly known in Australia)
- A$0.163 per litre on Ethanol fuel (not including blended fuels)
- A$0.132 per litre on Biodiesel (not including blended fuels)

Notes:

1. Petrol when used for aviation is excised at $0.03556 per litre.
2. Diesel/Gasoline when blended with ethanol and/or biodiesel are excised at a rate calculated based on the excise of the constituent components.

==== Luxury Car Tax ====
Luxury Car Tax is payable by businesses which sell or import luxury cars, where the value of the car is above $80,567 or $91,387 for fuel-efficient cars (defined as a car with a fuel consumption of less than 7L per 100 km)

=== Customs duties ===
Customs duties are imposed on many imported goods, such as alcohol, tobacco products, perfume, and other items. Some of these goods can be purchased duty-free at duty-free shops.

=== Payroll taxes ===
Quarterly payroll tax revenues ($millions) since 1972

Payroll taxes in Australia are levied by state governments on employers based on wages paid by them. Payroll tax rates vary between states. Typically, payroll tax applies to wages above the threshold, which also varies. Groups of companies may be taxed as a single entity where their operations are significantly integrated or related. This has significance in the grouping of payroll amounts in determining whether the threshold had been reached.

Current Payroll Tax Rates and Thresholds

State	Annual Threshold	Tax Rate
New South Wales	$750,000	5.45%
Queensland	$1,100,000	4.75%
South Australia	$600,000	4.95%
Australian Capital Territory	$1,750,000	6.85%
Victoria	$700,000	4.85% (metro), 1.2125% (regional)
Western Australia	$750,000	5.50%
Tasmania	$1,010,023	6.10%
Northern Territory	$1,500,000	5.50%

Queensland and the Northern Territory payroll tax rates are effective rates on payrolls above $5.5 million and $5.75 million respectively. All other jurisdictions levy marginal rates. Some companies may be eligible for deductions, concessions and exemptions.

==== Payroll taxes in Australian Capital Territory ====
From 1 July 2014:

- The rate of payroll tax is 6.85%.
- The annual threshold is $1,850,000.
- The monthly threshold is $154,166.66.

==== Payroll taxes in New South Wales ====
From 1 July 2013:

- The rate of payroll tax is 5.45%.
- Medicare payments are up to 12%
- Pension Fund contribution is 9.5%
- The annual threshold is $750,000.
- The monthly threshold is:
  - 28 days = $57,534
  - 30 days = $61,644
  - 31 days = $63,699

Employers, or a group of related businesses, whose total Australian wages exceed the current NSW monthly threshold, are required to pay NSW payroll tax.

Each monthly payment or 'nil' remittance is due seven days after the end of each month or the next business day if the seventh day is a weekend (i.e. August payment is due by 7 September). The annual reconciliation and payment or 'nil' remittance is due by 21 July.

Effective July 2007 – In NSW, payroll tax is levied under the Payroll Tax Act 2007 and administered by the Taxation Administration Act 1996.

Prior to 1 July 2007 – In NSW, payroll tax was levied under the Payroll Tax Act 1971 and administered by the Taxation Administration Act 1996.

==== Payroll taxes in Northern Territory ====
From 1 July 2012:

- The rate of payroll tax is 5.50%.
- The annual threshold is $1,500,000.
- The monthly threshold is $125,000.

==== Payroll taxes in Queensland ====
Companies or groups of companies that pay $1,100,000 or more a year in Australian wages must pay payroll tax. There are deductions, concessions and exemptions available to those that are eligible.

From 1 July 2012:

- The rate of payroll tax is 4.75%.
- The annual threshold is $1,100,000.
- The monthly threshold is $91,666.

==== Payroll taxes in South Australia ====
A Payroll Tax liability arises in South Australia when an employer (or a Group of employers) has a wages bill in excess of $600,000 for services rendered by employees anywhere in Australia if any of those services are rendered or performed in South Australia.

From 1 July 2012:

- The rate of payroll tax is 4.95%.
- The annual threshold is $600,000.
- The monthly threshold is $50,000.

==== Payroll taxes in Tasmania ====
From 1 July 2013:

- The rate of payroll tax is 6.1%.
- The annual threshold is $1,250,000.
- The monthly threshold is:
  - 28 days = $95,890
  - 30 days = $102,740
  - 31 days = $106,164

==== Payroll taxes in Victoria ====
From 1 July 2021:

- The rate of payroll tax is 4.85% (1.2125% for regional employers)
- The annual threshold is $700,000.
- The monthly threshold is $58,333.

==== Payroll taxes in Western Australia ====
Payroll tax is a general purpose tax assessed on the wages paid by an employer in Western Australia. The tax is self-assessed in that the employer calculates the liability and then pays the appropriate amount to the Office of State Revenue, by way of a monthly, quarterly or annual return.

From 1 July 2014:

- The rate of payroll tax is 5.5%.
- The annual threshold is $800,000.
- The monthly threshold is $66,667.

On 8 December 2004 new legislation was passed making it mandatory for an employer that has, or is a member of a group that has, an expected payroll tax liability equal to or greater than $100,000 per annum, to lodge and pay their payroll tax return via Revenue Online (ROL). This amendment to the Payroll Tax Assessment Act 2002 was effective 1 July 2006.

=== Fringe Benefits Tax ===
Quarterly Fringe Benefits Tax revenue ($millions) since 1972

Fringe Benefits Tax is the tax applied by the Australian Taxation Office to most, although not all, fringe benefits, which are generally non-cash benefits. Most fringe benefits are also reported on employee payment summaries for inclusion on personal income tax returns that must be lodged annually.

=== Inheritance tax ===
There is no inheritance tax in Australia, with all states in Australia abolishing what was known as death duties in 1979 following the lead of the Queensland Government led by Joh Bjelke-Petersen.

Prior to their abolition between 1977 and 1982, inheritance, estate, and gift taxes in Australia—collectively known as death and gift duties—were imposed by both the Commonwealth and individual states. The federal estate duty, introduced under the Estate Duty Assessment Act 1914 (Cth), applied to estates exceeding a basic exemption of about A$40,000 in the late 1970s. State duties, operating under separate legislation such as the Probate or Succession Duties Acts, often had lower exemptions of around A$20,000–A$25,000, resulting in many estates being taxed twice. Rates were progressive and varied across jurisdictions. Federal rates ranged from approximately 1% to 30–35%, while state rates could reach 60–70% on large estates. Both systems taxed bequests to spouses and direct descendants at lower rates than transfers to distant relatives or unrelated beneficiaries. Separate gift duties applied to lifetime transfers above annual exemptions, typically between A$2,000 and A$5,000, to prevent avoidance of estate duties through inter vivos gifts.

Despite their design, the combined system was widely criticised for duplication, complexity, and low exemption thresholds that failed to adjust for inflation. The duties were seen as disproportionately affecting small estates, widows, and farmers who were sometimes forced to sell property to pay tax liabilities. By the mid-1970s, only about 12% of decedents’ estates were subject to federal duty, though roughly double that number were taxed at the state level.

Abolition began when Queensland repealed its death and gift duties in 1976, followed by South Australia and Western Australia in 1980, Victoria and New South Wales in 1981, and Tasmania in 1982. The Commonwealth abolished its estate and gift duties effective 1 July 1979. The removal of these taxes left Australia as the only major industrialised nation without a tax on capital transfers such as inheritance or gifts.

Private pensions (known as superannuation in Australia) may be taxed at up to three points, depending on the circumstances: at the point of contribution to a fund, on investment income and at the time benefits are received. The compulsory nature of Australian Superannuation means that it is sometimes regarded as being similar to social security taxes levied in other nations. This is more frequently the case when comparisons are being made between the tax burden of respective nations.

== See also ==
- Australia Tax
- Negative gearing in Australia
- Office of State Revenue (New South Wales)
- Salary packaging
- Tax Institute (Australia)

History:

- Bottom of the harbour tax avoidance
- Cherry-picking tax avoidance
- Darwin Rebellion

Tax law:

- Constitutional basis of taxation in Australia
- Bank Notes Tax Act 1910

Related:

- Australian federal budget
- List of countries by tax rates
