= Tax deduction =

Amount that one may deduce from taxable revenue

A tax deduction is an amount deducted from taxable income, usually based on expenses such as those incurred to produce additional income. Tax deductions are a form of tax incentives, along with exemptions and tax credits. The difference between deductions, exemptions, and credits is that deductions and exemptions both reduce taxable income, while credits reduce tax.

== Above and below the line ==
Above and below the line refers to items above or below adjusted gross income, which is item 37 on the tax year 2017 1040 tax form. Tax deductions above the line lessen adjusted gross income, while deductions below the line can only lessen taxable income if the aggregate of those deductions exceeds the standard deduction, which in tax year 2018 in the U.S., for example, was $12,000 for a single taxpayer and $24,000 for married couple.

== Limitations ==
Often, deductions are subject to conditions, such as being allowed only for expenses incurred that produce current benefits. Capitalization of items producing future benefit can be required, though with some exceptions. A deduction is allowed, for example, on interest paid on student loans. Some systems allow taxpayer deductions for items the influential parties want to encourage as purchases.

== Business expenses ==
Nearly all jurisdictions that tax business income allow deductions for business and trade expenses. Allowances vary and may be general or restricted. To be deducted, the expenses must be incurred in furthering business, and usually only include activities undertaken for profit.

=== Cost of goods sold ===
Nearly all income tax systems allow a deduction for the cost of goods sold. This may be considered an expense, a reduction of gross income, or merely a component utilized in computing net profits. The manner in which cost of goods sold is determined has several inherent complexities, including various accounting methods. These include:

- Conventions for assigning costs to particular goods sold where specific identification is infeasible.
- Methods for attributing common costs, such as factory burden, to particular goods.
- Methods for determining when costs are recognized in computing cost of goods sold or to be sold.
- Methods for recognizing costs of goods that will not be sold or have declined in value.

=== Trading or ordinary and necessary business expenses ===
Many systems, including the United Kingdom, levy tax on all chargeable "profits of a trade" computed under local generally accepted accounting principles (GAAP). Under this approach, determination of whether an item is deductible depends upon accounting rules and judgments. By contrast, the U.S. allows as a deduction "all the ordinary and necessary expenses paid or incurred during the taxable year in carrying on any trade or business..." subject to qualifications, enhancements, and limitations. A similar approach is followed by Canada, but generally with fewer special rules. Such an approach poses significant definitional issues. Among the definitional issues often addressed are:

- What constitutes a trade or business? Generally, the business must be regular, continuous, substantial, and entered into with an expectation of profit.
- What expenses are ordinary and necessary? The phrase deals with what expenses are appropriate to the nature of the business, whether the expenses are of the sort expected to help produce income and promote the business, and whether the expenses are not lavish and extravagant.

Note that under this concept, the same sorts of expenses are generally deductible by business entities and individuals carrying on a trade or business. To the extent such expenses relate to the employment of an individual and are not reimbursed by the employer, the amount may be deductible by the individual.

Business deductions of flow-through entities may flow through as a component of the entity's net income in some jurisdictions. Deductions of flow-through entities may pass through to members of such entities separately from the net income of the entity in some jurisdictions or some cases. For example, charitable contributions by trusts, and all deductions of partnerships (and S corporations in the U.S.) are deductible by member beneficiaries or partners (or S corporation shareholders) in a manner appropriate to the deduction and the member, such as itemized deductions for charitable contributions or a component of net business profits for business expenses.

=== Accounting methods ===
One important aspect of determining tax deductions for business expenses is the timing of such deduction. The method used for this is commonly referred to as an accounting method. Accounting methods for tax purposes may differ from applicable GAAP. Examples include timing of recognition of cost recovery deductions (e.g., depreciation), current expensing of otherwise capitalizable costs of intangibles, and rules related to costs that should be treated as part of cost of goods not yet sold. Further, taxpayers often have choices among multiple accounting methods permissible under GAAP and/or tax rules. Examples include conventions for determining which goods have been sold (such as first-in-first-out, average cost, etc.), whether or not to defer minor expenses producing benefit in the immediately succeeding period, etc.

Accounting methods may be defined with some precision by tax law, as in the U.S. system, or may be based on GAAP, as in the UK system.

=== Limits on deductions ===
Many systems limit particular deductions, even where the expenses directly relate to the business. Such limitations may, by way of example, include:

- Maximum deductions for use of automobiles
- Limits on deducting compensation of certain key employees
- Limits on lobbying or similar expenditures
- Nondeductibility of payments considered in violation of public policy, such as criminal fines
- Limits on deductions for business-related entertainment but no limit in 2021 taxes and beyond.

In addition, deductions in excess of income in one endeavor may not be allowed to offset income from other endeavors. For example, the United States limits deductions related to passive activities to income from passive activities.

In particular, expenses that are included in COGS cannot be deducted again as a business expense. COGS expenses include:

- The cost of products or raw materials, including freight or shipping charges;
- The cost of storing products the business sells;
- Direct labor costs for workers who produce the products; and
- Factory overhead expenses.

In 2005, the Australian government amended its taxation legislation to remove deductions for expenses incurred in conducting criminal business activities. This came after the Federal Court ruled in Commissioner of Taxation v La Rosa that a heroin dealer was entitled to a tax deduction for money stolen from him in a drug deal.

== Capitalized items and cost recovery (depreciation) ==
Many systems require that the cost of items likely to produce future benefits be capitalized. Examples include plant and equipment, fees related to acquisition, and developing intangible assets (e.g., patentable inventions). Such systems often allow a tax deduction for cost recovery in a future period.

A common approach to such cost recovery is to allow a deduction for a portion of the cost ratably over some period of years. The U.S. system refers to such a cost recovery deduction as depreciation for costs of tangible assets and as amortization for costs of intangible assets. Depreciation in these systems is allowed over an estimated useful life, which may be assigned by the government for numerous classes of assets, based on the nature and use of the asset and the nature of the business. The annual depreciation deduction may be computed on a straight line, declining balance, or other basis, as permitted in each country's rules. Many systems allow amortization of the cost of intangible assets only on a straight-line basis, generally computed monthly over the actual expected life or a government specified life.

Alternative approaches are used by some systems. Some systems allow a fixed percentage or dollar amount of cost recovery in particular years, often called "capital allowances". This may be determined by reference to the type of asset or business. Some systems allow specific charges for cost recovery for some assets upon certain identifiable events.

Capitalization may be required for some items without the potential for cost recovery until disposition or abandonment of the asset to which the capitalized costs relate. This is often the case for costs related to the formation or reorganization of a corporation, or certain expenses in corporate acquisitions. However, some systems provide for amortization of certain such costs, at the election of the taxpayer.

== Non-business expenses ==
Some systems distinguish between an active trade or business and the holding of assets to produce income. In such systems, there may be additional limitations on the timing and nature of amounts that may be claimed as tax deductions. Many of the rules, including accounting methods and limits on deductions, that apply to business expenses also apply to income producing expenses.

=== Losses ===
Many systems allow a deduction for loss on sale, exchange, or abandonment of both business and non-business income producing assets. This deduction may be limited to gains from the same class of assets. In the U.S., a loss on non-business assets is considered a capital loss, and deduction of the loss is limited to capital gains. Also, in the U.S. a loss on the sale of the taxpayer's principal residence or other personal assets is not allowed as a deduction except to the extent due to casualty or theft.

=== Personal deductions ===
Many jurisdictions allow certain classes of taxpayers to reduce taxable income for certain inherently personal items. A common such deduction is a fixed allowance for the taxpayer and certain family members or other persons supported by the taxpayer. The U.S. allows such a deduction for "personal exemptions" for the taxpayer and certain members of the taxpayer's household. The UK grants a "personal allowance". Both U.S. and UK allowances are phased out for individuals or married couples with income in excess of specified levels.

In addition, many jurisdictions allow reduction of taxable income for certain categories of expenses not incurred in connection with a business or investments. In the U.S. system, these (as well as certain business or investment expenses) are referred to as "itemized deductions" for individuals. The UK allows a few of these as personal reliefs. These include, for example, the following for U.S. residents (and UK residents as noted):

- Medical expenses (in excess of 7.5% of adjusted gross income)
- State and local income and property taxes (the SALT deduction in the United States)
- Interest expense on certain home loans
- Gifts of money or property to qualifying charitable organizations, subject to certain maximum limitations,
- Losses on non-income-producing property due to casualty or theft,
- Contribution to certain retirement or health savings plans (U.S. and UK),
- Certain educational expenses.

Many systems provide that an individual may claim a tax deduction for personal payments that, upon payment, become taxable to another person, such as alimony. Such systems generally require, at a minimum, reporting of such amounts, and may require that withholding tax be applied to the payment.

== Groups of taxpayers ==
Some systems allow a deduction to a company or other entity for expenses or losses of another company or entity if the two companies or entities are commonly controlled. Such deduction may be referred to as "group relief." Generally, such deductions function in lieu of consolidated or combined computation of tax (tax consolidation) for such groups. Group relief may be available for companies in EU member countries with respect to losses of group companies in other countries.

== International aspects ==
Many systems impose limitations on tax deductions paid to foreign parties, especially related parties. See International tax and Transfer pricing.
