= Income Tax Assessment Act 1936 =

Act of the Parliament of Australia

Parliament of Australia
- Long title: An Act to consolidate and amend the Law relating to the Imposition Assessment and Collection of a Tax upon Incomes.
- Citation: No. 27 of 1936 or No. 27, 1936 as amended
- Territorial extent: States and territories of Australia
- Enacted by: Australian House of Representatives
- Assented to: 2 June 1936

Legislative history
- Bill title: Income Tax Assessment Bill 1935
- Introduced by: Richard G. Casey
- Status: In force

The Income Tax Assessment Act 1936 (Cth) is an Act of the Parliament of Australia. It is one of the main statutes under which income tax is calculated. The Act is gradually being rewritten into the Income Tax Assessment Act 1997, and new matters are generally now added to the 1997 Act.

The reason for rewriting the act is that amendments over the years have made it thousands of pages long, and very complex. Amendments have also created subsection upon subsection.

== The Act ==
=== Section 260 ===
Section 260 was the initial general anti-avoidance provision in the act, present from its inception in 1936 and operative until 27 May 1981. The section held any contract

1. altering the incidence of any income tax;
2. relieving any person from liability to pay any income tax or make any return;
3. defeating, evading, or avoiding any duty or liability imposed on any person by this Act; or
4. preventing the operation of this Act in any respect;

to be void as against the Commissioner.

"Void against the commissioner" meant such a contract would be ignored for taxation determination, but was still enforcible by the parties against each other (the same as any other contract).

The section was present in essentially the same form in the Commonwealth Income Tax Assessment Act 1915 (and it seems in a prior act from 1895). The history of the section is principally the history of the interpretation of its wording by the courts. The wording was notably broad; as early as 1921, Chief Justice Knox remarked on that (referring to the 1915 act), saying "The section, if construed literally, would extend to every transaction whether voluntary or for value which had the effect of reducing the income of any taxpayer."

In consequence, the courts, of necessity, "read down" the section so it would not apply to every transaction, that obviously not being the legislature's intention.

In Newton v FCT (1958), on appeal to the Privy Council, a kind of "predication" test was described. Lord Denning in his judgement said:

you must be able to predicate – by looking at the overt acts by which it was implemented – that it was implemented in that particular way so as to avoid tax. If you cannot so predicate, but have to acknowledge that the transactions are capable of explanation by reference to ordinary business or family dealing ... then the arrangement does not come within the section.

A somewhat different stream of interpretation was established in Keighery v FCT (1957) where a taxpayer who made a choice between alternatives explicitly offered by the legislation (in that case a public versus private company) did not come under section 260. This was called the "choice principle" and it spawned Mullens v FCT (1976) which extended that to allow taxpayers to deliberately put themselves into circumstances described by the act (even if by unusual transactions) without coming under section 260.

The Mullens case, and the subsequent Slutzkin and Cridland (1977) decided from it, were in a sense the demise of section 260. To the extent those schemes were regarded, in the mood of the time, as contrivances or outright avoidance, section 260 was failing in its apparent task. But the question of "avoidance" as opposed to taxpayers taking up concessions offered by the statute is not an easy one. Earlier, in the Newton case (in the High Court in 1957), Justice Kitto had given his now often quoted warning about section 260: "Section 260 is a difficult provision, inherited from earlier legislation, and long overdue for reform by someone who will take the trouble to analyse his ideas and define his intentions with precision before putting pen to paper."

That invitation for analysis and reform was not taken up until, it seems, court decisions started going in favour of the taxpayer, at which point the issues discussed in the Newton case were indeed considered in constructing the new Part IVA, replacing section 260 as of 27 May 1981.

=== Other provisions ===
- Section 26AH — the "ten-year rule" for life insurance policies and friendly society investment bonds. Gains on policy surrender etc. are taxed as income unless held for 10 years. Introduced in 1983.
- Sections 82KZL to 82KZO — deductibility of interest paid up to 12 months in advance on an investment loan. Lenders often promote such pre-payment (near the end of the tax year) as a tax advantage.
- Section 99A — tax on undistributed income of a trust, at the top personal rate plus medicare levy. This penal rate ensures trusts such as listed property trusts always distribute all their income.
- Division 6AA, being sections 102AA to 102AJ — tax on the unearned income of minors at penalty rates. This is an anti-avoidance provision to stop parents putting investments in the names of their children.
- Sections 160ZB(6), 26BB and 70B — taxing traditional securities, such as convertible notes (interest bearing notes convertible into shares), as income rather than capital gains.
- Part IVA (sections 177A to 177G). Part IVA of the 1936 Tax Act is a General Anti Avoidance Provision (‘GAAR’) which can apply to strike down any Australian income tax benefits arising from a scheme where the Commissioner of Taxation, who is the head of the Australian Taxation Office, can successfully establish that the dominant purpose of a party involved in the transaction was to reduce the incidence of Australian income tax.
- Division 2, being sections 202B to 202BF — Tax File Numbers.

=== Superseded provisions ===
- Section 52 — taxpayers obliged to advise the Commissioner each year of assets held for the purpose of making a profit, i.e. trading, and therefore on which a loss would be a deduction (as opposed to investment assets, on which a loss was not deductible). This was effectively how share traders (or the like) advised they were in that business. Making a declaration stopped an investor deciding "after the fact" that a loss was "trading" but a gain was "investing" (tax-free prior to capital gains tax). This section now applies only to pre-CGT assets (i.e. acquired before 20 September 1985), for which obviously by now a declaration must have long since been made.

== See also ==
- Taxation in Australia
