= Chapter IV of the Constitution of Australia =

Chapter of the Australian Constitution relating to trade, debt, and funding

Chapter IV of the Constitution of Australia pertains to trade (including between states and between the states and the Commonwealth), the appropriation of funds for the Commonwealth, state debts, and funds for the states given to them by the Commonwealth. Much of it no longer applies.

== Sections ==
Since 1929, Chapter IV has consisted of 26 sections:

- Section 81: Consolidated Revenue Fund
- Section 82: Expenditure charged thereon
- Section 83: Money to be appropriated by law
- Section 84: Transfer of officers
- Section 85: Transfer of property of State
- Section 86: Customs, excise, and bounties
- Section 87: Revenue from customs and excise duties
- Section 88: Uniform duties of customs
- Section 89: Payment to States before uniform duties
- Section 90: Exclusive power over customs, excise, and bounties
- Section 91: Exceptions as to bounties
- Section 92: Trade within the Commonwealth to be free
- Section 93: Payment to States for five years after uniform tariffs
- Section 94: Distribution of surplus
- Section 95: Customs duties of Western Australia
- Section 96: Financial assistance to States
- Section 97: Audit
- Section 98: Trade and commerce includes navigation and State railways
- Section 99: Commonwealth not to give preference
- Section 100: Nor abridge right to use water
- Section 101: Inter-State Commission
- Section 102: Parliament may forbid preferences by State
- Section 103: Commissioners' appointment, tenure, and remuneration
- Section 104: Saving of certain rates
- Section 105: Taking over public debts of States
- Section 105A: Agreements with respect to State debts
