= Fiscal imbalance in Australia =

The fiscal imbalance in Australia is the disparity between the revenue generation ability of the three levels of governments in Australia relative to their spending obligations; but in Australia the term is commonly used to refer more specifically to the vertical fiscal imbalance, the discrepancy between the federal government's extensive capacity to raise revenue and the responsibility of the States to provide most public services, such as physical infrastructure, health care, education etc., despite having only limited capacity to raise their own revenue. In Australia, vertical fiscal imbalance is addressed by the transfer of funds as grants from the federal government to the states and territories.

== Vertical fiscal imbalance ==
Vertical fiscal imbalance in Australia is largely the product of the Commonwealth's takeover of income taxes in 1942, during World War II, and rulings of the High Court of Australia that made various state taxes unconstitutional under the Australian Constitution, in particular section 90 and section 109.

The Australian Constitution allows both States and the Commonwealth to raise revenue, but subsequent constitutional interpretation and political developments have limited state taxing powers and led to a vertical fiscal imbalance. Vertical fiscal imbalance means that the revenue-raising abilities of the governments do not coincide with their spending responsibilities. As Section 51 and other provisions of the constitution (such as section 52 and section 90) prescribe only limited legislative powers to the Commonwealth, Australian states have considerable obligations. For example, primarily, Australian states fund schools and hospitals. The result of the limitations on state taxing power is that the Commonwealth collects the money through taxes, and distributes that money to states. The power to distribute funds to states, on conditions, is contained in Section 96 of the Australian Constitution. As a result, the sphere of Commonwealth power has expanded through dictating policy through conditional grants. This limits the autonomy and power of the states in controlling policy.

=== Loss of state income taxing power ===
Before 1942, consistent with the concurrent power in section 51(ii), both the states and the Commonwealth levied income taxes. However, in 1942 the Commonwealth attempted to gain a monopoly on income taxes by passing the Income Tax Act 1942 and the States Grants (Income Tax Reimbursement) Act 1942. The first act purported to impose Commonwealth income tax. The latter act said Commonwealth funding would be provided to the States only if they imposed no income tax. This latter act was premised on Section 96 of the Australian Constitution Act.

Section 96 of the Australian Constitution provides:

… the Parliament may grant financial assistance to any State on such terms and conditions as the Parliament thinks fit

The States Grant Act therefore placed the "term and condition" that states did not tax at all as a pre-requisite to funding. The Income Tax Act 1942, by setting high tax rates (i.e. that would reflect the combined current Commonwealth and State taxes) made imposing current tax rates unattractive or impossible for State governments. This was because the Income Tax Assessment Act 1942 said that individuals had to pay Commonwealth tax before State taxes. In effect, the scheme meant either the States had to accept grants and stop taxing, or decline grants and try to collect tax at rates which were unsustainable.

The High Court has interpreted "terms and conditions" very broadly. In South Australia v Commonwealth (1942) 65 CLR 373 (the First Uniform Tax case), the scheme was upheld. There is an opinion that the scheme, introduced in 1942, was upheld on the basis of the defence power in Section 51(vi). The Commonwealth re-enacted the scheme after the war. There was a second constitutional challenge in which the scheme was upheld on the basis of Section 96, in Victoria v Commonwealth (1957) 99 CLR 575 (the Second Uniform Tax case).

Since 1942, states have not imposed income taxes but have largely relied on Section 96 grants. In introducing the Goods and Services Tax (GST), the Commonwealth agreed to distribute GST revenues to the states according to a formula.

== Horizontal fiscal imbalance ==
Australia also has a horizontal fiscal imbalance, which arises because state and territory governments have different abilities to raise revenue from their tax bases and because their respective costs of providing public services differ. This imbalance is addressed by a horizontal fiscal equalisation (HFE) policy overseen by the Commonwealth Grants Commission. When the Commonwealth transfers funds to states and territories, it does not give each State a fixed amount or an amount proportional to the state's population relative to other states. Rather, it uses a formula to disburse funds to states on a needs-basis and its ability to raise its own revenue.

Australia has a formal horizontal fiscal equalisation (HFE) scheme, introduced in 1933, which distribute more funds to States and territories which have a lower capacity to raise revenue or have a greater cost burden, to enable each State and territory to have the capacity to provide services and the associated infrastructure at the same standard, if each made the same effort to raise revenue from its own sources and operated at the same level of efficiency.

Currently, the funds distributed to achieve HFE are the revenues raised by the Commonwealth from the goods and services tax (GST), currently about AU$50bn a year. The amount collected by the Commonwealth from GST is distributed by the federal Treasurer each year on the basis of advice provided by the Commonwealth Grants Commission.

Achieving HFE does not mean that the States are directed how to raise revenue or how to spend their funds. GST revenue grants from the Commonwealth are unencumbered and available for any purpose. Accordingly, HFE equalises fiscal capacity, not fiscal policies which remain for the States and territories to decide for themselves. It does not result in the same level of services or taxes in all States, direct that the States must achieve any specified level of service in any area, nor impose actual budget outcomes in accordance with the Commission's calculations.

== Specific purpose payments ==
Commonwealth grants to the states are of two types:

- general purpose payments, which states can use for whatever purpose they choose, and
- specific purpose payments (SPPs) (or tied grants), which are grants to states for specific projects decided by the Commonwealth, e.g. schools, hospitals, or roads.

The ability of the Commonwealth to make specific purpose payments without legislative authority was called into question in Williams v Commonwealth (2012) (also known as the "School chaplains case"). The High Court held that section 61 of the Constitution, which had commonly been thought to grant the Commonwealth unfettered powers to enter into specific purpose payments to the States, did not extend to payments where there was no supporting legislation.

== See also ==
- Fiscal imbalance
- Equalization payments
- Canada Pension Plan - unfunded liability
- Commonwealth Grants Commission
- Council of Australian Governments
- Constitutional basis of taxation in Australia

General:

- Constitutional economics
- Australian federal budget
- Federalism in Australia
