= Timeline of the expansion of federal powers in Australia =

Federalism was adopted, as a constitutional principle, in Australia on 1 January 1901. Relatively few changes have been made to the formal constitution since Australian federation occurred; in practice, however, the Commonwealth government has increasingly assumed a position of pre-eminence in many areas of governance through the acquisition and negotiation of additional powers and responsibilities directly with the Australian states and territories.

Year	Powers	Comments
1901	Transfer of Customs Powers, Military and Postal services and creation of a bicameral Parliament.	Australia's 6 colonies federated on 1 January 1901.
1903	First sitting of the High Court of Australia	Debate over the formation of the court delayed the Judiciary Act until 1903, when it was passed on 25 August and three justices appointed. The first sitting took place on 3 October 1903. On 12 October 1906, the size of the High Court was increased to five Justices, and an additional two in 1913.
1907	Takeover of the weather bureau and forecasts	
1908	Enactment of the Quarantine Act 1908.	
1910	Imposition of a Commonwealth Land Tax	Land Tax Assessment Act 1910
1910	First Australian ambassador appointed	Sir George Reid was sent to London as Australia's first ambassador.
1911	Commonwealth control over the lighthouses	
1911	Creation of the Federal Capital Territory	The territory is separated from New South Wales.
1911	Transfer of the Northern Territory from South Australia to the Commonwealth	Negotiations for the transfer commenced in 1901, leading to South Australia passing the Northern Territory Surrender Act 1908. Reciprocal legislation from the federal parliament, the Northern Territory (Administration) Act was defeated in 1909, and passed in 1910. The transfer took place on 1 January 1911.
1911	Compulsory electoral enrolment for all Australians	
1912	First foreign loan raised	The Commonwealth raised a foreign loan of a million pounds to build Australia House in London.
1914	Levy on estate duties	
1915	Federal Income Tax	Federal income tax was first introduced in 1915, as a wartime measure to help fund Australia's war effort in the First World War. Between 1915 and 1942, income taxes were levied by both State governments and the federal government.
1923	Australian Loan Council	The Loan Council is an Australian Commonwealth-State ministerial council that was formed in May 1923 to coordinates public sector borrowing and to avoid Australian governments competing against each other for capital funds.
1924	Compulsory voting introduced for the first time	First used in the 14 November 1925 elections. Participation rate increased from 60% in the previous election to 91%.
1927	Financial Agreement between the Commonwealth and the States	State government borrowing brought under federal government control.
1933	Commonwealth Grants Commission	The Commission recommends how the revenues raised from taxes should be distributed to the states and territories to achieve horizontal fiscal equalisation (HFE).
1942	Federal monopoly on the raising of Income Tax.	Achieved by providing financial grants to states (using the section 96 grants power), on the condition that they did not collect their own income taxes.
1964	Capital funding for schools introduced	The States Grants (Science Laboratories and Technical Training) Act 1964 was the first time the Commonwealth government directly funded schools.
1967	Power to make special laws for Aboriginal people	A constitutional amendment is carried giving the Commonwealth power to make special laws for Aborigines living in the States and to include indigenous peoples in the national census.
1968	Limitation placed upon appeals to the Privy Council.	Appeals to the Privy Council from other federal courts and territory supreme courts are abolished.
1969	Commencement of recurring funding for Catholic schools	States Grants (Independent Schools) Act 1969 introduced recurrent funding for students in Catholic schools. From 1973, these grants were fixed at a rate equivalent to 20 per cent of the cost of educating a child in a government school.
1971	Transfer of payroll taxes from Commonwealth to state governments.	The devolution of the power to levy payroll taxes from the Commonwealth to the states in 1971.
1974	States Grants (Urban Public Transport) Act	Introduction of Commonwealth funding for urban public transport in major Australian cities.
1986	The Australia Act officially confirms Australian independence from Britain.	Removal of Britain's power to legislate for any part of Australia and ends all appeals to the Privy Council.
1996	National Firearms Agreement	This gun control agreement between state governments was negotiated and implemented by the federal government. The federal government has leverage over state governments through its control over the importation of guns, whilst state governments regulate their use. The federal government funded the buyback of guns through a medicare levy.
1999	Introduction of the Goods and Services Tax (GST)	
1999	Environment Protection and Biodiversity Conservation Act 1999	Established a requirements to obtain approval from the Commonwealth Environmental Minister for actions likely to have a significant impact on matters of national environmental significance. This included flora, fauna, ecological communities and heritage.
2009	Creation of the Australian Curriculum, Assessment and Reporting Authority	Develops the national curriculum.
2013	National Disability Insurance Scheme Act 2013	Introduction of national scheme to support Australians with disability jointly governed and funded by the states and Commonwealth, with the exception of Western Australia, which retains state control over the NDIS within their jurisdiction.
