= Constitutional basis of taxation in Australia =

The constitutional basis of taxation in Australia is predominantly found in sections 51(ii), 90, 53, 55, and 96, of the Constitution of Australia. Their interpretation by the High Court of Australia has been integral to the functioning and evolution of federalism in Australia.

The constitutional scheme as well as judicial interpretations have created a vertical fiscal imbalance, whereby the Commonwealth has the revenue-raising abilities while the States have major spending responsibilities. For example, primarily, Australian states fund schools and hospitals. The result of the limitations on state taxing power is that the Commonwealth collects the money through taxes, and distributes that money to states. The power to distribute funds to states, on conditions, is contained in section 96. As a result, the sphere of Commonwealth power has expanded through dictating policy through conditional grants. This limits the autonomy and power of the states in controlling policy.

== Constitutional Provisions ==
=== Sources of Commonwealth taxing powers ===
==== Section 51(ii): taxation power ====
Australia is a federation and legislative power is distributed between the Commonwealth and the States. Section 51 enumerates areas of Commonwealth power.

Section 51(ii) allows the Commonwealth to enact laws in respect of taxation, but not so as to discriminate between States or parts of states.

The non-discrimination limitation repeats the more general prohibition found in section 99 that the Commonwealth cannot discriminate between states in laws on trade, commerce, or revenue.

The broad Commonwealth power to impose "taxation" must be read subject to the start of section 51 which grants the enumerated powers "subject to this constitution". Section 51(ii) must also be considered in combination with section 90.

Before 1942, consistent with the concurrent power in section 51(ii), both the states and the Commonwealth levied income taxes. However, in 1942 the Commonwealth attempted to gain a monopoly on income taxes by passing the Income Tax Act 1942 and the States Grants (Income Tax Reimbursement) Act 1942. The first act purported to impose Commonwealth income tax. The latter act said Commonwealth funding would be provided to the States only if they imposed no income tax. This latter act was premised on section 96.

Since 1942 no state has imposed income taxes; instead the states have largely relied on section 96 grants.

==== Section 90: duties of customs and of excise ====
Section 90 gives the Commonwealth the exclusive, as opposed to concurrent with the States, power to impose "duties of customs and of excise". Any state taxing law which can be characterized as a duty of customs or excise is unconstitutional.

The major purpose of section 90 was to achieve objectives of federation, including uniform trade relations with other countries and free trade between the states. However, As a result of the loss of income taxing powers in 1942, the states turned to other forms of taxation, though trying to avoid those taxes which they were constitutionally barred from imposing, such as "excise" taxes. The interpretation as to what constitutes an excise became a critical issue.

The definition of "customs and excise" has been considered by the High Court of Australia on a number of occasions. Generally, a customs duty is a tax imposed on goods entering a jurisdiction. An excise is a type of sales tax on goods, and the High Court has interpreted what constitutes an excise broadly. The High Court has found that any tax that imposes a tax up to and including the point of sale is an "excise", thereby striking out State sales taxes. For example, in Ha v New South Wales (1997) a State tobacco licence fee, which consisted of a fixed amount plus an amount calculated by reference to the value of tobacco sold, was struck down as an excise.

==== Section 114 ====
Section 114 provides that the Commonwealth cannot tax state property, nor States tax Commonwealth property, without the consent of the other. The entity that is claiming the exemption must actually be a State or the Commonwealth and an entity that is controlled by a State will not be covered. For example, a building society controlled by a State has been determined not to be the State, as it was only controlled by state laws relating to building societies. The courts have dealt with cases as to whether a tax is levied on property or something else. For example, a fringe benefits tax (FBT) is not a tax on property; it is a transaction affected by FBT which can result in a State being liable for FBT. Similarly, the Commonwealth can impose a tax on a state employee. The Commonwealth is exempt from some state taxes, such as land taxes and stamp duties, being taxes on property. In the case of local council rates, the Commonwealth claims exemption from rates, but "contributes" to local government in the form of grants to at least cover services provided, such as electricity, sewerage, rubbish disposal and the like, but not for road works, parks, general administrative expenses, etc.

==== Section 96: conditional Commonwealth grants ====
Section 96 (as still effective) provides:

… the Parliament may grant financial assistance to any State on such terms and conditions as the Parliament thinks fit.

The High Court has interpreted "terms and conditions" very broadly. In South Australia v Commonwealth (1942) 65 CLR 373 (the First Uniform Tax case) the scheme for the Commonwealth to take over the income tax field was upheld. The condition imposed by the States Grant Act was that a state not impose its own income tax. The Income Tax Act 1942, set high tax rates (i.e. that would reflect the combined current Commonwealth and State taxes) which made imposing State taxes unattractive or impossible. This was because the Income Tax Assessment Act 1942 required Commonwealth tax to be paid before State taxes. In effect, the scheme meant either the States had to accept grants and stop taxing, or decline grants and try to collect tax at rates which were unsustainable.

There was an opinion that the 1942 scheme was upheld on the basis of the defence power in section 51(vi). The Commonwealth re-enacted the scheme after the war, and there was a second constitutional challenge. The scheme was again upheld in 1957 on the basis of section 96, in Victoria v Commonwealth (the Second Uniform Tax case).

In introducing the Goods and Services Tax (GST), the Commonwealth agreed to distribute GST revenues to the States according to a formula set by the Commonwealth Grants Commission.

=== Procedural requirements of tax legislation ===
Section 53, and section 55, prescribe procedural requirements on tax laws.

==== Section 53: Senate not amend money bills ====
Section 53, in part, prevents the Senate from introducing or amending any bill dealing with taxation, revenues or appropriation. This section limits the power of the Senate and reflects a constitutional distinction between the House of Representatives, as the house of the people and the chamber to which the government is responsible, and the Senate, as the house of the states. However, the Senate may still request omissions from or amendments to any such bill (in which case the House of Representatives deals with the request as it sees fit), or block its passage entirely.

Section 53 does not apply to bills imposing or appropriating fines or other pecuniary penalties, or fees for licensing or services. The question of when a charge (e.g., an airport entry charge) is a tax, as opposed to a fine or a fee, has been a litigated issue.

==== Section 55: taxation bills to only deal with taxation ====
Section 55 requires that legislation imposing tax deal only with imposing tax and that other purported provisions in a piece of taxation legislation be of no effect. Furthermore, laws imposing taxation (except customs duties or excise) shall deal with 'one subject of taxation only', while laws imposing customs shall deal only with customs, and laws of excise only excise. If a law containing a tax provision is found to include any non-tax provisions, the court will render the non-tax provisions inoperative. In practice, if the tax provision is introduced in an amending instrument, the court will most likely strike down the amending instrument rather than render the entire law inoperative. This is what occurred in Air Caledonie International v Commonwealth. The purpose of this section is to protect the powers of the Senate to amend bills. According to section 53, the Senate cannot amend or originate taxation bills (see above). Thus, without the restrictions imposed by section 55, the House of Representatives could prevent the Senate from amending any bill simply by putting something into it concerning taxation. This section effectively prohibits riders on money bills such as are common in the United States, or omnibus bills including non-financial measures such as in Canada, and also results in Australian tax law being made up of several pieces of legislation: for example, some Acts setting out how and when tax is to be calculated and paid, while others actually impose the tax.

== See also ==
- Income tax in Australia
- Australian Taxation Office
- Fiscal imbalance in Australia

== Sources ==
- Michael Kobestky, Income Tax: Text, Materials and Essential Cases, (Sydney: The Federation Press 2005) ISBN 1-86287-545-6
- Cheryl Saunders, The Australian Constitution (annotated), (Carlton: Constitutional Centenary Foundation) ISBN 0-9586908-1-2
