= Australian Tape Manufacturers Association Ltd v Commonwealth =

Judgement of the High Court of Australia

- Court: High Court of Australia
- Full case name: Australian Tape Manufacturers Association Ltd and Others v The Commonwealth of Australia
- Decided: 11 March 1993
- Citations: [1993] HCA 10, (1993) 176 CLR 480

Court membership
- Judges sitting: Mason CJ, Brennan, Deane, Dawson, Toohey, Gaudron and McHugh JJ

Case opinions
- (4:3) The fee imposed was a tax pursuant to section 51(ii) (per Mason CJ, Brennan, Deane and Gaudron JJ)

Australian Tape Manufacturers Association Ltd v Commonwealth ("blank tapes levy case"), is a High Court of Australia case that provides guidance as to the constitutional definition of a tax.

== Facts ==
The Commonwealth made an amendment to the Copyright Act 1968 which was designed to compensate copyright owners for the domestic and private taping of audio material not deemed to be illegal. The money was not paid to the Commonwealth, but to a private entity that distributed the funds to copyright owners as a private copying levy.

== Decision ==
The Court majority (Mason CJ, Brennan, Deane, Gaudron JJ) relied on dicta from Air Caledonie International v Commonwealth, and ruled that the collecting body of a fee does not have to be a public body for the fee to be regarded as a tax. Therefore, a levy collected by a private body dictated by a statute for public purposes gives the private body a public character. The decision also raised the notion of raising taxes for the public interest.

The decision also contained a strong dissent from the minority (Dawson, Toohey and McHugh JJ). They were critical of the dicta from Air Caledonie as it contained no principles, and no examples. They did not view the fee paid as tax because it was not paid into general government consolidated revenue (Section 81 of the Constitution requires taxes to be paid into consolidated revenue). The royalty imposed by the government was a special type of debt that did not satisfy the elements of taxation. McHugh J added that the term "public purpose" meant government purpose, and the fee imposed had no government purpose. The Commonwealth played a merely supervisory role.

== See also ==
- Constitutional basis of taxation in Australia
- Australian constitutional law
