= South Australia v Commonwealth =

- Court: High Court of Australia
- Full case name: The State of South Australia v The Commonwealth; The State of Victoria v The Commonwealth; The State of Queensland v The Commonwealth; The State of Western Australia v The Commonwealth
- Decided: 23 July 1942
- Citations: [1942] HCA 14, (1942) 65 CLR 373

Court membership
- Judges sitting: Latham CJ, Rich, Starke, McTiernan and Williams JJ

Case opinions
- (5:0) The Income Tax Act 1942 was valid under the taxation power. (4:1) The State Grants Act 1942 was valid under the section 96 grants power. (per Latham CJ, Rich, McTiernan & Williams JJ. Starke J dissenting. (5:0) Section 221 of the Income Tax Assessment Act 1942 was valid. (3:2) The Income Tax (Wartime Arrangements) Act 1942 was valid under the defence power. Rich, McTiernan & Williams JJ. Latham CJ & Starke J dissenting.

Laws applied
- Overruled by
- Victoria v Commonwealth (Second Uniform Tax case)

South Australia v Commonwealth ("the First Uniform Tax case") is a decision of the High Court of Australia that established the Commonwealth government's ability to impose a scheme of uniform income tax across the country and displace the State. It was a major contributor to Australia's vertical fiscal imbalance in the spending requirements and taxing abilities of the various levels of government, and was thus a watershed moment in the development of federalism in Australia.

== Facts ==
In 1942 during the Second World War, the Commonwealth government needed extra revenue for the war effort. At the time, income taxes were levied at both the state and federal level. The Commonwealth requested the states to transfer their taxing powers for the duration of the war to allow one uniform national income tax system, with grants given back to the states to compensate for the lost revenue.

Doubting that the powers would be returned, the states rejected the request. In response, the Commonwealth moved to occupy the field unilaterally. As s51(ii) of the Constitution only allows the Commonwealth to impose federal taxation for federal purposes, it could not cover the field of taxation with any law. Nevertheless, the Commonwealth introduced a uniform income tax through an intricate scheme of four pieces of legislation.

- The Income Tax Act 1942, raised income tax levels to the existing state levels, setting it at such a rate that made it politically impossible for states to impose their own income taxes. The amount raised was enough to cover the war effort and grants for the states
- The States Grants Act 1942, provided a grant for each state equal to what it would have raised on its own income tax, on the condition that it did not raise its own income tax
- Section 221 of the Income Tax Assessment Act 1942, required taxpayers to meet their Commonwealth tax liabilities before state tax liabilities
- the Income Tax (Wartime Arrangements) Act 1942, required that the states transfer to the Commonwealth all state staff, offices, furniture and records used to collect income tax

The laws were challenged by the states of South Australia, Victoria, Queensland, and Western Australia.

== Decision ==
The High Court held the laws were valid, despite the practical result being the inability of the states to impose income tax.

The Income Tax Act 1942, was held to be valid despite the fact the rate was so high as to preclude the states from imposing income tax. As taxation is a non-purposive power, regardless of the object of the law, the subject matter was taxation, and hence valid under section 51(ii) of the Constitution.

The States Grants Act 1942, was held to be valid, despite its coercive effect. The Commonwealth can use the section 96 grants power to induce a state to exercise its own powers as well as abstain from using its powers. Hence the Commonwealth can do such things to encourage or discourage a state from exercising its powers, which are technically not coercion. Indirect compulsion is constitutional. While the Act made it almost impossible for the States to continue taxing, Chief Justice John Latham noted that the states still had the choice not to accept Commonwealth grants. Justice Edward McTiernan also considered the Act valid under the defence power.

Section 221 of the Income Assessment Act 1942, was held to be valid pursuant to section 51(ii) or was at the least valid under the implied incidental power. The subject matter of the law and the purpose of the law were both with respect to matters of taxation. McTiernan justified this section as valid under the defence power.

The Income Tax (Wartime Arrangements) Act 1942, was upheld by a majority under the defence power.

== Aftermath ==
The decision in relation to section 221 of the Income Assessment Act 1942 was subsequently overturned by the High Court in the Second Uniform Tax case.

== See also ==
- Constitutional basis of taxation in Australia
- Australian constitutional law
- Taxation in Australia
