= Federalism in Australia =

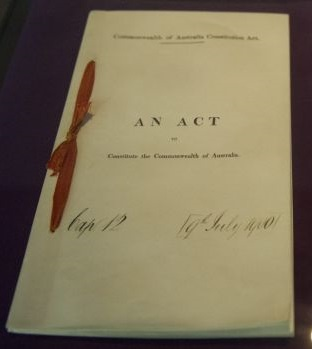
The Constitution of Australia established the principle of federalism in Australia.

Federalism was adopted, as a constitutional principle, in Australia on 1 January 1901 – the date upon which the six self-governing colonies of New South Wales, Queensland, South Australia, Tasmania, Victoria, and Western Australia federated, formally constituting the Commonwealth of Australia. It remains a federation of those six original States under the Constitution of Australia.

Australia is the seventh oldest surviving federation in the world after the United States (1789), Mexico (1824), Switzerland (1848), Argentina (1853), Canada (1867), and Brazil (1891). Australia's implementation utilised competitive federalism with the federal government lack of involvement in state matters.

Relatively few changes have been made in terms of the formal (written) constitution since Australian federation occurred; in practice, however, the way the federal system functions has changed enormously. The most significant respect in which it has changed is in the degree to which the Commonwealth government has assumed a position of dominance.

== History ==
=== Federation ===
Instigated by Henry Parkes' Tenterfield Oration of 24 October 1889, the Australian colonies conducted a series of constitutional conventions through the 1890s. These culminated in a draft Constitution that was put to popular vote in the individual colonies, and eventually approved by the electors, after a final round of changes met the higher threshold of support required in New South Wales. It was then passed into law by the Imperial Parliament in Britain as the Commonwealth of Australia Constitution Act 1900, finalising the process of the Federation of Australia.

The rather desultory way in which federation proceeded reflected the absence of compelling urgency. The colonies saw some advantage in removing tariff barriers to inter-colonial trade and commerce, having a greater strategic presence, and gaining access to investment capital at lower rates; individually, though, none of these represented a driving force. Taken together with the emergence for the first time of a distinct sense of Australian national identity, however, they were collectively sufficient. This lack of urgency was also reflected in their desire to create a minimally-centralised union.

=== Federal features in the Australian Constitution ===
In its design, Australia's federal system was modelled closely on the American federal system. This included: enumeration of the powers of parliament (s. 51) and not those of the States, with the States being assigned a broad 'residual' power instead (s. 108); a 'supremacy' clause (s. 109); strong bicameralism, with a Senate in which the States are equally represented notwithstanding great disparities in population (s. 7); the division of senators into different cohorts on alternating electoral cycles (s. 13); the establishment of a supreme court empowered to declare actions of either level of government unconstitutional, the High Court of Australia (s. 71); and a complex two-step amending procedure (s. 128).

=== Development of Australian Federalism ===
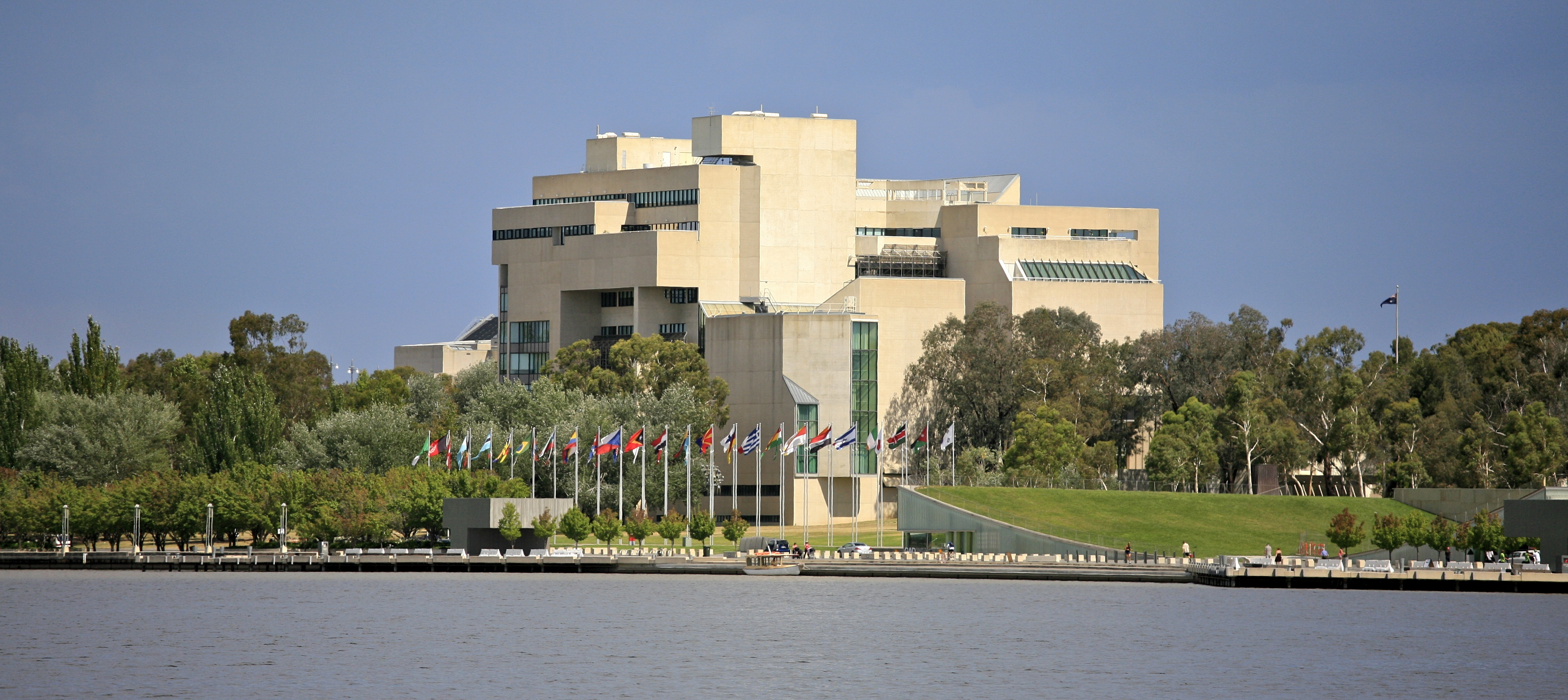
The High Court of Australia played an instrumental role in the development and evolution of federalism in Australia.

Since federation, the balance of power between levels of government has shifted substantially from the founders' vision. The shift has transferred power from State governments to the Commonwealth government. While voters have generally rejected proposals to enhance the Commonwealth's authority through constitutional amendment, the High Court has obliged, with generous interpretation of the Commonwealth's enumerated powers. A major factor has been the way the Commonwealth government has monopolised access to the main revenue sources.

For the first two decades, Australian federalism stayed reasonably true to the "co-ordinate" vision of the framers. In co-ordinate federalism, the Commonwealth and the States were both financially and politically independent within their own spheres of responsibility. This was reinforced by the High Court, which in a number of decisions in those early years rejected Commonwealth government attempts to extend its authority into areas of State jurisdiction.

A factor in the expansion of Commonwealth powers was Australia's involvement in the First World War. The turning point really came, though, with the High Court's decision in the 1920 Engineers Case, Amalgamated Society of Engineers v Adelaide Steamship Co Ltd, repudiating its early doctrines that had protected the co-ordinate model and the place of the States in the federation.

A system of co-operative federalism began to emerge in the 1920s and 1930s in response to both internal and external pressures. Elements of cooperative federalism included: the establishment of the Australian Loan Council in response to intergovernmental competition in the loan markets; the co-ordination of economic management and budgetary policies during the Great Depression; and the establishment of joint consultative bodies, usually in the form of ministerial councils.

A second turning point came with the threat to Australia at the beginning of the Second World War and the Commonwealth government's mobilisation of financial resources. The constitutional framework on tax allowed both the Commonwealth and States to levy taxes. However, in 1942 the Commonwealth introduced legislation to give it a monopoly on income taxes. It did this by providing financial grants to states (using the section 96 grants power), on the condition that they did not collect their own income taxes. The validity of this scheme was upheld twice in the High Court. "Uniform" income taxation levied by the Commonwealth became the principal instrument of Commonwealth financial domination and vertical imbalance in the Australian federal system (vertical fiscal imbalance). The system allowed the Commonwealth to intrude into traditional fields of State responsibility by means of specific purpose grants or loans to the States for purposes such as education, health and transport. Extensive use of these 'tied grants' by the Labor Government 1972–75 provided a "work-around" solution for the Australian Labor Party's long-standing frustration with the obstacles of federalism. It thus helped diminish Labor's antipathy to the federal system in Australia.

Despite the centralisation of legislative and financial power, there are many areas where federal Parliament lacks the power to regulate comprehensively, even where such regulation might be seen to be in the national interest. This has led State and federal governments to co-operate to create regulatory regimes in fields such as the marketing of agricultural products and competition policy.

Over the years Australia has developed an increasingly comprehensive system of horizontal fiscal equalisation (HFE) aimed at ensuring that all jurisdictions have the same fiscal capacity in relation to their needs. Since 1933, a statutory agency of the Commonwealth government, the Commonwealth Grants Commission, has been responsible for determining the way transfers are distributed among the States and Territories to accomplish this goal. Since 2000, the net revenue of the GST, a national value-added tax, has been distributed as general purpose payments according to a strict levelling formula determined by the Grants Commission. Discontent with this arrangement led to a review inquiry in 2012.

=== Reform of the Federation ===
The reliance of the States on financial transfers from the Commonwealth, the high degree of "overlap and duplication", and the resulting policy conflict and confusion between the levels of government regularly generates criticism and calls for "reform of the federation". The Rudd Labor government launched a series of reforms in 2009 designed to reduce the micromanaging character of specific purpose payments. Most recently, the Abbott Liberal-National Party Coalition government commissioned a White Paper on the 'Reform of the Federation'.

== Territories ==
In addition to the States, Australia has a number of Territories. Two of those are self-governing: the Australian Capital Territory (ACT) and the Northern Territory (NT). The rest are administered by the Government of Australia. All are constitutionally under the authority of the Commonwealth parliament. The power to "make laws for the government" of the Territories, assigned to the Commonwealth Parliament by s 122 of the Constitution, is not confined by any words of limitation. It is generally assumed to be a plenary power, equivalent to the "peace, order and good government" powers of self-government assigned to the States by their own Constitution Acts.

However, the Constitution makes almost no provisions as to the role of the territories within the federation. For example, the Senate was to be composed of equal numbers of Senators from each state. A particularly troublesome matter was whether this excluded territories from participation in the Senate. Two seats each have been allocated to the Northern Territory and the Australian Capital Territory, while each of the states has twelve. Although officially a separate internal territory, Jervis Bay Territory is counted as part of the Division of Fenner for the purposes of representation in the House of Representatives and the Australian Capital Territory for the purpose of representation in the Senate. Two of the three inhabited external territories, namely Christmas Island and the Cocos (Keeling) Islands, are represented by the senators and representatives of the Northern Territory. Since 2019, Norfolk Island has been represented by the Senators for the Australian Capital Territory and by the House of Representatives member for Bean (since 2019) or Canberra (2016-19). It previously had no representation due to the higher degree of autonomy it possessed under self-government until 2015.

The Northern Territory referendum of 1998 narrowly rejected a statehood proposal for the Northern Territory. Admission of the Territory as a new State raises difficult questions about how much representation in parliament would be accorded a jurisdiction with such a small population.

== Responsibilities ==
=== Federal government ===
According to the constitution, the federal government is requried to maintain the matters of:

- Defense
- Currency
- Citizenship
- Pensions and welfare payment
- Marriage and divorce
- Telecommunication and postal services
- Immigration and foreign affairs
- Nation-wide employment standards
- Trade and commerce (both international and Australian)
- Taxations and banking
- Medicare
- Copyright
- Canberra
- Lighthouses
- Statistics and censuses
- Making laws for territories such as the Northern Territory and the Australian Capital Territory.
- Giving funds for states/territories.

The responsibilities listed are what affects all Australians on a national level in general.

==== Exclusive powers ====
Executive powers are the powers that are solely reserved for the federal government and listed within the constitution. The list includes:

- Defense
- Copyright
- Currency
- Canberra
- Citizenship
- Lighthouses
- Foreign policy
- National census
- Medicare, pensions, and other sorts of payment towards Australians
- Public services (at a federal level)
- Taxes on imported goods
- Making laws for territories such as the Northern Territory and the Australian Capital Territory.
- Giving funds for states/territories.

=== States and territories ===
States and territories are expected to take care of certain responsibilities that weren't specifically listed for the federal government. They include:

- Sewage maintenance
- Hospitals and ambulances
- Police and prisons
- Schools
- Roads/railways
- Consumer affairs
- Agriculture and forests
- Housing
- Mining
- Water, gas, and other types of utilities
- Any other sorts of responsibilities that can have an impact on people on a more regional level.

==== Concurrent powers ====
Concurrent powers are powers that are jointly shared between the state and federal government. The list as follows:

- Healthcare:
  - Federal government: Pays medical professionals, including doctors.
  - State/territorial governments: Maintains hospitals.
- Environment
  - Federal government: Signs pro-environment international treaties nation-wide.
  - State/territorial governments: Protects environments, properly disposing wastes, and approving development projects.
- Taxation
  - Federal government: Taxes on income and profits.
  - State/territorial governments: Taxes (albeit more minor and insignificant then compared to the federal government) such as stamp duties and payroll taxes.
- Education
  - Federal government: Maintains after universities.
  - State/territorial governments: Maintains schools, vocational education programs, and hiring teachers.
- Trade
  - Federal government: Signs international trade treaties nation-wide.
  - State/territorial governments: Signs international trade treaties state-wide.
- Marriage/Divorce
  - Federal government: Decides on who's able to get married.
  - State/territorial governments: Registers marriages.

Exclusive powers on the other hand, refers to powers exclusively reserved for the federal government.

=== Local governments ===
Local governments are responsible for managing things on a more local level including:

- Garbage disposals, recycling, rubbish collections and sewages
- Cycleways, signs, parking, and local roads
- Sports centers, parks, and swimming pools
- Lighting
- Approval of building projects, planning towns, and inspection
- Agedcare and childcare
- Pet-related matters
- Libraries, museums, and art galleries
- Coast/land caring programs
- Passing by-laws

The amount of the LGAs per states/territories (excluding the Australian Capital Territory (ACT)) depends on the first level subdivisions in of itself as they can also pass laws to create new local government. The ACT on the otherhand, are jointly responsible for both territorial and local issues.

Local governments are funded by both federal and state finances.

== Intergovernmental relations ==
In response to the increasing overlap between the two levels of government, Australian federalism has developed extensive practices of intergovernmental relations. At the peak of these are formal meetings between the Prime Minister, the premiers of the States, the Chief Ministers of the two self-governing Territories and the president of the Australian Local Government Association. In the early 1990s, those meetings were formalised as the Council of Australian Governments (COAG). With the onset of the COVID-19 pandemic, the formal processes of COAG were set aside in favour of more frequent, immediate and collegial meetings of the heads of government christened "National Cabinet".

In 2005, the State and Territory governments established their own peak body, the Council for the Australian Federation (CAF), modelled on the Council of the Federation in Canada. However, CAF was active for only a few years and has fallen into disuse.

== See also ==
- Federation of Australia
- Australian constitutional law
- Timeline of the expansion of federal powers in Australia
