= McDougall Ireland =

McDougall & Ireland Pty. Ltd.
- Industry: Construction
- Founded: Early 1930s
- Founder: C. J. McDougall; P. J. Ireland
- Defunct: c. 1983
- Headquarters: 9 Morton Avenue, Carnegie, Melbourne, Australia

McDougall & Ireland was a building and civil engineering firm based in Melbourne, Australia.

== History ==
It was founded in the early 1930s as a home building venture between C. J. McDougall and P. J. Ireland and later extended its activities to more complex types of construction including public and defence infrastructure, olympic facilities and commercial developments. Some of the company's earlier identified builds include a double-storey residence at 9 Cosham Street in Brighton (1938) and an administration building for James Hardie at Brooklyn (1939).

=== HCV estates and wartime contributions ===
During the Second World War, McDougall & Ireland secured several contracts from the Housing Commission of Victoria (HCV). Some of these contracts were associated with the development of estates intended for a federal demobilisation program for returning soldiers. The firm's initial contract was awarded in 1939, and construction commenced shortly thereafter, continuing until 1942, when building activities were temporarily halted due to wartime restrictions. Work resumed in 1944, and to expedite the construction process, McDougall & Ireland began cutting timber directly on-site. In August 1946, a dinner was held at Prahran to commemorate the company's completion of its 1,000th home, an event attended by the Minister for Housing. McDougall & Ireland was responsible for various HCV estates in the Melbourne area including at Richmond, Fishermans Bend, Wangaratta, Preston, Sunshine, Shepparton, West Footscray, Parkville, Ashburton and Albion. In addition to these housing projects, one of the company's early contracts from the Department of Defence Co-ordination in 1941 involved the construction of two double-storey laboratories at the Maribyrnong Ordinance Factory. During this period, McDougall & Ireland also established between 100 and 300 houses at Maidstone to accommodate munitions workers.

=== Government buildings and public infrastructure ===
Although construction efforts during the war were primary focused on housing, industry and defence, McDougall & Ireland did undertake some public transport works including extension of car shed at the Essendon tram depot in 1941-42. The company grew exponentially after the war had ended, and was commonly contracted by the Federal and State governments in subsequent years. Notable post-war contracts include additions at the Commonwealth Serum Laboratories at Parkville (1947–49), brick extensions to the Collingwood Telephone Exchange (1948), an extension of the Commonwealth Offices Building (1949), construction of the Nurses Quarters (and potentially others buildings) at Box Hill Hospital (c. 1949–56), construction of a physics laboratory for CSIRO at Melbourne University (1949–50) and works at Williamstown Racecourse (1949).
