= War Precautions Act 1914 =

Australian law providing wartime powers during WWI

Parliament of Australia
- Long title: An Act to enable the Governor-General to make Regulations and Orders for the safety of the Commonwealth during the present state of war.
- Citation: No. 10 of 1914
- Royal assent: 29 October 1914
- Effective: 4 August 1914
- Repealed: 2 December 1920
- Status: Repealed

The War Precautions Act 1914 was an Act of the Parliament of Australia which gave the Government of Australia special powers for the duration of World War I and for six months afterwards.

It was held by the High Court of Australia in Farey v Burvett that during wartime, the scope of the federal Government's power under Section 51(vi) of the Australian Constitution (under which the Act was passed) expands to meet the exigencies of wartime. As a result, the responsibility for defence policy lies solely with the Parliament and the Executive. There were 3,442 prosecutions under the Act, almost all of which were successful.

== The Act ==
Under the Act, which was to be read as one with the Defence Act 1903–1912, the Commonwealth could make regulations "for securing the public safety and the defence of the Commonwealth", including:

- preventing espionage and other activity that could "jeopardize the success of the operations of any of His Majesty's forces," securing "the safety of any means of communication", and preventing "the spread of reports likely to cause disaffection or alarm" (the breach of which was subject to trial by court-martial)
- prohibiting aliens from entering the Commonwealth, or requiring their deportation therefrom
- prohibiting aliens from residing or remaining in a specified place, or requiring them to reside and remain in a specified place (Note: such as the Torrens Island Concentration Camp)
- regulating the registration and change of abode of aliens, and any travelling and trading done by them
- imposing similar restriction on naturalsed citizens as could be imposed on aliens
- requiring "any person to disclose any information in his possession as to any matter"
- preventing "money or goods being sent out of Australia" except under certain conditions

Later amendments expanded the scope of regulations to cover:

- the restriction the transmission abroad of all written communication other than through the post
- the ownership of property held by enemy aliens, and the regulation or restriction of any trade or business operated by them
- the conditions (ie, times, place and prices) of the disposal or use of any thing
- the requisitioning of any thing

From 1915, the scale of punishments for offences under the Act was:

- on summary conviction: a fine of up to £100 or imprisonment up to six months, or both
- on indictment: a fine of any amount or imprisonment for any term, or both
- on court-martial: the same punishment as if the offender had been subject to military
- where, on indictment or court-martial, an offence was committed with the intention of assisting the enemy: the person was liable to suffer death

Regulations issued under the Act required all persons over 16 years of age, on leaving Australia, to possess a passport.

=== Other wartime legislation ===
Although the Act possessed very broad scope, it was not omnipotent. Other Acts were passed by the Parliament during the war relating to:

- criminal and civil sanctions for trading with the enemy,
- cancellation of commercial contracts with firms in enemy countries, and
- levying of an income tax

== Controversies ==
During the conscription referendums of 1916 and 1917, a regulation that banned statements likely to prejudice recruiting was used to hamper the anti-conscription campaign. Almost any anti-conscriptionist speech could be construed as offending, and a number of prominent anti-conscriptionists were charged, including John Curtin.

When coal-miners in New South Wales went on strike in 1916, the Act was used to empower the Attorney-General to order the men back to work. The following year, a nationwide strike of Waterfront workers was defeated by the passing of a regulation that deprived the Waterside Workers Federation of preferences in seven of the busiest ports in Australia. Although in many cases the use of the Act in settling labour disputes could be seen as necessary for the war effort, some other uses appeared calculated to suppress the labour movement. For example, in September 1918 the Act was used to ban the use of the red flag, a traditional labour emblem.

On a number of occasions, the Aliens Restrictions Orders made under the act were used to deport radical left-wing activists, particularly members of the Industrial Workers of the World (IWW), without trial. In July 1918, New Zealand-born IWW leader Tom Barker was deported to Chile. The following year, strike leader Paul Freeman was secretly deported in a case that became a cause celebre for the labour movement.

Following the end of the war, the Act's continued operation led to a series of violent demonstrations known as the Red Flag Riots.

== Demise ==
The Act was later repealed by the War Precautions Act Repeal Act 1920. (Note: of which one provision still remains, currently cited as the Protection of Word "Anzac" Act 1920 (Act 54). 1920.)

== See also ==
- Military history of Australia during World War I
