= Commonwealth Grants Commission =

Agency of the Australian government that assists states with GST and other payments

Statutory authority overview
- Formed: 1933
- Jurisdiction: Commonwealth of Australia
- Minister responsible: Jim Chalmers MP, Treasurer of Australia
- Statutory authority executive: Michael Callaghan AM PSM, Chairperson (until 24 June 2025)
- Key document: section 96 of the Australian Constitution
- Website: www.cgc.gov.au

The Commonwealth Grants Commission is an Australian independent statutory body that advises the Australian Government on financial assistance to the states and territories of Australia under section 96 of the Australian Constitution. The commission was established in July 1933 by the Lyons government during the Great Depression to provide impartial advice on the distribution of federal government grants to the states. The commission operates under the Commonwealth Grants Commission Act 1973, and is responsible for measuring the relative fiscal capacity of each state and territory.

The Commission recommends how the revenues raised from the goods and services tax (GST) should be distributed to each state and territory to achieve horizontal fiscal equalisation, a central feature of the Australian federation.

== References to Commission ==
The Commission responds to references from the Australian Treasurer, which are generally requests for calculating appropriate ratios of per capita grants for distributing general revenue assistance from the Australian government to the states and territories. The details of these references are usually negotiated between the Commonwealth, state and territory treasury departments before being formally issued by the Treasurer.

The Commission reports to the Australian government and then provides copies to the states and territories. The recommendations are then considered at the annual meetings of the Treasurers of the Commonwealth, states and territories.

On 31 March 2016, the commission received a reference to inquire into and report by 7 April 2016 on the per capita relativities to be used to distribute GST revenue among the states and the territories in 2016–17.

Every five years, the Commission undertakes a review of the methodology underlying the commission's advice to the government on the relative fiscal capacity of each state and territory. The last reference was given on 29 November 2016 and the review was completed in March 2020. The purpose of reviews is to determine the most appropriate methods and data for measuring the relative fiscal capacity of states and territories.

== List of chairs ==
Name	Term start	Term end
Frederic Eggleston	July 1933	November 1941
Richard Charles Mills	November 1941	November 1945
Alexander Fitzgerald	November 1945	September 1960
Philip Phillips	October 1960	September 1966
Leslie Melville	October 1966	September 1974
Rae Else-Mitchell	October 1974	June 1989
Dick Rye	July 1989	June 1999
Alan Morris	July 1999	?
Greg Smith	?	June 2020
Michael Callaghan	June 2020	

== See also ==
- Fiscal imbalance in Australia
- Council of Australian Governments

General:

- Equalization payments
- Fiscal imbalance

Federal budget:

- Australian federal budget
