= Private copying levy =

Tax on recordable media such as a blank tape

A private copying levy (also known as blank media tax or levy) is a government-mandated scheme in which a special tax or levy (additional to any general sales tax) is charged on purchases of recordable media. Such taxes are in place in various countries and the income is typically allocated to the developers of "content". (A distinction is sometimes made between "tax" and "levy" based on the recipient of the accumulated funds; taxes are received by a government, while levies are received by a private body, such as a copyright collective.)

Levy system may operate in principle as a system of collectivisation, partially replacing a property approach of sale of individual units.

== History ==
Such levies were first introduced in Germany in the 1960s. With the advent of the audio cassette, legislators were persuaded that cassette recorders would decimate sales of records as friend after friend would then make copies of only one purchased album. Levies today are assessed on recordable compact discs, a form of media that did not exist when levies were first conceived. Although the bulk of unrecorded compact discs are actually used in the computing industry, they are still "taxed" to provide a revenue stream to the recording industry.

A common misconception is that levies are compensation for illegal copying such as file sharing. This is incorrect, however, levies are only intended to compensate for private copying that is legally allowed in many jurisdictions. For example, uploading a purchased CD on to another personal device such as a laptop or MP3 player. Generally, legislators allow private copies for two reasons: firstly, because otherwise, the enforcement would be unfeasible for private reasons, and secondly, because the administrative burden would be disproportionate.

=== European Union review ===
In the European Union, the legal basis for levies is the 2001 InfoSoc Directive. It mandates that EU countries must put in place a compensation scheme to compensate rightsholders for harm caused where there is a private copy exemption.

In 2015, the European Parliament approved a non-binding resolution (Reda Report) asking a review of the levy in the European Union, building on previous resolutions and studies. However, there has been no change in the EU legal framework since. Industry players continue to lobby for reform of the system which they argue is outdated and does not reflect the rise in streaming services which has caused a drop in private copying.

== Questions on fairness ==
A difficulty that arises is devising a mechanism for distributing the proceeds to copyright holders that is considered "fair" by all copyright holders and consumers. Fairer methods should involve extensive sampling of users to determine actual copying behaviour, or alternatively paying all musicians at a simple flat-rate.

While the main aim of levy systems is to compensate authors for losses due to private copying, some part of the collected money is also used for general cultural funding purposes. In Germany this is required by law. This funding is usually distributed by the same entities (collecting societies) that distribute the levies to individual authors.

A further problem is to find a proper tariff base for levies. Conceivably the levy may be a percentage of storage media sales price (e.g. 3% in the US). The implication of such a scheme is however that the author gets less as technology becomes less expensive. But a fixed price based on storage capacity is not fair either, as for instance a smartphone can be used to store copyrighted content such as films or music, but also large of non-copyrighted content, such as personal photos.

An implementation question that arises is whether the tax applies to any type of copyrighted work or is restricted to a limited field such as music. If it is restricted then the issue arises of how to collect the tax on media which can also be used for other purposes. The options include:

- Collecting the tax on all media, regardless of the end use, and ignoring the injustice to purchasers with non-covered uses.
- Allowing taxed and untaxed media to be sold, but with only the taxed media providing the copyright-relaxation benefits.
- Collecting the tax on all media but allowing purchasers to claim a refund for media applied to non-covered uses.

Contrary Fairness arguments

- Although these complexities make the systems of levies are far from perfect they do have some advantages related to fairness in that since there is compensation for private copying whereas in countries where there is no levies, there is a substantial amount of copying taking place without any due compensation being made.
- With respect to fairness in countries with the levy everyone is shares in the financial burden caused by the levy. In countries that do not have the levy, many people are copying music and never receive any reprimands while others are made an example and prosecuted. This is the similar argument that non-proponents to the levy system use to show fault. They advocate that if the levy cannot be precisely applied to the people that are private copying, it is a faulty system. Likewise, if one cannot reprimand all people that are copying illegally and not compensating the music industry, this is also a faulty system. One system over subscribes, the other undersubscribes, both have faults.
- Finally, those countries that do not have private copying laws are in fact making many of their citizens criminals. A law which makes potentially more than 50% of the population criminals does not seem to be a fair business practice. Lawyers rather than artists may well be the greatest beneficiaries in non-private copying countries. This argument assumes that private copying can only be allowed with a levy.

== Legal effects ==
It is theorized that such levy may be linked to a corresponding relaxation of copyright law, by permitting the recording of copyrighted works on media for which the tax has been paid. However, there is little evidence to support this theory. On the contrary, lobbyists representing publishers and copyright holders have increased pressures to implement more restrictive laws, even on countries that have implemented private copying levy. In 2007, it was reported that International Intellectual Property Alliance put 23 of the world's 30 most populous countries into Priority Watch List, even though the United States, which was not in the list, has laws that are more liberal than the laws from the countries within the list.

Even when restricting levy system to devices that primarily play music, this itself creates loopholes that prevents collecting levies from cellphones, PDAs, and other all-in-one portable electronic devices. As a result, copyright holders will have to rely on even more laws to collect levy, and to increase rates of already levied product to recover perceived losses, which run against the political trends toward eliminating levy systems.

== Regulations ==
Examples of countries operating such schemes:

=== Australia ===
Australia had a public levy on cassette tapes. The legislation establishing the levy was passed in 1989, challenged in the High Court of Australia in Australian Tape Manufacturers Association Ltd v Commonwealth. The court found the tax legal even though it went to private sources because it served a public purpose.

Copyright Amendment Act 1989 (Cth) introduced the Levy on blank tapes but was later repealed by Copyright Amendment (Re-Enactment) Act 1993 following the "blank tapes levy case" in the HCA in 1993.

=== Belgium ===
In Belgium a fee is charged on both blank media and recording equipment which is passed on to "Auvibel", which is in charge of distributing the funds. As of 1 February 2010, these fees are applicable for the following:

- Equipment with integrated carrier:
  - MP3/MP4 player, cellphone with MP3/MP4 functionality:
    - capacity is less or equal to 2GB: €1.00
    - capacity is higher than 2GB and less or equal to 16GB: €2.50
    - capacity is higher than 16GB: €3.00
  - TV, Hi-Fi, combined DVD writer and videorecorder, multifunctional DVD home cinema, set top box, multimediacenter:
    - capacity is less or equal to 256GB: €3.30
    - capacity is higher than 256GB and less or equal to 1TB: €10.75
    - capacity is higher than 1TB: €13.00
- Non-integrated equipment with integrated carrier:
  - DVD recorder, DVD reader, CD writer, videorecorder, DVD home cinema:
    - capacity is less or equal to 256GB: €3.30
    - capacity is higher than 256GB and less or equal to 1TB: €10.75
    - capacity is higher than 1TB: €13.00
- For the following equipment, without integrated carrier, that are not integrate-able in a computer and work standalone, have a fee of €2.00:
  - Hi-Fi with radio-cassette-CD
  - Combined DVD writer and videorecorder
  - Combined DVD reader and videorecorder
  - Portable radio-cassette recorder
  - Combined portable radio-cassette-CD
  - TV and combined DVD writer
  - DVD recorder
  - Cassette deck
  - Videorecorder
  - CD writer
  - MiniDisc writer
  - CD audio to MiniDisc writer
- Digital carriers:
  - Memorystick, memorycard:
    - capacity is less or equal to 2GB: €0.15
    - capacity is higher than 2GB and less or equal to 16GB: €0.50
    - capacity is higher than 16GB: €1.35
  - External hard drive:
    - capacity is less or equal to 256GB: €1.30
    - capacity is higher than 256GB and less or equal to 1TB: €6.75
    - capacity is higher than 1TB: €9.00
  - blank CD-R/RW, MiniCD-R/RW, MiniDVD-R/RW, MiniDisc, audiocassette DAT: €0.12/disc
  - blank DVD+/-R/RW: €0.40/disc
- Analogue carriers:
  - audiocassette, audiotape, videocassette 8mm: €0.12
  - videocassette: €0.40

=== Canada ===
A blank media levy was introduced in Canada in 1997, by the addition of Part VIII, "Private Copying", to the Canadian Copyright Act. The power to set rates and to set the distribution allocation is vested in the Copyright Board of Canada. The Copyright Board has handed the task of collecting and distributing the funds to the Canadian Private Copying Collective, which is a non-profit private organization.

In Canada:

- The levy applies to "blank audio recording media", such as CD-Rs.
- The levy is paid by importers and manufacturers of such media sold within Canada (and typically passed on to the retailer, and passed on to the purchaser).
- With the exception of the zero-rating exemption, the levy is collected regardless of the purchaser's end use of the media.
- The private copying levy, less CPCC operating costs, is distributed as per the Copyright Board's allocation as: 58.2% to eligible authors and publishers, 23.8% to eligible performers and 18.0% to eligible record companies.
- The Canadian Private Copying Collective has developed a method by which the proceeds are distributed to rights holders based on commercial radio airplay and commercial sales samples, ignoring radio/college airplay and independent record sales not logged by Soundscan. This method has been criticised as favouring major-label artists at the expense of the long-tail. As of September 7, 2007 over one hundred million dollars has been distributed.
- In conjunction with the levy, the Copyright Act allows individuals to make copies of sound recordings for their own private, non-commercial use. They may not distribute the copy.
- In 2005, the Federal Court of Appeal overruled a 2003 Copyright Board decision which had applied the blank media levy to MP3 players such as Apple Inc.'s iPod, on the basis that such devices did not qualify as "audio recording medium" as per the Copyright Act definition. Before this, the proposed rates were C$2 for players with less than 1 GB of capacity, $15 for players up to 15 GB, and $25 for players 15 GB and over.
- On February 12, 2007, CPCC asked the Copyright Board of Canada to reintroduce the levy of $5 to $75, this time onto the memory component of the digital audio recorders (such as MP3 players) in Canada. In addition, CPCC also proposed levies of $2 to $10 for memory cards (since withdrawn), 8 cent increases to CD, CD-R Audio, CD-RW Audio and MiniDiscs. Certain parties objected to this tariff based on the 2005 Federal Court of Appeal precedent and brought a preliminary motion before the Copyright Board that would have prevented that part of the tariff application from being considered. The Copyright Board dismissed this preliminary motion in July 2007.
- In September 2007, an application for judicial review was brought before the Federal Court of Appeal to appeal the Copyright Board's dismissal. On October 26, 2007, the court granted the Canadian Recording Industry Association's request to intervene in the private copying/iPod levy judicial review. Some argue that CRIA wanted to limit the scope of the private copying levy, given that it legalizes copying for the private use of the person making the copy, possibly regardless of whether the source is non-infringing or not.
- In January 2008, the Federal Court of Appeal overturned the Copyright Board's July 2007 decision, stating that its previous ruling in the 2005 Canadian Private Copying Collective v. Canadian Storage Media Alliance case is dispositive authority for the proposition that "the Copyright Board has no legal authority to certify a tariff on digital audio recorders or on the memory permanently embedded in digital audio recorders."

Canada's current private copying levies are as follows: $0.29 per unit for CD-R, CD-RW, CD-R Audio, CD-RW Audio disks. The Pirate Party of Canada, or the PPCA, has called for the scrapping the levy, as there are plenty of non-piracy related uses for CDs and it is unjust to punish Canadians who do not use them for these purposes.

=== Finland ===
Finland had a blank media levy 1984–2015. From 2015 on the funds come directly from the Ministry of Culture's budget.

=== Germany ===
The world's first private copying system was created in Germany in 1965. It was a result of earlier successful litigation by GEMA against an audio equipment manufacturer in GEMA v. Grundig.

=== Luxembourg ===
Luxembourg is the only EU member state on the continent without a private copying levy, making it a popular "copying levy haven" for blank media buyers from countries such as France and Germany.

=== Netherlands ===
In the Netherlands a fee is charged on blank media which is passed on to "Stichting Thuiskopie" (Foundation Homecopy), which is in charge of distributing the funds. Fees for January 1, 2021 until December 31, 2023, are as follows:

- PC / Laptop / notebook / server / mediacenter: €2,70
- Tablet: €2,20
- Smartphone: €7,30
- Portable audio- / videoplayer: €2,10
- Settopbox with hard disk / HDD-recorder: €3,80
- E-reader: €1,10
- External Hard Disk Drive (HDD), Solid State Disk (SSD) and USB flash drive >= 256 GB: €1,00
- USB flash drive < 256 GB: €0,50
- Wearables with storage capabilities: €0,60

=== Portugal ===
Portugal established a levy on CDs and DVDs in 1998, with modifications to the law in 2004, 2015, 2017 and 2020.

Fees, as of August 2025, are as follows:

- Devices, equipments and technical reproduction devices
  - Inkjet fotocopiers and multifunction devices: €5
  - Laser fotocopiers and multifunction devices
    - Up to 40 pages per minute: €10
    - Over 40 pages per minute: €20
  - Scanners and other equipment dedicated exclusively to scanning: €2
  - Inkjet printers: €2.50
  - Laser printers: €7.50
- Equipment, devices and media
  - Analog equipment and devices
    - Audio recorders: €0.20
    - Video recorders: €0.20
  - Digital devices and equipment that does not include memory or hard drives
    - CD recorders: €1
    - DVD recorders: €2
    - CD+DVD recorders: €3
    - Blu-ray recorders: €3
  - Storage devices and media
    - Physical analog media, such as audio cassettes and similar: €0.10
    - Physical analog media, such as video cassettes and similar: €0.10
    - Non-rewritable CD: €0.05
    - CD single: €0.05
    - Minidisc: €0.05
    - CD-RW: €0.10
    - DVD-R: €0.10
    - DVD-RW: €0.20
    - DVD-RAM: €0.20
    - Blu-ray discs: €0.20
    - USB flash: €0.016/GB (capped at €7.50)
    - Memory cards: €0.016/GB (capped at €7.50)
    - Memory and hard drives integrated in devices with content copying capabilities: €0.016/GB (capped at €15)
    - External hard drives denominated 'multimedia' or hard drives that include one or more data outputs or inputs: €0.016/GB (capped at €15)
    - Memories and hard drives integrated into devices with a television function and into devices that provide the interface between the television signal and the television, including decoders or devices for accessing subscription television services, that allow the storage of sounds and animated images: €0.016/GB (capped at €15)
    - Memories or hard drives integrated into computers that are not included in the previous point: €0.004/GB (capped at €7.50)
    - Internal or external hard drives that depend on a computer or other equipment or devices to perform the playback function and that allow the storage of any protected works, performances, or other content: €0.004/GB (capped at €7.50)
    - Memories and hard drives integrated into devices dedicated to the playback, reading, and storage of phonograms, any musical works, and other sound content in compressed format: €0.20/GB (capped at €15)
    - Memories and hard drives integrated into mobile phones that allow the storage of any protected works, performances, or other content: €0.12/GB (capped at €15)
    - Memories or hard drives integrated into multimedia tablet devices that have touch screens and allow the storage of any protected works, performances, or other content: €0.12/GB (capped at €15)

Only one fair compensation payment, under one of the points mentioned in the previous list, which results in the highest value, may be applied to the same device, apparatus, or medium.

=== Russian Federation ===
Article 1245 of Civil Code of Russian Federation "Remuneration for free reproduction of phonograms and audiovisual products for private purposes" ("Вознаграждение за свободное воспроизведение фонограмм и аудиовизуальных произведений в личных целях") mandates a fee, which is to be distributed in the following proportion: 40% to the authors, 30% to the singers, 30% to the manufacturers of the media. In practice, this fee had not been charged until after the Regulation of the Government of Russian Federation 829 from October 14, 2010, which mandated a uniform 1% tax on computers, blank optical disks, memory sticks, TVs, video and audio recorders, radios, mobile phones, etc. The controversial decision of the government to award the collected funds to the Russian Union of Rights-Holders for further distribution was criticized by the public and disputed in a lawsuit.

=== Sweden ===
In Sweden there is a fee called "privatkopieringsersättning" (private copy remuneration) earlier called "kassettersättning" (cassette tape remuneration) on storage media. The levy is handled by Copyswede. The extent of what is included in the copy levy has changed several times the past decade. As of the 1st of November 2020 and going forwards the copy levy is determined to be :

- Units with built-in storage including stationary computers, laptops, tablets, and gaming consoles exceeding 2 GB:
  - 1 SEK / GB with a maximum amount of 75 SEK per unit.
- Smartphones & cellphones with built-in and accompanying loose storage exceeding 2 GB:
  - 1 SEK / GB with a maximum amount of 75 SEK per unit.
    - Built-in and accompanying loose storage (e.g. an microSD card) are combined for purposes of calculating the levy.
- Storage devices with capacities exceeding 2 GB including internal hard drives, external hard drives, and USB memory sticks with a cap of 30 SEK per unit at 1025 GB and larger:

Storage capacity	Levy per unit
> 2-7 GB [sic]	2 SEK
8-16 GB	6 SEK
17-256 GB	12 SEK
257-1024 GB	24 SEK
≥ 1025 GB	30 SEK (maximum per unit)

- MP3 player, set-top box with built-in hard drive, DVD player with built-in hard drive, TV with built-in hard drive and other media players with a built-in hard drive:
  - 1 SEK / GB with a maximum of 120 SEK per unit
- Recordable CDs and DVDs:
  - CD-r All up to 900 MB 0.60 SEK
  - CD-rw All up to 900 MB 0.95 SEK
  - DVD-r / + r 4.7 GB 2.65 SEK
  - DVD-rw / + rw 4.7 GB 4.25 SEK
  - DVD frame 4.7 GB 4.25 SEK
  - DVD-r / + r double layer 8.5 GB 4.80 SEK
- Analog audio cassettes (C cassettes), VHS cassettes (E cassettes), minidisc and cd-r audio (tariff applies by each minute of recording space):
  - C-cassette 2.5 öre
  - Minidisc 2 öre
  - Cd-r audio 2 öre
  - E-cassette (VHS) 2.5 öre

=== Switzerland ===
- Tax on recordable DVD (GT 4c):
  - CHF 0.31 per recordable DVD
  - CHF 0.88 per rewritable DVD
  - CHF 0.33 per recordable Blu-Ray
  - CHF 0.93 per rewritable Blu-Ray
- Tax on digital storage media packaged inside audio and audiovisual recording devices (GT 4d):
  - Memory capacity up to 4 GB, CHF 0.63 per GB
  - Memory capacity between 4 GB and 8 GB, CHF 0.572 per GB
  - Memory capacity between 8 GB and 16 GB, CHF 0.332 per GB
  - Memory capacity between 16 GB and 32 GB, CHF 0.2552 per GB
  - Memory capacity over 32 GB, CHF 0.1992 per GB
- Compensation for the transfer of use of set-top box with memory and vPVR (GT 12):
  - CHF 1.00 per month and subscriber if the following charges do not apply
  - CHF 0.13 per month and subscriber if free or part of the basic package
  - CHF 0.55 per month and subscriber for monthly subscription fee up to a max of CHF 6.50
- Tax on digital (recordable) memory in cell phones:
  - Memory capacity up to 4 GB, CHF 0.108 per GB
  - Memory capacity up to 8 GB, CHF 0.090 per GB
  - Memory capacity up to 16 GB, CHF 0.072 per GB
  - Memory capacity up to 32 GB, CHF 0.063 per GB
  - Memory capacity up to 64 GB, CHF 0.052 per GB
  - Memory capacity up to 128 GB, CHF 0.050 per GB

=== United States ===
==== Audio home recording in general ====
17 U.S.C. § 1008, as legislated by the Audio Home Recording Act of 1992, says that non-commercial copying by consumers of digital and analog musical recordings is not copyright infringement. Non-commercial includes such things as resale not in the course of business, perhaps of normal use working copies which are no longer wanted. It is unlikely to include resale of copies in bulk; Napster tried to use the Section 1008 defense but was rejected because it was a business.

From House Report No. 102-873(I), September 17, 1992: "In the case of home taping, the [Section 1008] exemption protects all noncommercial copying by consumers of digital and analog musical recordings" .

From House Report No. 102-780(I), August 4, 1992: "In short, the reported legislation [Section 1008] would clearly establish that consumers cannot be sued for making analog or digital audio copies for private noncommercial use".

The United States music industry administers the Audio Home Recording Act and foreign hometaping royalties for artists on US sound recordings as well as US record labels. These royalties were previously administered by the Alliance of Artists and Recording Companies (AARC) for Featured Artists and Copyright Owners until it ceased operations in 2021 and is now administered by SoundExchange, ASCAP/BMI/SESAC for writers, Harry Fox Agency for publishers, and The AFM/SAG-AFTRA Intellectual Property Rights Distribution Fund (Joint venture of AFM and SAG-AFTRA) for non-featured artists. All societies also collect foreign remuneration for their respective funds.

==== Blank music CDs and recorders ====
17 U.S.C. § 1008 bars copyright infringement action and 17 U.S.C. § 1003 provides for a royalty of 2% of the initial transfer price for devices and 3% for media. The royalty rate in 17 U.S.C. § 1004 was established by the Fairness in Music Licensing Act of 1998. This only applies to CDs which are labeled and sold for music use ("music" CD-Rs); they do not apply to blank computer CDs, even though they can be (and often are) used to record or "burn" music from the computer to CD. The royalty also applies to stand-alone consumer-grade CD recorders, but not to professional CD recorders or CD burners used with computers. Most recently, portable satellite radio recording devices contribute to this royalty fund.

Thanks to a precedent established in a 1998 lawsuit involving the Rio PMP300 player, most MP3 players are deemed "computer peripherals" and are not subject to a royalty of this type in the U.S.

Currently, private copy royalties are generated in the US by the sale of "blank CDs and personal audio devices, media centers, satellite radio devices, and car audio systems that have recording capabilities."

=== United Kingdom ===
Currently there is no proper private copy exception in the United Kingdom, there is only a narrow exception regarding broadcast time-shifting (s70(1) of the Copyright, Designs and Patents Act 1988 (CDPA)).

On 1 June 2014, the UK implemented art. 5(2)b of the Infosoc Directive via the Copyright and Rights in Performance (Personal Copies for Private Use) Regulations 2014. This provided an exception limited to the personal use, to the owners of a personal copy and with the exclusion of indirectly commercial uses. It did not provide for compensation. The UK Government's view was that "levies or other compensation are neither required nor desirable in the context of a narrow provision that causes minimal harm. Levies are an unnecessary and inefficient tax on consumers. They are unfair to consumers in that they are payable regardless of the use to which a levied device (for example a hard disk) is put and regardless of whether a user has already paid for the copies they store on a device. Furthermore, particularly in the current economic climate, it is not right to extract more money from the pockets of hard pressed consumers." The British Academy of Songwriters, Composers and Authors (BASCA), the Musicians' Union, and UK Music challenged the introduction of these regulations, and brought an application for judicial review. Their application succeeded when, in June 2015, the High Court ruled that the regulations were unlawful because of a flawed impact assessment.

== See also ==
- Voluntary Collective Licensing
- Audio Home Recording Act
- Collective rights management
