= Section 96 of the Constitution of Australia =

Section 96 of the Constitution of Australia authorises the Australian (Commonwealth) Parliament to grant financial assistance to any state on the terms and conditions that it sees fit, subject to acceptance by the state(s) concerned. The expanded use of the power under section 96 has added to Australia's vertical fiscal imbalance and enabled the Commonwealth to have a significant influence over matters that would otherwise be constitutionally State responsibilities.

== Text ==
During a period of ten years after the establishment of the Commonwealth and thereafter until the Parliament otherwise provides, the Parliament [of the Commonwealth] may grant financial assistance to any State on such terms and conditions as the Parliament thinks fit.

== Tied grants ==
Section 51 of the Australian Constitution enumerates the legislative powers of Commonwealth, with the residual powers being those of the States. However, section 96 provides the Commonwealth with the power to grant money to any state. These monetary grants are typically tied to certain terms and conditions (often legislative) that the states must adhere to in order to receive the grant. As these grants are linked to a particular purpose, they are known as 'tied grants'. In practice, section 96 has provided the Commonwealth parliament with the ability to influence policy matters that lie within the residual powers of the States (e.g. education, health, water, etc.).

== Vertical fiscal imbalance ==
Although the Australian Constitution allows both States and the Commonwealth to raise revenue, subsequent political developments and judicial interpretations have limited state taxing powers and led to Australia's vertical fiscal imbalance. The Commonwealth has significantly greater revenue-raising abilities than the states, which have spending responsibilities. The result is that states rely on Commonwealth grants to fund state-provided services such as schools and hospitals. The power to distribute funds to states on conditions has expanded the sphere of Commonwealth power through dictating policy through conditional grants. This limits the autonomy and power of the states in controlling policy.

This is largely due to the uniform federal system of income tax that was introduced in 1942 in accordance with s51(ii). Additionally, Section 51(iv) grants the Commonwealth control over state borrowings, furthering the reliance of the States on Commonwealth funding. The vertical fiscal imbalance, alongside section 96 of the Australian Constitution has effectively extended the Commonwealth's powers beyond those enumerated in section 51 of the Australian Constitution and other explicit enumerations of Commonwealth legislative power (e.g. section 52 and section 90).

== Use of s.96 to take over State income taxing power ==
Before 1942, consistent with the concurrent power in s51(ii), both the states and the Commonwealth levied income taxes. However, in 1942 the Commonwealth attempted to gain a monopoly on income taxes by passing the Income Tax Act 1942 and the States Grants (Income Tax Reimbursement) Act 1942. The Income Tax Act imposed a Commonwealth income tax, while the Grants Act provided Commonwealth funding to the States on condition that they do not imposed an income tax, based on section 96 of the Australian Constitution.

The Income Tax Act 1942 set high tax rates that reflected the combined current Commonwealth and State taxes and made imposing State tax unattractive or impossible. This was because the Income Tax Assessment Act 1942 said that individuals had to pay Commonwealth tax before State taxes. In effect, the scheme meant either the States had to accept grants and stop taxing, or decline grants and try to collect tax at rates which were unsustainable.

The High Court has interpreted the expression "terms and conditions" very broadly. In South Australia v Commonwealth (1942) 65 CLR 373 (the First Uniform Tax case) the scheme was upheld. There was an opinion that the scheme, introduced in 1942, was upheld on the basis of the defence power in section 51(vi). The Commonwealth re-enacted the scheme after the war. There was a second constitutional challenge, and the scheme was again upheld on the basis of section 96, in Victoria v Commonwealth (1957) 99 CLR 575 (the Second Uniform Tax case).

== See also ==
- Commonwealth Grants Commission
- Fiscal imbalance in Australia
