= Bryan Pape =

Australian academic

Bryan Pape was a senior lecturer at the University of New England, New South Wales, Australia and a former office holder and member of the National Party of Australia, who in Pape v Commissioner of Taxation (April 2009) lost his challenge to the constitutional legality of the Kevin Rudd Government's proposed $7.7 billion tax bonus payments as part of the $42 billion economic stimulus package in the High Court of Australia.

A fervent and long-time believer in federalism and state's rights, Pape argued the case himself as a "concerned lawyer". He argued that the $900 stimulus payments anticipated to be made to 7.4 million Australians beginning 6 April were not a valid extension of the Commonwealth's taxation powers but a gift, and the Commonwealth has no constitutional power to spend consolidated revenue on gifts under section 81 and 83 of the Australian Constitution.

Whilst Pape has disagreed with previous government stimulus packages, he then had no standing to take the Commonwealth to court. The $900 tax rebate is the first that he would be eligible to receive and thus enabled him to take the matter to the High Court. While the High Court unanimously rejected the Commonwealth's submission that it could rely on its use of s 81 of the Constitution to support the expenditure, it upheld the Commonwealth's submission that it could do so by relying on the executive power (s.61 of the Constitution) and the incidental power (s.51 (xxxix) of the Constitution) by a thin majority of 4:3. (See (2009) 238 CLR 1.)

Pape believed that if he were successful, "the Government could still give the bonus just through... giving a rebate and letting the money flow through the PAYG system."

Pape died on 27 April 2014 at his home in Armidale.
