= Farey v Burvett =

Judgement of the High Court of Australia

- Court: High Court of Australia
- Decided: 8 June 1916
- Citations: [1916] HCA 36, (1916) 21 CLR 433

Court membership
- Judges sitting: Griffith CJ, Barton, Isaacs, Higgins Gavan Duffy, Powers & Rich JJ

Case opinions
- (5:2) The defence powers of the Commonwealth were sufficient to permit the Governor-General to make regulations and orders fixing the maximum price for bread.per Griffith CJ, Barton, Isaacs, Higgins & Powers JJ.

Farey v Burvett is an early High Court of Australia case concerning the extent of the defence power of the Commonwealth. The majority of the Court took an expansive view of the defence power in a time of war, holding that the defence power extended to fixing the maximum price for bread. The Court adopted a different approach to the interpretation of the defence power which emphasised the purpose of the legislation, the defence of Australia, rather than the subject matter. As the law fell within a Commonwealth power, whether the law was necessary or appropriate for the defence of Australia was a matter for Parliament.

== Background ==
=== The constitutional powers ===
The Constitution deals with defence in a number of related provisions, relevantly providing that :

51 The Parliament shall, subject to this Constitution, have power to make laws for the peace, order, and good government of the Commonwealth with respect to:

(vi) the naval and military defence of the Commonwealth and of the several States, and the control of the forces to execute and maintain the laws of the Commonwealth;
(xxxii) the control of railways with respect to transport for the naval and military purposes of the Commonwealth;

114. A State shall not, without the consent of the Parliament of the Commonwealth, raise or maintain any naval or military force ...

119. The Commonwealth shall protect every State against invasion and, on the application of the Executive Government of the State, against domestic violence.

The effect of these provisions is that the defence power is exclusive to the Commonwealth.

=== The Act, regulations and order ===
In October 1914 the Australian Parliament enacted the War Precautions Act 1914 which authorized the Governor-General to "make regulations for securing the public safety and the defence of the Commonwealth, and for conferring such powers and imposing such duties as he thinks fit, with reference thereto, upon the Naval Board and the Military Board and the members of the Naval and Military Forces of the Commonwealth".

Pursuant to this power, the Governor-General (in Council) made the War Precautions (Prices Adjustment) Regulations 1916, which proclaimed various areas, including "(c) The area comprised within a radius of ten miles from the General Post Office, Melbourne, in the State of Victoria." and provided that

9.(1) The Governor-General may from time to time, on the recommendation of the Board—

(a) determine the maximum prices which may be charged for flour and bread sold in any proclaimed area;
(b) determine the conditions under which flour and bread may be sold therein.

(2) Any such determination shall be published in the Gazette, and shall from the date specified in the Gazette have the force of law.

The matter proceeded at a remarkable pace. The regulations were proclaimed on 24 March 1916, the determination was published in the Gazette on 10 April 1916 fixing the maximum price for 4 pounds of bread to be sold in Melbourne at 6 1/2 pence. Ten days later on 20 April Farey sold four pounds of bread at the price of 7 pence. He was convicted on 12 May and fined £2 plus £6 6s costs.

On 23 May 1916, after Farey was convicted but before the matter was heard by the High Court, the Parliament amended the War Precautions Act, for reasons that are not apparent from the Hansard, with retrospective effect from the commencement of the war. The amendments themselves suggest that there may be some question as to whether the broad regulation power was sufficient to support fixing the maximum price of bread and this was directly provided for with retrospective operation

(1A.) The Governor-General may make such regulations as he thinks desirable for the more effectual prosecution of the war, or the more effectual defence of the Commonwealth or of the realm, prescribing and regulating-...

(b) the conditions (including times, places, and prices) of the disposal or use of any property goods articles or things of any kind ...

The matter was heard by the High Court starting on 31 May and the decision published on 8 June 1916.

== Argument ==
Farey was represented by Sir William Irvine KC and Hayden Starke who argued that the existence of war did not supersede the express limitations of the Constitution, including the reserved powers doctrine, and the defence power was the same whether there be peace or war. The law of necessity overrides the constitutional limitations, however whether the necessity exists is a question of fact to be determined by the courts. The defence power did not extend to matters which are indirectly conducive to the naval or military defence.

Burvett, an Inspector in the Commonwealth Treasury, argued that defence including attacking all resources at the disposal of the enemy and conserving the resources of the Commonwealth. The export of the wheat surplus was desirable both for supplying troops and funding the war.

== Decision ==
The majority of the High Court, Griffith CJ, Barton, Isaacs, Higgins & Powers JJ held that the defence powers in sub-section 51(vi) of the Constitution was sufficient during the war for the Commonwealth to fix the maximum price for bread. In doing so the majority adopted a different method of interpretation from that adopted in dealing with the other heads of power in section 51, in that they treated the defence power as a purpose to which the legislation must be addressed while other powers require that the legislation is directed to the subject matter or answers the description of the head of power, and to disregard the purpose or object. Gavan Duffy & Rich JJ dissented in a joint judgement.

=== Necessity ===
The Court held that it was no answer to the War Precautions Act to say that a method was not necessary because the end might be attained by other means because the choice of means was a matter for parliament. Griffith CJ rejected the concept of necessity as overriding the Constitution and that the court may make inquiry into the facts, holding that the Court was concerned with the existence of the power and whether it was necessary or desirable was a matter for Parliament. Barton J similarly held that once it was determined that a law was authorised by the Constitution, whether it was wise and expedient was a political question for the Parliament, not a judicial question for the Courts. Higgins J in his separate judgement also held that it was enough that the Act was capable of aiding the defence of the Commonwealth and that whether it did so was not for the Court to decide.

Neither Isaacs J, with whom Powers J agreed, nor the dissenting judges, Gavan Duffy & Rich JJ, expressed any opinion on this issue.

=== Extent of the defence power ===
Griffith CJ disposed of the suggestion that the defence power was in some way limited holding "As to the suggested limitation by the context, the words "naval" and "military" are not words of limitation, but rather of extension, showing that the subject matter includes all kinds of warlike operations." Barton J argued from the perspective that the safety of Australia depended on the success of the British Empire in the war, holding that the defence of Australia was not limited to the operations of troops and warships, but extended to the use of every resource of the nation to injure the enemy or help Australia's allies. Barton J held that the Act and regulations were a valid exercise of the defence power in times or war, but not in time of peace.

Isaacs J also saw the war as a battle for the continued existence of Australia, holding that all other powers were necessarily dependent on the effective exercise of the defence power for the purpose of preserving Australia and the States at all hazards and by all available means. Higgins J the ambit of the defence power was "not merely to make laws for the control of the forces, but to make laws (not for, but) " with respect to " naval and military defence, and to matters incidental to that power". The nature of defence may require a national effort to preserve Australia's existence, requiring the whole force of the nation.

Gavan Duffy & Rich JJ disagreed that the extent of the defence power depended on whether there was a state of war or peace, holding that "he provisions of the Constitution must have a fixed and accurate meaning which cannot vary according to the pressure of circumstances." Their Honours saw the defence power as limited to dealing "with the raising, maintenance or use of any naval or military forces, or with the training or equipment of such forces, or with the supply of any naval or military material, or with any matter immediately ancillary to any of these things".

=== Reserved Powers ===
One of the challenges for Griffith CJ and Barton J was how to accommodate the doctrine of reserved powers. If the Commonwealth Parliament was unable to regulate the brewing industry, conditions for railway employees, manufacturers of agricultural machinery, or unfair competition by corporations, how could the Commonwealth's powers extend to directly fix a maximum price for bread?

Griffith CJ held that "The power to make laws with respect to defence is, of course, a paramount power, and if it comes into conflict with any reserved State rights the latter must give way." Barton J distinguished between powers in peace and war, holding that "If an activity belongs solely to a State in time of peace it does not follow that it is not a means of defence for Commonwealth hands in time of war."

Isaacs J doubted that it was permissible to give legal prominence to any one Commonwealth power, even one as necessary as defence, maintaining his previous rejection of the reserved powers doctrine, holding the limits of the defence power "are bounded only by the requirements of self-preservation. It is complete in itself, and there can be no implied reservation of any State power to abridge the express grant of a power to the Commonwealth". His Honour acknowledged that the Commonwealth was entering a legislative area normally outside of its powers, holding that

I do not hold that the Legislature is at liberty wantonly and with manifest caprice to enter upon the domain ordinarily reserved to the States. In a certain sense and to a certain extent the position is examinable by a Court. If there were no war, and no sign of war, the position would be entirely different. But when we see before us a mighty and unexampled struggle in which we as a people, as an indivisible people, are not spectators but actors, when we, as a judicial tribunal, can see beyond controversy that coordinated effort in every department of our life may be needed to ensure success and maintain our freedom, the Court has then reached the limit of its jurisdiction. If the measure questioned may conceivably in such circumstances even incidentally aid the effectuation of the power of defence, the Court must hold its hand and leave the rest to the judgment and wisdom and discretion of the Parliament and the Executive it controls-for they alone have the information, the knowledge and the experience and also, by the Constitution, the authority to judge of the situation and lead the nation to the desired end.

Higgins J similarly maintained his rejection of the reserved powers doctrine, holding that the constitutional question was limited to the interpretation of the express defence power and rejected the suggestion that the defence power was paramount, holding "All the subjects for legislation in sec. 51 are on the same logical level: there is no hierarchy in the powers, with the power as to defence on the top."

Gavan Duffy & Rich JJ in their dissent placed emphasis on the powers of the States, holding that

The enumerated powers entrusted by the States to the Commonwealth are stated in language adopted after prolonged and meticulous discussion. The powers distributed and reserved were intended to enable the individual States and the federation of States to move, each in its own orbit, in a complete and permanent harmony.

== Subsequent consideration ==
In Stenhouse v Coleman Dixon J explained the difference in approach to the defence power arising from Farey v Burvett as follows:

Some of the difficulties which have been felt in the application of [the defence power] seem to me to be due to the circumstance that, unlike most other powers conferred by s. 51 of the Constitution, it involves the notion of purpose or object. In most of the paragraphs of s. 51 the subject of the power is described either by reference to a class of legal, commercial, economic or social transaction or activity (as trade and commerce, banking, marriage), or by specifying some class of public service (as postal installations, lighthouses), or undertaking or operation (as railway construction with the consent of a State), or by naming a recognized category of legislation (as taxation, bankruptcy) In such cases it is usual, when the validity of legislation is in question, to consider whether the legislation operates upon or affects the subject matter, or in the last else answers the description, and to disregard purpose or object. ... But 'a law with respect to the defence of the Commonwealth' is an expression which seems rather to treat defence or war as the purpose to which the legislation must be addressed.

== See also ==
- Australian constitutional law
- List of High Court of Australia cases
