= Cyclical asymmetry =

Term in economics

Cyclical asymmetry is an economic term that describes any large imbalance in economic factors occurring for purely-cyclical reactions by a market or nation. That may include employment rates, debt retention, interest rates, bond strengths, or stock market imbalances.

== Types ==
There are two main types of cyclical asymmetry: fiscal and economic.

=== Fiscal cyclical asymmetry ===
Fiscal cyclical asymmetry is based on national or international changes to fiscal policy as a result of cyclical intervention in money markets or currency exchanges. A simple example is the reaction of the US Federal Reserve to raise interest rates when the dollar performs too well against other currencies such as the euro and the yen. Since currency exchanges are often predilated on the results of economic changes such as quarterly profit results, Federal Reserve must be cautious not to overreact or such fiscal changes will actually exacerbate the situation by making investment in America more attractive than equalizing exchange rates. When this does occur, it is a cyclical asymmetry.

=== Economic cyclical asymmetry ===
Economic cyclical asymmetry is usually based on cyclical trends in national markets, such as the labor market. A simple example is found in the yearly changes in demand for labor. Job markets are, by nature, cyclical, with upswings in certain sectors such as retail near year's end, and in construction during the spring and summer. While job creation and destruction as a national whole average usually equalize, when disturbances in the markets occur, the disruptions can cause higher than usual unemployment, which has a negative effect on the economy and causes further economic stress.

== Causes ==
The primary cause of cyclical asymmetry is rapid change in an otherwise regularly cyclical model, and overreactions to counteract such changes. Similar to a man walking across a swaying tightrope, any economic model subject to cyclical stressors must find a balance. When it does not, cyclical asymmetries occur.

== Effects ==
Cyclical asymmetry is a form of nonlinear economics and so its effects can be widely varied. However, the primary identification of a cyclical asymmetry is that resources, results, or actions taken to correct a change result in an unequal distribution of a resource or factor, which always leads to a disruption.

In economics, particularly with fiscal policy, poorly chosen compensating actions can result in multiple CAs, spiralling out of control into depression. The Great Depression could be construed as a result of cyclical asymmetry carried to ridiculous extremes, with most economic and fiscal policy bent to the ideal of mass speculation and investment over rational investment on assets.

== See also ==
- Normative economics
- Bifurcation theory
- Oligopsony
