= Section 82 of the Constitution of Australia =

Order of distribution of funds

Section 82 of the Constitution of Australia sets out the order of expenditure of government funds. It states funds must first be spent on costs associated with the collection of government funds (the ATO, Australian Treasury etc.), then to cover all government expenditure, before any distribution to the states under sections 89, 93 and 94.

== Text ==
The costs, charges, and expenses incident to the collection, management, and receipt of the Consolidated Revenue Fund shall form the first charge thereon; and the revenue of the Commonwealth shall in the first instance be applied to the payment of the expenditure of the Commonwealth.

— Section 82, Australian Constitution
