= Victoria v Commonwealth (1957) =

- Court: High Court of Australia
- Full case name: The State of Victoria & another v The Commonwealth; The State of NSW & another v The Commonwealth
- Decided: 23 August 1957
- Citations: [1957] HCA 54, (1957) 99 CLR 575

Court membership
- Judges sitting: Dixon CJ, McTiernan, Williams, Webb, Fullagar, Kitto and Taylor JJ

Case opinions
- (7:0) The State Grants Act 1942 was valid under the taxation power (4:3) Section 221 of the Income Tax and Social Services Contribution Assessment Act is not a valid exercise of the taxation power (per Dixon CJ, McTiernan, Kitto and Taylor JJ)

Laws applied
- This case overturned a previous ruling
- South Australia v Commonwealth (First Uniform Tax case)

Victoria v Commonwealth, ("the Second Uniform Tax case") is a High Court of Australia case that affirmed the Commonwealth government's ability to impose a scheme of uniform income tax, adding to Australia's vertical fiscal imbalance in the spending requirements and taxing abilities of the various levels of government.

== Overview ==
The Uniform Tax system was implemented in 1942 and relied upon 4 pieces of legislation, all held to be constitutionally valid in the First Uniform Tax case. Some of the laws were justified under the defence power, but the scheme was not dismantled after the end of wartime conflict.

It was held that the Income Tax Act 1942, could not be challenged because it was within the Commonwealth's taxation power. The Income Tax (Wartime Arrangements) Act 1942, was not an issue because it had already been repealed.

In the first Uniform Tax case the High Court decided that the Commonwealth Parliament had the power to tax incomes. The Commonwealth had passed legislation that allowed them to nationally tax incomes. Prior to this each state had their own income tax laws. The new Commonwealth taxation was so high that people could not effectively pay both taxes. The states challenged this in the High Court and argued that; Taxation was a concurrent power; the Commonwealth tax was so high that people would not be able to pay both taxes and therefore the states would no longer be able to tax incomes. The High Court disagreed and held that section 109 ensured that Commonwealth law overrode inconsistent state laws on concurrent powers, the Commonwealth could impose income Taxation.

== Decision ==
The High Court affirmed the position of the First Uniform Tax case, with some exceptions.

The States Grants Act 1942, was held to be valid, despite a section 96 issue. The Commonwealth can use the section 96 grants power to induce a state to exercise its own powers as well as abstain from using its powers. Hence the Commonwealth can do such things to encourage or discourage a state from exercising its powers. However, while it can induce such things, it cannot coerce a state into accepting a grant. Nonetheless, indirect compulsion is constitutional. While the Income Tax Act 1942 raised Commonwealth income tax rates to a level that made it politically impossible for the states to impose their own, this was not at the level of coercion that was prohibited.

The decision in the First Uniform Tax case was overruled in relation to section 221 of the Income Assessment Act 1942. Section 221 required taxpayers to meet their Commonwealth tax liabilities before state tax liabilities and this section was held to be invalid. The majority (Dixon CJ, McTiernan, Kitto and Taylor JJ) thought that it was not pursuant to the taxation power. Dixon CJ held that it could only possibly be a valid exercise of the implied incidental taxation power. However, the scope of section 51(ii) is federal taxation for federal purposes. Hence any taxation law made pursuant to the incidental power must also be federal taxation for federal purposes. Dixon CJ saw the purpose of the legislation as the exclusion of the state's ability to impose income tax, which is not a federal purpose. Although this section was challenged and overturned, it was not important because in a practical sense the states could no longer impose income taxes.

The Commonwealth cannot restrain states in terms of their governmental functions. Dixon CJ inferred from this principles that there should be some restraints on interpretation of section 96 of the constitution. Section 96 grants must be confined to grants of money, and is not a power to make laws with respect to general subject matter. It must be concerned with state finance and must not be coercive. The power to attach conditions to section 96 grants is broad but they must be within the state's constitutional competence to fulfil.

== See also ==
- Constitutional basis of taxation in Australia
- Australian constitutional law
