= Air Caledonie International v Commonwealth =

Judgement of the High Court of Australia

- Court: High Court of Australia
- Full case name: Air Caledonie International v The Commonwealth
- Decided: 24 November 1988
- Citations: [1988] HCA 61, (1988) 165 CLR 462

Case history
- Prior action: none
- Subsequent action: none

Court membership
- Judges sitting: Mason CJ, Wilson, Brennan, Deane, Dawson, Toohey and Gaudron JJ

Case opinions
- (7:0) The Migration Amendment Act 1987 was invalid (per Mason CJ, Wilson, Brennan, Deane, Dawson, Toohey and Gaudron JJ)

Air Caledonie International v Commonwealth, is a High Court of Australia case that provides guidance as to the constitutional definition of a tax.

== Facts ==
The Commonwealth passed an amendment modifying the Migration Act 1958. The amendment imposed a fee on all persons entering Australia for immigration clearance. The implementation of such a scheme meant that airline operators would have to make payments to the Commonwealth government.

== Decision ==
The High Court unanimously held that the fee for migration clearance was a tax. If section 55 of the Australian Constitution (which requires that legislation imposing tax deals only with imposing tax) is read literally, the effect of this decision would have invalidated the rest of the Migration Act. The Court was thus careful to invalidate only the Amending Act. The migration clearance fee was a tax because it has all the positive attributes of a tax. It was:

- compulsory;
- exacted by a public authority for public purposes enforceable by law;
- not a fee for services.

The court also provided some guidance as to the characteristics of a tax:

- a fee could be considered a tax even if it was collected by a private entity not properly described as public
- the liability must be imposed in relation to some ascertainable criteria

The court also made a distinction between citizens and non-citizens. An Australian citizen cannot be stopped from entering Australia, so although they paid the clearance fee, no service was being rendered to them. Hence the fee paid could not have been a fee for a service.

== See also ==
- Constitutional basis of taxation in Australia
- Australian constitutional law
