= Pape v Federal Commissioner of Taxation =

Judgment of the High Court of Australia

- Court: High Court of Australia
- Full case name: Pape and The Commissioner of Taxation of the Commonwealth of Australia & The Commonwealth of Australia
- Decided: 3 April 2009 decision announced; 7 July 2009 reasons published
- Citations: [2009] HCA 23, (2009) 238 CLR 1
- Transcripts: 13 Mar [2009] HCATrans 54 (application for referral of special case); 30 Mar [2009] HCATrans 59; 31 Mar [2009] HCATrans 60; 1 Apr [2009] HCATrans 61

Court membership
- Judges sitting: French CJ, Gummow, Hayne, Heydon, Crennan, Kiefel and Bell JJ

Case opinions
- the plaintiff has standing; the "Bonus Act" is a valid law of the Commonwealth; there is a valid appropriation within the meaning of the Constitution; per agreement of the parties, no order for costs

Pape v Federal Commissioner of Taxation is an Australian court case concerning the constitutional validity of the Tax Bonus for Working Australians Act (No 2) 2009 (Cth) which sought to give one-off payments of up to $900 to Australian taxpayers. The decision of the High Court of Australia was announced on 3 April 2009, with its full reasons released on 7 July 2009.

The plaintiff in the case, Bryan Pape, was a law lecturer and barrister who represented himself before the Court. He challenged the legislation on the ground that the payments, said to be a tax bonus, were actually a gift and were not supported by the taxation power in the Constitution. The Commonwealth argued that the legislation was supported by all or any combination of the appropriations power under s 81 of the Constitution, the taxation power (s 51(ii)), the external affairs power (s 51(xxix)), the trade or commerce power (s 51(i)) and the implied nationhood power.

The Court concluded, by a 4:3 majority, that the Act was a valid law of the Commonwealth supported by a head of legislative power under the Constitution.

== Background ==
=== The economic stimulus package ===
On 18 February 2009, the Parliament of Australia passed two Acts: the Tax Bonus for Working Australians Act (No 2) 2009 (Cth) and the Tax Bonus for Working Australians (Consequential Amendments) Act (No 2) 2009 (Cth). The two Acts formed part of the Rudd Government's economic stimulus package in response to the 2008 financial crisis. The principal operation of the Acts was to pay tax bonuses of between $250 and $900 to Australians whose taxable incomes were no more than $100,000 in the 2007–08 financial year. The Acts required the Australian Taxation Office (ATO) to pay the tax bonuses as soon as practicable after the Acts commenced.

=== The plaintiff ===
Bryan Reginald Pape was a lecturer in law at the University of New England and a former officer of the conservative National Party of Australia.

The Acts entitled the payment of a tax bonus of $250 to Pape. On 26 February 2009, Pape issued a writ in the High Court for declarations that the tax bonus Acts were unconstitutional, and that the payments of the tax bonus were unlawful.

=== Litigation ===
The respondents to the writ were the Commonwealth of Australia and the Commissioner of Taxation. The Attorneys-General for New South Wales, South Australia and Western Australia intervened. Pape represented himself.

At a hearing on 13 March 2009 before Justice Gummow, a special case was stated for the Full Court. Hearings were held from 30 March to 1 April.

To enable the ATO to pay the tax bonus to Australians, the High Court delivered its decision and orders at 10:15 am on 3 April 2009, just two days after the hearing. The High Court did not issue reasons until 7 July 2009.

The parties agreed to submit four questions to the High Court for determination, by way of a special case:

1. Did Pape have standing to seek the relief claimed in his Writ of Summons and his Statement of Claim?

2. Was the tax bonus Act valid because it was supported by one or more expressed or implied heads of legislative power under the Constitution?

3. Would payment of the tax bonus to which Pape was entitled be supported by a valid appropriation under sections 81 and 83 of the Constitution?

4. Who should pay the costs of the special case?

== Reasons ==
=== Standing ===
A preliminary issue in the case concerned whether Pape had standing to seek the relief he claimed. The Commonwealth conceded that Pape had standing to contend that the payment to him under the Bonus Act was unlawful, but submitted that Pape did not have sufficient special interest to argue the broader issue that the Bonus Act was invalid in its application to other persons. No member of the Court accepted this submission. A finding by the Court that the payment of the bonus to Mr Pape was unlawful because the Bonus Act was invalid would be binding in any subsequent disputes concerning the validity of the Bonus Act. Accordingly, if the tax bonus was invalid in respect of Pape, the entire $7.7 billion tax bonus package would be invalid. This was decided on based on the operation of the doctrine of precedent and the fact that as the Act was an "inseverable whole", Pape would have standing to challenge all provisions of the Act in his complaint.

Pape's standing as a plaintiff was novel in that his financial interests (to a $250 tax bonus) would be adversely affected if he succeeded in the case.

The answer to Question 1 of the special case was therefore "yes".

=== Constitutionality ===
==== "Appropriation power" ====
Section 81 of the Constitution provides,

All revenues or moneys raised or received by the Executive Government of the Commonwealth shall form one Consolidated Revenue Fund, to be appropriated for the purposes of the Commonwealth in the manner and subject to the charges and liabilities imposed by this Constitution.

Section 83 relevantly provides,

No money shall be drawn from the Treasury of the Commonwealth except under appropriation made by law.

The Commonwealth argued that section 81 is a grant of legislative power to the Commonwealth to make laws to appropriate money. The Commonwealth also argued that the requirement that an appropriation be "for the purposes of the Commonwealth" meant the purposes determined by the Parliament; in other words, that the Parliament's power to make laws appropriating money was unlimited.

The Court unanimously rejected the contention of the Commonwealth that section 81 of the Constitution provided a power for the Commonwealth to appropriate and spend money. French CJ, after surveying the history of section 81 and previous High Court judgments held,

"In my opinion, the history, the text and the logic underlying the operation of ss 81 and 83 are inconsistent with their characterisation as the source of a "spending" or "appropriations" power, notwithstanding their description as such in some of the judgments of Justices of this Court"

The Court held that the expenditure of money by the Commonwealth was required to be undertaken either (a) by legislation under the Commonwealth's legislative powers; or (b) under the Commonwealth's executive powers. Sections 81 and 83 cannot, on their own, support the spending of money by the Commonwealth.

==== Executive power ====
The Court, by majority (4:3; Hayne, Heydon and Kiefel JJ dissenting), held that the Bonus Act was a valid law of the Commonwealth Parliament, supported by s 51(xxxix) of the Constitution as being incidental to the exercise by the Commonwealth Government of its executive power under s 61 of the Constitution.

The answer to Question 2 of the special case was therefore "yes".

==== Taxation power ====
A majority of the Court, in obiter dicta (4:2; Hayne and Kiefel JJ dissenting in part, French CJ not considering the question), concluded that the Bonus Act could not be supported by the taxation power.

=== Existence of appropriation ===
Mr Pape argued that the money that was to be paid to taxpayers under the Bonus Act had not been appropriated from the Consolidated Revenue Fund by law, as required by s 83 of the Constitution. He also argued that even if there had been an appropriation by law, it was not an appropriation "for the purposes of the Commonwealth". Section 81 of the Constitution states: "All revenues or moneys raised or received by the Executive Government of the Commonwealth shall form one Consolidated Revenue Fund, to be appropriated for the purposes of the Commonwealth in the manner and subject to the charges and liabilities imposed by this Constitution."

The Court held 4:3 that there was an appropriation by law. Section 16 of the Taxation Administration Act 1953 (Cth) appropriated the Consolidated Revenue Fund for the payment of certain amounts the Commissioner is required to pay under any "taxation law". Section 3 of the Bonus Act had the effect of making the Bonus Act a "taxation law". The Bonus Act increased the amount of money to be withdrawn from the Consolidated Revenue Fund under an existing appropriation. That was sufficient to meet the requirement of s 83.

The Court held that sections 81 and 83 do not themselves authorise any expenditure; rather they require that the spending of government funds be authorised by Parliament. The answer to Question 3 of the special case was, therefore, yes.

=== Costs ===
There was no order for costs. During the hearing of the matter, the parties agreed that, whatever the outcome of the case, each party would bear its own costs.

== Significance ==
Aside from the High Court's pronouncements on the scope of the Constitutional provisions in question, commentators have pointed out that the "immediate practical question raised by the decision, is the implications that it has for Commonwealth spending programs, whether or not supported by legislation". Professor George Williams stated Commonwealth may well find now that it's made what could amount to billions of dollars in illegal payments" and that it is "one of those very rare High Court decisions you get that's going to change the way government operates".

== See also ==
- List of High Court of Australia cases
- Williams v Commonwealth [2012] HCA 23, (2012) 248 CLR 156
