= Commonwealth Offices Building, Melbourne =

Commonwealth Offices Building
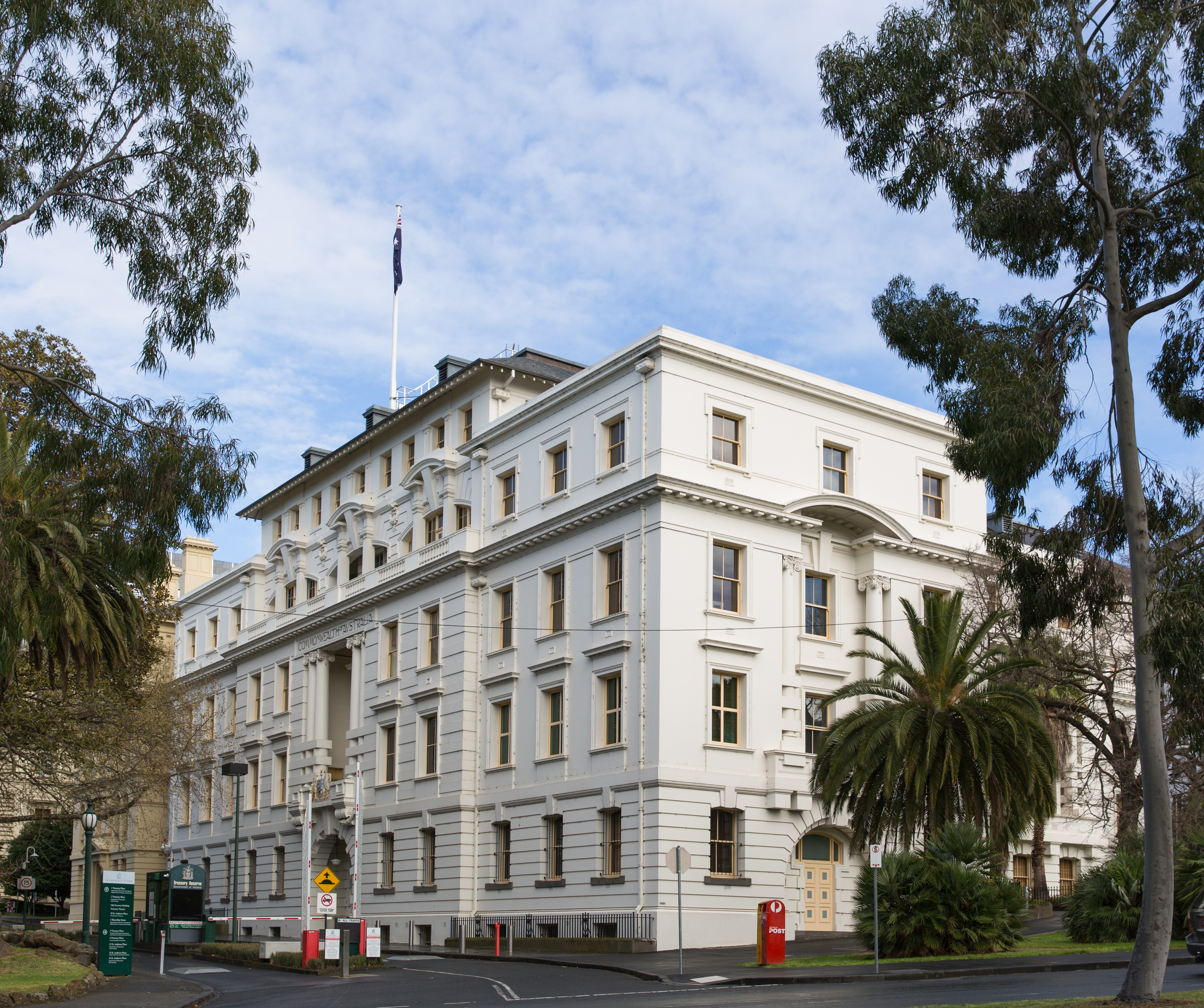

- Location within Melbourne
- 37.8124°S 144.9772°E
- Location: 4 Treasury Place, East Melbourne, Victoria, Australia

Commonwealth Heritage List
- Official name: Commonwealth Offices Building
- Type: Listed place (Historic)
- Designated: 22 June 2004
- Reference no.: 105453

Commonwealth Offices Building is a heritage-listed government building at 4 Treasury Place, East Melbourne, Victoria, Australia. It was designed by John Smith Murdoch, the first Commonwealth Government Architect and built from 1911 to 1912. It was added to the Australian Commonwealth Heritage List on 22 June 2004.

== History ==
The Commonwealth Offices building at 4 Treasury Place was built some ten years after Federation and concurrently with the choice of Canberra as the National Capital. It was the first office building constructed by the Commonwealth and reflects the fact that Melbourne was the seat of the Commonwealth Government until the opening of Old Parliament House in Canberra in 1927. After 1927 the offices were retained in Commonwealth ownership and use: indeed many departments remained in Melbourne for decades. Melbourne was the Federal Capital from 1901 to 1927. The Commonwealth Parliament sat in the Victorian Parliament House and the Governor General occupied the Victorian Government House.

The new Federal Public Service grew mainly out of transferred Victorian departments, it was housed in rented accommodation initially and when new Commonwealth Offices were needed they were erected in 1911-1912 within the precinct of Victorian State Offices in Treasury Place. In 1910, after the fusion of the conservative groupings in the Commonwealth Parliament, the Labor Party under Andrew Fisher was elected to power. Fisher appointed the colourful King O'Malley as the Minister for Home Affairs. It was O'Malley who was to preside over the early planning of Canberra and over the building of the first Commonwealth Offices in Melbourne. On 19 October 1910 an agreement was signed by the Premier of Victoria and the Minister of Home Affairs agreeing to the acquisition of the land in Treasury Place subject to the ratification of the Victorian Parliament. The State agreed to the purchase by the Commonwealth at a price of 7,000 pounds and the acquisition was Gazetted on 21 January 1911.

Victoria, at the suggestion of the Commonwealth, designed a building for the 4 Treasury Place site conforming to the design of the existing Victorian Department of Agriculture building (which also temporarily housed the Federal Treasury) which it was to adjoin. The design was of four storeys with a raised middle portion which gave a fifth storey. After considering the proposals O'Malley considered that the Commonwealth could erect a building more cheaply and quickly than the State and he committed the Commonwealth to the construction of the new offices through the employment of direct labour. The decision to place the design in the hands of the Commonwealth was of symbolic significance as it was a break from the general practice up to that time of having works designed for the Commonwealth in State offices. The progress of the building was keenly watched both by O'Malley's political opponents and by Melbourne building contractors, who opposed the use of direct labour.

In November 1910 plans prepared by the Commonwealth Department of Home Affairs were approved for a new Commonwealth Office building containing offices and a new Federal Treasury to be erected adjacent to the present building occupied by the Federal Treasury. The new building took the same form as that proposed by the State but was more ornamental. The basement was planned to include Strong Rooms for the use of the Note Issue Branch of the Treasury. Construction began in April 1911. The incidence of wet weather at the site resulted in political and labour relations controversy when O'Malley agreed to the payment of wet weather time for the workers. The floors and structure of the building were constructed in reinforced concrete for purposes of fire protection, made necessary by the existence of the Strong Room, which stored gold reserve and bank notes in the basement. The building was completed in August 1912 and occupied by the Prime Minister's Office, the Attorney General, the Treasurer's Department and the Post Master General. In a recessed corner of the building bluestone steps lead to the Prime Minister's residential entrance under a refined pediment portico. A round tower with convex glazed windows emphasises the site boundaries on the elevation to St. Andrew's Place.

== Description ==
Commonwealth Offices Building is at 4 Treasury Place, corner Lansdowne Street and St Andrews Place, East Melbourne.

The Commonwealth Offices is part of a precinct of a fine group of public buildings which date from 1858 and the design of 4 Treasury Place both respects the scale and rhythm of the existing buildings and draws on elements of the style of its distinguished neighbours in the Parliament/East Melbourne Conservation Area. The interior is gracious yet austere. Decorative detail has concentrated in the more public areas of the entry, staircase and foyers of the floors. Three aspects of particular note are as follows. The use of three colours of Bruthen district marble in the ground floor entry level is a striking accent which complements the overall simplicity of the building's interior. The timber joinery, in the entry area and the foyers on the other floors, is significant for its contrast in level of detail to the remainder of the joinery. The cantilevered concrete curved staircase which provides access in the South Block is an outstanding feature which dominates the entry and foyers. Internally, the column and beams are exposed and walls are recessed from the face of these features in order to express them more clearly. This subtle feature is distinctive of Murdoch's work.

The building's integrity is high and alterations over the years have not had a major impact. The building is in sound condition. Currently the building is subject to a review of its future use and to refurbishment. (1997)

== Heritage listing ==
The Commonwealth Offices building is associated with the foundation of the Commonwealth of Australia and with Melbourne as the Seat of the Federal Government until 1927. It was the first office building constructed by the Commonwealth and has been used as the Melbourne offices of the Prime Minister and Cabinet and the Governor General since 1912. The Offices are also associated with the application of Labor principles by Home Affairs Minister King O'Malley through the establishment of paid wet weather time for workers on the site.

The Commonwealth Offices is an example of a Commonwealth building designed in the Edwardian Baroque style, as seen in features such as the exaggerated keystones, occuli, cartouche, heavy cornicing and giant arches. The Offices are distinctive internally for the use of three colours of marble from the Bruthen district of Gippsland, contrasting joinery and cantilevered concrete curved staircase.

The offices are associated with and represent a major work of significant Commonwealth architect John Smith Murdoch. The Commonwealth building complements other notable buildings in this important Melbourne precinct and is a significant element in the streetscape.
