= Section 99 of the Constitution of Australia =

Govern actions of the Commonwealth and the various States

Section 99 of the Constitution of Australia, is one of several important non-discrimination provisions that govern actions of the Commonwealth and (in some cases) the various States. (Note: The other provisions are s. 51(ii) (which forbids the use of taxation to discriminate between States or parts of States), s. 51(iii) (uniform bounties on the production or export of goods), s. 88 (uniform imposition of customs duties), s. 102 (where Commonwealth laws can forbid State discrimination in the matter of railways) and s. 117 (equal treatment of State residents by other States) S. 92 and s. 51(xxvi) also have important non-discrimination aspects.)

== Full text ==
The Commonwealth shall not, by any law or regulation of trade, commerce, or revenue, give preference to one State or any part thereof over another State or any part thereof.

== Jurisprudence ==
The section was first tested in 1906 in The Colonial Sugar Refining Company Limited v Irving, where the Commonwealth had introduced an exemption in its excise duty legislation for goods on which customs or excise duty had been paid under State legislation before the imposition of Commonwealth duties. At the Judicial Committee of the Privy Council, Lord Davey, ruling that the exemption was constitutional, stated that "The rule laid down ... is a general one, applicable to all the States alike, and the fact that it operates unequally in the several States arises not from anything done by the Parliament, but from the inequality of the duties imposed by the States themselves." This principle has not been in doubt in subsequent jurisprudence.

The High Court of Australia first considered the provision in R v Barger, which held the Excise Tariff 1906 invalid on several grounds. The aspect which offended s. 99 concerned an exemption relating to goods manufactured by any person in any part of the Commonwealth under certain conditions relating to the remuneration of labour, which could vary according to local circumstances, agreements and judicial opinion. In invalidating this provision, Griffith CJ, Barton and O'Connor JJ said:

The words "States or parts of States" must be read as synonymous with "parts of the Commonwealth" or "different localities within the Commonwealth." The existing limits of the States are arbitrary, and it would be a strange thing if the Commonwealth Parliament could discriminate in a taxing Act between one locality and another, merely because such localities were not coterminous with States or with parts of the same State.

In his dissent in Barger, Isaacs J disputed the inclusion of "different localities within the Commonwealth," and subsequent judgments of the High Court and the Privy Council split on this point. In Elliott v Commonwealth, Evatt J, in his dissenting judgment, rejecting Isaacs, stated:

in relation to sec. 99, the following propositions should be accepted:—

1. Sec. 99 forbids four types of preferential legislation, viz., (a) giving preference to a State over another State; (b) giving preference to a State over any part of another State; (c) giving preference to any part of a State over another State; (d) giving preference to any part of a State over any part of another State.
2. Sec. 99 forbids laws or regulations which accord preferential treatment to persons or things as a consequence of local situation in any part of the six States, regardless of all other circumstances.
3. The section is not infringed if the preferential treatment is a consequence of a number of circumstances, including the circumstance of locality.
4. The section operates objectively in the sense that the purpose or motive of the Legislature or Executive in giving preference by a law of commerce or revenue is not a relevant question, e.g., it is irrelevant that the Legislature or Executive desires to facilitate or encourage inter-State or overseas trade, or to increase revenue.
5. Sec. 99 may apply although the legislation or regulations contain no mention of a State eo nomine, e.g., the section may be infringed if preference is given to part of a State (e.g., that part of New South Wales which is represented by the port of Sydney) over another State (e.g., Western Australia) or any part of another State.
6. To prove infringement of sec. 99 it is not sufficient to show discrimination based on mere locality; it must also be shown that, as a consequence of the discrimination, tangible benefits, advantages, facilities or immunities are given to persons or corporations.

Evatt J's summary was endorsed by the High Court in 2004 in Permanent Trustee Australia Ltd v Commissioner of State Revenue, which is the foundation of current jurisprudence concerning the provision. Its rationale was further summarised in 2013 where, in Fortescue Metals Group Limited v Commonwealth, the Court declared that its objectives were similar to that with respect to the taxation power:

49. ... the constraints imposed by ss. 51(ii) and 99 of the Constitution serve a federal purpose – the economic unity of the Commonwealth and the formal equality in the Federation of the States inter se and their people. Those high purposes are not defeated by uniform Commonwealth laws with respect to taxation or laws of trade, commerce or revenue which have different effects between one State and another because of their application to different circumstances or their interactions with different State legal regimes. Nor are those purposes defeated merely because a Commonwealth law includes provisions of general application allowing for different outcomes according to the existence or operation of a particular class of State law. A criterion for determining whether that category of Commonwealth law discriminates or gives a preference in the sense used in ss. 51(ii) and 99 is whether the distinctions it makes are appropriate and adapted to a proper objective.

== Significant cases ==
- The Colonial Sugar Refining Company Limited v Irving;
- R v Barger;
- Cameron v Deputy Federal Commissioner of Taxation for Tasmania;
- James v Commonwealth (1928);
- Crowe v Commonwealth;
- Elliott v Commonwealth;
- W R Moran Pty Ltd v Deputy Federal Commissioner of Taxation;
- Morgan v Commonwealth;
- Federal Commissioner of Taxation v Clyne;
- Permanent Trustee Australia Ltd v Commissioner of State Revenue;
- Fortescue Metals Group Limited v Commonwealth;
- Queensland Nickel Pty Limited v Commonwealth of Australia;
