= Fiscal imbalance =

Fiscal imbalance is a mismatch in the revenue powers and expenditure responsibilities of a government.

== Fiscal imbalances as differences in net fiscal benefits ==
A fiscal imbalance emerges when sub-national governments have different abilities to raise funds from their tax bases and to provide services. This creates differences in ‘net fiscal benefits’, which are a combination of levels of taxation and public services. It is these NFBs which are the main cause of horizontal fiscal disparities that in turn generate the need for equalization grants. Prominent among the objectives commonly attributed to intergovernmental fiscal transfers is ‘equalization’ of fiscal capacities or resolution of fiscal imbalances.

Thus, the transfer system can promote efficiency in the public sector and can level the field for intergovernmental competition. The discussion of fiscal imbalance and equalisation was of particular importance in the drafting of the new Iraqi constitution. It was a sticking point for the drafting process—with the oil rich regions seeking to minimise the reallocation of revenue while other regions sought to maximise equalisation payments.

== See also ==
- Fiscal federalism
- Equalization payments
- Cyclical asymmetry

Nations:

- Fiscal imbalance in Australia
- Fiscal imbalance in Canada
- Fiscal imbalance in Nigeria
