= Section 51(vi) of the Constitution of Australia =

Enabling defence-related legislation

Section 51(vi) of the Australian Constitution, commonly called the defence power, is a subsection of Section 51 of the Australian Constitution that gives the Commonwealth Parliament the right to legislate with respect to the defence of Australia and the control of the defence forces. The High Court has adopted a different approach to the interpretation of the defence power, which emphasises the purpose of the legislation, primarily the defence of Australia, rather than the subject matter.

== Section 51(vi) and the Australian States ==
The defence power is set out in section 51 of the Constitution as follows:

51 The Parliament shall, subject to this Constitution, have power to make laws for the peace, order, and good government of the Commonwealth with respect to:

(vi) the naval and military defence of the Commonwealth and of the several States, and the control of the forces to execute and maintain the laws of the Commonwealth;
(xxxii) the control of railways with respect to transport for the naval and military purposes of the Commonwealth;

Generally the Commonwealth powers in section 51 can also be legislated on by the states, although Commonwealth law will prevail in cases of inconsistency. However, the defence power must be read in conjunction with other parts of the Australian Constitution — namely,

114. A State shall not, without the consent of the Parliament of the Commonwealth, raise or maintain any naval or military force, or impose any tax on property of any kind belonging to the Commonwealth, nor shall the Commonwealth impose any tax on property of any kind belonging to a State.

and

119. The Commonwealth shall protect every State against invasion and, on the application of the Executive Government of the State, against domestic violence.

This effectively makes the defence power exclusive to the Commonwealth.

== Breadth of Section 51(vi) ==
The defence power allows the Commonwealth to raise an army and navy. Although air forces did not exist in 1901, "military defence" has been considered broad enough to include an air force. What other laws the defence power will support has been held by the High Court of Australia to vary based on external circumstances.

During the two World Wars, the power was held to apply very broadly, even to domestic issues. In October 1914 the Australian Parliament enacted the War Precautions Act 1914, which gave the Governor-General a broad power to "make regulations for securing the public safety and the defence of the Commonwealth". These powers were retrospectively amended in 1916 to specifically include price controls. A determination was published in the Gazette fixing the maximum price for 4 pounds of bread to be sold in Melbourne at 6 1/2 pence. The High Court considered the validity of this legislation in Farey v Burvett, with the majority, Griffith CJ, Barton, Isaacs, Higgins & Powers JJ, holding that the defence powers in sub-section 51(vi) of the Constitution was sufficient during the war for the Commonwealth to fix the maximum price for bread.

In doing so the majority adopted a different method of interpretation from that adopted in dealing with the other heads of power in section 51, in that they treated the defence power as a purpose to which the legislation must be addressed while other powers require that the legislation is directed to the subject matter or answers the description of the head of power, and to disregard the purpose or object. As Isaacs J. (as he then was) observed in Farey v Burvett:

I do not hold that the Legislature is at liberty wantonly and with manifest caprice to enter upon the domain ordinarily reserved to the States. In a certain sense and to a certain extent the position is examinable by a Court. If there were no war, and no sign of war, the position would be entirely different. But when we see before us a mighty and unexampled struggle in which we as a people, as an indivisible people, are not spectators but actors, when we, as a judicial tribunal, can see beyond controversy that co-ordinated effort in every department of our life may be needed to ensure success and maintain our freedom, the Court has then reached the limit of its jurisdiction. If the measure questioned may conceivably in such circumstances even incidentally aid the effectuation of the power of defence, the Court must hold its hand and leave the rest to the judgment and wisdom and discretion of the Parliament and the Executive it controls—for they alone have the information, the knowledge and the experience and also, by the Constitution, the authority to judge of the situation and lead the nation to the desired end.

In Stenhouse v Coleman, Dixon J explained the difference in approach to the defence power as follows:

Some of the difficulties which have been felt in the application of [the defence power] seem to me to be due to the circumstance that, unlike most other powers conferred by s. 51 of the Constitution, it involves the notion of purpose or object. In most of the paragraphs of s. 51 the subject of the power is described either by reference to a class of legal, commercial, economic or social transaction or activity (as trade and commerce, banking, marriage), or by specifying some class of public service (as postal installations, lighthouses), or undertaking or operation (as railway construction with the consent of a State), or by naming a recognized category of legislation (as taxation, bankruptcy) In such cases it is usual, when the validity of legislation is in question, to consider whether the legislation operates upon or affects the subject matter, or in the last else answers the description, and to disregard purpose or object. ... But 'a law with respect to the defence of the Commonwealth' is an expression which seems rather to treat defence or war as the purpose to which the legislation must be addressed.

Accordingly, the defence power has been held to include:

- the preparation for war and against war, whether internal or external, and whether actually performed or only apprehended;
- the punishment, and prevention, of injurious activities, including espionage and fifth column work;
- the creation of measures for combatting terrorism
- being used to compel the transfer of civil servants and facilities involved in the collection of income taxes from the States to the Commonwealth
- taking possession of and controlling property, confiscating literature, and prohibiting public meetings of organizations whose activities are prejudicial to the defence of the Commonwealth or the prosecution of the war.

However:

- organizations cannot be deemed to be unlawful under an Act, and
- such organizations cannot themselves be dissolved as a result.

There have been attempts to employ a broad interpretation to the defence power. In 1949 the Commonwealth used it to support the introduction of the Snowy Mountains Hydroelectricity Scheme, as, although wartime hostilities had ceased, a secure electricity source was needed should Australia be attacked. The constitutionality of this was never tested, and the point became moot ten years later in 1959, when corresponding State legislation was passed to support it.

To determine whether a law is authorised under Section 51(vi) is a test of proportionality; whether the High Court interprets the law to be adapted and reasonably appropriate for the achievement of a defence purpose.

== The control of defence forces ==
The second aspect of the defence power is the control of the defence forces. The extent of this aspect has been considered by the High Court in the following cases:

- Private R v Cowan (2020) 283 ALR 1
- Re Tracey; Ex parte Ryan (1989): the defence power enabled the Parliament to enact a scheme of military discipline, including rules for the trial and punishment of offences, lying outside Chapter III;
- Re Nolan; Ex Parte Young (1991): a law to punish defence members and defence civilians for their conduct was a valid exercise of the defence power;
- Re Tyler; Ex parte Foley (1994): if the Constitution required a service tribunal exercising disciplinary powers to be independent, a general court martial constituted under the Defence Force Discipline Act met those requirements;
- Re Aird; Ex parte Alpert (2004): the Defence Force Discipline Act, which permitted a trial by general court martial, was a valid exercise of the defence power;
- White v Director of Military Prosecutions (2007): the administration of military justice under the Discipline Act was not an exercise of the judicial power of the Commonwealth;
- Lane v Morrison (2009): the Australian Military Court was an invalid attempt to exercise the judicial power of the Commonwealth because its members did not enjoy the tenure required by s 72 of the Constitution;
- Haskins v The Commonwealth (2011): the Military Justice (Interim Measures) Act was a valid exercise of the defence power and provided lawful authority justifying the detention of the plaintiff.

== See also ==
- Section 119 of the Constitution of Australia
