= Australian Government =

Federal executive government of Australia

Commonwealth Government
- Federal government

Overview
- Established: 1 January 1901; 125 years ago
- Country: Australia
- Leader: Prime Minister (Anthony Albanese)
- Appointed by: Governor-General (Sam Mostyn) on the advice of the prime minister
- Main organ: Cabinet
- Ministries: 16 ministerial departments
- Responsible to: House of Representatives/Commonwealth Parliament (Note: The precise responsibility of the government to House versus the Parliament as a whole is disputed. See 1975 Australian Constitutional Crisis.)
- Annual budget: ▲$833.3 billion (2026–27)
- Headquarters: Executive Wing, Parliament House, Canberra
- Website: Government Directory

The Australian Government, also known as the Commonwealth Government or simply as the federal government, is the national executive government of Australia, a federal parliamentary constitutional monarchy. The executive consists of the prime minister, cabinet ministers and other ministers of state who command the support of a majority of the members of the House of Representatives (the lower house) and also includes the departments and other executive bodies that ministers oversee. The current executive government consists of Anthony Albanese and other ministers of the Australian Labor Party (ALP), in office since the 2022 federal election. (Note: Colloquially, all members of the parliamentary party that support the current government are described as members of the government, however only ministers formally belong to the executive government.)

The prime minister is the head of the federal government and is a role which exists by constitutional convention, rather than by law. They are appointed to the role by the governor-general (the federal representative of the monarch of Australia). The governor-general normally appoints the parliamentary leader who commands the confidence of a majority of the members of the House of Representatives. Also by convention, the prime minister is a member of the lower house.

The prime minister and their sworn ministers form the cabinet, the key decision-making organ of the government that makes policy and decides the agenda of the government. Members of the government can exercise both legislative power (through their control of the parliament) and executive power (as ministers on behalf of the governor-general and the monarch). However, in accordance with responsible government, and to ensure accountability, actions of the government in its executive capacity are subject to scrutiny from parliament.

The Australian Government is headquartered in the executive wing of Parliament House, located in the nation's capital, Canberra, in the Australian Capital Territory. The head offices of all the federal departments are also located in Canberra.

== Name ==
The name of the government in the Constitution of Australia is the "Government of the Commonwealth". This was the name used in many early federal government publications.

However, in 1965 Robert Menzies indicated his preference for the name "Australian Government" in order to prevent confusion with the new Commonwealth of Nations. The Whitlam government legislated the use of "Government of Australia" in 1973 in line with its policy of promoting national goals and aspirations. (Note: Whitlam had previously argued in Parliament that the term Commonwealth "is thought to indicate that we are still dependent on Britain" and that the use of a variety of terms including "National", "Federal", "Commonwealth" and "Australian" was irrational and confusing. Later Country Party Senator Drake-Brockman accused the Whitlam Government of favouring the term Australian due to the government's wish for a unitary, rather than federal, political structure. However, government Senator Lionel Murphy stated that the change occurred due to a "loss of identity of Australia" following the emergence of the Commonwealth of Nations and that the new name "is paralleling the feelings of nationalism which are arising in Australia".) However, academic Anne Twomey argues that the government was also motivated by a desire to blur the differences between the Commonwealth and the states in an attempt to increase federal power. The Parliament of Australia website also notes that the name "Australian Government" is preferable in order to avoid confusion with the Commonwealth of Nations and the US federal government by those not familiar with Australia's system of government. This terminology remains preferred by the government. However, the terms Commonwealth Government and federal government are also common.

In some contexts, the term "government" refers to all public agencies that exercise the power of the State, whether legislative, executive or judicial.

== Executive power ==
The government's primary role, in its executive capacity, is to implement the laws passed by the parliament. However, laws are frequently drafted according to the interests of the executive branch as the government often also controls the legislative branch.

Unlike the other two branches of government, however, membership of the executive is not clearly defined. One definition describes the executive as a pyramid, consisting of three layers. At the top stands the king, as the symbolic apex and formal repository of executive power. Below him lies a second layer made up of the prime minister, cabinet and other ministers who in practice lead the executive. Finally, the bottom layer includes public servants, police, government departments and independent statutory bodies who directly implement policy and laws.

Executive power is also difficult to clearly define. In the British context, it was defined by John Locke as all government power not legislative or judicial in nature. The key distinction is that while legislative power involves setting down rules of general application, executive power involves applying those rules to specific situations. In practice, however, this definition is difficult to apply as many actions by executive agencies are wide-ranging, binding and conducted independently of Parliament. The executive can also be delegated legislative power through provisions allowing for statutory instruments and Henry VIII clauses. Ultimately whether power is executive or legislative is determined on a case-by-case basis, and involves the weighing up of various factors, rather than the application of a strict test.

As most executive power is granted by statute, the executive power of the government is similarly limited to those areas in which the Commonwealth is granted the power to legislate under the constitution (primarily under section 51). They also retain certain powers traditionally part of the royal prerogative, such as the power to declare war and enter into treaties. Finally, there exists certain "nationhood powers", implied from section 61 of the Constitution. These were defined by High Court Justice Anthony Mason, as powers "peculiarly adapted to the government of a nation and which cannot otherwise be carried on for the benefit of the nation". They have been found to include the power to provide financial stimulus payments to households during a financial crisis and the power to prevent "unlawful non-citizens" from entering the country.

== Ministers ==
Ministers drawn from the Australian parliament form the core of the Australian Government. A subset of these ministers form the cabinet, the de facto highest executive body of the government. Ministers not part of cabinet belong to the outer ministry. Additionally, there are also assistant ministers (formally parliamentary secretaries), responsible for a specific policy area, reporting directly to a cabinet minister.

=== Cabinet ===
The cabinet consists of the prime minister and senior ministers and makes most of the important policy decisions of the government. Members of the cabinet are selected by the prime minister and may be added or removed at any time, usually through a cabinet reshuffle. Cabinet meetings are strictly private and occur once a week where vital issues are discussed and policy formulated. The cabinet is not a legal entity; it exists solely by convention. Its decisions do not in and of themselves have legal force. However, it serves as the practical expression of the Federal Executive Council, which is Australia's highest formal governmental body. In practice, the Federal Executive Council meets solely to endorse and give legal force to decisions already made by the cabinet. All members of the cabinet are members of the Executive Council. A senior member of the cabinet holds the office of vice-president of the Executive Council and acts as presiding officer of the Executive Council in the absence of the governor-general.

The cabinet meets not only in Canberra but also in state capitals, most frequently Sydney and Melbourne. Kevin Rudd was in favour of the cabinet meeting in other places, such as major regional cities. There are Commonwealth Parliament Offices in each state capital, including the original Commonwealth Offices Building at 4 Treasury Place Melbourne, and the Commonwealth Parliament Offices, Sydney located in 1 Bligh Street.

Until 1956 all members of the ministry were members of the cabinet. The growth of the ministry in the 1940s and 1950s made this increasingly impractical, and in 1956 Robert Menzies created a two-tier ministry, with only senior ministers holding cabinet rank, also known within parliament as the front bench. This practice has been continued by all governments except the Whitlam government.

=== Ministerial selection ===
The prime minister's power to select the ministry differs depending on their party. When the Liberal Party and its predecessors (the Nationalist Party and the United Australia Party) have been in coalition with the National Party or its predecessor the Country Party, the leader of the junior Coalition party has had the right to nominate their party's members of the Coalition ministry, and to be consulted by the prime minister on the allocation of their portfolios.

When Labor first held office under Chris Watson, Watson assumed the right to choose members of his cabinet. In 1907, however, the party decided that future Labor cabinets would be elected by the members of the Parliamentary Labor Party (the Caucus), with the prime minister retaining the right to allocate portfolios. This practice was followed until 2007. Between 1907 and 2007, Labor prime ministers exercised a predominant influence over who was elected to Labor ministries, although the leaders of the party factions also exercised considerable influence. However, in 2007 Prime Minister Kevin Rudd assumed the power to choose the ministry alone. Later, the caucus regained this power in 2013. According to reporting by the Sydney Morning Herald, ministerial positions are allocated by the Left and Right factions proportionally according to their representation in the Parliament.

== The role of the King and the governor-general ==
The King is not involved with the day-to-day operations of the government, belonging (according to the Bagehot formulation) to the "dignified" rather than the "efficient" part of government. While the executive power of the Commonwealth is formally vested in the monarch, the Constitution requires those powers to be exercisable by a governor-general, appointed by the monarch as their representative (but since the appointing of Sir Isaac Isaacs in 1931, always appointed according to the advice of federal ministers, rather than British ministers). Members of the government do not exercise executive power of their own accord but are instead appointed by the governor-general as ministers, formally as the "Queen's [or King's] Ministers of State". (Note: In a similar vein, the phrase His/Her Majesty's Government in the Commonwealth of Australia was historically used occasionally in formal legal contexts to refer to the federal government.) As such, while government ministers make most major decisions in cabinet, if those decisions require the formal endorsement of the governor-general in council, those decisions do not have legal force until approved by the Federal Executive Council, which is presided over by the governor-general.

Similarly, laws passed by both houses of parliament require royal assent before being enacted, as the monarch is a constituent part of the Parliament.

However, in all these cases, except for certain reserve powers, the King and the governor-general must follow the advice of the prime minister or other ministers in the exercise of his powers. Powers subject to the governor-general's discretion are known as reserve powers. While certain reserve powers, such as the ability to choose the prime minister most likely to command the confidence of the lower house, are uncontroversial, others are subject to much greater debate. The most notable example of their use occurring in the Dismissal of 1975. In that case, the Governor-General Sir John Kerr dismissed the prime minister and government due to his conclusion that the government had failed to secure supply. The propriety of the use of the powers during that event remain highly contested.

== Federal Executive Council ==
The Federal Executive Council is the body that formally advises the governor-general in the exercise of executive power. Decisions of the body give legal effect to decisions already deliberated at cabinet. All current and formers ministers are members of the council, although only current ministers are summoned to meetings. The governor-general usually presides at council meetings, but in their absence another minister nominated as the vice-president of the Executive Council presides at the meeting of the council. Since 1 June 2022, the vice-president has been senator Katy Gallagher.

== Departments ==
As of 13 May 2025, there are 16 departments of the Australian Government.

- Department of Agriculture, Fisheries and Forestry
- Attorney-General's Department
- Department of Climate Change, Energy, the Environment and Water
- Department of Defence
- Department of Education
- Department of Employment and Workplace Relations
- Department of Finance
- Department of Foreign Affairs and Trade
- Department of Health, Disability and Ageing
- Department of Home Affairs
- Department of Industry, Science and Resources
- Department of Infrastructure, Transport, Regional Development, Communications, Sport and the Arts
- Department of the Prime Minister and Cabinet
- Department of Social Services
- Department of the Treasury
- Department of Veterans' Affairs

Additionally, there are four departments which support the Parliament of Australia:

- Department of Parliamentary Services
- Department of the House of Representatives
- Department of the Senate
- Parliamentary Budget Office

== Publicly owned entities ==
=== Corporations prescribed by acts of parliament ===
The following corporations are prescribed by acts of Parliament:

- Australian Broadcasting Corporation
- Clean Energy Finance Corporation
- Special Broadcasting Service

=== Government Business Enterprises ===
As of March 2024, the following Corporate Commonwealth entities are prescribed as Government Business Enterprises (GBEs):

- Australia Post
- Defence Housing Australia

The following Commonwealth companies are prescribed as GBEs:

- Australian Submarine Corporation
- Australian Naval Infrastructure
- Australian Rail Track Corporation
- National Intermodal Corporation
- NBN Co
- Snowy Hydro
- Western Sydney Airport
- CEA Technologies

=== Other public non-financial corporations ===
- Airservices Australia

== See also ==
- Australian Public Service
- Referendums in Australia
- States and territories of Australia
- Timeline of the expansion of federal powers in Australia
