= Suburban Rail Loop =

Orbital rapid transit line under construction in Melbourne, Australia

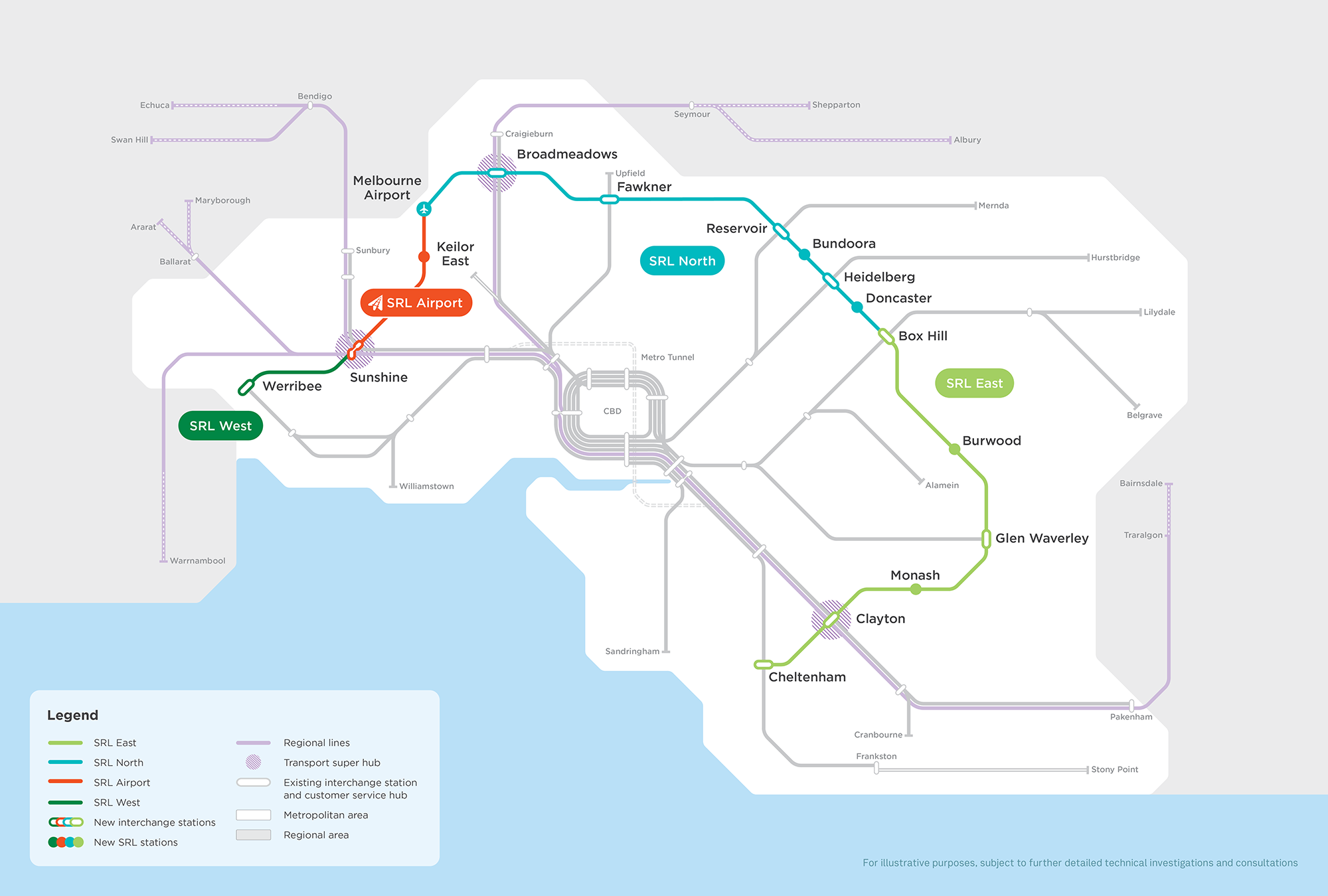
- Map of Suburban Rail Loop

Overview
- Status: Under construction (SRL East)
- Owner: VicTrack
- Locale: Melbourne, Victoria, Australia
- Termini: Cheltenham (Southland station); Box Hill (SRL East) Melbourne Airport (SRL North) Werribee (SRL West)
- Stations: 6 (SRL East); 7 (SRL North); TBD (SRL West)
- Website: suburbanrailloop.vic.gov.au

Service
- Type: Rapid transit
- Operator: TransitLinX (Note: comprising John Holland and RATP Dev when operating)
- Depot: Heatherton Train Stabling Site
- Rolling stock: 4-car driverless Alstom Metropolis trains (SRL East & SRL North)

History
- Work began: 2022 (SRL East)
- Planned opening: 2035; 9 years' time (SRL East); 2043; 17 years' time (SRL North); TBD (SRL West)
- Estimated cost: $31–58 billion

Technical
- Line length: 26 km (16 mi) (SRL East); 34 km (21 mi) (SRL North)
- Num of tracks: 2
- Character: Underground (SRL East)
- Track gauge: 1,435 mm (4 ft 8 1/2 in) standard gauge
- Electrification: 25 kV 50 Hz AC from overhead catenary
- Operating speed: 100 km/h (62 mph)
- Signalling: Alstom Urbalis Forward

The Suburban Rail Loop (SRL) is a rapid transit system currently under construction in Melbourne, Victoria, Australia. The system is divided into three distinct sections (anticlockwise from southeast): SRL East, SRL North and SRL West, connected by Melbourne Airport Rail between the North and West sections. The two main sections, SRL East and SRL North, are designed to form a single 60 km (37 mi) fully automated underground orbital metro line through the city's densely populated middle suburbs, with 13 stations between Cheltenham and Melbourne Airport connecting eight existing Melbourne rail lines and three major university campuses.

The SRL is a key part of Victoria's "Big Build" infrastructure initiative first proposed by the Andrews Government, aiming to make Melbourne the second Australian city (after Sydney) to build a fully automated rapid transit system. Several orbital rail schemes have been proposed and some constructed throughout Melbourne's history, but the rail network has remained radial with no peripheral connections among the existing railway lines. The Labor state government led by then-Premier Daniel Andrews announced the SRL as infrastructural policy in the lead up to the 2018 state election. Initial planning for the SRL was carried out in secret prior to its announcement, and, when the plans were released, it received significant attention. The SRL plan has been praised for its long-term vision and ambition, as well as being an innovative solution to the road congestions and commuting difficulties faced by Melbourne's transport network, but is criticised for its political motives, transparency of business case, prioritisation ahead of other transport projects, and exorbitant cost.

Although the Victorian government signed the first $3.6 billion contract with the Suburban Connect consortium in December 2023 to build underground tunnels, the conservative opposition Liberal–National Coalition remains opposed to the project. Then State Opposition Leader Brad Battin (Lib) announced in January 2025 that he would halt further development of the SRL if he becomes Premier at the 2026 Victorian state election. Federal Opposition Leader Peter Dutton (Lib) and Shadow Infrastructure Minister Bridget McKenzie (Nat) also vowed to scrap $2.2 billion in federal funding for SRL leading up to the 2025 Australian federal election, which the Coalition lost in a landslide. As of September 2026, the construction of six SRL East stations is still underway, with tunnel boring machines commencing digging in September 2026; the first tunnel boring machine started digging from Burwood towards Glen Waverley, with a second machine expected to begin excavating the second twin tunnel weeks later, with a third tunnel boring machine due to launch from Clarinda later in 2026. Jess Wilson deposed Battin in a Liberal leadership spill in November 2025, with Wilson reaffirming the party’s opposition to the SRL and committing to halt all development of the project, including current construction, if she becomes Premier at the 2026 election.

== Description ==
Upon completion, the Suburban Rail Loop will have three sections: SRL East, North and West.

The first section, SRL East, is a 26 km (16 mi) underground link from Cheltenham to Box Hill via Monash University and Deakin University. Construction commenced in 2022 with a scheduled opening in 2035.

The second section, SRL North, will be a 34 km (21 mi) underground extension of SRL East from Box Hill to Melbourne Airport, via La Trobe University. Construction is not expected to commence until the 2030s, with completion by 2053. This section may be split into two projects due to its length and cost.

The third section, SRL West, has not been defined in detail but would connect the city's outer western suburbs and may be formed by electrifying the existing Deer Park-West Werribee railway line from Sunshine and extending it to Werribee. No timeframe for construction has been released.

== Background ==
The Suburban Rail Loop, shown with proposed extensions to the Melbourne rail network

The Melbourne transport network was substantially developed in the late 19th century, when the newly available technology of the railway enabled population growth away from the city centre. The result was the development of a largely radial network, which, over the following century, reinforced a model of urban development focused on heavy daily commuter flows into and out of the CBD. Furthermore, a program of freeway construction in the wake of the 1969 Melbourne Transportation Plan reinforced the structure of the suburbs and introduced car dependence to new regions of development not served by the legacy rail network. As a consequence, Melbourne, unlike many cities of comparable size, did not develop any major centres of employment or dense population in its outlying regions over the course of the 20th century.

A number of orbital lines were constructed at the peak of railway development, but most failed to attract the necessary traffic of passengers and goods to remain sustainable into the late 20th century. The Outer Circle, which ran from Oakleigh on the Dandenong line to Fairfield on the Hurstbridge line via the Glen Waverley and Lilydale lines, was constructed between 1888 and 1891 but closed by 1897, though it was partly reopened as the Alamein branch line. The Inner Circle linking the modern-day Upfield and Mernda lines, was opened in 1888 but closed to passengers in 1941. The Albion-Jacana line and Newport-Sunshine line in the city's west, though performing a similar purpose, were never intended to carry passenger traffic.

In the late 20th century, interest grew in enabling orbital journeys between Melbourne suburbs. Included in the 1969 Plan were a number of orbital freeways, some of which were constructed over the following decades. The M80 Ring Road through the outer western and northern suburbs was constructed in stages between 1989 and 1999, and, by the time of its completion, was claimed by its advocates to have been partly responsible for a massive economic boom in the western suburbs, centred on its points of intersection with existing radial routes. (Note: This claim has been disputed; well-known public transport advocate Paul Mees argued that the assertion was "at best premature".) EastLink, a similar orbital freeway through the eastern suburbs, opened in 2008, but was less successful, failing to reduce traffic meaningfully on parallel arterials such as Springvale Road. Detailed plans for the North East Link, connecting the Ring Road and EastLink to complete the orbital route, were released in 2018, with construction expected to start in 2020 for an anticipated completion date of 2027.

Despite the investment in orbital road transport from 1990, little changed in the structure of the public transport network. No new suburban railway lines were built after 1930, and trams were increasingly delayed by traffic congestion on key routes. From 2002, the SmartBus program introduced three orbital bus routes in an attempt to meet the city's burgeoning need for outer suburban public transport. In addition to serving new corridors previously without mass transit, the buses were operated at a relatively high frequency and along direct routes, in contrast to the existing network of infrequent and circuitous routes. As a result, the SmartBus routes became the most heavily used in Melbourne, and were widely praised as a model for recasting the future public transport network.

== History ==
=== Proposal ===
In August 2018, three months prior to the 2018 Victorian state election, then Premier Daniel Andrews promised that a re-elected Labor government would undertake "the biggest public transport building program in Australian history", in a speech to the Committee for Economic Development of Australia. The comments were interpreted as a hint that as-yet-unannounced projects would be revealed closer to the election, although Andrews provided no detail in his speech.

On 28 August, Andrews revealed plans for the Suburban Rail Loop for the first time: a 90 km (56 mi) orbital line for Melbourne's rail network, connecting 10 of the city's existing rail lines and serving new regions of the middle and outer suburbs at an estimated cost of $50 billion. The government committed $300 million to complete a business case and feasibility study should it be re-elected, noting that the project would take several terms of government to complete.

In the days following the proposal, the government revealed that its plan had been under consideration within Development Victoria, a planning agency under the Department of Environment, Land, Water and Planning for 12 months. Controversially, neither Infrastructure Victoria nor Transport for Victoria, both established by the Andrews government, had been involved in the SRL's planning stages; furthermore, neither agency had identified the need for a similar project in their long-term plans for the transport network. Andrews defended the decision to develop the SRL independently of infrastructure authorities, arguing that while Infrastructure Victoria "have lots of good ideas, they don't have every good idea".

The tender process for the Melbourne Airport rail link project was launched in mid-September, and the state government confirmed that it anticipated the airport link would form part of the SRL West, with construction beginning in 2022.

In mid-October, Labor federal Leader of the Opposition Bill Shorten announced support for the SRL, including a commitment for $300 million in initial federal funding should the Labor Party be elected. The state government also indicated that it would be prepared to add additional stops to the loop to those included in the original announcement, particularly in the western suburbs.

Days later, a leaked document from Transport for Victoria showed that the SRL had not been included in the transport authority's long-term plan for the rail network.

=== Planning ===
$300 million was allocated to planning works for the SRL in the 2019 state budget. Rail Projects Victoria announced registrations of interest for potential contractors were open in June, and the first geotechnical investigations began in July in Box Hill.

The state government announced the formation of a Suburban Rail Loop Authority in September, at the same time as confirming station precincts for SRL East. In November 2019, the government announced that the loop would be an operationally independent, standalone line using different rail technology from the existing suburban rail network. The system would use new, smaller metro rollingstock that is four to five carriages long, allowing shorter platforms. The Premier announced an intention to use private investment to help fund the line, but did not indicate whether the line would be driverless.

In 2020, the government committed a further $2.2 billion for initial and early works on the loop, with expressions of interest opened for contractors to deliver these works. Jacinta Allan, who in her role as Minister for Transport Infrastructure had overseen the SRL since its inception, was given the additional role of Minister for the Suburban Rail Loop.

In the 2026 federal budget, the government committed another $3.8 billion to SRL East, bringing total federal funding to $6 billion.

=== Release of Business and Investment Case ===
Interactive map showing Suburban Rail Loop East in grey and its interaction with the existing lines of the Melbourne metropolitan rail network. Individual stations are not shown.

The Business and Investment Case of SRL was released in August 2021, primarily focusing on SRL East and North. SRL East will commence building in 2022 and is expected to finish by 2035. The rail line will be fully underground between Cheltenham and the Airport, while SRL West is subject to further investigation, planning and development.

The business case modelled two staging scenarios. The first scenario has SRL North opening in two sections, the first from Box Hill to Reservoir opening in 2043 and the second between Reservoir and the Airport opening in 2053. This scenario has estimated capital costs of $24.1 to $40.2 billion and total costs of $30.7 to $50.5 billion, with estimated benefits of $48.5 to $58.7 billion. The second scenario is faster but higher cost and has the section from Box Hill to Reservoir opening by 2038 and the full SRL North corridor from Box Hill to the Airport opening by 2043. This scenario had capital costs of $27.1 to $45.1 billion, total costs of $35.1 to $57.6 billion and benefits of $54.7 to $65.8 billion. The timing and cost would be further refined through the tender and planning process. This gave the project a cost-benefit ratio range between 1.0 and 1.7.

The government stated that it expected $30 to $34.5 billion would be spent on the project over the 14 years to the opening of the first stage in 2035, with significant works on SRL North taking place as part of that expenditure.

An Environmental Effects Statement (EES) process for SRL East was initiated in late 2021 that provided more detail on the station locations, the precinct designs, the local effects of the project and the design of the train system. Community and stakeholder consultation was launched as part of this process.

In October 2021, the Minister for Transport Infrastructure, Jacinta Allan, introduced legislation to the Victorian Parliament to establish the Suburban Rail Loop Authority as a statutory government body and to grant it a number of transport and planning powers.

SRL East and North will take more than 25 years to construct and together are estimated by the project's business case to cost between $30.7 and $57.6 billion depending on project staging, of which capital costs would be between $24.1 and $45.1 billion, and will be built entirely underground along new rail alignments.

== Under construction ==
=== SRL East ===
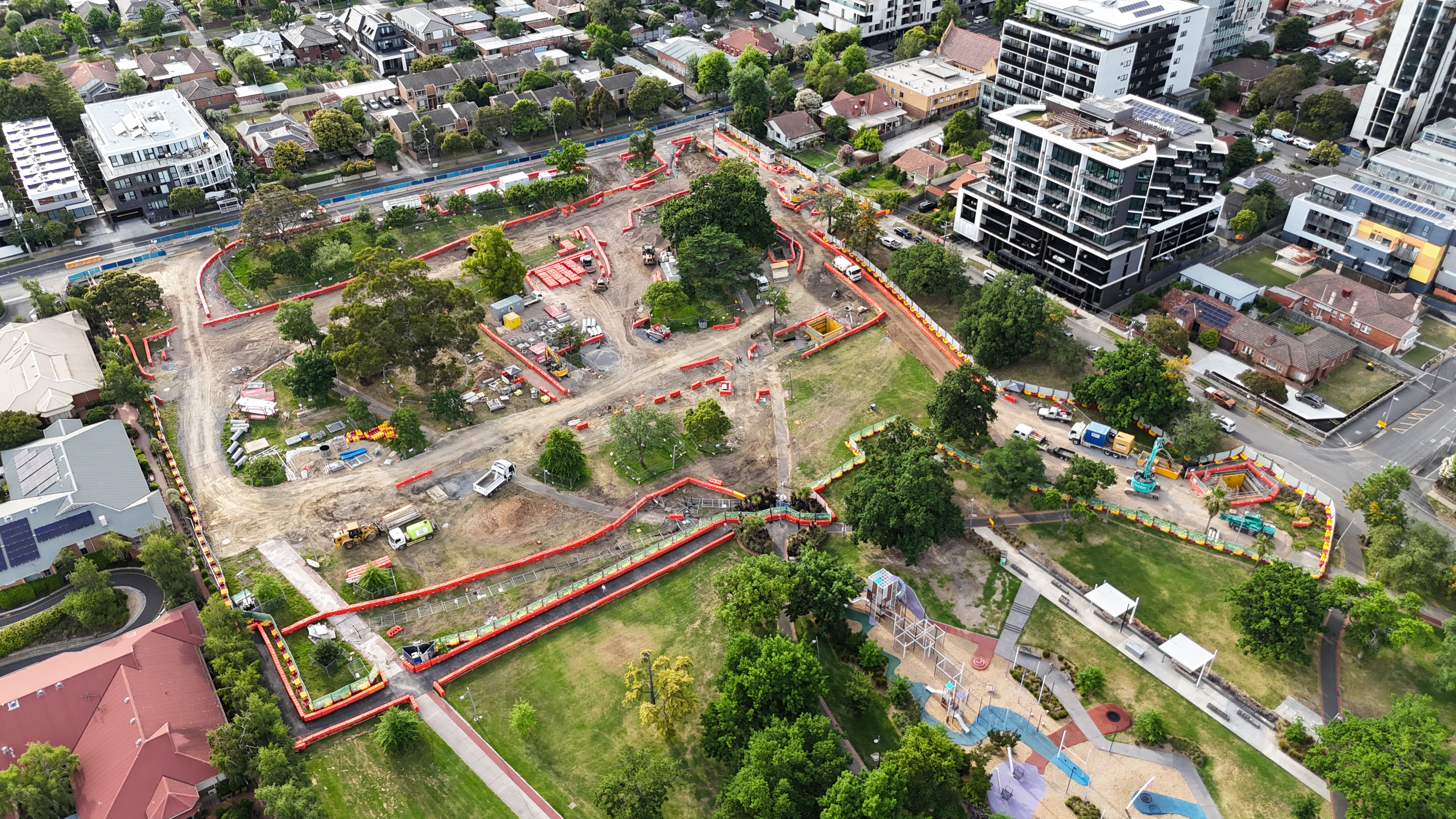
Aerial view of construction for Suburban Rail Loop East in Box Hill Gardens in November 2024

The first stage will connect Melbourne's eastern and south-eastern suburbs, including twin 26 km (16 mi) underground tunnels from Cheltenham to Box Hill via Monash University. Construction commenced in 2022 and is expected to open in 2035. Passengers will be able to interchange with the existing metropolitan rail network at Cheltenham, Clayton, Glen Waverley and Box Hill. Construction on SRL East began in mid 2022 and the first services are scheduled to start in 2035.

In August 2023, the Suburban Connect consortium consisted of CPB Contractors, Ghella and Acciona was announced as the preferred bidder for the first package of 16 km (9.9 mi) of SRL East tunnels between Cheltenham and Glen Waverley.

In December 2025, Victorian Premier Jacinta Allan announced that taxes would be raised through measures the existing land tax and windfall gains tax, new infrastructure contribution levies paid by property developers, car park levies, and through state-generated developments. The federal government has also promised to contribute $10 billion in extra funding. The state government also announced that a contract to build the new trains would be awarded to TansitLinX, which is a consortium that consists of John Holland, RATP Dev, Alstom, KP and WSP. The model of the Suburban Rail Loop trains are based on the Alstom Metropolis family.

== Proposed extensions ==
SRL East and SRL North will form one continuous metro line stretching 60 km (37 mi) from Cheltenham to Melbourne Airport. SRL West will be formed by an undetermined project, with Melbourne Airport Rail on the conventional rail network acting as an interchange link between SRL West and SRL North.

The SRL Strategic Assessment produced by Development Victoria in 2018 identified four distinct sections of the route, some of which are formed by other projects or existing rail corridors. The overall corridor selected was originally identified as a "middle" corridor, and was assessed against other routes closer to and further from the CBD before being prioritised for further investigation.

=== SRL North ===
SRL North between Box Hill station and Melbourne Airport would be constructed after SRL East, and include stops at Doncaster, a middle suburb long proposed for the terminus of a new rail line; Heidelberg station on the Hurstbridge line; Reservoir station on the Mernda line; Bundoora, home to the main campus of La Trobe University; Broadmeadows station on the Craigieburn line; and the airport itself. This section of the SRL would also be constructed entirely underground, and Broadmeadows would function as a "super-hub" for the Seymour and North East regional lines.

The 2021 SRL business case proposed opening SRL North in two stages, the first running from Box Hill to Reservoir and the second between Reservoir and Melbourne Airport.

=== SRL West ===
Apart from the termini at Sunshine and Werribee, the Strategic Assessment did not identify specific routes, intermediate stations or connections to other lines for SRL West, and suggested it would be the final section constructed. The Western Rail Plan published by Transport for Victoria in October 2018 suggested that the role of SRL West could be undertaken by electrifying the Deer Park – West Werribee line to Wyndham Vale station as an extension of the radial suburban network, and extending the Werribee line to meet it at Wyndham Vale. Later documents released by the government confirmed that Wyndham Vale would become an interchange station.

== Reception ==
=== Political ===
Following the plan's original announcement, then federal Liberal Infrastructure Minister Alan Tudge said that the Suburban Rail Loop's "big vision is great" but said the federal government would withhold its support until further details and costings of the plan were provided.

Then federal Labor leader Bill Shorten said that he "liked the principle" of the SRL, but would not immediately commit to supporting it with federal funding. He announced federal Labor's official support in mid-October 2018, committing $300 million in business case funding and saying the project responded to an "old map of Melbourne... [that] simply doesn't work any more". His infrastructure spokesman, Anthony Albanese, said that "this project here in Melbourne is the most transformative project for any capital city in Australia". Shorten later called the project the "Holy Grail" of public transport projects.

Then opposition treasury spokesman Michael O'Brien said that the SRL was a "plan for the next election rather than a plan for the next generation", and called on the government to send its plans to Infrastructure Victoria for independent costings and analysis. Despite the Coalition opposing the SRL, the plan was embraced by influential former Liberal premier Jeff Kennett, who called for bipartisan support for the project immediately after it was announced, despite expressing doubts about the accuracy of the $50 billion costing.

At the 2018 state election, the traditionally Liberal-held seats of Mount Waverley, Burwood and Box Hill – all falling along the path of the SRL proposal – were claimed by the Labor Party after large swings, leading to speculation among Labor MPs and electoral commentators that the SRL announcement had contributed significantly to the government being returned with an increased majority. The phenomenon was also replicated in a number of safe Labor seats which would benefit from the line.

In the lead-up to the 2022 state election, then Opposition Leader Matthew Guy promised to shelve the Suburban Rail Loop if the Coalition was elected, arguing that the project was a waste of money. The SRL became a major and contentious issue during the campaign, with Guy pledging to reallocate the saved money to health infrastructure. Described by some commentators as a politically risky move in Melbourne's eastern suburbs that would be connected by the line, Guy committed to honour the $2.2 billion early works contract but reappropriate the remaining $9.6 billion allocated to the SRL by the government. During the campaign, there was significant debate in the media over the project's cost and value for money. After the Labor government won a third term at the election with an increased majority, then Premier Daniel Andrews said the result was the second clear endorsement of the project by Victorian voters.

As of 2026, the project remains opposed by the state Liberal/National opposition. In January 2025, then-opposition Leader John Pesutto pledged to pause and review the project if the Coalition won government in 2026, citing concerns about large state debt, cost uncertainty, and the lack of funding available for other transport projects.

=== Media ===
The Age, in its editorial the day following the announcement, wrote that "there are so many reasons to endorse this proposal that it’s easy to get carried away", but observed that "good government is ultimately about more than just vision. It’s about having the inventiveness, discipline and fiscal capacity to make that vision reality", and suggested that the true test for the SRL would be the government's ability to complete it.

Herald Sun political editor Matt Johnston was less supportive of what he called a "highly political" project, arguing that the comparisons to other major global cities ignored the fact that "Australia is fairly remote, has a relatively small population and has higher labour costs". However, Johnston also noted that "the route of the suburban rail loop... would go near to, or through, Liberal-held state seats such as Mount Waverley and Burwood [and] near to, or through, federal Liberal seats such as Chisholm and Deakin".

In subsequent years, The Age has called for the project to be delayed or scrapped due to increasing debt on the Victorian budget.

=== Experts and lobby groups ===
The SRL was warmly received by the Public Transport Users Association, with spokesman Daniel Bowen describing it as "Big City thinking" in an opinion piece. Prominent public transport advocate Graham Currie also supported the plan for its potential to induce new development in the outer suburbs, although he admitted being stunned by the government's secretive planning process. The Royal Automobile Club of Victoria also offered in-principle support, saying that "it makes sense for the state to protect a rail corridor through what is now 'middle Melbourne'", although it also argued that the SRL should not overshadow other improvements to the network such as Melbourne Metro 2.

The SRL plan was criticised by rail lobby group the Rail Futures Institute, who argued that its benefits could be produced by a substantially cheaper network of orbital light rail routes. Marion Terill of the Grattan Institute was also critical, saying that travel demand did not warrant the investment required for the SRL.

=== Public ===
Media outlets reported massive levels of public support after the initial announcement of the plan. An impromptu competition organised by The Age to redesign the Melbourne rail network map to incorporate the SRL received entries from leading cartographers and attracted thousands of public votes in the days after the announcement.

== Criticism ==
=== Cost ===
Both the plausibility and practicality of the government's initial headline $50 billion construction cost for the project were the subject of significant commentary at the time of the SRL's original announcement.

Political opponents suggested that the government had wildly understated the cost of the project, with former premier Jeff Kennett calling the figure "irresponsibly and fraudulently inaccurate", state opposition spokesmen suggesting the cost could be between $50 and $100 billion, and federal infrastructure minister Alan Tudge later saying he believed $100–150 billion was a more likely range. Independent experts agreed that the project was likely to ultimately cost more than the government's claim. Prominent transport commentator Daniel Bowen, in a "back of the envelope" analysis, concluded that the government was "close to the mark" but expressed reservations about the accuracy of his estimate.

Separately, transport planners criticised the promises made by state and federal Labor for a total of $600 million in planning funding. The Age published comments from an engineer arguing that a "competent" business case could be completed for only $5 million. Some commentary also questioned the capacity of the state to fund the project without severe impacts on its fiscal policy, irrespective of its actual cost.

In 2022, Victoria's Parliamentary Budget Office (PBO) released analysis finding that the total construction and operating costs of SRL East and North together between 2022 and 2085 in 2022 dollars would be $29.214 billion, significantly less than other public estimates. In nominal terms, not adjusted for yearly inflation, the PBO estimated that SRL East would cost $36.5 billion by 2035, but that SRL East and North would together cost $81.7 billion to build when the final section opens in 2053, and $125 billion when including 30 years of asset expenditure and operational costs after opening to 2085. The PBO analysis was requested by the State Opposition, and the large headline figure prompted calls in the media for the project to be shelved. Minister Jacinta Allan dismissed the report, saying the Opposition framed the PBO request in order to obtain a large number, including unadjusted asset renewal expenses over fifty years. The PBO found that while the SRL would cost $29.214 billion in 2022 dollars, its benefits would be only between $17.757 billion and $21.133 billion, meaning a cost-benefit ratio of between 0.6 and 0.7 using a 7% discount rate (with every $1 of benefit in the future worth roughly $0.5 in present day value)

In March 2025, Infrastructure Australia released an evaluation of the project's first stage, SRL East, concluding that its costs outweighed its projected benefits. The report found that the benefit-cost ratio had been significantly overstated by the Victorian government and urged greater transparency around the business case. The independent body also criticised the business case for lacking sufficient detail on the full scope of the project, while relying heavily on assumed benefits from future stages that may not be delivered for several decades. It recommended that the government develop an “exit strategy” should future assessments continue to show limited value. The Victorian government, as with previous criticisms of the project, rejected the findings, maintaining its commitment and arguing it would drive long-term economic and population growth. The federal government, which has committed $6 billion to SRL East, stated it is considering the report's findings and that any future funding would be assessed in line with Infrastructure Australia's recommendations.

=== Patronage ===
The Strategic Analysis released by the government in 2018 projects 400,000 daily trips on the SRL by 2051, making the line the busiest in Melbourne. It suggests that morning peak would have a 60:40 ratio of clockwise to anticlockwise travel, with the balance reversed in the afternoon peak; by comparison, Melbourne's radial lines operate at a 90:10 ratio.

Independent analysis of the plan by SGS Economics in the weeks following its release broadly supported the Strategic Assessment, noting that if the SRL had been in operation in 2018, a 2 km (1.2 mi) catchment around each station would have captured "roughly: 270,600 jobs, 416,100 residents, 212,300 workers, and 112,600 higher education students". It argued that SRL East, consequently, would have served 30,000–50,000 daily trips if in operation in 2018, with the qualification that the level of service provided would need to make travel time competitive with car journeys. However, it concluded that the benefits and potential patronage of the North-East and two western sections were more nebulous, as their impact would depend on the efficiency with which the project was leveraged to create new development.

=== Politicisation of infrastructure projects ===
The initiation of the project's eastern alignment has faced allegations of being a form of pork barrel politics, as it strategically aligns with marginal electorates in the Victorian Legislative Assembly. Notably, stations along the Suburban Rail Loop (SRL) East, such as Burwood and Box Hill, are situated within electorates that the Victorian Labor Party secured in the 2018 Victorian state election. Furthermore, reviews conducted by the Victorian Ombudsman and the Victorian Auditor-General's office in 2023 and 2022, respectively, revealed shortcomings in the project's scrutiny and economic justification. Concerns were raised about the lack of transparency in the project's development and the appointment of ministerial staffers within the Victoria State Government. The Age published an article criticising the SRL being devised by only a few of Daniel Andrews’ trusted insiders rather than through regular government agencies or the bureaucracy.

The prioritisation of the SRL has drawn criticism that it has sidelined other infrastructure projects that span through safe electorates for the Labor Party, including the long-delayed Melbourne Airport Rail and upgrades to roads such as the Western Highway. Despite these criticisms, the state government has maintained that they are committed to other projects and that the SRL will complement improvements to the transport network in the long-term.

== See also ==
- Melbourne Airport Rail — an airport rail link project that connects SRL North and West, also part of the "Big Build" initiative by the Andrews Government
- Metro Tunnel — a sister rapid transit project in Melbourne, also part of the "Big Build" initiative by the Andrews Government
- Level Crossing Removal Project — a grade separation infrastructure project in Melbourne, also part of the "Big Build" initiative by the Andrews Government
- Transport in Melbourne
- Transport in Australia
- Grand Paris Express — similar project in Île-de-France region of France
- List of metro systems
