= Dandenong railway line triplication =

Australian railway project

The Dandenong railway line triplication project was an initiative of the Government of Victoria, Australia, to add sections of third track from Caulfield to Dandenong on the Gippsland railway line to increase capacity of and relieve congestion.

The project underwent a reduction in its scope after being first announced in 2006. The triplication was initially planned to extend for the entire Caulfield-Dandenong section of track, but in July 2008 it was announced that it was unlikely there would be a third rail track for the full length. According to VicRoads the more likely outcome would be that there would be three tracks for some sections and the existing two tracks in others. The Department of Transport amended its website to state it would undertake a program that included the addition of "sections of third track".

Elements of the plan were revived in a September 2012 Transport, Planning and Local Infrastructure Department briefing to the Government as part of an infrastructure plan for the expansion of the Port of Hastings. The briefing predicted additional rail tracks between Caulfield and Dandenong would be needed by 2022 to cope with additional freight movement.

== Scope and aims of the project ==
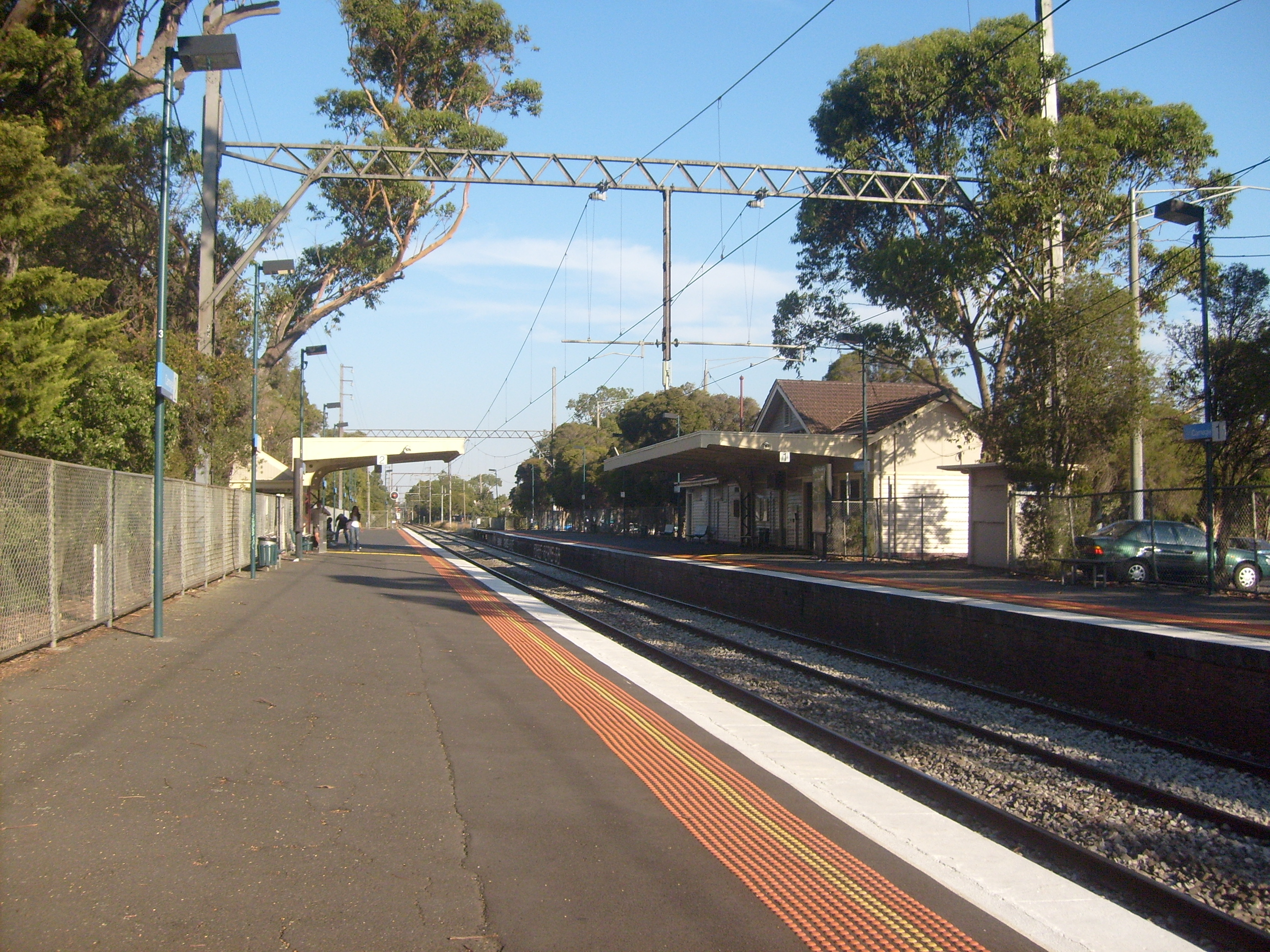
Double track railway at ground level through Carnegie station in 2009

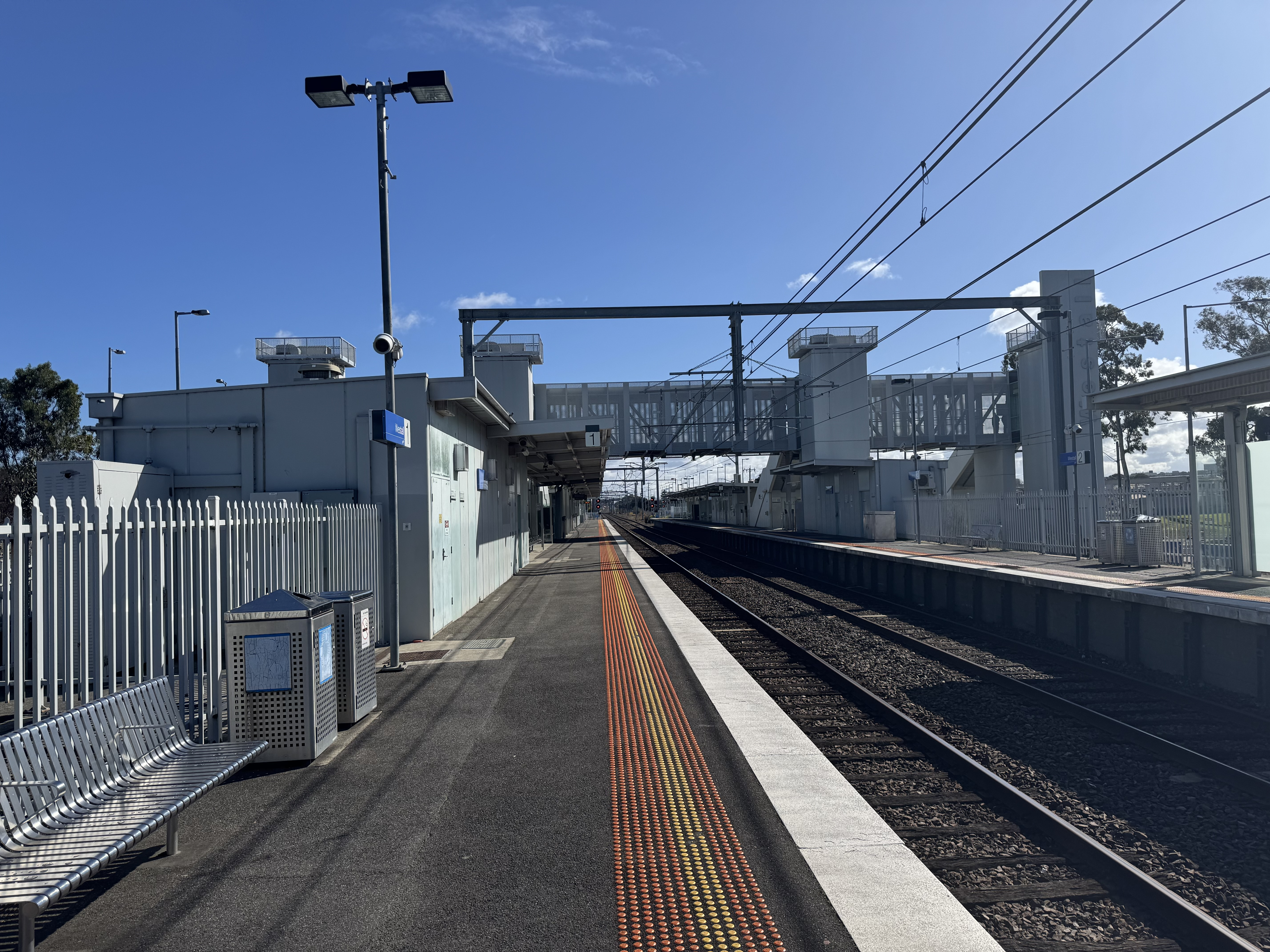
Westall station received a short section of third track and a turnback platform in 2010

The project was announced in 2006 as part of a major public transport policy statement called Meeting Our Transport Challenges and was estimated to cost as much as $1 billion. It was described as "the biggest investment in the rail network since the construction of the City Loop, [which would] deliver a substantial boost in the capacity of Melbourne’s rail network".

The network had been plagued with problems of overcrowding after a surge in passenger numbers, as well as increasing train delays and cancellations, much of which was attributed to bottlenecks in the network, chiefly on the Pakenham line.

The 2007-08 State Budget allocated $37 million of its $362 million train package for the first stage of the project, which funded construction work at Cranbourne station of stabling, a station upgrade and additional parking.

The second stage, due to begin in 2009, would have included additional train stabling at Westall station and a 2.7 km section of third track between Centre Road and Springvale Road. The 2008-09 State Budget allocated $153 million for the Westall project, claiming it would allow "short starter trains" to start and finish their journeys at Westall, running behind express trains from Cranbourne or Pakenham, and helping to even out passenger numbers across services on the line.

Later stages were to include the construction of a third track between Caulfield station and Springvale station (commencing by 2011), station upgrades and construction of a third track between Springvale and Dandenong (commencing between 2011 and 2016).

Bob Annells, chairman of Connex Melbourne, which was at that time franchised by the State Government to operate suburban passenger rail services in Melbourne, warned that there would be "considerable disruption" to rail services during the infrastructure works. A report on Stateline claimed the capital works project intended to reduce overcrowding and improve reliability "will mean things get worse before they get better".

The allocation of funding in the May 2007 Budget for works only at Cranbourne, 14 kilometres (8.7 mi) from the nearest section of the proposed third track, prompted speculation that the project was in doubt. The Age newspaper quoted "a source close to the Government" saying the Government had "gone quiet" on the triplication project in the Budget and that Treasurer John Brumby had commissioned a review because he was not convinced it was value for money.

The triplication had first been mooted in the 2001 State Budget and the 2005-2006 Budget allocated an initial $25 million for "consultation, planning and development work on public transport options for the Dandenong growth corridor". In a statement to the Victorian Parliament's Public Accounts and Estimates Committee in May 2007, then Transport Minister Lynne Kosky described the triplication as "a huge project; 15 per cent of the travelling metropolitan population actually use that line, so it services an area of more than half a million people."

=== Land acquisition and impact on road traffic ===
Kosky said the project would involve land acquisition "and we do not know exactly what those requirements are at this stage." She said: "We are also yet to assess the impact to level crossings on the corridors, because there is the capacity to actually reduce some of the number of level crossings, so grade separations are being considered as one mitigation measure, but it is yet to be determined whether they are included or not, and how many." Her comments on grade separations were contradicted a month later by a government transport spokesman in a newspaper article on the traffic congestion at the level crossing on Murrumbeena Rd adjacent to Murrumbeena station. The spokesman, Bill Kyriakopoulos, said grade separation at Murrumbeena "was not being considered as a long-term solution".

The last grade separation on the Melbourne suburban train network at the time was at the Middleborough Rd level crossing in Box Hill. The project, carried out in January 2007, cost $54.3 million.

A report on the track and its impact on traffic delays and congestion in the City of Glen Eira was presented to the Glen Eira City Council on 22 July 2008 following a meeting between representatives of council and VicRoads on 27 May 2008. VicRoads advised the council that it was unlikely a third track would be installed for the "entire length" of the line. The more likely outcome would be that there would be three tracks for some sections and the existing two in others. It said modelling to deal with subsequent road traffic congestion was to be undertaken on three options: Grade separation on (1) none of Glen Eira's roads, (2) all of Glen Eira's roads and (3) some of Glen Eira's roads. The third option would have the effect of channelling further traffic volumes on to any roads that were grade separated from the railway lines. The council concluded that it was not in the interest of VicRoads or the council to have intolerable levels of traffic congestion, and that it expected there would be detailed impact statements prepared, public submissions sought and the range of options examined by an independent panel appointed by the Transport Minister.

== Opposition ==
The triplication project was opposed by Melbourne public transport lobby group, the Public Transport Users Association, which advocated the alteration of stopping patterns and an increase in trains running directly from Richmond to Flinders Street as a cheaper and simpler alternative. In a report titled Getting Melbourne's Rail System on Track, it described the triplication project as "ambitious" and said it would "not only be expensive but also unleash years of major disruption on the line".

The project was also opposed in a report by Paul Mees, then of the Urban Planning Program, University of Melbourne, who concluded it was "an expensive distraction from the real issues. The problems of overcrowding, late running and cancellations are actually a result of poor timetabling and management, not of infrastructure limitations. The problems could be solved quickly and inexpensively if the real problems were dealt with forcefully." Mees advocated the use of spare platforms at Dandenong and Oakleigh stations and proposed a possible new timetable, which included city-bound trains passing through level crossings at stations such as Murrumbeena at the rate of 22 per hour between 7.30 and 8.30am.

The Victorian Liberal Party's 2006 election policy statement branded the triplication plan as "another example of (the Bracks Labor Government's) mismanagement and an inability to run major projects". The party proposed spending $3 million on investigating simpler, less expensive options to relieve congestion, including the construction of passing loops at various points such as Berwick and Springvale. It said problems on the line could also be overcome with improved timetabling.

== Plan revived ==
Elements of the triplication project were revived in a September 2012 briefing to Transport Minister Terry Mulder by Gillian Miles, deputy secretary of the Department of Transport, Planning and Local Infrastructure. The briefing claimed the existing two tracks between Caulfield and Dandenong would cope with freight train traffic for the next decade, but "beyond 10 years, commissioning of new container capacity at the Port of Hastings is likely to result in a steep change in freight demand ... demand will outgrow the existing infrastructure and additional tracks will be needed." The project, tentatively titled the Eastern Regional Rail Link, would involve widening the Dandenong railway corridor to lay dedicated track for freight trains and V/Line trains from Gippsland and also include provision for a new line along the Western Port Highway from Hastings to Lyndhurst station on the South Gippsland line. A government spokesman told The Age it was too early to determine if properties would be acquired for the widening.

== Subsequent developments ==
As part of the Level Crossing Removal Project, much of the Gippsland line between Caulfield and Dandenong was rebuilt in the 2010s retaining its double track layout.
