= Full-time equivalent =

Unit of measurement of an employee's workload

Full-time equivalent (FTE), or whole time equivalent (WTE), is a unit of measurement that indicates the workload of an employed person (or student) in a way that makes workloads or class loads comparable across various contexts. FTE is often used to measure a worker's or student's involvement in a project, or to track cost reductions in an organization. An FTE of 1.0 is equivalent to a full-time worker or student, while an FTE of 0.5 signals half of a full work or school load.

== Government ==
=== United States ===
According to the U.S. federal government, FTE is defined by the Government Accountability Office (GAO) as the number of total hours worked divided by the maximum number of compensable hours in a full-time schedule as defined by law. For example, if the normal schedule for a quarter is defined as 411.25 hours ([35 hours per week × (52 weeks per year – 5 weeks' regulatory vacation)] / 4), then someone working 100 hours during that quarter represents 100/411.25 = 0.24 FTE. Two employees working in total 400 hours during that same quarterly period represent 0.97 FTE.

The Office of Management and Budget, or OMB, the president's budget office, will often place upper limits on the total number of FTE that a given agency may utilize each year. In the past, if agencies were given a ceiling on the actual number of employed workers, which was reported on a given day of the year, the agency could employ more than this number for much of the year. Then, as the reporting deadline approached, employees could be let go to reduce the total number to the authorized ceiling on the reporting date. Providing agencies with an FTE ceiling, which is calculated based on the total number of hours worked by all employees throughout the year, irrespective of the total numbers employed at any point in time, prevents agencies from using such a strategy.

Although the generally accepted human-resources meaning for the "E" in FTE is "equivalent", the term is often overloaded in colloquial usage to indicate a "direct, as opposed to contract, full-time employee". The term WYE (work year equivalent) is often used instead of FTE when describing the contractor work.

=== United Kingdom ===
In the United Kingdom, full time equivalent equates to the standard 40-hour work week: eight hours per day, five days per week and is the total amount of hours that a single full-time employee has worked over any period. This allows employers to adopt a single metric for comparison with the full-time average. For example, a full week of 40 hours has an FTE value of 1.0, so a person working 20 hours would have an FTE value of 0.5. Certain industries may adopt 35 hours, depending on the company, its location and the nature of work. Whole-time equivalent (WTE) is the same as FTE and applies also to students in education.

== Education ==
Full-time equivalent students is one of the key metrics for measuring enrollment in colleges and universities. The measure is often annualized to cover the average annual full-time equivalent students and is designated by the acronym AAFTE.

Academics can increase their contribution by adopting a number of strategies: (a) increase class size; (b) teach new classes; (c) supervise more projects; (d) supervise more researchers. The latter strategy has the advantage of contributing to another key metric in universities - creating new knowledge and in particular publishing papers in highly ranked academic journals. It is also linked to another key metric - research funding which is often required to attract researchers.

=== Australia ===
In Australia, the equivalent to FTE for students is EFTSL (Equivalent Full-Time Student Load).

=== Example ===
A professor teaches two undergraduate courses, supervises two undergraduate projects and supervises four researchers by thesis only (i.e. researchers do not take any courses). Each undergraduate course is worth one-tenth of all credits for the undergraduate program (i.e. 0.1 FTE). An undergraduate project is worth two-tenths of all credits for the undergraduate program (i.e. 0.2 FTE). A research thesis is worth all of the credits for the graduate program (i.e. 1 FTE). The professor's contribution is 29.4 FTEs:

Contribution	FTEs allocated	Class size	Total FTEs
Course 1	0.1	100	10
Course 2	0.1	150	15
U/G Projects	0.2	2	0.4
Research thesis	1	4	4
Totals	–	256	29.4

To encourage more research some universities offer 2 FTEs or even 3 FTEs for each full-time researcher.

== See also ==
- Part-time student
- Workforce
