= Negative gearing in Australia =

Australian taxation policy

Negative gearing in Australia refers to the provisions within the Australian income tax system that allow taxpayers to offset net losses from investment activities against other income, a practice commonly known as negative gearing. Negative gearing can occur in several investment contexts; for example, with real estate investments, it occurs when the net rental income is less than the mortgage loan interest payable, and with shares, when net dividend income is less than the interest payable on a margin loan.

== General ==
For income tax purposes, Australia permits the offsetting of property losses against other categories of income, such as wage or business income, with limited restrictions. Negative gearing by property investors reduced personal income tax revenue in Australia by $6.7 billion in the 2014–15 financial year and $10.9 billion in the 2023–24 financial year. That figure is projected to reach $12.3 billion in 2024–25.

Negative gearing has been a recurring political issue in Australia, featuring prominently in the 2016 and 2019 Australian federal elections. During both campaigns, the Australian Labor Party proposed restricting negative gearing to newly constructed housing and reducing the capital gains tax discount from 50% to 25%. A report by the Grattan Institute found that negative gearing provides proportionally greater tax benefits to higher-income taxpayers than to lower-income taxpayers.

Treasurer Scott Morrison responded to criticism of the policy by citing tax data indicating that a larger number of taxpayers in middle-income occupations (including teachers, nurses, and electricians) claimed negative gearing deductions than did finance managers.

== History ==
Australian taxpayers have historically been permitted to offset losses from investment properties against other income. Previously, negative gearing was restricted by a prohibition on the transfer of contingent property income, and property losses could not be used to offset income from labour. Whether this restriction applied to losses as well as income remains unclear under the Income Tax Assessment Act 1936.

In 1983, the Victorian Deputy Commissioner of Taxation briefly disallowed deductions for interest in excess of rental income for Victorian property investors, preventing losses from being transferred or carried forward. That ruling was overruled by the federal tax commissioner shortly afterward.

The Hawke government subsequently quarantined negative gearing between 1985 and 1987, preventing property losses from being offset against income from labour. Property investors opposed the change, arguing that it had reduced investment in rental accommodation and caused rents to rise. According to an ABC Fact Check analysis, rent increases during this period were largely confined to Perth and Sydney, which also had the lowest vacancy rates among Australian capital cities at the time.

== Taxation ==
An investor who incurs a net loss on an investment property may claim that loss as a deduction, reducing the investor's total taxable income. However, investment property losses are disregarded in certain calculations, including the thresholds for the Medicare levy surcharge, the private health insurance rebate, HELP Repayment Income, and various Centrelink income-tested allowances and benefits.

In addition to the deductibility of losses, investors typically factor in anticipated capital appreciation and the tax treatment of capital gains under Australian law. If an investor holds a property for more than twelve months before selling, only 50% of the resulting capital gain is included in taxable income.

== Debate over the effect on rents ==
Economist Saul Eslake has argued that rent increases during the 1985–1987 quarantine period were limited to Sydney and Perth, and that these cities already had unusually low vacancy rates before the policy change, suggesting other factors were responsible. Eslake's analysis refers to inflation-adjusted (real) rents, calculated by subtracting CPI inflation from nominal rent increases.

Nominal rents nationally rose by over 25% during the two-year quarantine period and increased in every Australian capital city, according to official ABS CPI data. However, nominal figures include the effect of general inflation, making them a less precise measure of the policy's impact on rents compared to real (inflation-adjusted) figures.

== Effect on housing affordability ==
Chart 1: House Price Index and CPI. Source ABS

In 2019, Deloitte Access Economics modelled a policy scenario (Note: This 'ALP policy scenario' would involve "Limiting negative gearing to new housing" and "Reducing the Capital Gains Tax (CGT) discount from 50% to 25% for assets held longer than twelve months".) that would limit negative gearing to new housing and reduce the CGT discount. The modelling estimated that such reforms would, on average across Australia, reduce rents by 0.5%, reduce existing property prices by 4.6% (8.3% for Greater Sydney and Melbourne specifically), and reduce new property prices by 4.6%. Removing negative gearing alone was modelled to reduce average Australian rents by 0.1%.

Several academic studies have estimated the effect of negative gearing on house prices. The Grattan Institute estimated that negative gearing combined with the capital gains tax discount raises house prices by 1 to 2%. Economist Gene Tunny estimated the impact at 4%. Researchers at the Australian National University estimated the effect at 1.5%.

A 2015 report from the Senate Economics References Committee concluded that, while negative gearing has some influence on housing affordability, the primary factor is a mismatch between housing supply and demand.

In 2008, the Senate Select Committee on Housing Affordability in Australia considered evidence suggesting that access to negative gearing should be subject to limits. One submission to the inquiry argued: "There should not be unlimited access. Millionaires and billionaires should not be able to access it, and you should not be able to access it on your 20th investment property. There should be limits to it."

In 2003, the Reserve Bank of Australia (RBA) stated in its submission to the Productivity Commission First Home Ownership Inquiry that while there were no specific tax arrangements designed to encourage property investment over other forms of investment, the outcomes showed that "resources and finance are being disproportionately channelled into this area, and property promoters use tax effectiveness as an important selling point."

The RBA further stated that "the most sensible area to look for moderation of demand is among investors" and identified three areas for further study by the Productivity Commission:

- the ability to negatively gear an investment property when there is little prospect of the property being cash-flow positive for many years;
- the benefit investors receive from depreciation allowances that are later recaptured through capital gains tax at a lower rate than the rate at which the deduction was originally claimed;
- the general treatment of property depreciation, including the ability to claim depreciation on loss-making investments.

Chart 2: Investor Lending, New construction vs Existing property. Source ABS, RBA

== Politics ==
Negative gearing has been a recurring political issue in Australia, featuring as a significant policy debate during the 2016 Australian federal election and the 2019 Australian federal election. During both elections, the Australian Labor Party proposed limiting the tax-deductibility of negative gearing losses against non-investment income (with some exceptions) and reducing the capital gains tax discount to 25%. The Grattan Institute's analysis found that the tax benefits of negative gearing are disproportionately concentrated among higher-income taxpayers.

In 2024, a People's Commission into housing affordability was established to examine, among other issues, the effects of negative gearing on housing affordability in Australia.

In the 2026 Australian federal budget, the government announced that negative gearing would not apply to properties purchased after 1 July 2027, limited options to use the scheme will remain, such as new builds and government programs for investors.

== See also ==
- Taxation in Australia
- Capital gains tax in Australia
