= Variable =

Variable may refer to:

- Variable (computer science), a symbolic name associated with a value and whose associated value may be changed
- Variable (mathematics), a symbol that represents a quantity in a mathematical expression, as used in many sciences

== Mathematics ==
- Propositional variable, taking the value true or false in mathematical logic
- Random variable, a variable in statistics whose value depends on random events
  - Categorical variable, taking one of a finite number of values in a statistical problem, such as the head or tail result of a tossed coin
  - Independent and identically distributed random variables, statistically independent and having the same probability distribution
- Fluent (mathematics), a time-varying quantity as coined by Isaac Newton in his early calculus
- State variable, used to describe the mathematical "state" of a dynamical system
- Slack variable, inserted to transform an inequality constraint in an optimization problem into an equality
- Dependent and independent variables, a variable classified according to whether or not it depends for its value on another variable of interest
- Free variables and bound variables, restricted or otherwise to a specified set of values, such as through a logical quantifier
- Complex variable, the argument or value of a function of a complex number in complex analysis

== Physical and social sciences ==
- Variable (research), a logical set of attributes
- Control variable, a measurable entity which is constant (controlled) and unchanged throughout the course of a scientific experiment
- Variable star, a type of astronomical star

== Other uses ==
- "The Variable", an episode of the television series Lost

== See also ==
- Hidden variable (disambiguation)
- Variability (disambiguation)
- Variance (disambiguation)

.
