= Variance (disambiguation) =

In probability theory and statistics, variance measures how far a set of numbers are spread out.

Variance may also refer to:

- Variance (accounting), the difference between a budgeted, planned or standard cost and the actual amount incurred/sold
- Variance Films, a film distribution company founded in 2008
- Variance (land use), a deviation from the set of rules a municipality applies to land use and land development
- Variance (album) (2009), third album by electronic musician Jega
- Variance (magazine), an American online music magazine

== See also ==
- Covariance, probability theory and statistics
- Covariance and contravariance (category theory)
- Type variance
- Genetic variance (disambiguation)
- Invariance (physics)
