= Capital gains tax in Australia =

Capital gains tax (CGT), in the context of the Australian taxation system, is a tax applied to the capital gain made on the disposal of any asset, with a number of specific exemptions, the most significant one being the family home. Rollover provisions apply to some disposals, one of the most significant of which are transfers to beneficiaries on death, so that the CGT is not a quasi estate tax.

CGT operates by treating net capital gains as taxable income in the tax year in which an asset is sold or otherwise disposed of. If an asset is held for at least 1 year then any gain is first discounted by 50% for individual taxpayers, or by 33.3% for superannuation funds. Capital losses can be offset against capital gains. Net capital losses in a tax year cannot be offset against normal income, but may be carried forward indefinitely.

Personal use assets and collectables are treated as separate categories and losses, which are quarantined so they can only be applied against gains in the same category, not other gains. This works to stop taxpayers subsidising hobbies from their investment earnings.

== History ==
A capital gains tax (CGT) was introduced in Australia on 20 September 1985, one of a number of tax reforms by the Hawke-Keating government. The CGT applied only to assets acquired on or after that date, with gains (or losses) on assets owned on that date, called pre-CGT assets, not being subject to the CGT. In calculating the capital gain, the cost of assets held for 1 year or more was indexed by the consumer price index (CPI), which meant that the part of the gain which was due to inflation was not taxed. Indexation was not used if an asset was held for less than 12 months or a sale results in a capital loss. Also, an averaging process was used to calculate the CGT. 20% of a taxpayer's net capital gain was included in income to calculate the taxpayer's average tax rate, and the average rate was then applied to all the taxpayer's gross income (i.e., including the capital gain in full). So if a large capital gain were to push a taxpayer into a higher tax bracket in the tax year of sale, the brackets was stretched out, allowing the taxpayer to be taxed at their average tax rate.

From 20 September 1999, the Howard government discontinued indexation of the cost base and (subject to a transitional arrangement) introduced a 50% discount on the capital gain for individual taxpayers. Assets acquired before 21 September 1985 continued to be CGT-free. For assets acquired between 20 September 1985 and 20 September 1999, the taxpayer had an option of using indexation (up to the CPI as at 30 September 1999) or using the 50% discount method. Also from 21 September 1999, small business CGT concessions were introduced (below), reducing tax on small business owners retiring, and on active assets being sold, and allowing a rollover when selling one active asset to buy another. The 50% CGT discount is not available to companies. Superannuation funds are entitled only to a 33% CGT discount.

In February 2026 The Australian Financial Review reported that the government was considering changes to the capital gains tax discount in the lead-up to the May budget. The wealthiest fifth of Australians receive almost 90% of the benefit of the capital gains tax discount. The top 10% of earners receive over 80% of the benefit.

In the 2026 Australian federal budget, the government announced that the capital gains tax system would be replaced with one called "cost-base indexation", applying to assets that have been held for more than 12 months, this change will take effect from 1 July 2027. The government will also add a new 30% tax on capital gains from 1 July 2027.

== Exemptions ==
The law is framed so as to apply to all assets, except those specifically exempted. It applies both to assets owned outright and to a partial interest in an asset, and to both tangible and intangible assets. Current exemptions, in approximate order of significance are:

- Any asset acquired before 20 September 1985, known as a pre-CGT asset. But an asset loses its pre-CGT status if substantial changes are made to it (e.g. major additions to a building), or on the death of the original owner.
- The house, unit, etc., which is the taxpayer's main residence, and up to the first 2 hectares of adjacent land used for domestic purposes.
- Personal use assets, acquired for up to $10,000, including boats, furniture, electrical equipment, etc., which are for personal use. Items normally sold as a set must be treated together for the $10,000 limit.
- Capital loss made from a personal use asset. (s108-20(1)ITAA1997 … any capital loss made from a personal use asset is disregarded)
- Collectables acquired for up to $500, including art, jewellery, stamps, etc., held for personal enjoyment. Items normally sold as a set must be treated as a set for the $500 limit. If collectables sometimes rise in value then this exemption can be an advantage to a taxpayer collecting small items.
- Cars and other small motor vehicles such as motorcycles ("small" being a carrying capacity less than 1 tonne and less than 9 passengers). Since cars normally decline in value this exemption is actually a disadvantage. But the exemption applies even to antique or collectable vehicles, so if they rise in value then the exemption is an advantage.
- Compensation for an occupational injury, or for personal injury or illness of oneself or a relative. (However, compensation for breach of contract is subject to CGT.)
- Life insurance policies surrendered or sold by the original holder. Such gains are instead taxed as ordinary income (when held for less than 10 years). A third party who buys such a policy will be subject to CGT as on an ordinary investment.
- Winnings or losses from gambling (which are also free of income tax).
- Bonds and notes sold at a discount (including zero-coupon bonds) and "traditional securities" (certain interest bearing notes convertible to shares). Gains and losses from these are ordinary taxable income.
- Medals and decorations for bravery and valour, provided they are acquired for no (financial) cost.
- Shares in a pooled development fund, which is a special structure with rules facilitating venture financing. Certain other eligible venture capital investments are also exempt from CGT.
- Payments under particular designated government schemes, for example various industry restructuring schemes.

Trading stock is not regarded as an asset and instead comes under ordinary income tax. Items of plant being depreciated are subject to CGT, but only in the unusual case that they are sold for more than original cost (see Depreciating assets below)

== Operation ==
The capital gains tax law is expressed in terms of a set of 52 CGT events (see ITAA 1997 section 104-5), each of which specifies results such as gain, loss, or what cost base adjustment are to be made, and how to determine the date to use for the transaction.

The most common event is A1, the disposal of an asset. On disposal a capital gain arises if the proceeds are greater than the cost base, a capital loss arises if less than the reduced cost base. The date to be used is the date of the contract of sale (even if payment is not until later), or if no such contract exists then the date the taxpayer stopped being the owner (e.g. if an asset is lost).

The cost base of an asset is the amount paid for it, including associated costs such as agent's commissions. However, there are three forms, from lowest to highest amount:

- reduced cost base — this is the cost base with certain costs excluded, or certain extra reductions applied.
- cost base — being money paid, and associated expenses of the transaction, plus later capital costs of additions, or defending one's ownership.
- indexed cost base — the elements of the cost base each indexed by changes in the consumer price index. Each element is indexed according to the date the cost was incurred. This is relevant only for assets acquired before 21 September 1999.

On disposal then:

- if the proceeds are below the reduced cost base — the difference is a capital loss.
- if the proceeds are above the plain cost base — the difference is a capital gain.
- if the proceeds are in between the reduced cost base and plain cost base there is neither a gain nor loss. (Quite often the reduced cost base is the same as the plain cost base and this does not arise.)

Capital gains and losses in a given tax year are totalled, but in three separate categories according to the class of the asset:

- collectables (those above the $500 exemption described above).
- personal use items (those above the $10,000 exemption described above).
- all other assets.

The existence of separate categories for collectables and personal items works to prevent losses from them being offset against other gains such as from investments. In effect it prevents hobbies being subsidised.

Net losses in each category can be carried forward to future years, in their respective categories, but cannot be offset against ordinary income, or each other.

Capital losses are applied before the capital gains discount:

An individual makes a capital gain of $100 eligible for 50% discount = $50 net capital gain. If the person also had capital losses of $50, the losses would apply first and there would be $50 capital gains left over eligible for 50% discount = $25 net capital gain.

=== Reduced cost base ===
When a CGT event takes place on a CGT asset and the cost base is greater than the capital proceeds, then the taxpayer needs to calculate the asset's reduced cost base to work out whether there was a capital loss. The reduced cost base of a CGT asset has the same five elements as the cost base, except for the third element.

Common example of reduced cost base:

Greg acquired a rental property on 1 July 1998 for $300,000 and makes improvements of $50,000. Before disposing of the property on 30 June 2011, he had claimed $20,000 in capital works deductions. At the time of disposal, the cost base of the property was $350,000. The reduced cost base of the property is reduced by $20,000 to $330,000.

Prior to 1 July 2001, distributions from property trusts commonly included a so-called "tax free" portion which was subtracted from the reduced cost base but not the cost base, in a similar way. (See Property trust distributions below.)

=== Indexed cost base method ===
For assets acquired between 20 September 1985 and 20 September 1999 the taxpayer may choose between two methods of calculating a capital gain – the discount method described above, or the indexation method – whichever method results in the least tax. The indexation method is as follows:

- for each qualifying asset, calculate the capital gain: the difference between proceeds of sale of the asset and its indexed cost base, but with indexation stopped at the CPI as of the quarter ending 30 September 1999.
- capital losses are applied in the usual manner: capital losses (of the same or previous years) reduce the capital gain. If there is a net capital gain, it is included in taxable income and if negative the capital loss is carried forward to the next year.

For example: Individual purchased shares in 1987. The Indexed capital gain is $5,000 or Gross Discounted capital gain is $7,500. The capital losses are $4,000:

1. $5,000 Indexed Gain Outcome: Losses of $4,000 applied = $1,000 net capital gain
2. $7,500 Discounted Gain Outcome: Losses of $4,000 applied gives a balance of $3,500, which multiplied by 50% discount = $1,750 net capital gain

With only capital gains - the discount method is usually better (note indexation is better for small (perhaps only very small) gains). The choice is essentially between reducing the capital gain by the CPI rise of the cost base, or halving it outright. CPI indexation may be small, but if the proceeds are below it then there's no CGT. When the gain is above twice the indexation result, then the discount method is better.

== Specific assets ==
The following are matters relating to specific asset classes.

=== Gifts ===
A gift made by a living person is treated as a disposal at current market value. The giver is taxed for a disposal at that price, the receiver gets that as their cost base. (s112-20(1) ITAA 1997)

Testamentary gifts, i.e. made upon death under a will or under the laws of intestacy, are instead subject to rollover provisions in most cases (see Death below).

=== Part paid shares ===
When a shareholder is called to pay a further installment on part-paid shares, the amount paid is added to the cost base and reduced cost base. The date of acquisition of the shares remains unchanged.

=== Splits ===
When a company splits its shares, for instance 2 shares for every 1 previously held there is no immediate CGT effect. The taxpayer's date of acquisition and cost base for the holding are unchanged, only it is for the new number of shares. Likewise for a consolidation (reverse split).

=== Bonus issues ===
Bonus shares issued by a company from its share capital account are treated the same as splits (above), they only change the number of shares in the holding. However, there are complicated rules to apply when bonus shares are offered in lieu of dividends, or when they're part-paid shares.

Bonus units from a unit trust are similar to bonus shares. Fully paid units with no amount to include in one's accessible income (as advised by the trust), merely change the number of shares in one's holding, otherwise a set of rules apply.

=== Dividend reinvestment ===
Some companies offer dividend reinvestment plans allowing a shareholder to elect to receive newly issued shares instead of a cash dividend, often at a small discount to the prevailing market price.

Such a plan is treated as if the shareholder received the dividend and then used the money to buy shares. The dividend is taxed like any other dividend (including with any dividend imputation), and the shares are taken to be acquired for the cash the shareholder did not receive.

The investor would need to keep a record of each parcel of shares received under a dividend reinvestment plan, including issue dates and amounts of dividend applied towards those shares.

=== Identification of shares ===
When different parcels of shares (etc.) have been acquired at different times or for different prices, it is necessary to identify which ones are disposed of in a sale, since the capital gain or loss may be different for each.

If share certificates or similar are used then clearly the ones transferred are the parcel. But when shares are held aggregated in bank account style such as in the CHESS system used by the Australian Securities Exchange, then the taxpayer can nominate which of the original purchases it is that are sold.

In both cases the taxpayer can choose to their advantage, such as selling a parcel with a capital loss to realise that immediately, or keeping particular parcels until they reach 1 year old to get the 50% discount on gains.

A further option is available for parcels of the same shares acquired all on one day. If desired they can be aggregated to make one parcel with the total of the costs, i.e. averaging out the prices paid. This reduces paperwork if for example shares are bought at a range of prices through the course of a day.

=== Stapled shares ===
Some listed companies are set up so that their securities are "stapled" together. For example, each unit of the Westfield Group is three parts, a share in Westfield Limited, a unit in the Westfield Australia Trust, and a unit in the Westfield America Trust.

Taxpayers treat each part of a stapled security separately for capital gains tax purposes, i.e. calculate a gain or loss on each separately. But since stapled securities trade with only a price for the bundle, the taxpayer must use some "reasonable" method for apportioning the price across the parts. The Westfield Group for example recommends on their securities using the ratios of the net tangible asset backing (NTA) of each part.

=== Building allowances ===
A building allowance of 2.5% (or 4% in certain cases) of the original construction cost of a building is allowed as a deduction against income each year (until the original cost is exhausted). The amounts claimed as a deduction are subtracted from the cost base and reduced cost base of the building. (Note the allowance is calculated on the original construction cost, not a price later paid, and note also a building is a separate CGT asset from the land it stands on, and only the building cost base is affected.)

Building allowance works as a kind of depreciation, representing progressive decline over the lifetime of a building. But unlike the way depreciation has a final balancing adjustment against income, the building allowance instead gets that as capital gain (or loss) through it lowering the cost base.

As an example, if it is assuming a building is worth nothing at the end of the 40 years implied by the 2.5% a year allowance, the owner has had deductions progressively over those years instead of only realising the whole lot in one big capital loss at the end.

=== Property trust distributions ===
Distributions from property trusts (both listed and unlisted) commonly include two amounts which affect capital gains tax,

- "Tax deferred" portion of the distribution.
- Capital gains distributed, some under the discount method, some under the indexation method.

The investor subtracts the tax deferred part of a distribution from their cost base (and reduced cost base). It is called tax deferred because the investor pays no tax on the amount immediately, but will pay capital gains tax on it when they later sell the units, because it has lowered their cost basis.

Tax deferred amounts generally arise from building allowances, the same as for direct property ownership (see above). At its simplest it works as follows. Suppose a trust earns rental income of $100 and has building allowance deductions of $20. Then the net taxable income is $80 and that amount is distributed to unitholders to be included in their income. The remaining $20 of cash is distributed to the unitholders too, but it is regarded as a return of capital.

An investor's cost base cannot go below zero. If tax deferred amounts have reduced it to zero, then any excess must be declared as a capital gain in the year received. This is an unusual situation, generally it can not occur unless an investor has been able to get trust units for much less than the value of the buildings.

Capital gains distributed by a trust arise from the trust selling assets. They're taxed in the investor's hands the same as other gains. When there's a choice of discount or indexation method, the trust manager makes that choice.

Discount capital gains are distributed in already discounted form, i.e. already reduced by 50% for assets held at least 1 year. The investor must gross it up by doubling, apply any capital losses, then re-discount the remainder. (If one has no capital losses to apply then there's no change and the amount received is the amount taxed.)

=== Options ===
For the option holder, i.e. the taker,

- An option which is bought and then sold is subject to CGT like any other asset. If it expires instead of being sold then it is taken to have been disposed of at expiry for nil proceeds.
- When a call option is exercised, the shares (or other assets) acquired have a cost base which is the option premium paid plus the amount paid to exercise. The acquisition date of the shares is the date you exercise the rights or options to acquire the shares.
- When a put option is exercised, the proceeds for shares sold are the amount received in the exercise, less the option premium previously paid.

For the option writer, i.e. grantor,

- When an option is written, the premium received by the writer is an immediate capital gain. (This is the same as when selling other newly created intangible assets.)
- When a call option is exercised, the writer sells shares to the option holder. The capital gain from writing the option is reversed and the proceeds for the shares sold are the exercise price received plus the option premium received.
- When a put option is exercised, the writer buys shares from the option holder. The capital gain from writing the option is reversed and the cost base for the shares is the exercise price paid less the option premium received.

=== Share rights ===
Rights or options issued by the company allowing existing shareholders to buy new shares are treated as being acquired for nil cost at the same time as the shares were acquired. If sold then the proceeds are a capital gain (or not a capital gain if those shares were pre-CGT).

If the rights are exercised then the new shares are taken to be acquired for the amount paid and on the date exercised. If the shares were pre-CGT then the market value of the rights at the time of exercise must be added to the cost base of the new shares too.

Company issued rights or options bought from someone else (i.e. not issued direct from the company) are treated like options above.

=== Demutualisation ===
When a mutual society such as an insurance company demutualises by converting memberships to shareholdings, the company advises members of a cost base and reduced cost base for their new shares. That cost base represents "embedded value". The ATO publishes cost bases for significant recent demutualisations, such as AMP Limited and Insurance Australia Group. When shares are later sold a capital gain or loss occurs in the usual way.

=== Worthless shares ===
When a company is being wound up or goes into administration, the liquidator, receiver or administrator may make a formal declaration that they expect no residual distribution to shareholders (all money being exhausted paying creditors first). Shareholders may then, if they wish, claim a capital loss on the shares as if they disposed of them for nil consideration. If a subsequent liquidation distribution does occur then it is treated as a capital gain.

Liquidators were granted the power to make such declarations from 11 November 1991, and other insolvency practitioners from 11 May 1991. Of course a shareholder may always sell apparently worthless shares to a third party for a nominal sum to realise a loss.

=== Short selling ===
Short selling is covered under ordinary income tax, not capital gains tax. The reason for this is that in the first leg, i.e. the sale, the investor is not disposing of an asset they own.

=== Depreciating assets ===
When deductions are claimed for depreciation of an asset, and it is later sold, there a balancing adjustment to be made for the proceeds versus the written-down value. In the usual case that the proceeds are less than the original cost, then any difference between proceeds and written-down value is income or further deduction and CGT does not apply.

If however, the proceeds are greater than the original cost, then the amount between the written-down value and the original cost is income, and the proceeds above that are a capital gain. Effectively deductions allowed in past years are reversed then the usual CGT applies.

=== Share traders ===
A person for whom buying and selling shares or other assets is a business treats those assets as trading stock, and gains or losses on them are ordinary income rather than capital gains. The taxpayer needs to determine whether they fall into the category of a share trader or not.

There's no specific law on share traders, but the ATO publishes a fact sheet with guidelines based on court rulings . It includes examples of definitely trading, and definitely not. Factors include whether the intention is to profit, the repetition and regularity of the activity, and whether organised in a businesslike manner. (At worst a taxpayer can use the system of private rulings to get an ATO determination on particular circumstances they're in or are contemplating.)

A trader has the advantage that losses can be offset against other income (dividends for instance), and has a choice of valuing each share at either cost price or market price each year, so unrealised losses can be booked immediately but unrealised gains held back. The disadvantage for a trader is that the 50% discount on CGT gains for assets held 1 year or more is not available.

Prior to the introduction of capital gains tax in 1985, section 52 of the ITAA 1936 required taxpayers to declare (on their next return) assets they had acquired for trading. This was known as declaring oneself a share trader, but now there's no such election.

== Rollovers ==
Rollover provisions allow the deferral of capital gain, either by letting a new owner keep the previous owner's cost base, or by letting an owner switch to a new similar asset and keep the old cost base.

=== Death ===
On death, CGT assets transferred to beneficiaries (either directly or first to an executor) are not treated as disposed of by the deceased, but instead the beneficiaries are taken to have acquired them at the deceased's date of death and with cost base and reduced cost base as at that date.

This rollover does not apply if the beneficiary is not an Australian resident, or is a tax-advantaged entity such as a superannuation fund. In such cases the deceased is taken to have sold to the beneficiary at market value at the date of death, and the usual capital gains tax applies. Churches and charities are regarded as tax-advantaged too, but bequests to registered "Deductible Gift Recipients" are not taxed. Gifts under the Cultural Bequests Program are not subject to tax either.

Also, this rollover does not apply to pre-CGT assets (i.e. acquired by the deceased before 20 September 1985), in that case assets are taken to be disposed of at market value to the beneficiary, at the deceased's date of death. Being pre-CGT, there is no capital gains tax to the estate, but the pre-CGT status of the asset is lost.

Notice that for both pre and post CGT assets there are no tax liabilities to the deceased's estate for the usual case of transferring to an individual Australian beneficiary. This means in the majority of cases capital gains tax does not operate as a proxy for death duties or estate tax.

Unused net capital losses carried forward by the deceased from past tax years are lost with their death. These losses cannot be recouped by the estate or the beneficiaries (TD 95/47).

=== Marriage breakdown ===
When assets are transferred between spouses under a court-approved settlement following marriage breakdown, certain rollover provisions automatically apply. Essentially the spouse receiving the asset keeps the original cost base and acquisition date. Newly created intangible assets like rights or options have a cost base of only what was actually spent in creating them (solicitor's fees for instance).

Transfers not made under court approval are not subject to rollover, the normal CGT rules apply to any disposals. And if assets are not transferred at market value and not in an "arms length" transaction then for CGT purposes the transfer will be treated as having been made at market value.

=== Takeovers ===
"Scrip for scrip" rollover may be available for a takeover or merger where a shareholder receives new shares or new trust units rather than cash. When rollover is available the new shareholding is treated as a continuation of the old, with the same cost base and date of acquisition. Scrip for scrip rollover is available when:

- the original shares are CGT assets. Rollover is not available on pre-CGT shares.
- the value of the bid is high enough that a capital gain would arise if treated as a disposal of the original shares. Rollover does not apply to a capital loss that must be realised instead.
- the swap is shares for shares, or trust units for trust units. It does not apply to a change of structure.
- the takeover occurs on or after 10 December 1999, the introduction of this rollover provision.
- the bidder has made its bid available to all voting shareholders, and becomes the owner of 80% of the voting shares. This works to restrict rollover to genuine takeovers.
- certain other anti-tax-avoidance rules are not triggered. These apply to a target company or trust with just a small number of shareholders or where there's a significant common stakeholder.

The shareholder can elect not to utilise scrip for scrip rollover, and instead treat it as a disposal of their original holding for the value of the new shares, realising a capital gain. The shareholder can choose rollover on a portion of the shareholding.

Under Australian companies' law, if a bidder gains 90% acceptance it may force remaining shareholders to take the bid. Such holders are in the same position as those who voluntarily accepted (in particular note that the "compulsory acquisition" rollover below does not apply).

=== Demergers ===
When a company spins off part of its business as a new separate company and gives shareholders new shares in that new company, the taxpayer's cost base of the original shares is split between the original and the new holding. The company advises the appropriate proportions and the shareholder would allocate the original cost base between the two entities. The new holding is taken to be acquired at the date of demerger. The cost base of the original shareholding is reduced by the cost base of the new shareholding.

In certain eligible demergers rollover relief may be available, the company will generally advise of that. If available and if the taxpayer elects to use it, the new holding is taken to have been acquired at the same date as the original holding, and that includes being pre-CGT if the original was pre-CGT.

Usually rollover relief (when available) is an advantage, it preserves pre-CGT status and helps an individual meet the 1 year time period for the 50% discount on gains. However, on pre-CGT assets where the market value of the new holding is below its cost base, the taxpayer is better off not using the rollover but instead let the new holding be a CGT asset so the capital loss there can be utilised.

=== Destruction or compulsory acquisition ===
When an asset is compulsorily acquired by a government agency, or is destroyed and insurance or compensation is received, the taxpayer may choose between,

- Regarding it as a sale at that price.
- Rollover whereby the compensation is used to replace or repair the asset and it is considered a continuation of the original. The original date of acquisition is not changed, in particular a pre-CGT asset continues to be pre-CGT.

When rolling-over, there are rules to use when the compensation differs from the replacement or repair cost. And in particular there's a limit of 120% of market value if replacing a pre-CGT asset (so it is not possible to get a substantially bigger asset into pre-CGT status).

Note that these provisions apply only to capital assets, not to trading stock, nor to plant being depreciated.

=== Small business ===
Four capital gains tax concessions for small businesses have been available since 21 September 1999.

- 15-year exemption. Exemption from CGT for an owner who had a small business for 15 years and is selling due to retirement (must be over 55 years old) or due to permanent incapacitation.
- 50% active asset reduction. Capital gains are reduced by 50% for assets actively used in the business (including intangibles). The normal 50% discount rule for assets held at least 1 year applies too, in that case it is 50% off then 50% off the remainder, for an overall 75% discount.
- Small business retirement exemption. When selling a small business and not over 55, CGT is not payable on net capital gains paid into a superannuation fund. There's a lifetime limit of $500,000 on this exemption.
- Small business rollover. The net capital gain resulting from the sale of an active asset can be reduced by the amount spent on a nominated replacement asset. This is only a deferral of the gain, it is crystallised if the replacement is sold or its use changes (but a new further rollover can then be made if desired).

The key elements of a small business are:

- up to $6 million net assets. "Related entities" are counted against this limit.
- one "controlling individual" having 50% or more voting plus 50% or more economic interest. Or two such individuals if they own half each. But notice three individuals with equal stakes would fail the test, because none of them is in a controlling position.

The exemption for gains paid into a superannuation fund is similar to what employees may do with an eligible termination payment (accumulated unused long service leave, etc.) on leaving a job. But the small business case it is only the net gain after applying the CGT discounts which needs to be paid into the fund to escape CGT liability, the remainder can be kept in cash.

Changes have been made by ATO to relax some of these provisions. Check the ATO Website for details.

== See also ==
- Taxation in Australia
