= Genetic variant =

Genetic variant may refer to:

- Single-nucleotide polymorphism (SNP), in a case it is a common genetic variant
- Mutation, in a case where it is a rare genetic variant
- Copy-number variation
- Variant (biology)

== See also ==
- Genetic variation (disambiguation)
- Polymorphism (biology), the effect of genetic variants: a range of phenotypes
- Chromatin variant
