= Thriving Kids =

Australian Government policy

- Commercial?: No
- Type of project: Government disability support program
- Location: Australia
- Owner: Australian Government
- Established: October 2026 (planned)

Thriving Kids is the Australian Government's planned partial replacement for the National Disability Insurance Scheme (NDIS). It is targeted at children aged eight and under who have developmental delays or autism.

== Background ==
The government introduced Thriving Kids citing a need to reduce costs for the NDIS. In the August 2025 policy announcement, the government announced that they would seek to reduce growth of the NDIS to 5–6%.

Thriving Kids was detailed in a speech by NDIS minister Mark Butler to the National Press Club on 20 August 2025. Butler announced that the federal government would spend $2 billion to start the scheme.

The government revealed how Thriving Kids would operate on 3 February 2026. The program will begin from October 2026 followed by a full rollout in January 2028. The first part of the plan includes identification of support needs, the next involves connecting families to appropriate support, the last part of the plan involves how supports work in practice. The supports fall into three categories, these categories are known as "low need" that emphasise parent-led approaches, the next category is "moderate need" children would have access to more supports, children with a "significant permanent disability" include those with developmental delays or autism and will remain eligible for the NDIS.

On 22 April, NDIS minister Mark Butler announced that the number of participants on the NDIS would be reduced from 760,000 to 600,000 by 2030 with some being diverted to Thriving Kids.

The federal government injected $2 billion to get the program started in the 2026 Australian federal budget.

== Reception ==
Disability advocate Anthia Jacobson has expressed scepticism over Thriving Kids saying that "If this is to be a truly family-centred system, it needs to be designed with true family collaboration in mind and a structured approach to shared parental involvement in funding allocation and supporting choice."

Following Butler's announcement that the government will reduce the number of NDIS participants, crossbench MPs warned that this should only be done once Thriving Kids is fully operational.
