= 2026 Australian federal budget =

Appropriation Bill (No. 1) 2026-2027
- Submitted to: House of Representatives
- Presented: 12 May 2026
- Parliament: 48th Parliament of Australia
- Government: Albanese government
- Party: Australian Labor Party
- Finance minister: Katy Gallagher
- Treasurer: Jim Chalmers
- Total revenue: $815.3 billion
- Program spending: $833.3 billion
- Debt payment: $19.9 billion (0.6% of GDP)
- Deficit: $31.5 billion (1.0% of GDP)
- Debt: Gross 34.0% of GDP ($1,051.0 billion); Net 19.9% of GDP ($616.9 billion)
- Website: budget.gov.au

A federal budget was presented to the House of Representatives by Treasurer Jim Chalmers on 12 May 2026. It was the first budget of the Albanese government since winning the 2025 federal election and its fifth since being elected to government in 2022.

The budget contains a tax cut for Australian workers along with the partial removal of the capital gains tax discount and negative gearing.

== Background ==
In the 2025 budget, the government funded a new tax cut for low and middle-income earners to apply from 1 July 2026. The government also revealed that they would fund a $150 energy rebate for households and small businesses. The government also expanded the availability of childcare services to parents with three days of subsidised care.

In the Mid-Year Economic and Fiscal Outlook (MYEFO) for the 2025 budget, treasurer Jim Chalmers revealed that the deficit had reached $36.8 billion, $5.3 billion lower than forecast in March 2025. The update also expected the economy to grow by more than $8 billion over the next four years. In the MYEFO update, the government confirmed additional savings totalling $20 billion would be made over the next four years.

== Pre-budget announcements ==
The Sydney Morning Herald has reported that the government will not invest any further money in renewable energy projects in the budget. This puts a halt to an upwards trend in renewable energy investment since Labor came to power in 2022.

The news media has speculated that the capital gains tax discount may be reduced in order to improve housing affordability. The Sydney Morning Herald has reported that the government is considering cutting the capital gains tax concession to 33 percent or 25 percent from the current 50 percent, cutting the discount to 25 percent was Labor's policy in the 2016 and 2019 elections. The Sydney Morning Herald also stated that the government may also consider grandfathering the changes so that current investors are not affected, or implement a larger cut in income tax to commence on 1 July 2026. Labor MPs such as Mike Freelander have called on the government to take action in relation to the capital gains tax discount. The Sydney Morning Herald has also reported that the Liberal Party has signalled opposition to any changes, while the Greens appear supportive. The Sydney Morning Herald previously reported that the government asked Treasury for modelling before the 2025 budget regarding a cut to the capital gains tax and negative gearing but these proposals were not ultimately followed through on by the government.

On 30 March, the government cut the fuel excise by 26.3 cents per litre in consultation with the National Cabinet in addition to removing the Heavy Road User Charge, both were reduced for three months. This decision will cost the budget $2.55 billion and aims to reduce the price of a 65 litre tank of petrol by $19. All states except for Queensland and Victoria subsequently agreed on a GST (Goods and Services Tax) deal to reduce the cost of fuel by a further six cents per litre.

On 9 April, Guardian Australia reported that the government was preparing to cut spending to the National Disability Insurance Scheme (NDIS), the taskforce making the cuts will be led by former Treasury official Anthea Long.

The federal government is giving consideration to all options they can use to improve fuel supplies amidst the supply shock of the Iran war such as speeding up the electrification of Australia's light vehicle fleet, extracting more natural resources or an increase to fuel storage capacity. The government has estimated that increasing the fuel reserve from 30 days of diesel and 40 days of petrol to 90 days would cost $20 billion over four years. Energy minister Chris Bowen has stated this is a medium to long term priority. The treaty Australia signed up to authored by the International Energy Agency requires that Australia store 90 days of oil onshore.

On 15 April, the government announced that defence spending would rise to three percent of GDP by 2033 with a $53 billion boost over 10 years.

On 22 April, the government announced that they would reverse reforms made in November 2025 and fully subsidise assistance with showering, dressing and incontinence care in aged care plans. The government also announced that the NDIS would be made more affordable to the budget by reducing the number of participants by 160,000 from 760,000 by 2030 by diverting many participants to the Thriving Kids. The government will also reduce a rebate for Australians over 65 using private healthcare, the government marketed this change as being part of their tax reform agenda.

The budget will contain $10 billion to provide a 10 day increase to the national fuel stockpile from 20–32 days to 37 days while jet fuel and diesel will be set at 50 days, in addition to providing funding for the assessment of new fuel refineries, this package will also contain a measure to establish a government-owned fuel reserve with one billion litres of emergency diesel and aviation fuel.

The Sydney Morning Herald has reported that the government may cut tax breaks for EVs.

On 8 May, the government announced that they would provide Victoria with $3.8 billion of funding for their Suburban Rail Loop project.

The Sydney Morning Herald revealed that the budget would include $2 billion for critical infrastructure developments required to support housing with a quarter of the funds being used to support regional housing developments which the government says will support the creation of 65,000 new homes, in addition to $3.1 billion to build 100,000 new homes and $1.2 billion for states and territories to support new housing infrastructure.

On 11 May, ABC News reported that the government would fund a new artificial intelligence (AI) tool at a cost of $105.9 million to help developers submit environmental assessments faster. The government announced that they would spend $50 million to fund upgrades to the Sydney to Canberra rail line, with $25 million contributions from the New South Wales and Australian Capital Territory governments to take the total expenditure to $100 million.

== Policies ==
=== Taxation ===
From July 2028, the government will provide working Australians with a $250 tax offset, the change was not implemented for this financial year to avoid fuelling inflation, this will only apply to those earning income from wages or a salary, not investments. This measure will cost the budget $6.4 billion over four years. The government will also introduce a $1,000 instant tax deduction for work-related expenses.

The 50% discount on the capital gains tax has been replaced with a 30% tax adjusted to inflation by 1 July 2027. This means that an additional tax will be applied to asset sales such as cryptocurrencies, investment properties, shares or collectible items such as artwork. Pensioners and people on income support will be exempt from this revised system of taxation.

=== Housing ===
As previously reported, the government restricted eligibility for negative gearing and the capital gains tax. The budget changed the capital gains tax system to a discount based on inflation rather than the previous 50% discount, the budget has also implemented a 30% minimum taxation rate, pensioners and people on income support will not be subject to the 30% tax rate. The government estimates that these changes will help 75,000 people enter the property market and will reduce supply of homes by 35,000.

Foreign investors will remain banned from buying property until mid-2029, existing investors will be unaffected. The budget also contains $2 billion for councils and utility companies to build new infrastructure that will support new homes. The government will also fund the creation of a new AI tool to help developers navigate environmental assessment applications and speed up approvals.

The budget contains a $60 million Youth Housing Supplement that aims to unlock social housing opportunities for 4,000 people.

=== Defence ===
$53 billion will be allocated to defence spending, with Australia aiming aiming to reach 3% of GDP according to the NATO methodology by 2033. There is also $5 billion in savings, necessitating the withdrawal of the Royal Australian Air Force's fleet of 10 C-27 Spartan aircraft.

=== Government programs ===
The annual growth rate of the NDIS will be cut from 10% to 5–6% in the long term. Cost-cutting in the NDIS mean that 160,000 participants will be removed from the scheme by 2030, these changes will save the budget $37.8 billion. The government will also spend $2 billion working to start the Thriving Kids program.

The government is aiming to crack down on providers that maliciously utilise services like Medicare, the NDIS and the Pharmaceutical Benefits Scheme (PBS). The government forecasts savings of more than $5.42 billion.

The government will spend $1.7 billion on social services, aiming to improve service delivery at Centrelink, other department of the government have been asked to find reductions in staffing levels of 5% per year.

=== Trusts ===
There government is introducing a minimum 30% tax on discretionary trusts from 1 July 2028. A provision will be made for small businesses to move away from discretionary trusts in three years starting from 1 July 2027 and move funds into companies or fixed trusts.

=== Sports ===
The government will offer players and staff of the Papua New Guinea Chiefs NRL team a tax break.

The government will spend an additional 5% on sports over the next four years, some of this spending will go to infrastructure preparation for the Brisbane 2032 Olympic Games. The government will spend $307 million over two years on a program aimed at training elite athletes.

=== Travel ===
Australians travelling overseas will be required to pay an exit fee of $80, up from $70 in the previous financial year. There government expects to raise $755 million from this change.

=== Energy ===
The budget removes funding from a program that is intended to accelerate the development of Australia's green hydrogen industry. The budget also removes funding from programs known as Solar Sunshot and Battery Breakthrough. These policies will save the budget $1.3 billion over the next decade.

=== Migration ===
The migration system will be maintained at 185,000 places in the coming financial year, with prioritisation being given to migrants already in Australia. About 55,000 places will be allocated towards high-skilled migrants. The Working Holiday Maker visa program will also be controlled more tightly.

=== Healthcare ===
The budget cuts funding to a private health care subsidy for older Australians, this means that Australians aged over 65 will receive the same subsidy for private health care as other age ranges. The government has allocated $450 million of funding for Australians aged over 75 and Indigenous Australians age over 60 to receive a free RSV vaccination.

The budget has allocated an additional $1 billion for 5,000 more residential aged care beds, the government has also reversed a decision that meant older Australians would have to pay more for aged care services.

Public hospitals are being allocated an extra $25 billion over five years as the result of a funding deal agreed upon with the states and territories.

=== Business ===
The government will reduce the cost for businesses to comply with regulations by $10 billion per year in an effort to improve productivity. The government will expand venture capital tax incentives. The government will reintroduce permanent two-year loss carry back for companies with up to $1 billion in turnover, this measure is expected to help up to 85,000 companies each year. This productivity package includes a pledge to recognise migrants' qualifications in Australia. Fees of up to 1,600 to access mandatory Australian standards will be scrapped, electronic record-keeping with regulators will be simplified and climate-related disclosures will be made smoother. The government will make the $20,000 instant asset tax write-off a permanent feature of the tax system. A refundable tax offset will be provided to small startups.

=== Fuel ===
The government will spend more than $10 billion on strengthening Australia's fuel supply by increasing Australia's fuel stockpile to 50 days for diesel and jet fuel and 37 for petrol. The government is spending $7.5 billion on loans and equity to help stockholders meet their obligations. The government will also spend $3.2 billion to set up a government-owned fuel reserve which will hold one billion litres of diesel and jet fuel.

=== EVs ===
The government has reduced a tax discount for electric vehicle (EV) buyers, the tax discount will primarily apply to cars below $75,000 while more expensive cars will receive a 25% deduction from their fringe benefits tax rate, this will expand to all EVs by April 2029.

=== Bondi royal commission response ===
The government will spend $604 million over five years on measures targeting hate speech, violent extremism and social cohesion. The government will spend $43 million over two years to provide mental health support to communities affected by the tragedy in Bondi. The government will also give $102 million to the Executive Council of Australian Jewry over four years to improve safety for Jewish communities.

$69 million will be spent on providing the Australian Federal Police over four years with additional resources for its national security investigations teams. $25 million will also be spent over four years on improving firearm import controls.

=== Abuse survivors ===
The government has allocated $182.6 million over four years to prevention programs including training to help staff better identify, escalate and manage financial abuse risks.

=== Disaster recovery ===
The government has allocated $2.5 billion over five years to fund recovery from natural disasters as they believe that disaster recovery will become a more intensive undertaking. $6 million will also be spent on developing a high-speed national emergency messaging network called AusAlert.

=== E-bikes ===
The government will spend $6.6 million on implementing safety standards, recalls, online marketplace reforms and introducing nationally consistent guidelines on e-bikes.

=== Television ===
The commercial TV networks — Nine Network, Network 10, Seven Network and commercial radio networks — will be relieved of having to pay their commercial broadcasting tax until June 2028, this will cost the budget $111.3 million over five years. The Australian Associated Press will be funded with $15 million to support their journalism.

== Reactions ==
=== Pre-budget ===
Productivity Commission chair Danielle Wood suggested that changes to forms of property taxation should be paired with income tax cuts to alleviate any pressures. Wood also recommended that subsidies for EVs be wound back, she also admitted that the cut to the fuel excise was a "judgement call" but understandable. Shadow treasurer Tim Wilson suggested that any future income tax cuts could further fuel inflation.

Independent chair of the Every Australian Counts group that first campaigned for the NDIS George Taleporos said "Our community is deeply worried about funding cuts, more red tape, and changes that make it harder for us to get the essential support that we need. We fear being pushed off the NDIS towards mainstream services that do not exist".

The International Monetary Fund (IMF) issued a warning that governments should only issue cost of living relief in a targeted, timely and temporary manner while also stating that the organisation is fearful of a recession and warning central banks to be "vigilant".

==== Political ====
The Greens have called on the government to pursue "bold reform" in this budget, this follows their backing of Labor's plan to tax superannuation balances at a higher rate—increasing from 15% to 30%, balances higher than $10 million will be subject to an additional 40% tax rate.

On 17 March, a parliamentary committee endorsed changes to the capital gains tax discount, while the Liberals are opposed to such a change and would prefer to see more housing be built. A recent tax white paper by Wentworth MP Allegra Spender also mentioned that the discount should be reduced to 30% from 50%, while David Pocock wished to see a 25% discount.

MPs from the crossbench have warned that efforts to curb the spending growth of the National Disability Insurance Scheme (NDIS) may result in costs shifting to the health and aged care sectors. The MPs have said that the government should halt their ambitions to slow spending growth in the NDIS until their partial replacement, Thriving Kids, is successfully operating.

=== Post-budget ===
Homelessness Australia CEO Kate Colvin praised the budget's housing policies as containing a hard earned win for young people, among the praise was also Mark Degotardi from the Australian Community Housing sector.

Mike Zorbas from the Property Council of Australia criticised the budget as "a roll of the dice". Denita Wawn, CEO of Master Builders Australia criticised the budget for not increasing housing supply quickly enough.

Australian Medical Association president Danielle McMullen said that the budget would leave a funding gap of $9.6 billion run hospital funding and criticised a lack of Medicare modernisation. The Australian College of Nursing called for a national nursing workforce strategy, they warned of a projected shortfall of 70,000 nurses by 2035. The Royal Australian College of General Practitioners welcomed free RSV vaccination but was disappointed with racism in the health system.

The Business Council of Australia said that the structural reforms of the NDIS were important to return the scheme to its original intent. Australian Council of Social Service CEO Cassandra Goldie said that disabled people remained concerned about reforms to the scheme.

The Australian Council of Trade Unions welcomed the fuel policies as job-saving measures. The Climate Council criticised the fuel policies as a massive free kick for fossil fuel companies. The Australian Conservation Foundation stated that seven times more funding was being spent on policies that damaged nature rather than protect it.

Small businesses have criticised the increased capital gains taxation.

==== Political ====
Independent senator David Pocock praised aspects of the budget but criticised its lack of a gas tax, he said that "When you read through the budget papers, clearly, it sucks to be poor, it sucks to be old, and it sucks to be a native species."

The Greens said that investor tax perks were largely intact and criticising the lack of money for new public housing. The Greens criticised the cuts to NDIS and compared it to the government's defence spending. Independent MP Bob Katter said that the NDIS needed structural reform but that rotting by scheme administrators is the most urgent problem. Katter welcomed the increased defence spending but said that it fails to shore up foundations.

On 14 May, opposition leader Angus Taylor delivered the customary budget reply speech. Taylor proposed substantially restricting welfare to non-citizens of Australia, he also said that current immigrants would remain on welfare. Taylor proposed a net overseas migration cap be set at the rate of houses that are built. Taylor proposed that the tax system be indexed to make it more affordable, he proposed that from 2028–29 a Coalition government would index the bottom two thresholds to inflation, he says this will benefit 85% of income earners, the Coalition says this policy would cost $22.5 billion. Nationals leader, Senator Matt Canavan demanded an early election, calling on the government to take the tax changes to the Australian people.

Taylor vowed to extend the life of coal-fired power stations, extend the nation's fuel supplies to 90 days at a cost of $800 million, he also promised to promote domestic gas and oil production by removing regulatory barriers. Taylor committed to investing $5 billion in supporting infrastructure to build 400,000 new homes, Taylor also said that he would rewrite the National Construction Code from 2,000 pages to around 200, the Coalition says that these measures combined with broader deregulation would reduce the cost of building a new home by up to $70,000. Taylor said that the Coalition would direct 80 cents in every dollar of resource windfalls to a Future Generations Fund, Taylor says that the fund will help pay down government debt and invest in infrastructure and regions. Taylor proposed simplifying regulatory legislation. Taylor also promised to end the safeguard mechanism and other "net zero carbon taxes". Taylor also said that the Coalition would allow a business worth less than $10 million to deduct a $50,000 asset. Taylor said the Coalition would include a national security advisor in the government and develop a new national security strategy. Taylor opposes the government's changes to negative gearing, the capital gains tax and trusts.

Former Labor prime minister Paul Keating, who first introduced capital gains tax in 1985 as Treasurer, called the government's changes to capital gains tax "structurally sound" and the budget sought to address the inequality between wage earners and wealth holders, adding that the capital gains tax discount introduced by Liberal Prime Minister John Howard and Treasurer Peter Costello distorted the tax system. Keating later called on the government to hold firm on CGT changes, and resist calls to exempt commercial assets from the changes in the wake of backlash from small businesses and startup companies.

The Coalition has criticised the budget for imposing a "death tax" through the increased taxation of trusts, as it would apply to testamentary trusts (where some assets distributed in a person's will are not directly given to the beneficiaries, but are held in a trust to provide for beneficiaries, e.g. underage children or disabled relatives, who might be personally unable to manage a direct inheritance).

== Financial measures ==
=== Balance sheet ===
The budget includes total government spending estimated to total A$833 billion.

=== Spending by category ===
Budget paper number one provides a summary of spending for the fiscal year 2026–2027.

Federal government spending by major category
| Major category | Spending | Percentage of government spending |
|---|---|---|
| Total general public services | A$32.5 billion | 3.9% |
| Defence | A$52 billion | 6.2% |
| Public order and safety | A$9.7 billion | 1.1% |
| Education | A$57.3 billion | 6.9% |
| Health | A$136.9 billion | 16.4% |
| Social security and welfare | A$308.7 billion | 37% |
| Housing | A$11.5 billion | 1.37% |
| Recreation and Culture | A$6.2 billion | 0.76% |
| Fuel and energy | A$15.2 billion | 1.8% |
| Agriculture, forestry and fishing | A$4.7 billion | 0.57% |
| Mining, manufacturing and construction | A$4.7 billion | 0.57% |
| Transport and communication | A$15.3 billion | 1.8% |
| Interest | A$31.8 billion | 3.8% |
| General inter-governmental transactions | A$111 billion | 13.3% |
| Other purposes | A$20.6 billion | 2.5% |

=== Off-budget spending ===
The budget had A$32.5 billion of off-budget spending as described in Table 3.5 of Budget paper number one.

=== Revenue by category ===
Budget paper number one provides a summary of revenue for the fiscal year 2026–2027.

Federal government revenue by major category
| Major category | Revenue | Percentage of government revenue |
|---|---|---|
| Personal income tax | A$382.4 billion | 47.9% |
| Fringe benefits tax | A$5.5 billion | 0.71% |
| Company tax | A$154 billion | 19.2% |
| Superannuation fund taxes | A$31.5 billion | 3.9% |
| Resource rent taxes | A$1.9 billion | 0.23% |
| GST | A$103.2 billion | 13.4% |
| Wine equalisation tax | A$1.1 billion | 0.14 |
| Luxury car tax | A$1.1 billion | 0.14% |
| Excise and Customs | A$40.5 billion | 5.1% |
| Other taxes | A$6.6 billion | 2.0% |
| Non-taxation revenue | A$60.9 billion | 7.2% |

== Legislation ==
Proceedings for the budget usually begin at 7:30 pm with the Speaker announcing that the Governor-General has recommended an appropriation of revenue in accordance with Appropriation Bill (No. 1), this step is required by the Constitution. Following the Governor-General's message, the Treasurer will present the Appropriation Bill (No. 1) to the House of Representatives. After the Treasurer presents the bill to the House, the first reading will occur, this only involves the clerk of the House reading the bill's long title. Following the first reading, the Treasurer will move the second reading which contains the budget speech outlining policy and fiscal measures for the coming year, the Treasurer is not limited by standing orders in how long they can speak for. Following the second reading, debate is adjourned by the Leader of the Opposition who has the right to speak first when debate is resumed. The opposition leader's budget reply is televised like the Treasurer's speech. Following the adjournment of debate on Appropriation Bill (No. 1), the Treasurer presents additional budget papers. Appropriation Bill (No. 2) and the Appropriation (Parliamentary Departments) Bill are usually introduced by the Assistant Treasurer, at the same time customs and excise tariff proposals may be presented to the House, ministerial statements explaining the budget may be made, additional legislation may be moved or budget-related documents may be distributed. Debate on Appropriation Bill (No. 1) usually continues over several weeks and is known as the "budget debate", the scope of debate is not limited to the contents of the legislation as the appropriation bills are exempt from standing orders. When the bill's second reading has been agreed to, the bill will be considered in detail, the House will consider the schedule of funds being appropriated before they considering other clauses, most debate usually takes place within the Federation Chamber.

After the appropriation bills pass the House of Representatives, they must be passed in the Senate similar to other legislation, the Senate may consider proposed expenditures before the bills are introduced. When the budget is presented to the House, the minister representing the Treasurer in the Senate tables budget documents and related documents excluding the bills, details of proposed expenditure are referred to the Senate's legislation committees for the Budget Estimates hearings. During budget estimates hearings, senators are able to question representatives of government departments, this usually speeds up the passage of the budget bills in the Senate because of the chamber's extended consideration of the details.

According to the Constitution, taxation bills cannot be amended by or originate in the Senate. About 25% of government expenditure is authorised by appropriation bills, the remaining 75% is authorised by "special appropriation bills", this can take the form of legislation passed after the budget. Government expenditure can only be authorised by legislation approved by Parliament, this means that taxes cannot be raised without Parliament's approval, passing legislation to appropriate finances is often known as "supply". Although Parliament has the ultimate power to approve or deny any appropriation of money, the government has a "financial initiative", this means that only the government can request that an appropriation or taxation be increased or decreased, this is because the Governor-General only acts on the advice of the government and a message must be transmitted from the Governor-General before appropriations can be passed through Parliament. If the appropriation bills cannot be passed through Parliament, the government can pass supply bills to provide funds in the interim.

On 18 June, the government decided to tweak the budget by reinstating the 50% capital gains tax discount for startups and small businesses with a turnover of $10 million, up from $2 million, this decision was the result of criticism from business communities. The government also decided to add anti-avoidance measures onto the new tax rules for testamentary trusts.

On 23 June, the government allowed eight weeks of extra debate on NDIS changes. They also allowed an amendment from the Greens on their budget bill which tightened rules on a provision that allowed investors to purchase properties with their self-managed superannuation fund.

On 25 June, the government decided to retain capital gains and negative gearing tax concessions under a grandfathering measure pushed for by independent senator David Pocock.
