= Graham V. Currie =

Australian academic

- Occupations: Public transport researcher, policy advisor, and academic

Academic background
- Education: B.Sc., Geography; M.Sc., Transport Studies; Ph.D., Civil Engineering
- Alma mater: Huddersfield University; Cranfield University; Monash University

Graham V. Currie FTSE is a public transport researcher, policy advisor, and academic. He is a professor and chair at Monash University.

Currie's work has focused on public transport practice and strategy development. He contributed to a proposal for a Metro Tunnel, a concept intended to ease congestion in Melbourne, which opened in 2025. He is a fellow of the Australian Academy of Technology and Engineering and has been awarded the Transport Medal by Engineers Australia.

== Education ==
Currie received a B.Sc. in Geography from Huddersfield University in 1982, followed by an M.Sc. in Transport Studies from Cranfield University in 1984. He later earned a Ph.D. in Civil Engineering from Monash University in 2011.

== Career ==
Following a career as a public transport consultant, Currie has been working as chair in Public Transport at Monash University since 2003. He is the founder and director of the Public Transport Research Group at Monash University and the founder of World Transit Research Clearinghouse. He also holds Australia's first professorship in public transport at Monash University.

Currie has advised the Victorian Office of the Auditor General, and was elected president of the Australasian Transport Research Forum (ATRF). Since 1996, he has been a specialist advisor to international agencies on transport planning for large-scale events.

== Research ==
Currie's research has examined public transport practice, equity, and service quality using analytical and policy approaches.

=== Public transport practice ===
Currie highlighted the need for the Metro Tunnel, an underground rail tunnel project to ease pressure on Melbourne's crowded public transport system, which opened in 2025, and provided the research foundation and design rationale that helped shape the project's eventual adoption. He also offered analysis on the financial arrangements supporting public transport during the post-pandemic patronage downturn. In related research, he demonstrated that fare evasion can be either intentional or accidental, and sometimes involves smaller acts like using a cheaper ticket when a higher fare is required. He co‑developed a structural model that segments fare evaders into accidental, unintentional, calculated, and habitual groups to distinguish deliberate from unintended evasion. He further showed that persistent evaders resist enforcement due to deeper economic or ideological factors.

=== Transport equity and accessibility ===
Currie's research has focused on public transport planning and policy, with attention to accessibility, service quality, and addressing transport disadvantages for marginalized populations. His books No Way to Go: Transport and Social Disadvantage in Australian Communities and Handbook of Public Transport Research both examine how public transport systems intersect with broader social issues. He has developed frameworks to measure and improve transport equity while identifying regions with inadequate services. In his book New Perspectives and Methods in Transport and Social Exclusion Research, he presented new methods and insights for analysing transport disadvantage and social exclusion, linking accessibility, well-being, and social justice.

=== Transit service quality and network design ===
Currie's work has also analysed the broader international evidence that higher-quality transit service significantly increases use. His regression analysis indicated that station-level service quality is the primary driver of rail passenger flows. In a collaborative study, he showed that network design and transfer behaviour are linked and that they influence transit performance, though broader network effects remain limited. His analyses identified key factors influencing Bus Rapid Transit (BRT) ridership at system and route levels, highlighting both the importance and analytical complexity of service-supply variables due to potential endogeneity.

== Awards and honors ==
- 2012, 2016 – William W. Millar Award, US Transportation Research Board
- 2017, 2021 – John H. Taplin Prize, Australasian Transport Research Forum
- 2017 – Fellow, Australian Academy of Technology and Engineering
- 2020 – Transport Medal, Engineers Australia

== Bibliography ==
=== Selected books ===
- Currie, Graham Victor; Gammie, Fergus; Waingold, Charles; Paterson, Darryn; Vandersar, Davinia (2005). Rural and Regional Young People and Transport - Improving Access to Transport for Young People in Rural and Regional Australia. Australian Government Dept of Family and Community Service. ISBN 9780975249857.
- Currie, Graham; Stanley, Janet Robin (2007). No Way to Go: Transport and Social Disadvantage in Australian Communities. Monash University Publishing. ISBN 9780980361629.
- Currie, Graham (2011). New Perspectives and Methods in Transport and Social Exclusion Research. Emerald Group Publishing Limited. ISBN 9781780522005.
- Currie, Graham (2021). The Handbook of Public Transport Research. Edward Elgar Publishing Limited. ISBN 9781788978651.

=== Selected articles ===
- Currie, Graham (2010). "Quantifying spatial gaps in public transport supply based on social needs". Journal of Transport Geography. 18 (1): 31–41. Bibcode:2010JTGeo..18...31C. doi:10.1016/j.jtrangeo.2008.12.002.
- Currie, Graham; Richardson, Tony; Smyth, Paul; Vella-Brodrick, Dianne; Hine, Julian; Lucas, Karen; Stanley, Janet; Morris, Jenny (2010). "Investigating links between transport disadvantage, social exclusion and well-being in Melbourne – Updated results". Research in Transportation Economics. 29 (1): 287–295. doi:10.1016/j.retrec.2010.07.036.
- Delbosc, Alexa; Currie, Graham (2011). "Using Lorenz curves to assess public transport equity". Journal of Transport Geography. 19 (6): 1252–1259. Bibcode:2011JTGeo..19.1252D. doi:10.1016/j.jtrangeo.2011.02.008.
- Delbosc, Alexa; Currie, Graham (2011). "The spatial context of transport disadvantage, social exclusion and well-being". Journal of Transport Geography. 19 (6): 1130–1137. Bibcode:2011JTGeo..19.1130D. doi:10.1016/j.jtrangeo.2011.04.005.
- Faisal, Asif; Yigitcanlar, Tan; Kamruzzaman, Md.; Currie, Graham (2019). "Understanding autonomous vehicles: A systematic literature review on capability, impact, planning and policy". Journal of Transport and Land Use. 12 (1). doi:10.5198/jtlu.2019.1405.
