= Daniel Bowen =

Australian blogger

Daniel Bowen (born 1970) is an Australian blogger who resides in Melbourne. He is best known for having been the president of the Public Transport Users Association (PTUA), and the author of the blog, Diary of an Average Australian. Bowen has published this blog continuously since 1994. His other web articles include Toxic Custard, sent weekly to a mailing list and posted to Usenet group rec.humor (under the title "Toxic Custard Workshop Files") since August 1990. TCWF started out as a humour journal covering and parodying subjects such as religion, science fiction, history and technology, but over the years it has gradually changed into a diary, and today is mostly a compilation of the passing week's blog posts.

Bowen is also a prominent advocate for improved public transport in Melbourne, in particular as a former president of the PTUA, a position he held from 2003 to 2012, and he continues to be a frequent media commentator and blogger on public transport issues.

On 17 September 2012, he announced that he would not seek re-election as PTUA president at the forthcoming annual general meeting of the Association. He remains on the PTUA Committee.
