= Hidden variable =

Hidden variable may refer to:

- Confounding, in statistics, an extraneous variable in a statistical model that correlates (directly or inversely) with both the dependent variable and the independent variable
- Hidden transformation, in computer science, a way to transform a generic constraint satisfaction problem into a binary one by introducing new hidden variables
- Hidden-variable theory, in physics, the proposition that statistical models of physical systems (such as Quantum mechanics) are inherently incomplete, and that the apparent unpredictability of such systems is actually due to the influence of additional, putative yet-unseen or unmeasurable factors
  - Local hidden-variable theory, in quantum mechanics, a hidden-variable theory in which distant events are assumed to have no instantaneous (or at least faster-than-light) effect on local events
- Latent variable, in statistics, a variable that is inferred from other observed variables

== See also ==
- Hidden dependency
- Hidden side effect
- Infrequent variables
