= Paul Mees =

Australian transport planner (1961–2013)

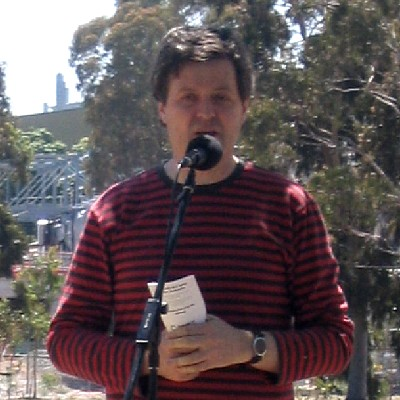
- Paul Mees in 2006
- Born: March 20, 1961; Melbourne, Australia
- Died: June 19, 2013 (aged 52); Melbourne, Australia
- Education: University of Melbourne
- Occupation: Lawyer Transport Activist
- Years active: 1980s-2013
- Known for: Transport activisim

Paul Mees OAM (20 March 1961 – 19 June 2013) was an Australian academic, specialising in urban planning and public transport.

Mees died on 19 June 2013, 14 months after the diagnosis of kidney cancer. He was 52. At the time of his death he was an associate professor in the School of Global, Urban and Social Studies at RMIT University.

An educator andresearcher, Mees was also recognized outside academic circles for his advocacy and activism in support of public transport as a means of sustainable transport, particularly in urban areas. In both his campaigning and academic work Mees confronted interests, questioned the current situation and challenged common community perceptions of good policy and practice – often courting controversy. It was the fusion of his achievements as a scholar and as an activist that set Mees apart from many of his academic peers.

Shortly after his death, Senator Penny Wright, a fellow law student and debating colleague, paid tribute to Mees in the Australian Senate. More recently he was recognised for his achievements in the Australia Day Honours of 2014, posthumously awarded the Medal of the Order of Australia (OAM) for "service to public transport and urban planning as an academic and advocate for creating sustainable cities".

== Scholarship ==
Mees began his professional career as a lawyer in the mid-1980s. Having graduated with a Bachelor of Arts and Bachelor of Laws (Hons) from the University of Melbourne, he was admitted to practice as a barrister and solicitor of the Supreme Court of Victoria. He practised mostly in industrial relations law, first at Melbourne law firm Gill Kane & Co and later at Maurice Blackburn.

In the early 1990s Mees left the law to return to study, his doctoral research at the University of Melbourne involving a comparison of public transport in Toronto and Melbourne, and his thesis accounted for the relative success of the former compared to the latter in the post-war period, given the otherwise physical and demographic similarities of the two cities. He gained his PhD in 1997. His thesis, which was later published under the title A Very Public Solution is considered an authoritative text in the field.

After a period as a research fellow at the Australian National University's Urban Research Program, in 1998 Mees returned to the University of Melbourne to teach and research. In 2008, amid a public furore over academic independence, he was demoted by the university. Its key complaint related to public criticisms Mees had made about state government officials, although a subsequent investigation dismissed the university's complaints. By that time, however, Mees had resigned to take up an appointment at RMIT University. Promoted to associate professor in 2012, Mees researched and taught at RMIT until his death.

Mees's work was principally concerned with the planning of public transport in cities. He was a strong advocate for public transport, but less keen on urban bicycles as a realistic mass transport solution. His work provided the basis for the European Union's 2005 HiTrans project on improving public transport in medium-sized cities and towns. He was also a member of the international advisory council for Paris's New Mobility Agenda Project. His most recent research was on planning decision support tools for multimodal urban transport systems, and improvements to urban public transport planning in Australia.

== Activism ==
With an early interest in environmental and social justice issues, Mees studied environmental law as part of his undergraduate degree. In the 1980s his interests segued to a focus on sustainable transport, and he became involved in public transport advocacy through the Public Transport Users Association in Melbourne, becoming president of the organisation from 1992 to 2001.

Mees was an articulate contributor to public debates on transport planning in Victoria, Australia over three decades, and renown authority on public transport and urban planning in Australia. In addition to the public platforms he shared with experts and commentators, Mees was a sought-after media spokesperson, making hundreds of appearances in both print and electronic media around Australia over the decades. Only a month before he died he was interviewed on ABC TV's 7.30.

Among the activist projects with which Mees involved himself were legal actions attempting to prevent the construction of expensive transport projects contrary to his views on what constituted good public transport policy. In the late 1990s he questioned the legality of aspects of the largest urban infrastructure project in Australia's history, the CityLink tollway system in Melbourne. Mees unsuccessfully contested the building of a marshalling yard and a new tram "superstop" in front of the main entrance to the University of Melbourne's Parkville campus on Swanston Street, and opposed the building of the proposed Melbourne Metro Rail Project tunnel under the centre of Melbourne, on the grounds that much less expensive options are available to boost capacity on the Melbourne suburban rail network. In the early 2000s he also helped to establish the short-lived Public Transport First Party in Victoria, which campaigned in selected electorates on transport-related issues.

== Debating ==
Throughout the 1980s and 1990s, Mees was an active member of the Australian debating community. He debated in competition from schools level, through university, to adult level. Mees served on the Executive of the Debaters Association of Victoria, adjudicated schools competition, and participated in selection and training of the Victorian Schools Debating Team. As an adult, he represented Victoria at the National Debating Championships, and was a member of the winning team in Hobart in 1992.

== Personal ==
In 1988 Mees married journalist, academic and teacher Erica Cervini.

Mees died in Melbourne on 19 June 2013, aged 52.

== Selected publications ==
- Mees, Paul (1996) Do public choice and public transport mix? An Australian-Canadian comparison, Canberra. A.C.T. : Urban Research Program, Research School of Social Sciences, Australian National University (ISBN 0731525175)
- Mees, Paul (2000) A Very Public Solution: public transport in the dispersed city, Carlton South, Vic: Melbourne University Press (ISBN 0522848672)
- Mees, Paul (2009) Transport for Suburbia: Beyond the Automobile Age, Earthscan (ISBN 9781844077403)

== Further reading and external links ==
- Clay, Lucas (27 April 2008). "Going nowhere fast in car fuel efficiency". The Age. Fairfax Media. Archived from the original on 23 January 2013.
- "Science of traffic", Catalyst, Australian Broadcasting Commission, 21 March 2002, archived from the original on 6 November 2012
- "Getting Public Transport Back on Track", Up Close, University of Melbourne, 2007, archived from the original on 2 March 2011
- "Paying the Toll", Insight, SBS Television, 10 May 2001, archived from the original on 11 September 2007
- Daniel, Zoe (2 March 2001), "Victorian CityLink operator lodges compensation claim", AM, Australian Broadcasting Commission, archived from the original on 4 November 2012
- Moynihan, Stephen; Millar, Royce (18 May 2006). "Transport plan labelled too little too late". The Age. Fairfax Media. Archived from the original on 20 October 2012.
- Paul Mees, Collingwood Action Group, 15 July 2004, archived from the original on 30 October 2013, "Paul Mees assesses Melbourne 2030"
- Does Melbourne need another central city rail tunnel? (PDF), July 2008, archived from the original (PDF) on 28 February 2014
