= WDV =

Economic term

The written-down value (abbreviated as WDV) is the depreciated value of an asset (movable or immovable) for purposes of taxation. WDV is a method of depreciation in which a fixed rate of depreciation is charged on the book value of the asset, over its useful life
