= Genetic variation (disambiguation) =

Genetic variation may refer to

- Genetic diversity
- Genetic variability
- Genetic variance
- Genetic variation
- Genetic variant (disambiguation)
