= Public Transport Users Association =

Australian public transport lobby group

The Public Transport Users Association (PTUA) is a community-based public transport lobby group in Victoria, Australia, based in Melbourne. It is run entirely by volunteers and has no full-time staff.

== History and aims ==
The organisation was founded in 1976 as the Train Travellers Association, and became prominent after the controversial Lonie Report recommended huge freeway expansion and closure of most public passenger transport in the city.

The Association advocates a greater role for public transport and less dependence on the private car. Key PTUA policies include:

- A publicly accountable authority to provide co-ordinated planning and management of train, tram and bus services,
- The favouring of sustainable transport modes over cars, through appropriate urban planning decisions, and taxation and transport project resource allocations,
- Opposition to major road expansion such as the building of new freeways,
- More frequent public transport services, longer operating hours and better connections between modes,
- Expansion of the train, tram, and bus networks,
- More staffing at stations and on trains/trams,
- Fares that ensure public transport is competitive with car travel.

Of particular interest to the Association are potential extensions to Melbourne's metropolitan rail network, particularly lines to Doncaster, Rowville (via Monash University's Clayton Campus) and Melbourne Airport, the revitalisation of the bus network, including more routes being upgraded to SmartBus status, and filling in so-called "tram missing links", by the construction of mostly minor extensions to the tram network that will ensure that routes terminate at nearby railway stations, bus routes and activity centres.

== Achievements ==
The PTUA successfully campaigned for extended New Year's Day public transport hours in 2004, and that has been continued by the state government in subsequent years. They also successfully lobbied for the extension of the 109 tram to Box Hill in Melbourne's east. The association successfully pushed against the contentious idea to prohibit bikes on trains during rush hour in 2008, garnering substantial media attention. The Association maintains a high media profile, publishes a regular newsletter for members, operates an office in Melbourne, and has a branch in Geelong The Ballarat branch is dormant.

The current president is Tony Morton, who succeeded Daniel Bowen in October 2012.
