= List of acts of the Parliament of Australia from 1910 =

This is a list of acts of the Parliament of Australia for the year 1910.

== 1910 ==
Short title, or popular name	Citation	Royal assent
Long title
Supply Act (No. 1) 1910-11 (repealed)	No. 1 of 1910	
Trust Fund Advances Act 1910 (repealed)	No. 2 of 1910	
Constitution Alteration (State Debts) 1909	No. 3 of 1910	6 August 1910
An Act to alter the provisions of the Constitution relating to the Public Debts of the States.
Old-age Pensions Appropriation Act 1910 (repealed)	No. 4 of 1910	
Supply Act (No. 2) 1910-11 (repealed)	No. 5 of 1910	
Naval Loan Repeal Act 1910 (repealed)	No. 6 of 1910	
Commonwealth Conciliation and Arbitration Act 1910 (repealed)	No. 7 of 1910	
Surplus Revenue Act 1910	No. 8 of 1910	2 September 1910
An Act relating to the Financial Relations between the Commonwealth and the several States.
Customs (Inter-State Accounts) Act 1910 (repealed)	No. 9 of 1910	
Immigration Restriction Act 1910 (repealed)	No. 10 of 1910	
Australian Notes Act 1910 (repealed)	No. 11 of 1910	16 September 1910
An Act relating to Australian Notes. (Repealed by Commonwealth Bank Act 1920 (No. 43))
Appropriation (Works and Buildings) Act 1910-11 (repealed)	No. 12 of 1910	
Supply Act (No. 3) 1910-11 (repealed)	No. 13 of 1910	
Bank Notes Tax Act 1910 (repealed)	No. 14 of 1910	10 October 1910
An Act to impose a Tax upon Bank Notes. (Repealed by Commonwealth Bank Act 1945 (No. 13))
Trust Fund Advances Act 1910 (No. 2) (repealed)	No. 15 of 1910	
Sugar Bounty Act 1910 (repealed)	No. 16 of 1910	
Excise (Sugar) Act 1910 (repealed)	No. 17 of 1910	
Naval Appropriation Act 1910 (repealed)	No. 18 of 1910	
Patents Trade Marks and Designs Act 1910 (repealed)	No. 19 of 1910	14 November 1910
An Act relating to the administration of the Patents Act 1903–1909, the Trade Marks Act 1905, (Note: Trade Marks Act 1905 (No. 20)) and the Designs Act 1906. (Note: Designs Act 1906 (No. 4))
Northern Territory Acceptance Act 1910	No. 20 of 1910	16 November 1910
An Act to provide for the Acceptance of the Northern Territory as a Territory under the Authority of the Commonwealth and for the carrying out of the Agreement for the Surrender and Acceptance.
Land Tax Act 1910 (repealed)	No. 21 of 1910	16 November 1910
An Act to impose a Progressive Land Tax upon Unimproved Values. (Repealed by Land Tax Abolition Act 1953 (No. 2))
Land Tax Assessment Act 1910 (repealed)	No. 22 of 1910	17 November 1910
An Act relating to the Imposition, Assessment, and Collection of a Land Tax upon Unimproved Values. (Repealed by Land Tax Abolition Act 1953 (No. 2))
Shale Oils Bounties Act 1910 (repealed)	No. 23 of 1910	
Postal Rates Act 1910 (repealed)	No. 24 of 1910	
Seat of Government (Administration) Act 1910	No. 25 of 1910	25 November 1910
An Act to provide for the Provisional Government of the Territory for the Seat of Government of the Commonwealth.
Emigration Act 1910 (repealed)	No. 26 of 1910	
Northern Territory (Administration) Act 1910 (repealed)	No. 27 of 1910	
Post and Telegraph Act 1910 (repealed)	No. 28 of 1910	
Australian Industries Preservation Act 1910 (repealed)	No. 29 of 1910	
Naval Defence Act 1910 (repealed)	No. 30 of 1910	
Referendum (Constitution Alteration) Act 1910 (repealed)	No. 31 of 1910	
Supplementary Appropriation (Works and Buildings) Act 1908-9 (repealed)	No. 32 of 1910	
Supplementary Appropriation (Works and Buildings) Act 1910-11 (repealed)	No. 33 of 1910	
Judiciary Act 1910 (repealed)	No. 34 of 1910	
Supplementary Appropriation Act 1910-11 (repealed)	No. 35 of 1910	
Customs Act 1910 (repealed)	No. 36 of 1910	
Defence Act 1910 (repealed)	No. 37 of 1910	
Supplementary Appropriation Act 1908-9 (repealed)	No. 38 of 1910	
Customs Tariff 1910 (repealed)	No. 39 of 1910	
Supply Act (No. 1) 1911-12 (repealed)	No. 40 of 1910	
Appropriation Act 1910-11 (repealed)	No. 41 of 1910	1 December 1910
An Act to grant and apply a sum out of the Consolidated Revenue Fund to the service of the year ending the thirtieth day of June One thousand nine hundred and eleven and to appropriate the Supplies granted for such year in this session of the Parliament.

== Sources ==
- "legislation.gov.au".
