= Eric Abraham =

Eric Abraham may refer to:

- Eric Abraham (soldier) (1898–2003), Australian World War I veteran
- Eric Abraham (producer) (born 1954), South African-British film and television producer, and journalist

== See also ==
- Eric Anthony Abrahams (1940–2011), Jamaican public servant and broadcaster
- Erich Abraham (1895–1971), general in the Wehrmacht of Nazi Germany
