= Australian Taxation Office =

Australian revenue collection body

Agency overview
- Formed: 11 November 1910; 115 years ago
- Preceding agencies: Commonwealth Taxation Office; Federal Taxation Office
- Jurisdiction: Australian Government
- Headquarters: 15 Sydney Avenue, Barton, Australian Capital Territory
- Employees: 21,493 (June 2025)
- Annual budget: A$4.5 billion (2024–25)
- Minister responsible: Jim Chalmers, Treasurer
- Deputy Minister responsible: Daniel Mulino, Assistant Treasurer
- Agency executive: Rob Heferen, Commissioner of Taxation and Registrar of the ABR, ABRS, & RFOAA
- Parent department: The Treasury
- Child agencies: Tax Practitioners Board; Australian Charities and Not-for-profits Commission
- Key document: Land Tax Act 1910
- Website: ato.gov.au

The Australian Taxation Office (ATO) is an Australian statutory agency and the principal revenue collection body for the Australian Government. The ATO has responsibility for administering the Australian federal taxation system, superannuation legislation, and associated matters. Responsibility for the operations of the ATO lies within the portfolio of the Federal Treasurer and the Department of the Treasury.

As the Australian government's principal revenue collection body, the ATO collects income tax, goods and services tax (GST) and other federal taxes. The ATO also has responsibility for managing the Australian Business Register, delivering the Higher Education Loan Program, delivering many Australian government payments and administering key components of Australia's superannuation system.

== History ==
During the colonial period of the 1800s, a number of landholders had secured large tracts of arable land in Australia. After the states federated in 1901 to form the Commonwealth of Australia, the Commonwealth's main source of revenue was derived from indirect customs and the excise on duties on locally manufactured and imported goods. The Labor Andrew Fisher government was elected at the 1910 federal election and was concerned about large swathes of the country being under-utilised. The government introduced the first federal tax laws – the Bank Notes Tax Act 1910, the Land Tax Act 1910 and the Land Tax Assessment Act 1910 – to break up the large estates.

George McKay was appointed the first Commissioner of Land Taxation on 11 November 1910. The first tax return forms were issued on 10 January 1911 so that landholders could be assessed for their land tax liabilities. The tax was not popular, but a High Court of Australia challenge to the land tax found the law to be constitutional. The associated land valuations were contentious with more than 1,800 appeals and objections received by the middle of 1913.

In his first year, commissioner McKay had underneath him 105 tax officers, assessed approximately 15,000 land tax returns and collected £1.3 million to £1.4 million. Over the next decade, the government introduced several new taxes, mainly to cope with the massive cost of Australia's collecting revenue to fund participation in World War I. By the end of the decade, the department employed 1,565 people and collected approximately £10.45 million in taxes.

The ATO was the first Australian Government agency to introduce a virtual assistant using artificial intelligence on its website (see Artificial intelligence in government).

== Commissioner ==
Rob Heferen was appointed Commissioner of Taxation and Registrar of the Australian Business Register on 1 March 2024.

The Australian Taxation Office has been headed by thirteen Commissioners of Taxation:

- George McKay – 1910–16
- Robert Ewing – 1917–39
- Lawrence Jackson – 1939–46
- Patrick McGovern – 1946–61
- John O'Sullivan – 1961–63
- Daniel Canavan – 1963–64
- Edward Cain – 1964–76
- William (Bill) O'Reilly – 1976–84
- Trevor Boucher – 1984–93
- Michael Carmody – 1993–2005
- Michael D'Ascenzo – 2005–12
- Chris Jordan – 2013–24
- Rob Heferen – 2024–present

== Organisational structure ==
The Commissioner of Taxation is responsible for the general administration of the tax system and the ATO. The Commissioner of Taxation and three Second Commissioners of Taxation are each appointed for a term of seven years. The Commissioner and Second Commissioners are eligible for re-appointment after each term.

The overall strategic direction of the organisation is set by the ATO Executive Committee, which is composed of the Commissioner, three Second Commissioners, Chief Operating Officer, Chief Security Officer, and Chief Finance Officer. These roles are currently held by:

- Rob Heferen, Commissioner of Taxation; Registrar of the Australian Business Register, Australian Business Registry Services, and Register of Foreign Ownership of Australian Assets
- Jeremy Hirschhorn, Second Commissioner
- Kirsten Fish, Second Commissioner
- David Allen, Second Commissioner
- Mark Sawade, Chief Information Officer and Chief Security Officer
- Brad Chapman, Chief Operating Officer (acting)
- Janine Bristow, Chief Finance Officer

The ATO's operations are managed through five groups which are led by members of the executive. These groups are:

- Compliance & Engagement Group (CEG; pronounced /kɛg/), led by Second Commissioner Jeremy Hirschhorn.
- Law Design and Practice (LDP), led by Second Commissioner Kirsten Fish.
- Enterprise Solutions and Technology (EST), led by Chief Information Officer and Chief Security Officer Mark Sawade.
- Enterprise Strategy and Corporate Operations (ESCO), led by Acting Chief Operating Officer Brad Chapman.
- Frontline Operations (FO), led by Second Commissioner David Allen.

Groups are further divided into business and service lines (BSLs) which are responsible for the delivery of group priorities. As at 3 August 2026, these are:

CEG BSLs
Private Wealth – Client Experience
(PW CX)
Private Wealth – Behaviours of Concern
(PW BoC)
Individuals and Intermediaries
(IAI / I&I)
Fraud and Criminal Behaviours
(FCB)
Public Groups – Programs and Strategies
(PG PS)
Public Groups – Engagement
(PG ENG)
International, Support and Programs
(ISP)
Small Business
(SMB / SB)
Smarter Data Program
(SDP)
Superannuation and Employer Obligations
(SEO)
Payday Super Program
(SEO PDSI)
LDP Group BSLs
Policy, Analysis and Legislation
(PAL)
Objections and Review
(OAR)
Litigation and Legal Services
(LLS)
Office of the Chief Tax Counsel
(OCTC)
EST Group BSLs
Strategy and Architecture
(SA)
User and Technology Services
(UTS)
Digital Delivery
(DD)
Super, Tax, Analytics & Registration Systems
(STARS)
Cyber Security and Service Management
(CSSM)
ESCO Group BSLs

ATO People
(ATOP)
ATO Finance
(ATOF)
Enterprise Strategy and Design
(ESD)
ATO Corporate
(ATOC)
Integrity, Assurance & Law / Office of General Counsel
(IAAL / OGC)
Enterprise Risk, Change, Integration & Evaluation
(ERCIE)

FO Group BSLs

Frontline Risk and Strategy
(FRS)
Frontline Services
(FS)
Frontline Compliance
(FC)
Frontline Business Improvement
(FBI)
Frontline Resource Management
(FRM)

Certain leaders of BSLs within groups are appointed (either in addition to, or in lieu of, a Deputy Commissioner role) to other statutory offices including that of Chief Data Officer, Chief Technology Officer, Chief Digital Officer, Chief Information Security Officer, Chief Tax Counsel, and Deputy Chief Tax Counsels.

Several BSLs exist separately to the ATO's operational group arrangement. They are as follows:
Independent Internal Functions

- Internal Audit (led by the Chief Internal Auditor)
- Fraud Prevention and Internal Investigations (led by an Assistant Commissioner)

Independent agencies managed as a BSL

- Tax Practitioners Board (TPB)
- Australian Charities and Not-for-profits Commission (ACNC)

Miscellaneous

- ATO Executive (ATOE)

External governance
The ATO employs certain staff, based at the Tax Ombudsman though retaining ATO systems access, to facilitate external scrutiny of the ATO based on Ombudsman priorities.

== Performance ==
The Commissioner of Taxation is required to prepare and release an annual report each financial year. The annual report outlines the ATO's performance and achievements for each financial year.

ATO Net Tax Collections ($m) (2008–09 to 2024–25)
Financial Year	2008–09	2009–10	2010–11	2011–12	2012–13	2013–14	2014–15	2015–16	2016–17	2017–18	2018–19	2019–20	2020–21	2021–22	2022–23	2023–24	2024–25
Net tax collections ($m)	264,493	253,138	272,889	300,953	311,803	321,650	336,830	343,355	359,381	396,749	425,980	404,745	452,797	515,692	576,139	610,559	636,256
Ref.																	

== Legislation ==
The scope of the ATO falls under various acts of legislations, including:

- Income Tax Assessment Act 1936
- Taxation Administration Act 1953
- Income Tax Assessment Act 1997

== Controversies ==
=== Whistleblower ===
In 2017, Richard Boyle, an employee of the ATO based in Adelaide, South Australia, raised internal concerns about debt-collection practices in its Adelaide office. Boyle alleged that there was a culture within the ATO to increase the use of garnishee notices, a measure that allows the ATO to access funds in the bank accounts of taxpayers. After his concerns were dismissed, he aired the allegations on the ABC's Four Corners program in April 2018. The program revealed an email from a team leader that wrote "the last hour of power is upon us … that means you still have time to issue another five garnishees … right?".

Shortly before the Four Corners episode had aired, Boyle's house was raided by the Australian Federal Police who seized personal belongings, including his phone. He was charged with 66 offences, including using a listening device to monitor a private conversation, recording another person's tax file number and disclosing protected information. His case was the first test of the Public Interest Disclosure Act 2013. In July 2020, the Commonwealth reduced his charges down to 24 offences.

Boyle received support from journalists and politicians, including Rex Patrick, Jacqui Lambie, and David Pocock. Pocock and Lambie tabled the Whistleblower Protection Authority bill in parliament, aimed at protecting whistleblowers with legitimate concerns. On 28 August 2025, he was sentenced by Judge Liesl Kudelka in the District Court of South Australia, after he pleaded guilty to four criminal charges. No conviction was recorded, and he was sentenced to only a A$500 fine and a 12-month good behaviour bond.

Following the Four Corners episode, a review was conducted by the Inspector-General of Taxation, Ali Noroozi. In 2019, following the review, the ATO concluded that Boyle's claim was not widespread practice in its Adelaide office; however, there were incidents that highlighted the need for better staff training. Furthermore, it noted that the email sent from the team leader was only sent to 12 staff members and that "the message was intended ironically, and not literally". The ATO accepted all of the inspector-general's recommendations regarding internal communication, training procedures and contingency planning.

== See also ==
- Business activity statement
- List of Australian government entities
- Tax file number
- TaxPack
