= World War I memorials in Queensland =

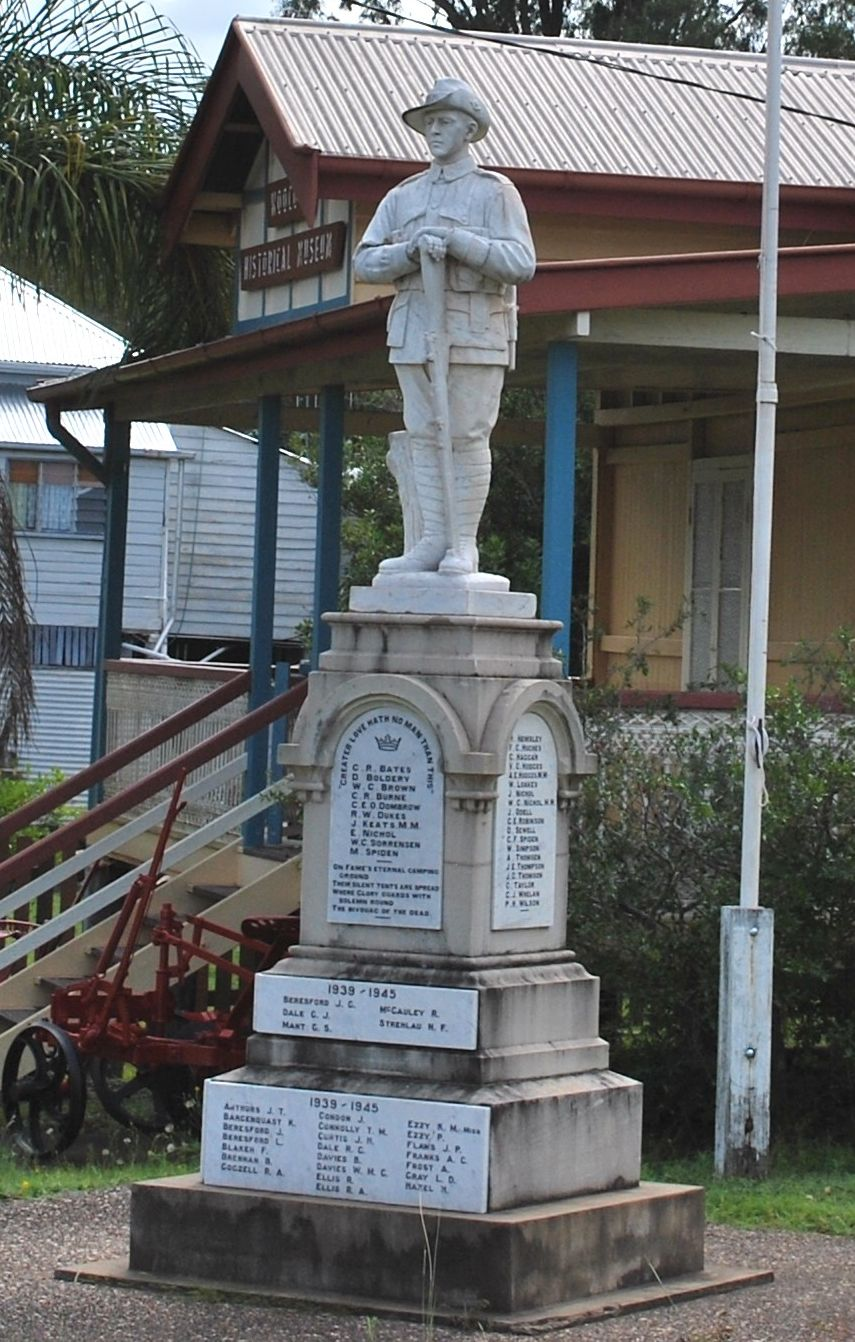
World War I "digger" memorial at Brooweena, 2008

War memorials were erected in many towns of Queensland, Australia, in commemoration of the service and death of many Queenslanders in World War I.

== History ==
Queensland had few civic monuments before the First World War. The memorials erected in its wake became some of the most significant monuments, recording the devastating impact of the war on a young Queensland. Over 58,000 Queenslanders served in World War I and over 10,000 of them died. No previous or subsequent war has had such an impact on Queensland.

Even before the end of the war, memorials became a spontaneous and highly visible expression of national grief. To those who erected them, they were as sacred as grave sites, substitute graves for the Australians whose bodies lay in battlefield cemeteries in Europe and the Middle East. British policy decreed that the Empire war dead were to be buried where they fell. The word "cenotaph", commonly applied to war memorials at the time, literally means "empty tomb".

Australian war memorials are distinctive in that often they commemorate not only the dead but all who served. Australians were proud that their first great national army, unlike other belligerent armies, was composed entirely of volunteers, men worthy of honour whether or not they made the supreme sacrifice. Many memorials honour all who served from a locality, not just the dead, providing valuable evidence of community involvement in the war. Such evidence is not readily obtainable from military records, or from state or national listings, where names are categorised alphabetically or by military unit.

War memorials are also valuable evidence of imperial and national loyalties, at the time, not seen as conflicting. They also demonstrate the skills of local stonemasons, metalworkers and architects, and provide insights into popular taste.

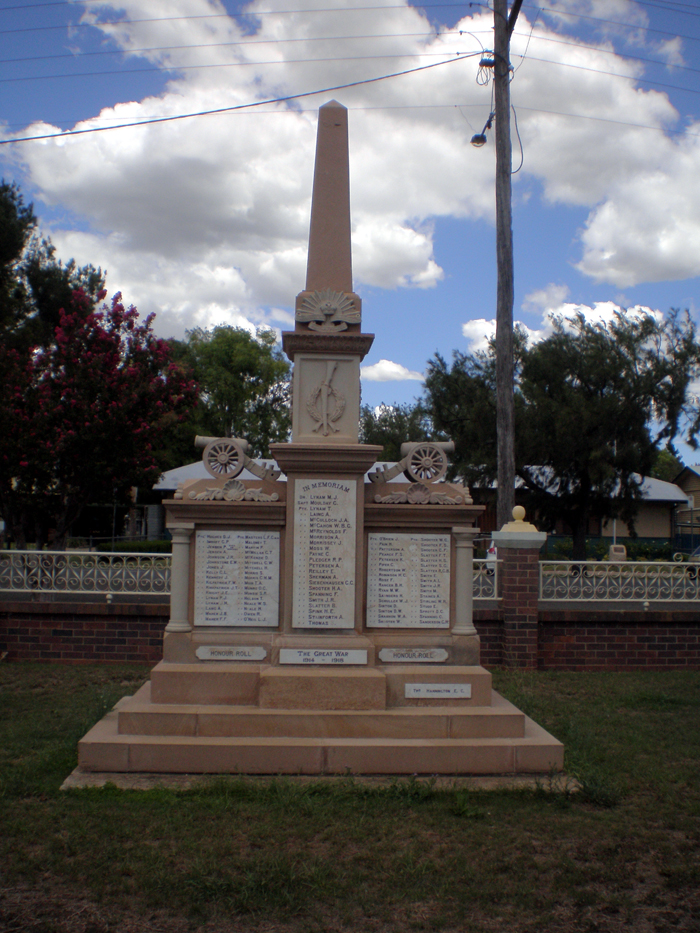
Obelisk style war memorial at Allora, Queensland

Although there are many different types of memorials in Queensland, the digger (soldier) statue is the most common. It was the most popular choice of communities responsible for erecting the memorials, embodying the ANZAC Spirit and representing the qualities of the ideal Australian: loyalty, courage, youth, innocence and masculinity. The digger was a phenomenon peculiar to Queensland, perhaps due to the fact that other states had followed Britain's lead and established Advisory Boards made up of architects and artists, prior to the erection of war memorials. The digger statue was not highly regarded by artists and architects who were involved in the design of relatively few Queensland memorials. In southern states, the obelisk style of war memorial predominates.

The early war memorials were often placed in cemeteries, often being erected to commemorate the death of individual soldiers, e.g. Queensland's first World War I memorial was the Victor Denton War Memorial erected in 1915 in the cemetery at Nobby. However, as the casualties mounted, grief was no longer limited to the close circles of family and friends but to whole communities, resulting in memorials placed in prominent public places in the town, often as part of larger commemorative schemes, such as memorial parks and memorial halls.

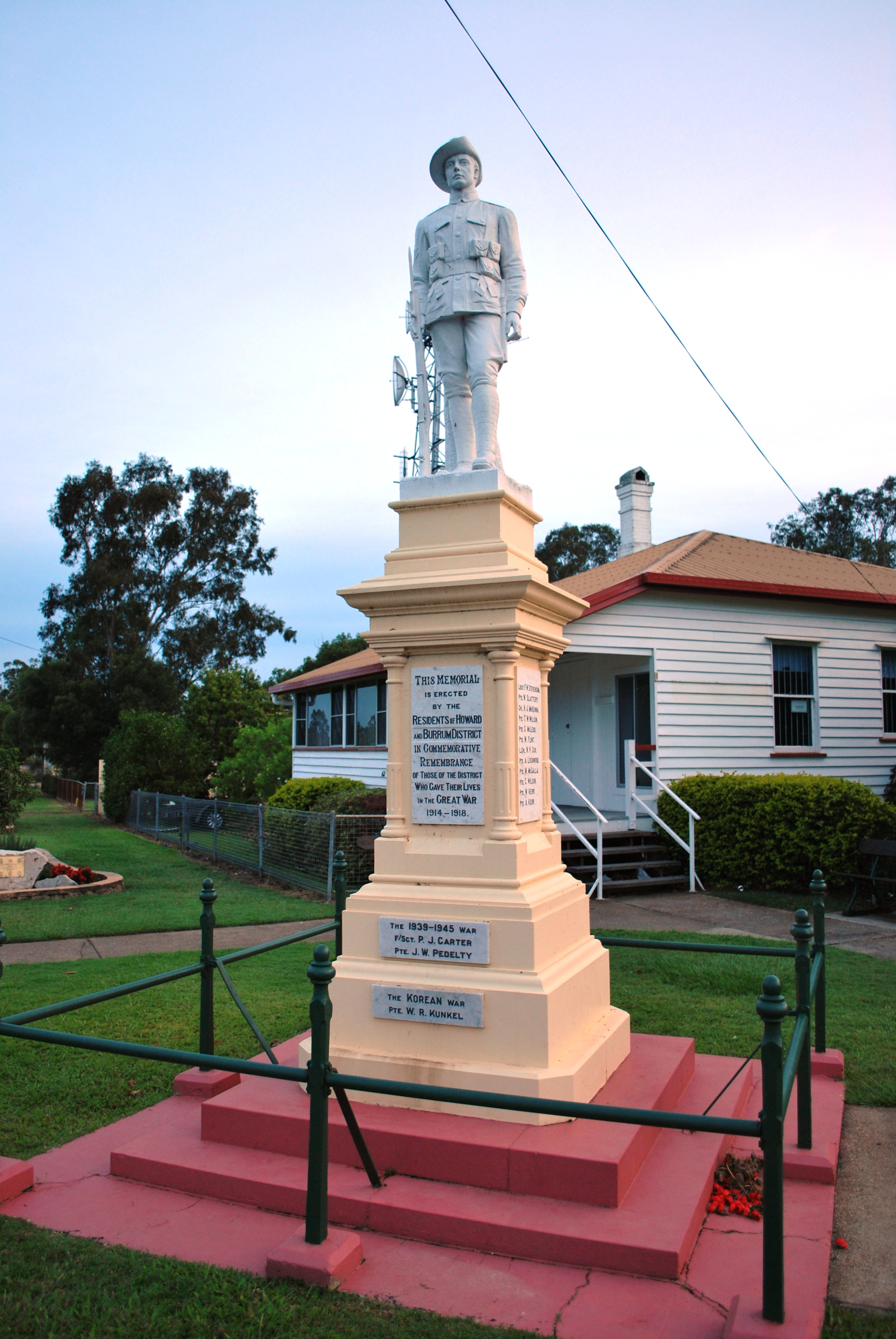
Howard War Memorial with the Italian Alpino statue

Most statues were constructed by local masonry firms, although some were by artists or imported. The statue for the Howard War Memorial was imported from Italy and is unique because the "digger" depicted is not an Australian soldier. Careful inspection reveals the statue has a full Italian Alpino uniform and accoutrements, including badges.

Many of the First World War monuments have been updated to record local involvement in later conflicts, and some have fallen victim to unsympathetic re-location and repair.

== See also ==
- Category: World War I memorials in Queensland
