= TaxPack =

TaxPack is a booklet issued by the Australian Taxation Office to assist individuals complete their income tax return.

It comes in a different edition for each year entitled for example TaxPack 2007. An associated booklet is the TaxPack supplement with extra tax items not needed by 80% of taxpayers. Another version is called TaxPack for retirees.

It can take 8½ hours to read through the tax pack and complete the forms.

4,800,000 copies of taxPack 2000 were produced along with 1,300,000 copies of the supplement. In 1998, 5,800,000 copies were printed. It had 124 pages with the 1997 edition having 140 pages. The 60 page supplement was split off in 1998 to reduce the size of TaxPack. Although TaxPack is still being produced, it was being replaced by a PC software package called E-tax but has since been migrated to the online platform myGov.

== See also ==
- Taxation in Australia
