= March of the Dungarees =

1915 snowball march in Australia

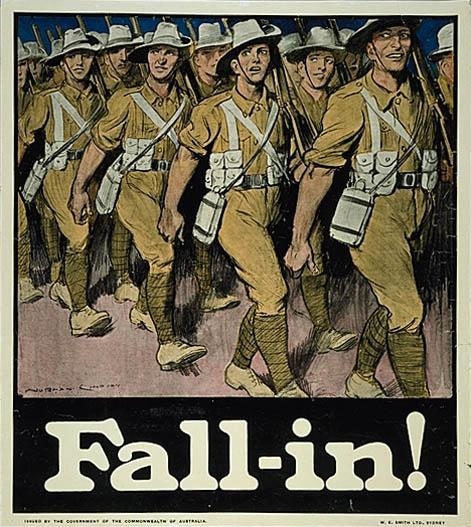
Australian recruiting poster "Fall-in!" by Norman Lindsay

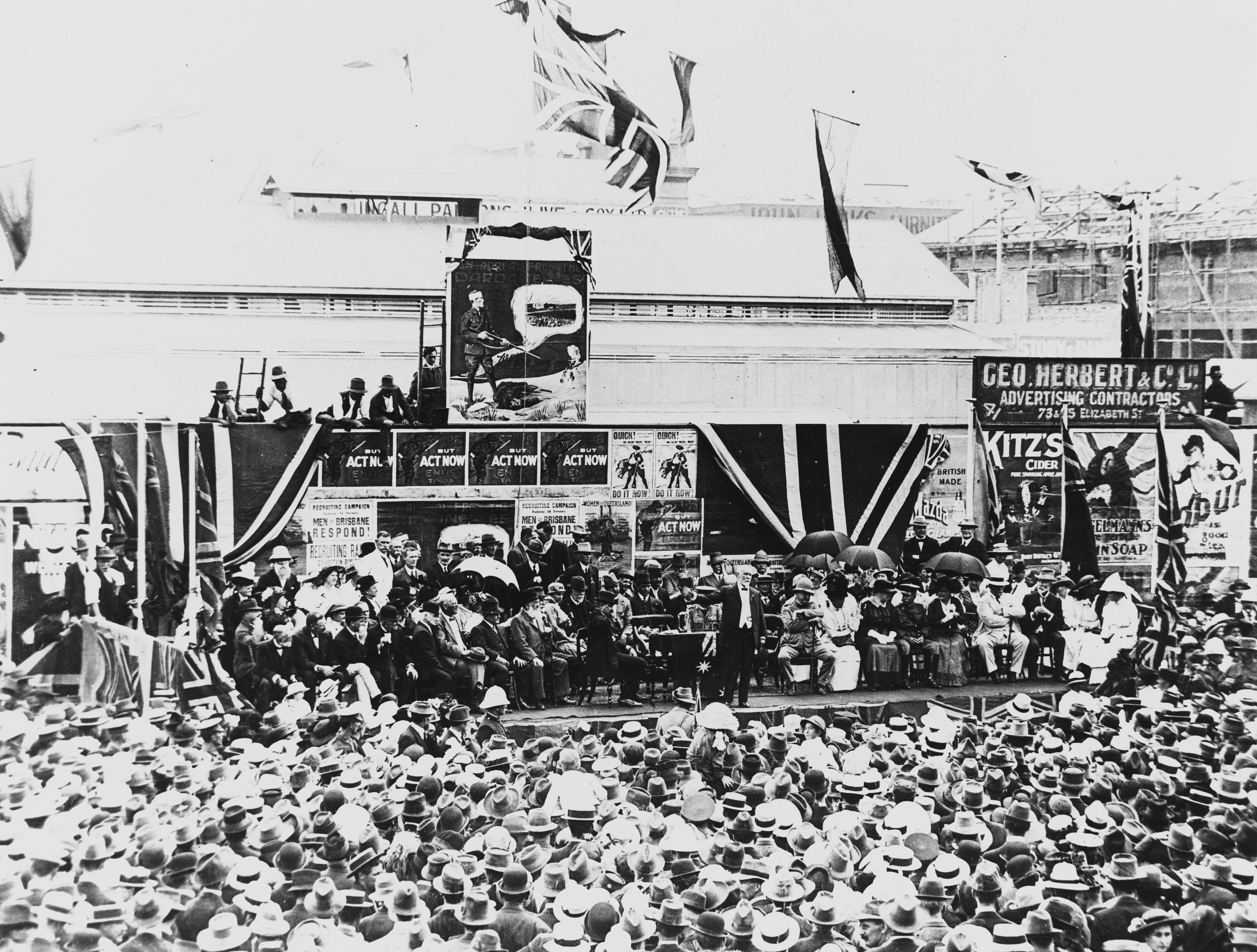
Dungarees recruiting campaign, November 1915

The March of the Dungarees was a snowball march in November 1915 in South-East Queensland, Australia, to recruit men into the Australian military during World War I at a time when enthusiasm to enlist had waned after the loss of life in the Gallipoli campaign. The march began at Warwick with 28 men and followed the Southern railway line through Toowoomba, Laidley, and Ipswich to its destination in Brisbane, gathering 125 recruits along the way.

== Background ==
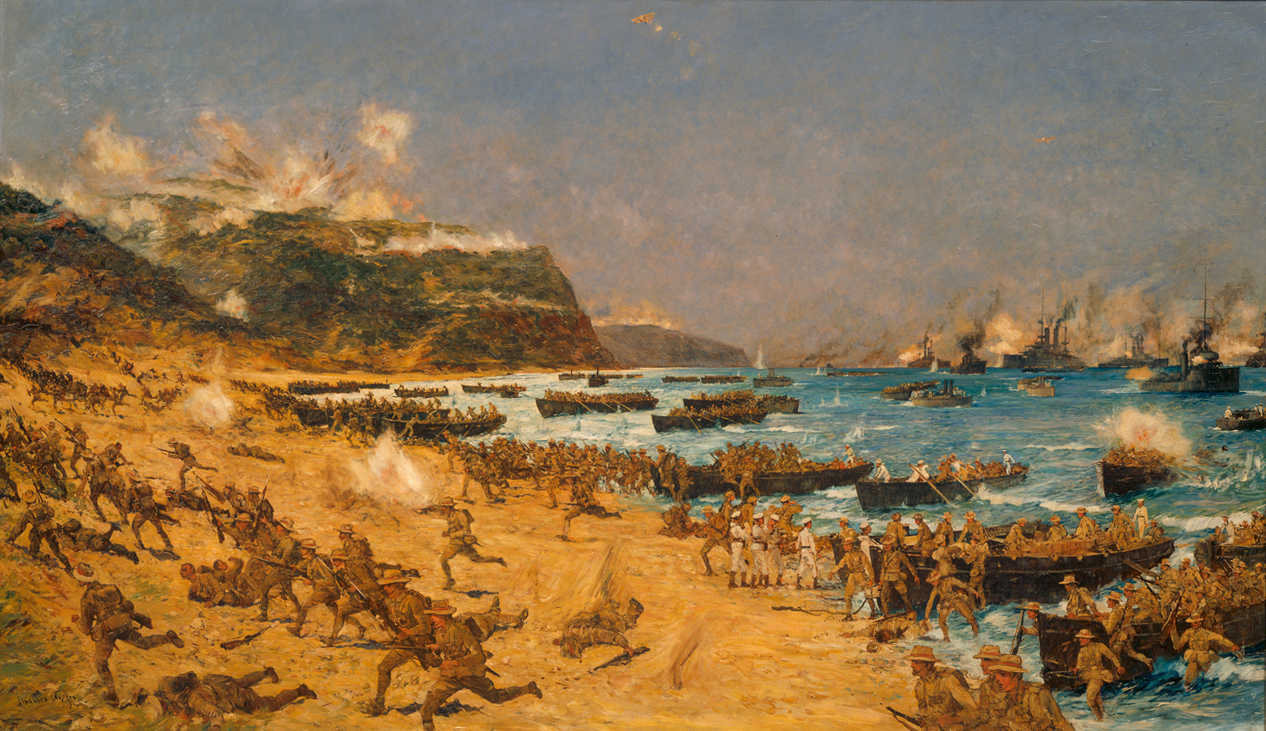
Landing at Gallipoli, April 1915

Following Britain's declaration of war on Germany on 4 August 1914, Australia and the other members of the British Empire were also at war. The first Australian to perish on the Western Front was Lieutenant William Malcolm Chisholm of the Lancashire Regiment, who died in the Battle of Le Cateau in France on 26 August 1914. Closer to home, Australian troops secured German New Guinea and the Bismarck Archipelago in September–October 1914. Australians landed on the Gallipoli Peninsula in Turkey on 25 April 1915. By October 1915, Australia had lost 7,279 men in the Gallipoli Campaign and thousands more were wounded. More recruits were needed.

On 5 November 1915, the Queensland Recruiting Committee held a public meeting in the Exhibition Hall in Brisbane to initiate a snowball recruitment march. Snowball Marches—named for their ability to gather up men along the way—began with the 'Cooees' march from Gilgandra to Sydney in October 1915. The March of the Dungarees was the second snowball march, travelling from Warwick to Brisbane. Another Queensland snowball march was the Cane Beetles March from Mooliba to Cairns for Anzac Day in April 1916.

== Stanthorpe: 6–10 November 1915 ==
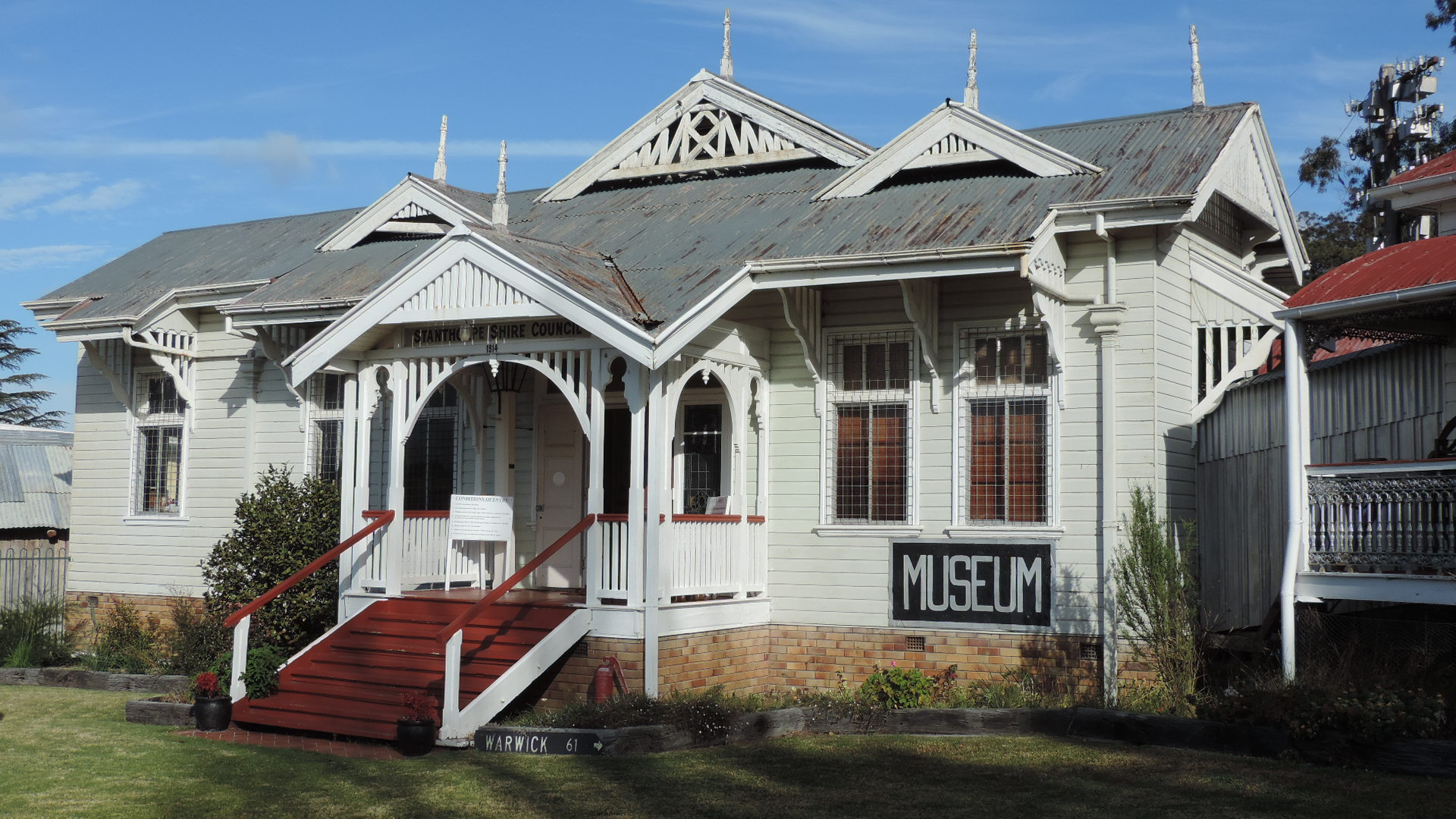
Stanthorpe Shire Hall (now museum), 2015

Stanthorpe was proposed as the starting point for the recruitment march in the initial planning stages. Public meetings were held throughout the district calling for support from communities in providing meals and accommodation, as well as setting up meetings in each town on the planned route. The first public meeting in the Warwick district was held in Pratten, about 30 kilometres (19 mi) to the north-west on 6 November 1915. A similar meeting was held in Toowoomba.

Stanthorpe held a recruiting meeting at the Shire Hall on 10 November. Lieutenant David Binnie—who was in charge of the march—indicated his desire to commence at Stanthorpe, but it was later decided to start at Warwick. Eight Stanthorpe men volunteered to join up, taking the train to Warwick in time for the commencement of the march, with a ninth man catching up the following day.

At the same time, recruiting meetings were held in nearby townships including Allora, Sandy Creek, Maryvale, Yangan, Tannymorel and Killarney. These men either made their way to Warwick or joined the march at other towns along the route. All of the recruits' belongings were taken by train which is why the route follows the Southern railway line to Toowoomba and down to Brisbane.

Recruits:

- Lieutenant David Johnstone Binnie - Commanding Officer
- from Stanthorpe: 8 (including Charles William Day, who previously served Gallipoli and Egypt and thought to have supplied the flag from Gallipoli that the Stanthorpe men carried)
- from Killarney: 1
- from Maryvale: 1 (later discharged as medically unfit)
- from Yangan: 5, plus 1 nominated but not enlisted

== Warwick: 15–16 November 1915 ==
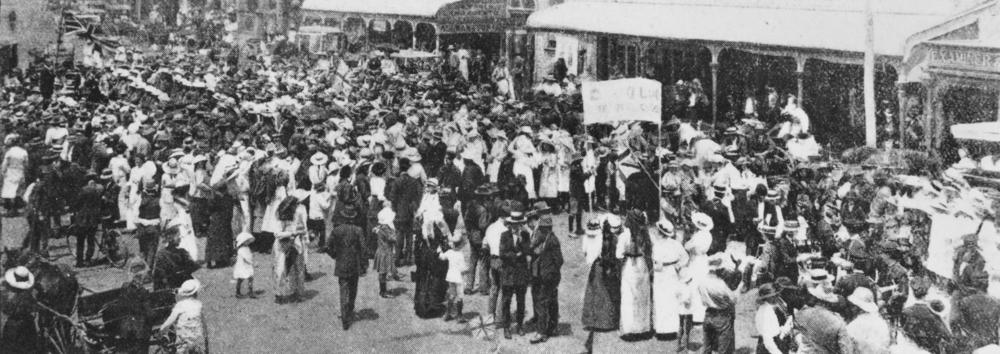
Crowd gathers at the start of the Dungarees March in Warwick, 1915.

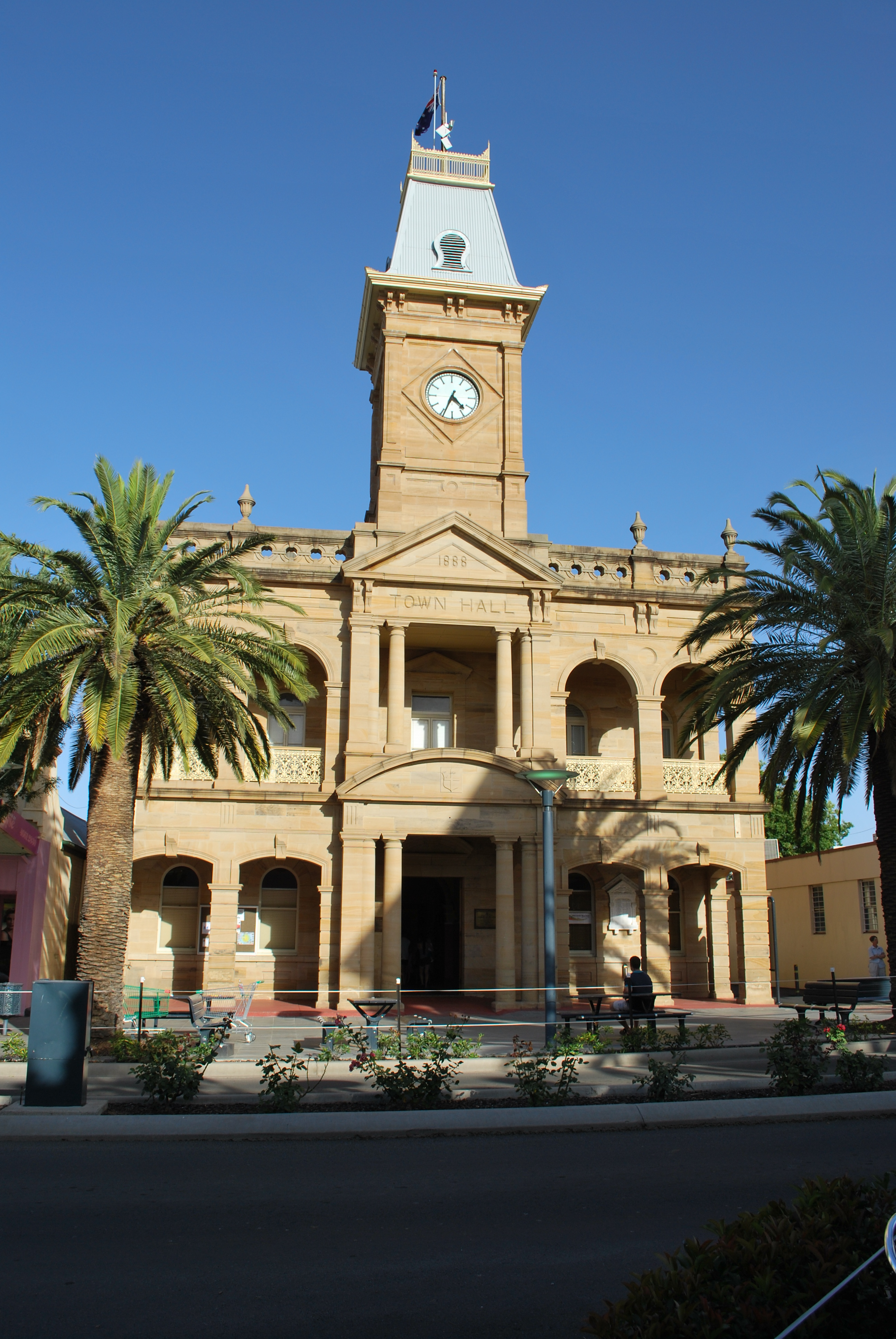
Warwick Town Hall, 2008

The town of Warwick in the southern Darling Downs was the starting point of the recruitment march of the Dungarees. Crowds assembled outside the Warwick Town Hall in Palmerin Street at 10.30am on the morning of 16 November 1915 to farewell the men. The previous evening, 28 recruits from Stanthorpe and Warwick districts were sworn-in, and further men were expected to join.

Warwick town centre was gaily decorated and businesses closed for an hour to ensure a large gathering. A guard of honour was formed by the local school children waving flags. Commanding Officer, Lieutenant David Binnie, and the Warwick contingent led the march under a new Union Jack presented by the Mayor of Warwick while the Stanthorpe boys held a tattered and battle-stained Australian flag. It had been the first flag hoisted by the 9th battalion at Gallipoli on 25 April 1915.

The men wore dark dungaree (blue denim-like material) uniforms with white linen hats and were supplied with badges indicating their initial acceptance following a medical examination into the recruitment process. This outfit of clothes was used as fatigues (clothes for non-combat manual work) by Australian soldiers since at least the Boer War.

The public spectacle of the march out of Warwick continued over the Helene Street Bridge, along the Condamine River bank, (where sporting fields are today), under the railway, and headed along Glengallan Road.

The Dungarees marched out of Warwick on the morning of 16 November 1915, pausing to take the salute on the Helene Street Bridge along the Condamine River bank, (where sporting fields are today), under the railway, and headed along Glengallan Road.

At Mr Margett's residence, opposite the intersection with Womina–Willowvale Road, the troops were taken by local cars for the 12 kilometres (7.5 mi) run to Glengallan Homestead in time for lunch, which was provided by the Warwick Recruiting Committee.

Recruits: 13, plus 3 nominated but not listed

== Allora: 16–17 November 1915 ==
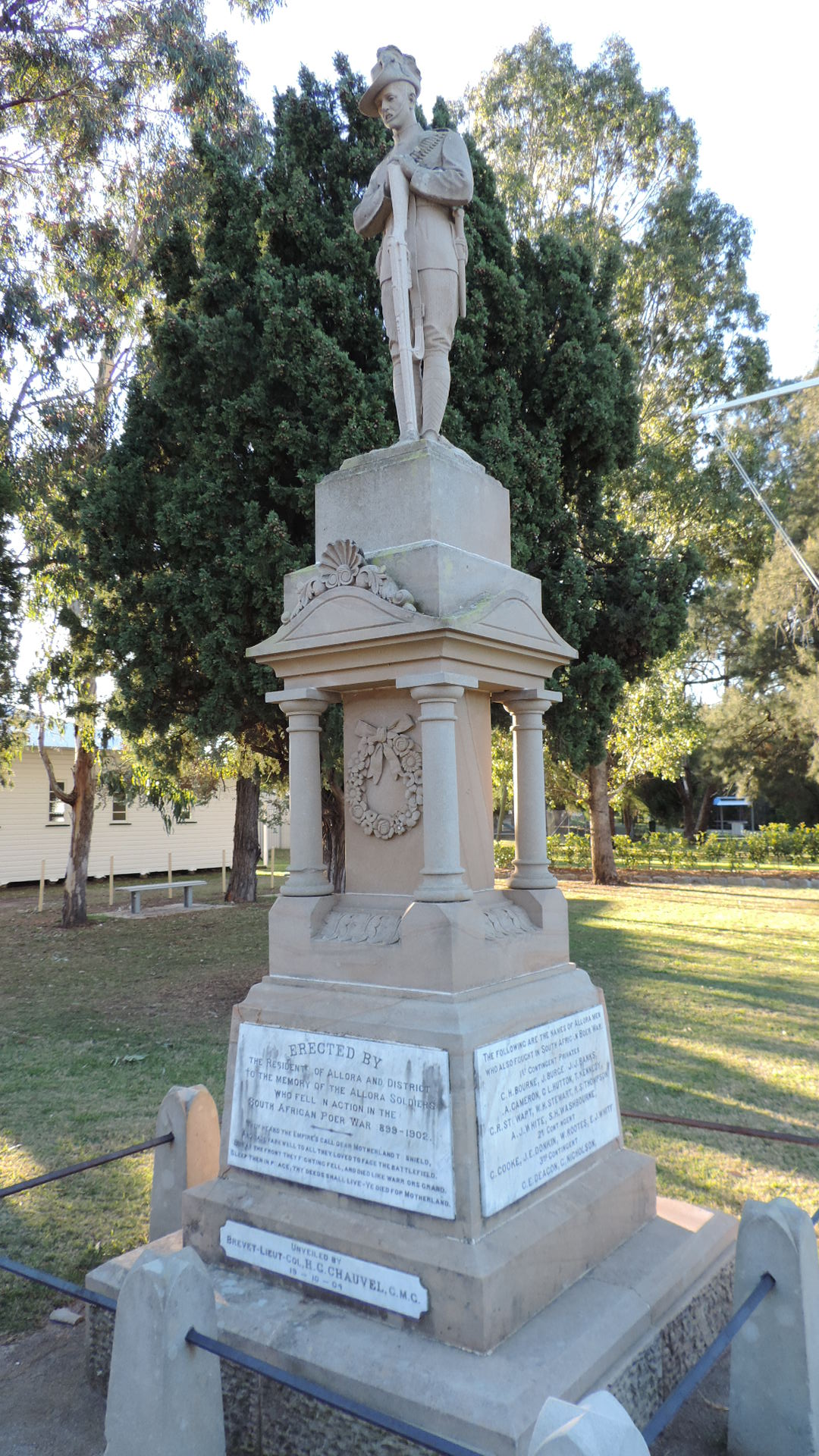
Boer War Memorial, Allora, 2015

The Dungarees set out from Glengallan in the early afternoon of 16 November 1915 for the 16 kilometre march to Allora. They stopped at Mount Marshall for afternoon tea, before heading into Allora for the night. The shops were decorated with bunting, the school bell rang out, and the town band accompanied them into town. They stopped to pay their respects at the Boer War Memorial where the Allora Mayor, Cr T Muir, made a speech. The memorial had been unveiled in 1904 by Colonel (later Sir) Harry Chauvel, honouring the four local men who died, and 35 others who served in the southern African conflict. The men were supplied with a hot dinner at Weatherley's Café.

Allora was the centre of a major wheat-growing district at the time and the men camped in the grain shed at the flour mill in Warwick Street (the flour mill no longer exists). At the recruitment evening in the Protestant Hall, one long-term resident, Mr Brandon, indicated there would likely be many more recruits after Christmas. The wheat harvest was a priority, followed by the maize planting, and young men needed to complete this important work before joining up.

Recruits: 3 (but 1 later discharged on medical grounds)

== Clifton: 17–18 November 1915 ==
The men were up early on the morning of 17 November 1915 for breakfast at Weatherley's Café in Allora. The local ladies presented the recruits with some "necessities of life" including tobacco, pipes, cigarettes, matches, shaving soap and razor strops. The march from Allora travelled north through Spring Creek where the men were given lunch by the Red Cross Society at "Ellerton", the property of Mr Fred Easton. The children from the Spring Creek School sang the national anthem, "God Save the King".

On the approach to Clifton they were joined by decorated motor cars and vehicles of all description. They set up camp in the showgrounds where they were able to take a shower but another cooling option was a short drive to Kings Creek for a swim. In the evening, a recruitment rally was held in the School of Arts Hall. The men were entertained by the local children's choir and six recruits were sworn in.

At that time, Clifton had a cottage hospital which had been established by local nurse, Sister Elizabeth Kenny. She had enlisted in May 1915, and was nursing on troopships returning wounded soldiers to Australia. Sister Kenny was to later achieve fame through her therapeutic methods of dealing with polio sufferers.

Recruits: 4, plus 2 nominated but not enlisted

== Nobby: 18 November 1915 ==
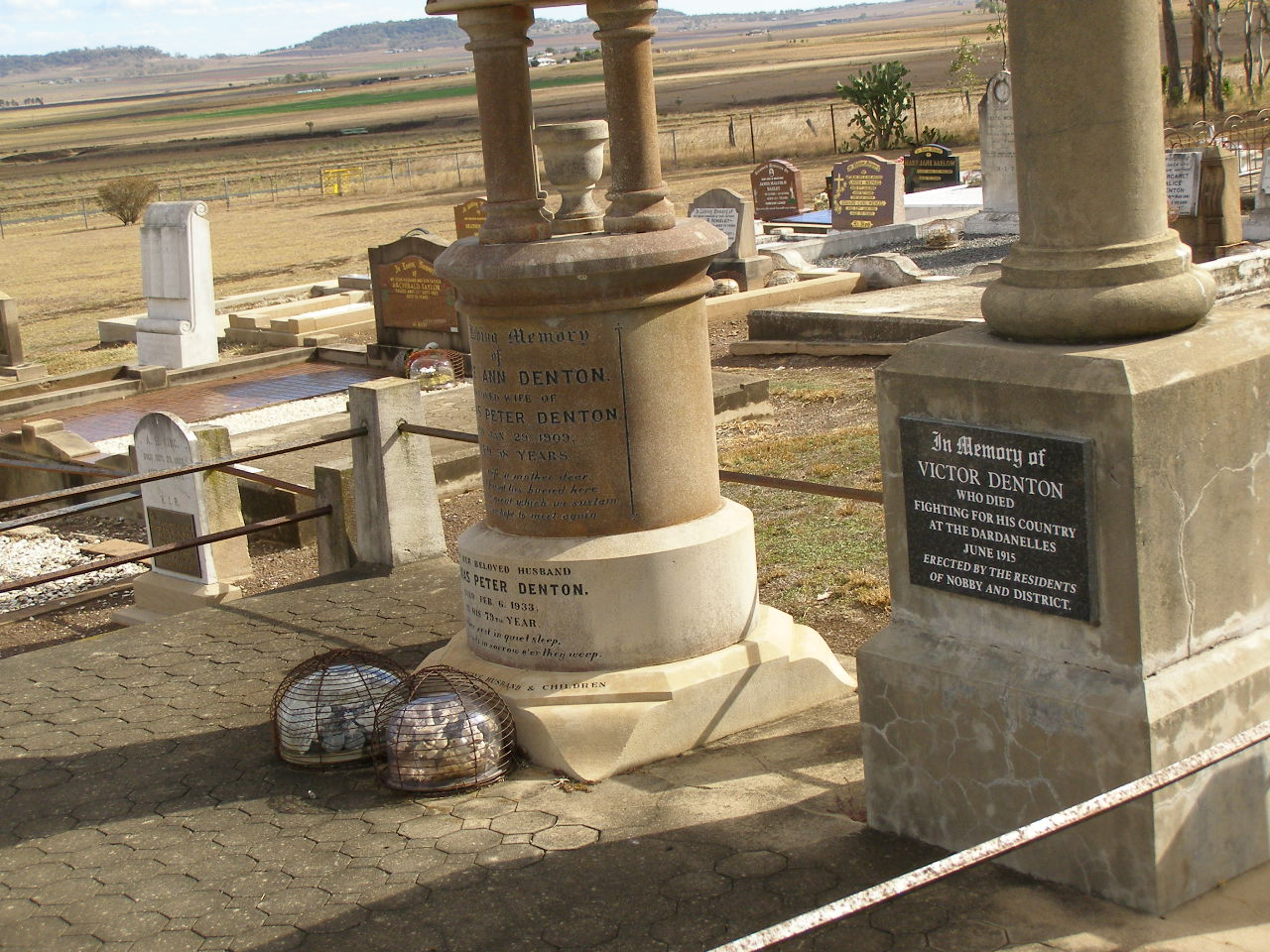
Victor Denton War Memorial in Nobby Cemetery, 2007

On the morning of 18 November 1915, the men assembled at Clifton Post Office and then marched to the Queensland National Bank, where the manager, on behalf of the Red Cross Society, presented the men with cigarettes, handkerchiefs and other useful items.

They continued on to the Nobby cemetery where they unveiled the Victor Denton War Memorial, a memorial to local 20-year-old soldier Private Victor Denton who was killed in June 1915 in the Gallipoli Campaign. The concrete and stone memorial comprises a broken column which symbolises a life cut short. The Last Post was played and the hymn "Nearer, My God to Thee" was sung. This was the first monument to an individual soldier to be erected in Queensland.

The men were welcomed by the Nobby community with a banquet lunch at the School of Arts Hall.

Meanwhile, in Toowoomba, rehearsals were being held with the massed bands which were to join the march into town on 20 November 1915.

== Greenmount: 18–19 November 1915 ==
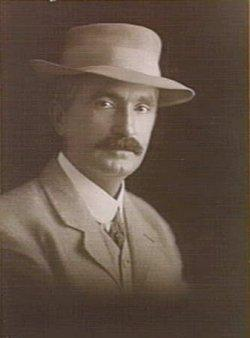
Arthur Hoey David (pen name Steele Rudd), 1910

The Dungarees marched from Nobby to Greenmount on the afternoon of 18 November 1915, arriving late afternoon, and camping at the School of Arts. A hot dinner was provided for them in the hall, prior to a recruitment meeting and a concert.

They were welcomed by Arthur Hoey Davis, the Chairman of the Cambooya Shire Council and the local recruitment committee, but better known by his pen-name Steele Rudd, who grew up in Greenmount, when it was known as Emu Creek. His son, Gower, enlisted in the 2nd Light Horse in March 1915. When Steele Rudd's play "Duncan McLure" was first performed in Toowoomba, Lieutenant Binnie (Commanding Officer of the Dungarees) had the lead role. All of the proceeds were donated to the Wounded Soldier's Fund.

Recruits: 5

== Cambooya: 19–20 November 1915 ==
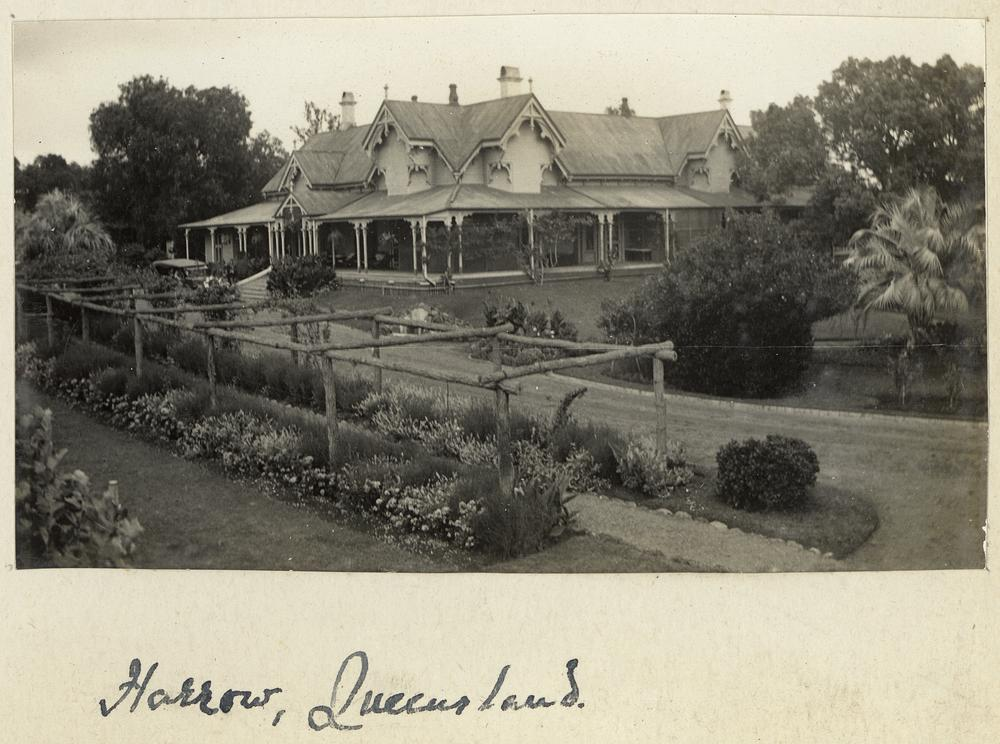
Harrow homestead outside Toowoomba, 1931

The men marched from Greenmount to Cambooya in time for lunch on 19 November 1915. Here they were met by a parade of vehicles, people on horseback and school children from Cambooya, Ramsay and Harrow. A swim in the creek cooled them off, and a sports afternoon was held to lift the spirits of the men. Further country hospitality was provided including an evening meal from the Cambooya Shire Council. A recruitment meeting in the Masonic Hall was accompanied by a concert and supper. The men camped at the hall overnight.

The State Commandant Colonel George Leonard Lee stayed with the Ramsay family at Harrow Homestead (now a garden estate, only open to the public during the Carnival of Flowers and for the Open Garden Scheme).

Recruits: 1

== Drayton: 20 November 1915 ==
On the morning of 20 November 1915, the Dungarees marched from Cambooya and to Wyreema Hall for breakfast around 8am. Colonel Lee arrived with Mr and Mrs Ramsay from Harrow and joined the men for breakfast and some more rousing speeches before the Dungarees were on their way again. As they marched through Westbrook, the boys of the reformatory school lined up to cheer them on. Then it was on to the Drayton Shire Hall for lunch, provided by the Drayton Shire Council.

== Harristown: 20 November 1915 ==
After lunch at Drayton on 20 November 1915, the Dungarees were joined by the Toowoomba Civic Guard and about 50 volunteers from the Toowoomba district who were on leave from Enoggera Barracks. They moved on towards Harristown.

The group arrived just in time for the official opening of the Harristown All Nations Fair at the Harristown Hall. Three recruits volunteered here at the fete, the first from Warra and the others from West Street Toowoomba, where the group was about to proceed.

Recruits:

- from Warra: 1
- from Toowoomba: 2

== Toowoomba: 20–22 November 1915 ==
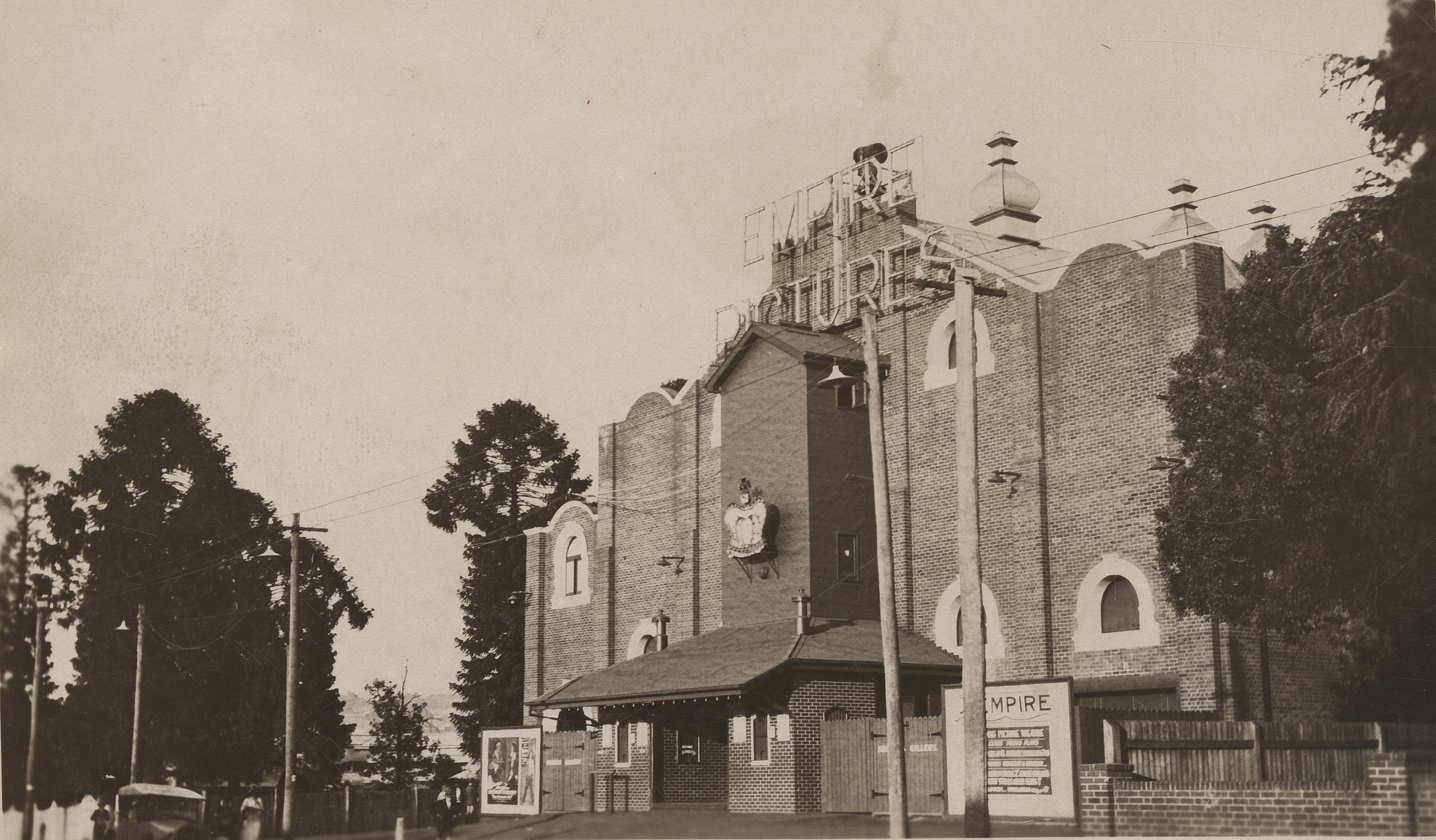
Empire Theatre in Toowoomba (1911-1933)

Crowds welcomed the Dungarees as they marched from Harristown along Drayton Road into West Street and then past the hospital in James Street on 20 November 1915. The matron, nurses and as many patients as were able, came out to wave them on.

A rally was held at the intersection of Ruthven and Margaret Streets with speeches from a range of military and political leaders. Toowoomba was praised for the 2,000 young men who had volunteered since the end of July—almost 10% of the population at the time. Perhaps ironically, this was the site that the Toowoomba Mothers' Memorial was installed after the war.

The rally at this intersection included the ceremonial unfurling of the Gallipoli Flag carried by the Stanthorpe contingent. Sergeant Day explained how he had been wounded there, but was keen to get back.

The men marched on to the showgrounds where they camped.

In the evening further short speeches were made at the Elite and the Empire picture theatres before the entertainment began. On Sunday morning 21 November 1915, the Dungarees participated in a church parade before being entertained by a band recital in the Toowoomba Botanic Gardens.

Recruits: 5 plus 3 nominated but not enlisted. A further 12 men from Toowoomba and other towns to the west joined up during this weekend, but it is unclear if they accompanied the Dungaree march to Brisbane.

== Helidon: 22–23 November 1915 ==
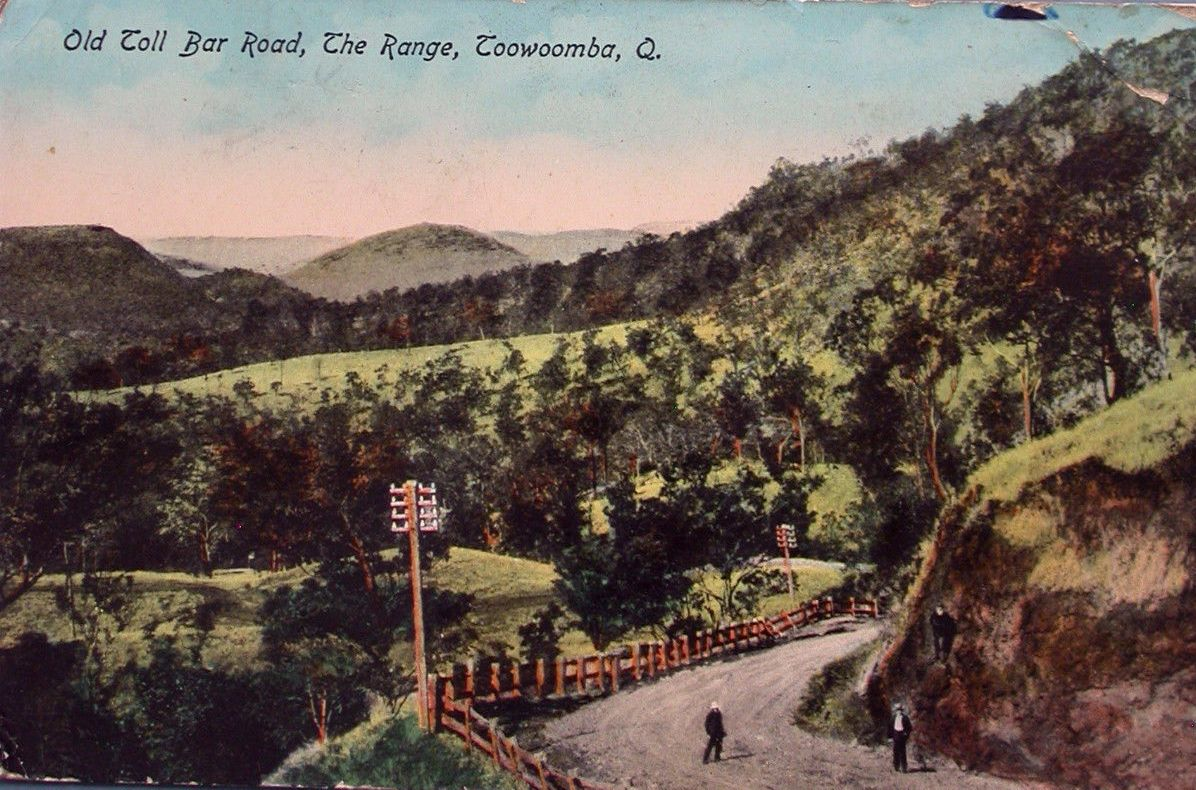
Old Toll Bar Road, Toowoomba, circa 1910

The Civic Guard formed a guard of honour as 52 Dungarees headed east out of Toowoomba to the edge of the range, on the morning of 22 November 1915. They halted at the top of the Toowoomba Toll Bar Road for a final farewell prior to their descent to the valley below. The Mayor of Toowoomba, Henry Webb, suggested that more Toowoomba men might join the march later as many were still making up their minds.

The men stopped for lunch at the Postman's Ridge School, then marched on to Helidon around 4pm. Local school children joined them for the last half mile singing patriotic songs and carrying flags.

The Dungarees had a refreshing swim in Lockyer Creek prior to dinner and another local recruitment drive, before setting up camp for the night in the reserve on the creek bank near the bridge. A local vehicle was provided to bring the kit bags from the train and a railway goods shed was made available in case of rain.

== Grantham: 23 November 1915 ==
After a hearty country breakfast in Helidon on the morning of 23 November 1915, the Dungarees marched to Grantham for lunch, where they were entertained by the local school children. The Lockyer Valley at this time was a rich farming area, which produced citrus and dairy products.

Recruits: 2

== Gatton: 23–24 November 1915 ==
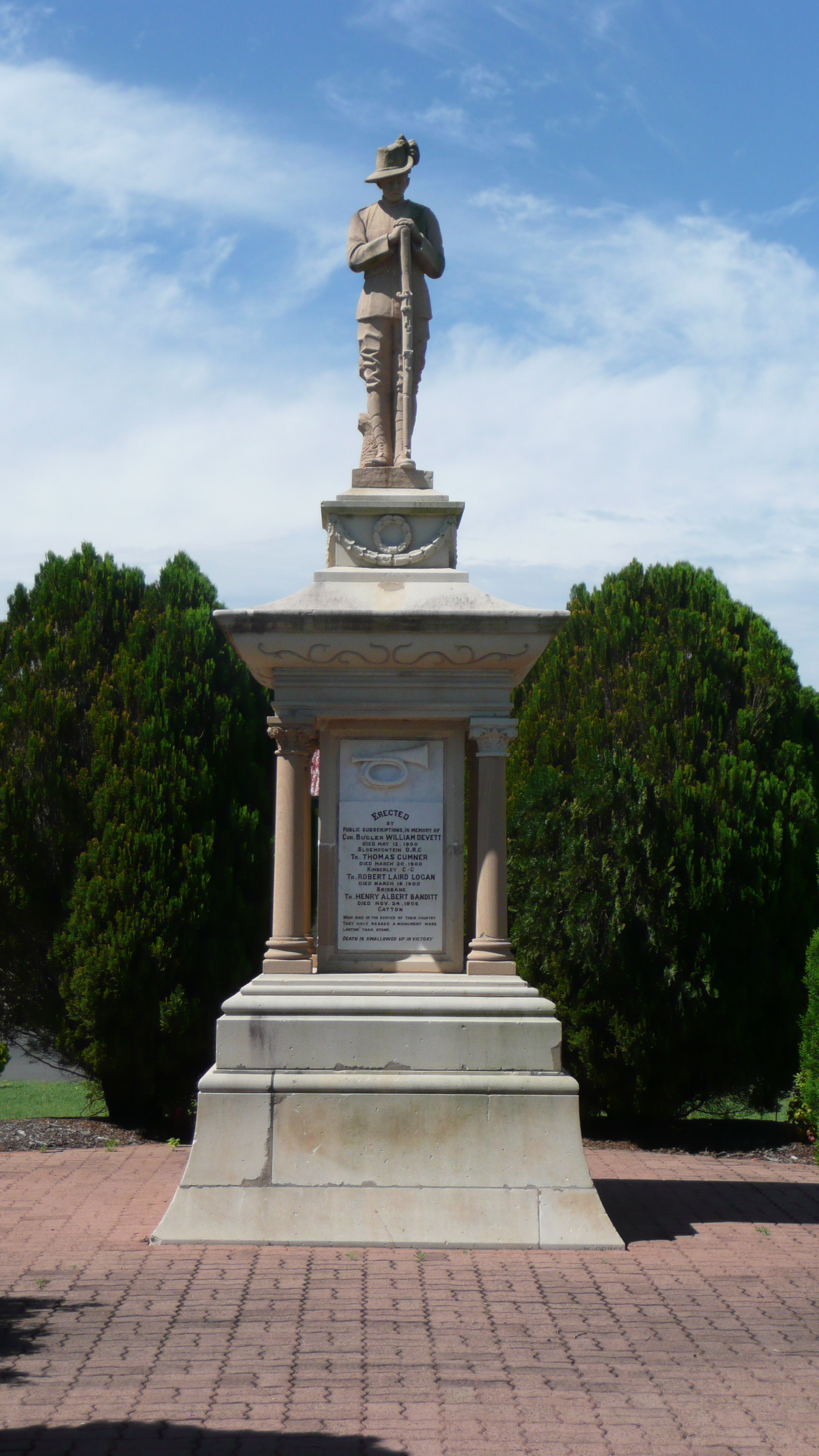
Gatton Boer War Memorial, 2010

The Dungarees then proceeded to Gatton, pausing to pay their respects at the Boer War Memorial in the late afternoon and speeches were made. Then they were entertained at an evening banquet at the Shire Hall and a dance at the School of Arts Hall.

A late breakfast at the Shire Hall on the morning of 24 November 1915 was followed with a march to the Gatton Agricultural College (now a campus of the University of Queensland). Lieutenant David Binnie, the Commanding Officer of the Dungarees, was a former student. After a short address by the Principal Mr Cuthbert Potts, the men were able to spend some time looking over the college before enjoying lunch.

Recruits: 2 but 1 later discharged on medical grounds

== Forest Hill: 24 November 1915 ==
The Dungarees moved on to Forest Hill for afternoon tea in School of Arts Hall on the 24 November 1915 where badges were presented to the volunteers by Miss G Logan—presumably a relative of former resident Major Thomas James Logan a member of the 2nd Light Horse Regiment who had died at Gallipoli in August 1915. A memorial service had been held in the hall for him. Major Logan's name is the first on the Forest Hill War Memorial, erected in 1921. He had also served in the Boer War.

Recruits: 2

== Laidley: 24–25 November 1915 ==
The Dungarees marched on to Laidley on the afternoon of 24 November 1915 accompanied by the bugle band of the local cadets. All the town shops closed at 3pm, and residents of the district gathered for a civic welcome near the railway crossing on Patrick Street. In the evening a concert and dance was held in the School of Arts Hall. Seven new recruits were sworn in—five from Laidley and two from Forest Hill. The Dungarees camped in the recreation reserve.

Recruits: 5

== Rosewood: 25–26 November 1915 ==
The Dungarees left Laidley on the morning of the 25 November 1915 accompanied by students from the North Laidley School. A long march over the Liverpool Range to Rosewood was ahead of them. Morning tea was provided at the Grandchester Hall on the other side of the range, before moving on to Calvert for lunch.

Rosewood was their destination for the night. Initially the men went to the showgrounds where their camp had already been set up for them and afternoon tea was provided. Later that afternoon, the Ipswich Model Band led march up John Street to the post office and on to the school grounds where a reception was held. Lieutenant Binnie reported that they had left Stanthorpe with eight men and now had 69.

A social event was held in the Farmers Hall and new recruits were sworn in.

Recruits: 3

== Ipswich – One Mile Bridge: 26 November 1915 ==
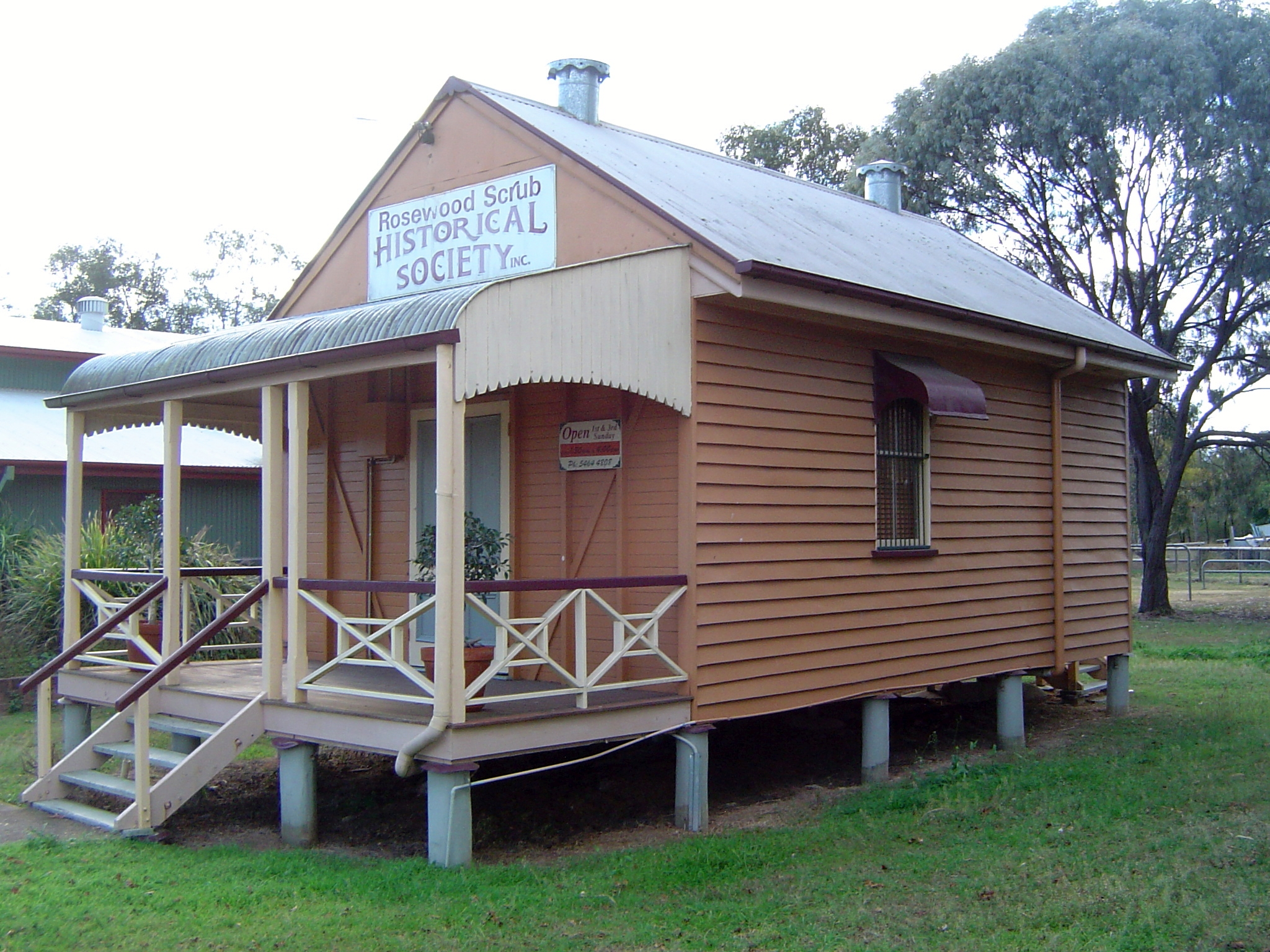
Former Walloon Shire Hall (now museum), 2014

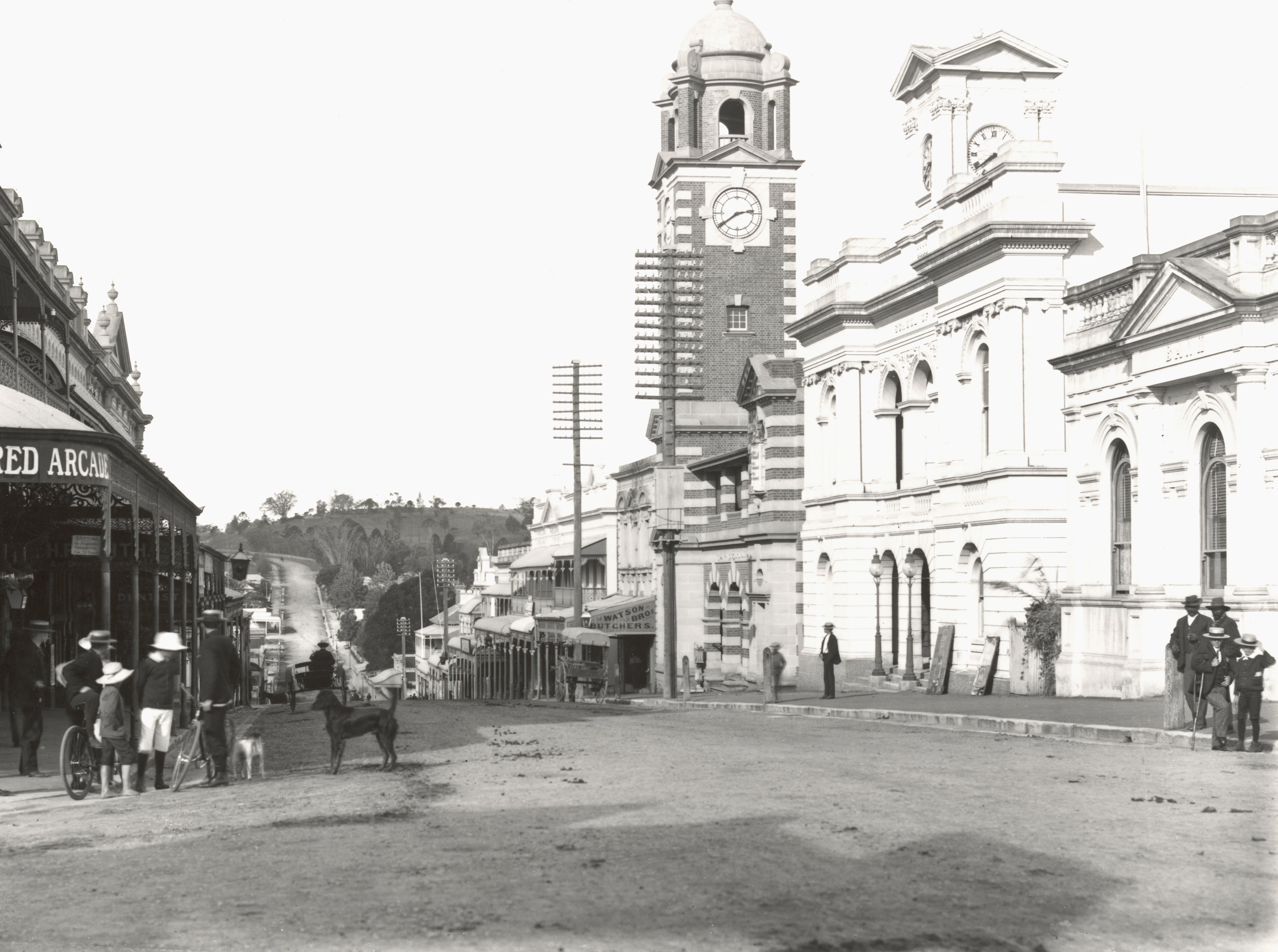
Ipswich town hall (right) on Brisbane Street

News of the recruitment march inspired men throughout the district to join up. Meetings had been held in the nearby towns of Esk and Blackbutt and in the Fassifern district towns of Boonah, Engeslburg (Kalbar) and Harrisville. Those inspired to join the march travelled to Ipswich by various means. The largest of these groups—23 from the Fassifern district—departed Boonah on Friday 26 November 1915. A parade up High Street and a farewell social had been held in the Boonah School of Arts Hall the previous evening. These recruits were taken by car to Ipswich to join the Dungarees the same day.

The Dungarees marched through Mount Marrow and Walloon, with afternoon tea served by the Walloon Shire Council.

Meanwhile, preparations in Ipswich began with everyone gathering at the Town Hall. Then the Fassifern recruits, the Boonah band, a local pipers' band, cadets, bugle band, scouts, other military forces and citizens of Ipswich all marched to the One Mile Bridge just outside of Ipswich town centre. There was great excitement when the band of Dungarees came into view. After a brief rest, everyone marched back into town, gathering in the grounds of St Paul's Church.

Recruits:

- from Boonah: 12 plus 9 nominated but not enlisted
- from Harrisville: 7 plus 1 nominated but not enlisted
- from Blackbutt: 1
- from Kilcoy: 1
- from Esk: 4

== Ipswich – St Paul's Anglican Church and Town Hall: 26–28 November 1915 ==
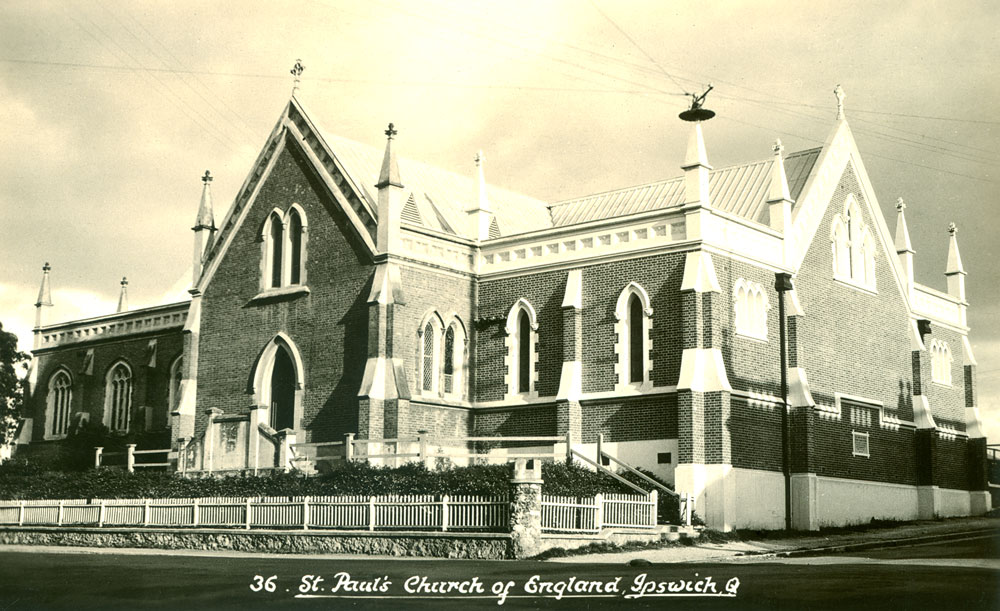
St Paul's Church of England, 1940s

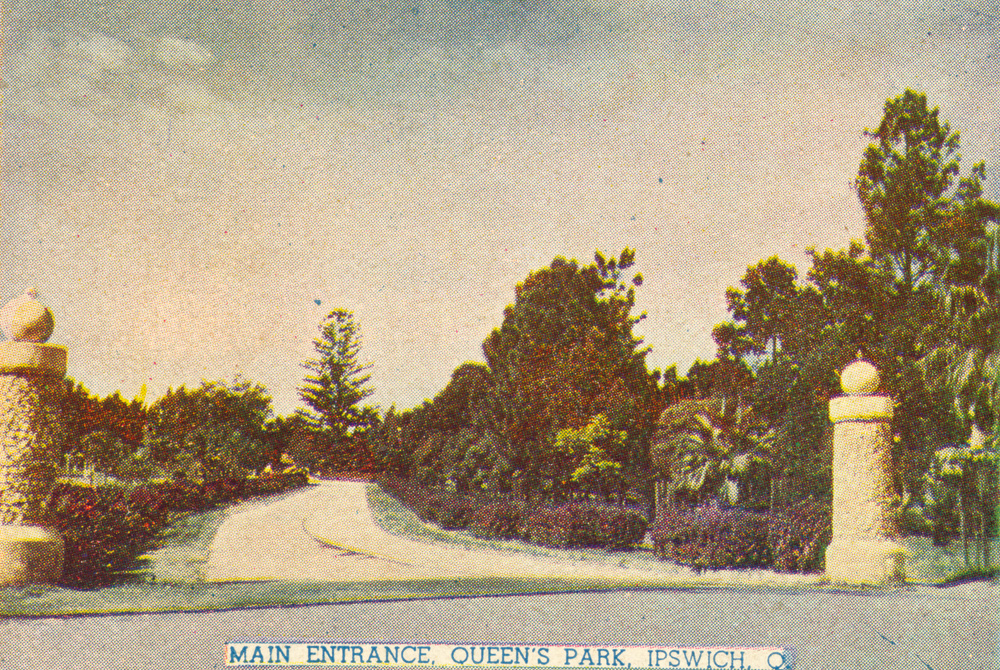
Main entrance, Queen's Park, 1940s

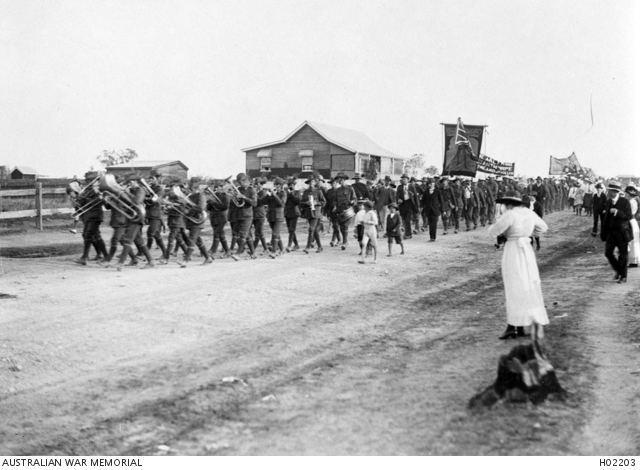
The Dungarees, led by an army band, passing through Ipswich en route to Brisbane, November 1915

On the afternoon of 26 November 1915, Ipswich shops and businesses were gaily decorated and closed to allow employees to participate in welcoming the Dungarees.

Men from the North Ipswich Railway Workshops had joined in too. A platform was erected in the grounds of St Paul's Church on which ladies of the Patriotic Committee were seated along with local school children. Lieutenant Binnie was pleasantly surprised to find his wife and little daughter Myrra seated amongst the ladies. The school children sang patriotic songs and further speeches were made.

The men made their way to the Drill Shed in Queens Park to camp for the night. Rain caused the cancellation of a street parade that night, but a recruitment meeting proceeded and a further 44 men were sworn in.

On Saturday 27 November 1915 the men were given the freedom of the city, including a swim in the public baths. A church parade was held on Sunday 28 November 1915 followed by a band recital in Queens Park.

Eight men who were recruited in Ipswich chose to take the train to Brisbane rather than join in the march.

The following morning, the Dungarees marched out of town over Limestone Hill enabling the students from Ipswich Girls' Grammar School to bid them a final farewell.

Recruits:

- from Walloon: 1
- from Ipswich: 15 plus 4 nominated but not enlisted

== Bundamba: 29 November 1915 ==
The Dungarees marched along Ipswich Road on the morning of 29 November 1915, stopping first at Bundamba where they were welcomed by waiting townsfolk and school students. The ladies of the Bundamba Patriotic Committee provided refreshments. Two more recruits joined up after a heartfelt speech from the father of a recently deceased soldier. An honour board at the school was unveiled.

Recruits: 1

== Redbank: 29 November 1915 ==
The Dungarees marched on through Ebbw Vale towards Redbank. A troop train came into view—its occupants heading for the Dardanelles were waving enthusiastically from the train. Then students from the Dinmore State School joined in the march to Redbank where a railway navvy threw down his shovel and joined them.

Recruits: 0, plus 1 nominated but not enlisted

== Goodna: 29 November 1915 ==
By the time the Dungarees reached Goodna, they were hot and dusty. They were welcomed at the Goodna Recreation Reserve by the chairman of the Purga Shire Council. The crowds included children from the Redbank and Goodna State Schools, the Goodna Convent School and a large number of residents travelling in buggies.

As soon as the reception was over, the men made a dash for the river banks where temporary dressing sheds had been erected. A swim cooled them off before lunch in the shade of the gum trees, supplied by the local meat and smallgoods manufacturers. The newspapers reported 130 Dungarees arriving in Goodna, but as Lieutenant Binnie pointed out, there were often discrepancies in the numbers. This was because not all men nominating passed the medical test, while others nominated, but deferred their enlistment until arrangements were made with their employers.

== Oxley: 29–30 November 1915 ==
On 29 November 1915, the last leg of the day was the march from Goodna to Oxley. At Darra the Dungarees were met by members of the Sherwood, Indooroopilly, Toowong and Taringa Rifle Clubs. Then the No1 Depot Expeditionary Forces Band and the Sherwood Boy Scouts joined in, as well as the senior students from the Oxley and Sherwood schools and the Scout nurses.

The Mayor of South Brisbane, Alderman Davey, welcomed them, along with numerous other local government representatives. An open air dinner was held in the grounds of the Oxley State School followed by a campfire concert, before the men rolled into their camp beds for the night.

Recruits: 0 plus 1 nominated but not enlisted

== Brisbane : 30 November 1915 ==
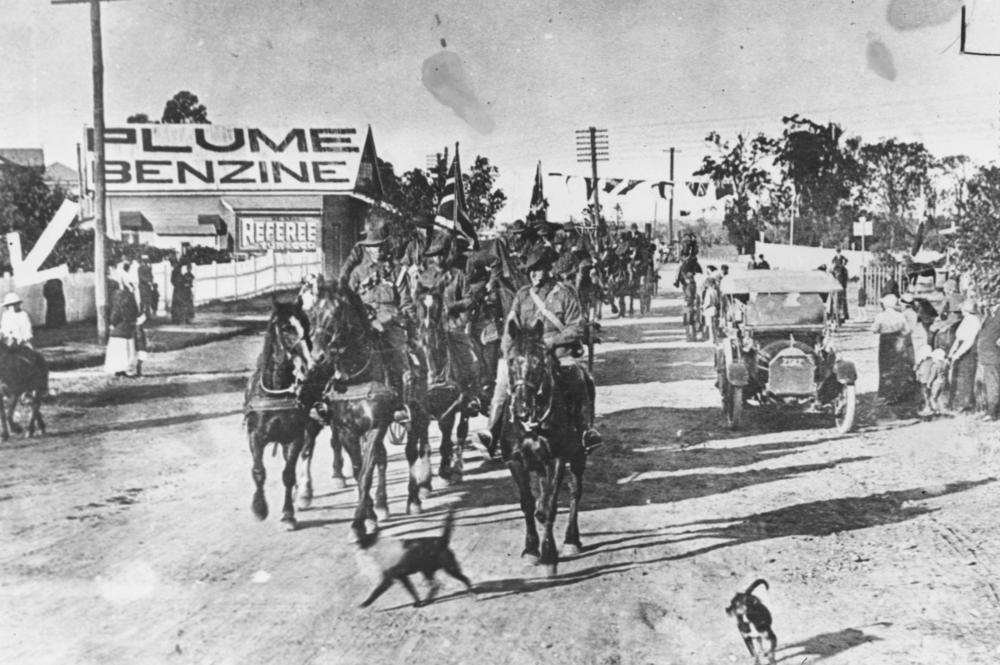
Dungarees passing along Ipswich Road, Moorooka, 1915

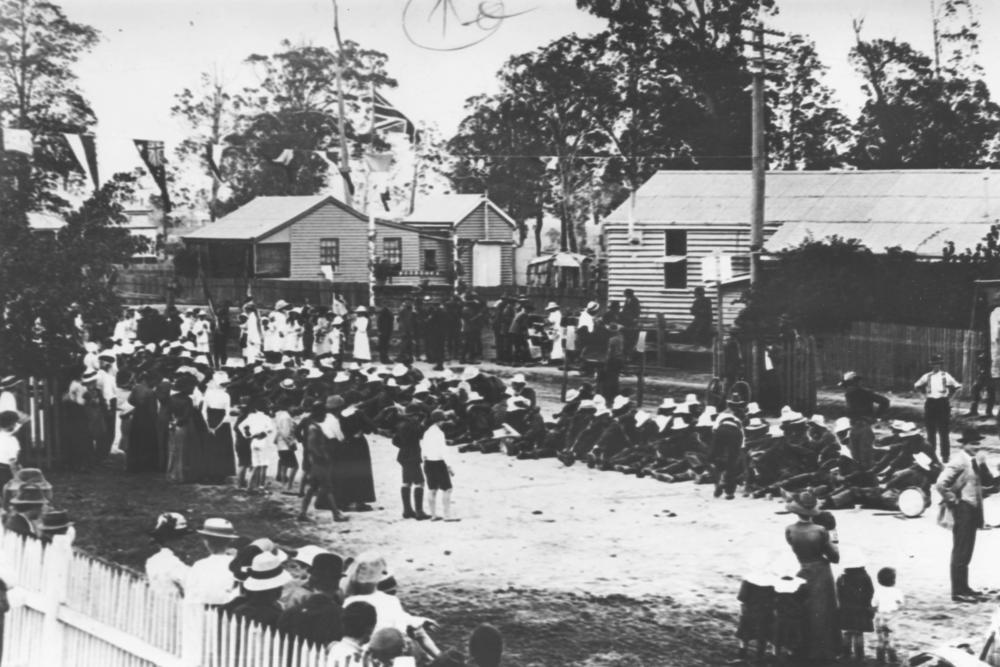
Dungarees resting during a march on Ipswich Road, Moorooka, 1915

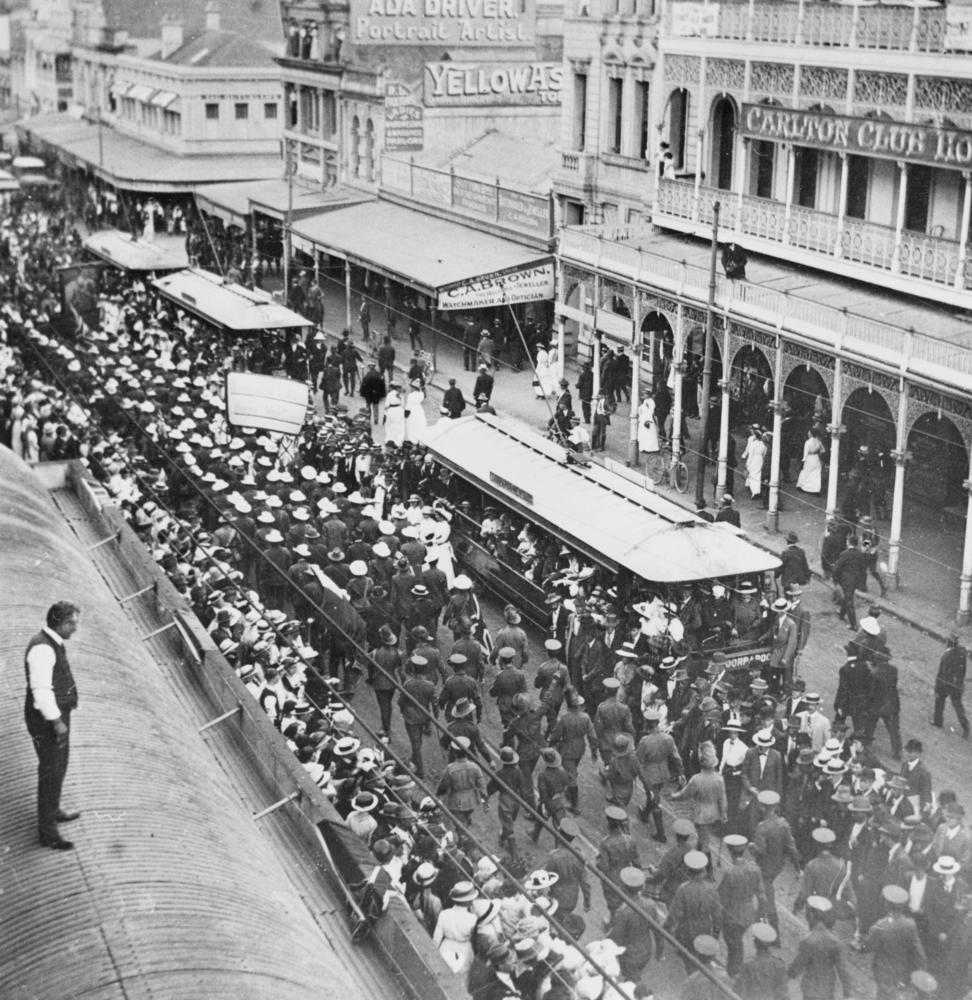
Dungarees marching along Queen Street, Brisbane, 1915

The final day's march from Oxley to Brisbane began early on 30 November 1915. Participation from local schools, bands and scouting groups, provided a festive atmosphere for the Dungarees. They stopped for refreshments at Moorooka around 8am and moved on to the Junction Park State School for breakfast by 8.45am.

They marched along Ipswich Road reaching the Woolloongabba five-ways at 10.30am on 30 November 1915 where the Mayor of South Brisbane, Alderman J Davey and his aldermen greeted them. Canon Hay of St Andrew's Church, South Brisbane said that he was pleased to see that Warwick headed the list of the Dungarees, having lived there previously. He congratulated them for taking part in what he thought would be the most glorious victory the Empire had ever achieved.

A large crowd gathered and cheers rang out, as did the fog-signals from the trains in the Woolloongabba railway yards (now part of the South East Busway). The Railway Band led the march of the Dungarees down Stanley Street on 30 November 1915. Enthusiastic crowds gathered in every doorway and veranda, and flags fluttered overhead.

At around 11.20am the Dungarees reached the South Brisbane Baths. After a short swim they were provided with soft drinks, cakes and cigarettes. The Governor, Sir Hamilton Goold Adams, met the men at the baths and congratulated them on supporting the cause which Great Britain was fighting for. He marched with the men and members of the South Brisbane Town Council to the Victoria Bridge.

On the northern side of the bridge the Dungarees were met by the Mayor of North Brisbane, Alderman G. Down, and his aldermen on 30 November 1915 before a triumphal march down Queen Street accompanied by many khaki-clad troops. Tramcars were stopped in Queen Street, and people climbed onto them to get a better view. The windows of buildings either side of the street, as well as the roadways, were filled with spectators, as the parade made its way to Albert Square (now King George Square).

The Premier, the Hon. T J Ryan, attended the final phase of the march, officiated by the Mayor of Brisbane, who congratulated the recruits on the example they had shown to other young men, and hoped that their sacrifice would encourage others to join up. The final number of recruits was reported at 150. Each man had been presented with a gum leaf with the word Anzac written on it, to carry in their pockets.

A celebratory lunch was provided at the Old Government House Domain, overlooking the Brisbane River. In the afternoon, the Dungarees marched to Central railway station and caught the train to Enoggera Camp, where their training would commence.

== Enoggera and then to war ==
Most of the Dungarees had expected to serve at Gallipoli, but troops were withdrawn from there by 20 December 1915. Instead the Dungarees were sent to either the Middle East or the Western Front. Most of the Dungarees were recruited into the 11th Reinforcements of the 25th Battalion. Others were given specialist roles in other battalions depending on their qualifications and work experience.

On Sunday 12 March 1916, prior to their departure from Brisbane, the 11th Reinforcements were taken on a boat trip to Redcliffe on the "Beaver". They marched from Thompson's Paddock at Enoggera to the train, and then to the Central railway station, marching down to the dock for the trip. Food and drink were provided by a range of local companies keen to show their support for the soldiers.

Officially the exact date, ship and route of the men's departure overseas were not publicised. However, news was often spread by less official means; for example, Dungaree Sydney Marsh of Silkstone cabled his parents and they forwarded the news to the Queensland Times newspaper. Marsh indicated that the 11th reinforcements of the 25th Battalion had arrived in Egypt on 11 May 1916 and were expecting to head to the front in France soon.

== Aftermath of the March ==
Despite the strong support for the march shown along the route by the townsfolk, the Brisbane Courier expressed disappointment in the overall numbers of men recruited, given the high recruitment expectations demanded by the Australian Government. However, the Courier praised those who had enlisted through the march as "splendid" "high-spirited patriots" in contrast to the "lethargic" "craven" "slackers" who were able to enlist but did not heed the call.

== Legacy ==
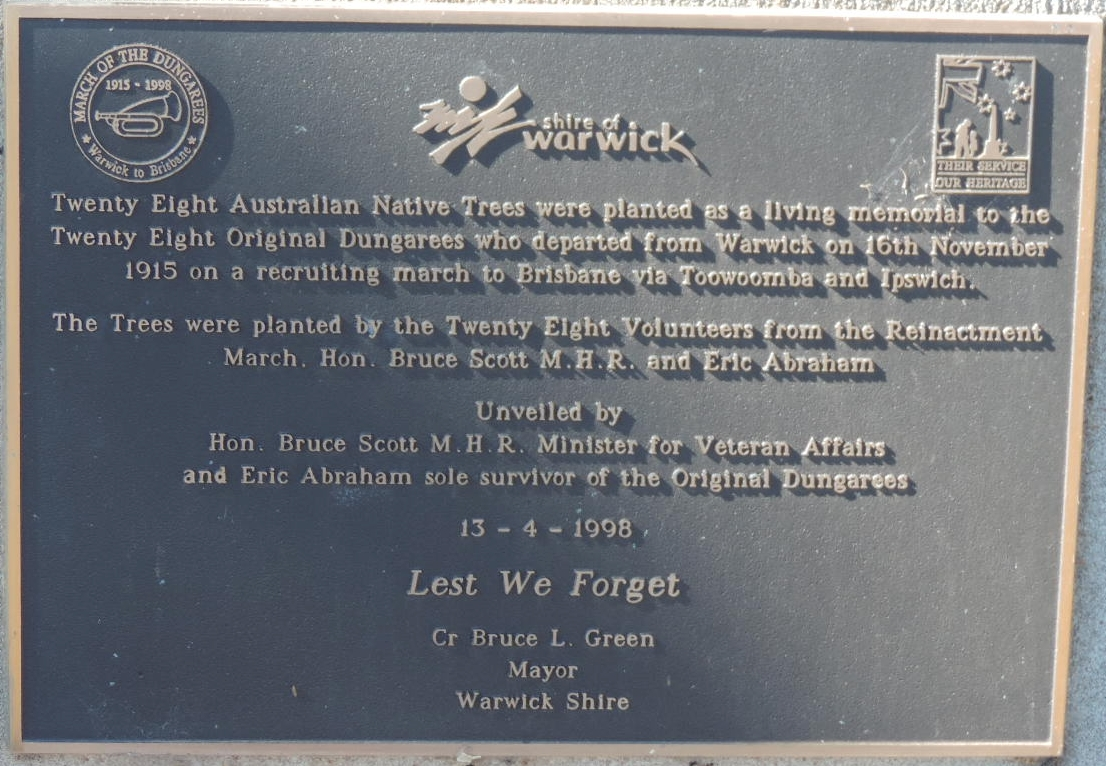
1998 commemorative plaque for the March of the Dungarees, Wentworth Street, Warwick

In April 1998, a re-enactment March of the Dungarees left Warwick on 13 April to arrive as part of the Anzac Day march in Brisbane on 25 April. Warwick Shire Council celebrated the occasion by planting an avenue of 28 native Australian trees to commemorate the 28 original "dungarees" who departed from Warwick on 16 November 1915. A plaque was unveiled on 13 April 1998 by Bruce Scott, Minister for Veteran Affairs and Eric Abraham (Queensland's last surviving recruit from the March of the Dungarees).

In 2015, as part of the Centenary Commemorations for World War I, army cadets re-enacted the March of the Dungarees, starting at Warwick on 12 December 2015 and marching 239 kilometres to Brisbane arriving on 19 December 2015.
