= Eric Abraham (soldier) =

Australian World War I veteran

Eric Kingsley Abraham
- Born: 20 April 1898
- Died: 20 March 2003 (aged 104)
- Known for: known as the last surviving recruit of Australia's famous snowball march

Eric Kingsley Abraham (20 April 1898 – 20 March 2003) was an Australian World War I veteran who is notable for having been the last surviving recruit of Australia's famous snowball march, the March of the Dungarees.

Abraham was working as a postal officer at Boonah when he was recruited in Ipswich, Queensland in 1915, but only after convincing his mother to sign the enlistment form to state that he was over the age of 18, despite only being 17. He joined the 5th Division in Brisbane before sailing from Sydney to Cairo and then to London where he was transferred from the infantry to signal engineers, before ultimately travelling to France.

During his service, Abraham was involved in many battles including the Battle of Amiens, the Battle of Passchendaele and operations in Villers-Bretonneux and Morlancourt. Abraham considered the Battle of Passchendaele the worst regarding the amount of action and shell fire he encountered.

Abraham also witnessed The Red Baron being shot down. According to Abraham, after being told The Red Baron was in the air, he watched the German fighter pilot manoeuvring around in the sky before the plane was shot down to cheers on the ground. Abraham said that he never thought he'd see the day when he cheered when someone died. He was discharged in October 1919. He said he considered himself lucky to return home alive, describing war as a "strange thing" due to the unpredictability of who would be killed during battle.

Upon returning home, Abraham worked at a post office in Laidley, Queensland while also becoming a qualified accountant, later working for the Australian Taxation Office, the Prices Commission and the National Insurance Commission. Abraham also served as an executive officer for the Department of Health. He moved to Brisbane in 1981.

In 1998, Abraham was part of a commemorative delegation that returned to Villers-Bretonneux to mark the 80th anniversary of Armistice, during which he was awarded the Legion of Honour recognising his service on the Western Front.

In 1999, Abraham was awarded the 80th Anniversary Armistice Remembrance Medal. As a living Australian citizen who was born prior to the Federation of Australia, Abraham was awarded the Centenary Medal in 2001.

In 1999, Abraham published his autobiography, A Dungaree Digger.

After suffering a series of strokes he died at the age of 104 on 20 March 2003 at an RSL nursing home in Pinjarra Hills, just one month short of his 105th birthday. Abraham's death resulted in Ted Smout being Queensland's last surviving World War I veteran.

Abraham was given a state funeral held at St John's Cathedral in Brisbane on 27 March 2003.
