= Land Tax Act 1910 =

Repealed Australian legislation

Parliament of Australia
- Long title: An Act to impose a Progressive Land Tax upon Unimproved Values.
- Citation: No. 21 of 1910
- Territorial extent: States and territories of Australia
- Assented to: 16 November 1910
- Repealed: 1 April 1953

Repealed by
- Land Tax Abolition Act 1953
- Status: Repealed

The Land Tax Act 1910 (Cth) and the related Land Tax Assessment Act 1910 (Cth) were acts of the Parliament of Australia which imposed a progressive land tax on the unimproved value of land. They were enacted in November 1910 by the Fisher Labour Government intent on breaking up a number of very large holdings of underutilised, arable land that was secured during the colonial period.

== The act ==
The Land Tax Act's main provision was a graduated tax on the unimproved value of land that applied to the total value of land owned by absentees and applied to the value of the land minus the first £3,000 for non-absentees. A Commissioner of Land Taxation was appointed to administer the legislation and an office under the direction of the Commissioner was created as a branch of Treasury. The first tax return forms were sent on 10 January 1911, which landholders were required to complete so they could be assessed for their land-tax liabilities. The returns were due back by 1 March 1911. Assessments were issued to taxpayers by 21 April 1911, and the tax was payable by the end of June 1911.

The tax was not popular with landowners, but a challenge to it in the High Court of Australia found it constitutional. Land valuations brought loud complaints and became the most contentious aspect of the new tax. Landowners had to state the value of their land in their returns, but the tax office could reject those valuations. Landowners could object to assessments, and by mid 1913 over 1,800 appeals and objections had been filed. In its first year about 15,000 land tax returns were assessed. In the first three years land tax revenue was around £1.3 to £1.4 million a year.

== Legacy ==
While the land tax made a contribution to Commonwealth revenue, it was debatable whether it had done much to break up the large estates for closer settlement, and the statistics did not paint a clear picture of what had happened. Some landholders, for example, would reduce their tax liability by splitting their landholdings to relatives, partners or companies to take them below the taxable threshold, and in many cases the cost of the tax was passed on to purchasers or tenants.

The land tax was abolished by the Land Tax Abolition Act 1953.

== See also ==
- Taxation in Australia
