= Australian Notes Act 1910 =

Parliamentary act creating Australian pound as national currency on 16 September 1910

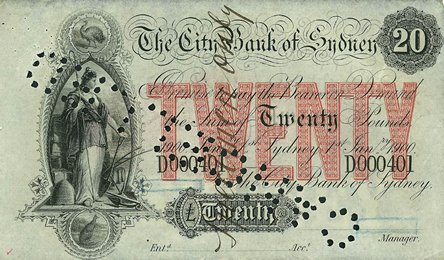
- Private currency issued by the City Bank of Sydney c. 1900

Parliament of Australia
- Assented to: 16 September 1910
- Repealed: 14 December 1920
- Status: Repealed

The Australian Notes Act 1910 was an act of the Parliament of Australia which allowed for the creation of Australia's first national banknotes. In conjunction with the Coinage Act 1909 it created the Australian pound as a separate national currency from the pound sterling.

The act was enacted on 16 September 1910 by the Fisher Labour Government under Section 51 (xii) of the Constitution of Australia, which gives the Commonwealth Parliament the power to legislate with respect to "currency, coinage, and legal tender".

The act gave control over the issue of Australian notes to the Commonwealth Treasury and prohibited the circulation of state notes and withdrew their status as legal tender. The Bank Notes Tax Act 1910, enacted in October of that year imposed a prohibitive tax on banknotes issued by banks in Australia by imposing an annual tax of 10% on "all bank notes issued or re-issued by any bank in the Commonwealth after the commencement of this Act and not redeemed", which effectively ended the use of private currency in Australia.

== Transitional measures ==
As transitional measures, blank note forms of 16 banks were supplied to the Australian Government in 1911 to be overprinted as redeemable in gold and issued as the first Commonwealth notes. For the next three years, some of the earlier private banknotes were overprinted by the Treasury and circulated as Australian banknotes until new designs were ready for Australia's first federal government-issued banknotes, which commenced in 1913.

== Subsequent events ==
The Australian Notes Act 1910 was repealed on 14 December 1920 by the Commonwealth Bank Act 1920, which gave note issuing authority to the Commonwealth Bank. In 1960, responsibility for note printing passed to the Reserve Bank of Australia (RBA).

Section 44(1) of the Reserve Bank Act 1959 now prohibits private and state currencies. The section prohibits any person or a state from issuing "a bill or note for the payment of money payable to bearer on demand and intended for circulation". In 1976, Wickrema Weerasooria suggested that the issuing of bank cheques contravened s. 44(1); banks responded that bank cheques were printed with the words "not negotiable" on them, which marked them as not intended for circulation, and hence they did not violate the section.

== See also ==
- Section 51(xii) of the Australian Constitution
- Australian dollar
- Bank Notes Tax Act 1910
