= Victor Denton War Memorial =

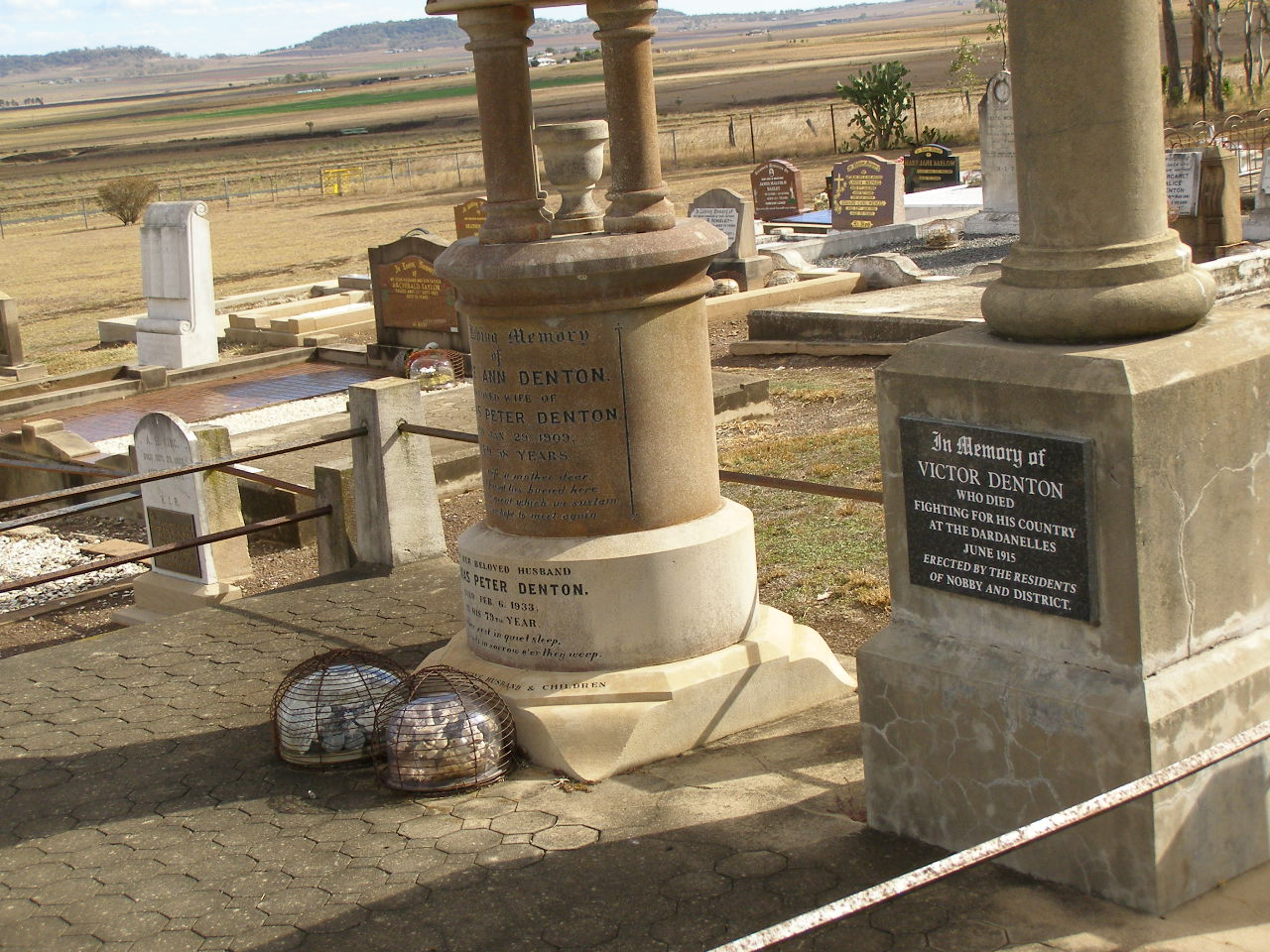
- Victor Denton War Memorial, Nobby cemetery, 2007

- Location within Queensland
- 27.8487°S 151.8958°E
- Location: Nobby Cemetery, Nobby, Queensland, Australia

History
- Design period: 1914–1919 (World War I)
- Built: 1915

Queensland Heritage Register
- Official name: Victor Denton War Memorial
- Type: state heritage (built)
- Designated: 21 October 1992
- Reference no.: 600414
- Significant period: 1915– (social); 1915 (historical, fabric)
- Significant components: memorial – other, memorial surrounds/railings
- Builders: Bruce Brothers

Victor Denton War Memorial is a heritage-listed memorial at Nobby Cemetery, Nobby, Toowoomba Region, Queensland, Australia. It was made in 1915 by Bruce Brothers. It was added to the Queensland Heritage Register on 21 October 1992.

== History ==
The Victor Denton War Memorial at Nobby was erected in 1915 and was made by Bruce Brothers, monumental masons of Toowoomba. Funds for the memorial were raised by local residents of the district, making it an uncommon example of a public memorial erected in a cemetery. The memorial honours Private Victor Denton who was killed at the Dardanelles on 16 June 1915 and is the first known memorial of the First World War erected in Queensland. The monument was unveiled on 18 November 1915 as part of the March of the Dungarees, a snowball march aimed at recruiting more soldiers for the Australian Imperial Force.

The town of Nobby is located on the Darling Downs. The first white settlers arrived on the Downs in search of rich grazing land and by the 1840s, led by the Leslie brothers and John Campbell had established over twenty stations. These stations prospered until their expansion was curbed due to the pressures of selection legislation and land was resumed for agricultural use. The area, which had previously been a primary producer of wool, diversified into wheat and dairy farming. By the 1920s, wheat had become the primary crop with Queensland Government experimental farms providing the area with superior varieties of wheat.

Prior to the First World War, few civic monuments existed in Australia or Queensland. The war memorials constructed afterward served as early national monuments, reflecting the casualty rate and societal impact of the conflict. Approximately 60,000 Australians died out of a population of roughly roue million, representing one in five of those who served.

Even before the end of the war, memorials became a spontaneous and highly visible expression of national grief. To those who erected them, they were as sacred as grave sites, substitute graves for the Australians whose bodies lay in battlefield cemeteries in Europe and the Middle East. British policy decreed that the Empire war dead were to be buried where they fell. The word "cenotaph", commonly applied to war memorials at the time, literally means "empty tomb".

Australian war memorials are distinctive in that they commemorate not only the dead. Australians were proud that their first great national army, unlike other belligerent armies, was composed entirely of volunteers, men worthy of honour whether or not they made the supreme sacrifice. Many memorials honour all who served from a locality, not just the dead, providing valuable evidence of community involvement in the war. Such evidence is not readily obtainable from military records, or from state or national listings, where names are categorised alphabetically or by military unit.

Australian war memorials are also valuable evidence of imperial and national loyalties, at the time, not seen as conflicting; the skills of local stonemasons, metalworkers and architects; and of popular taste. In Queensland, the digger (soldier) statue was the popular choice of memorial, whereas the obelisk predominated in the southern states, possibly a reflection of Queensland's larger working-class population and a lesser involvement of architects.

Many of the First World War monuments have been updated to record local involvement in later conflicts, and some have fallen victim to unsympathetic re-location and repair.

There were many different types of memorials in Queensland, however the broken column was more commonly used as a funereal monument, symbolic of life cut short. When the erection of memorials became prolific in Queensland, it was unusual for them to be located in cemeteries, as this one is. They were more likely to be erected in more publicly accessible places such as gardens or intersections.

== Description ==
The First World War Memorial is situated in a cemetery located away from the town centre. The cemetery is on a sloping site in a sparsely treed landscape, making it a dominant local landmark.

The concrete and stone memorial is located within the Denton family plot alongside the grave of Victor Denton's parents. The plot is surrounded by a low fence comprising concrete tapered plinths which are joined by a steel rod. The elevated surface is laid with octagonal pavers.

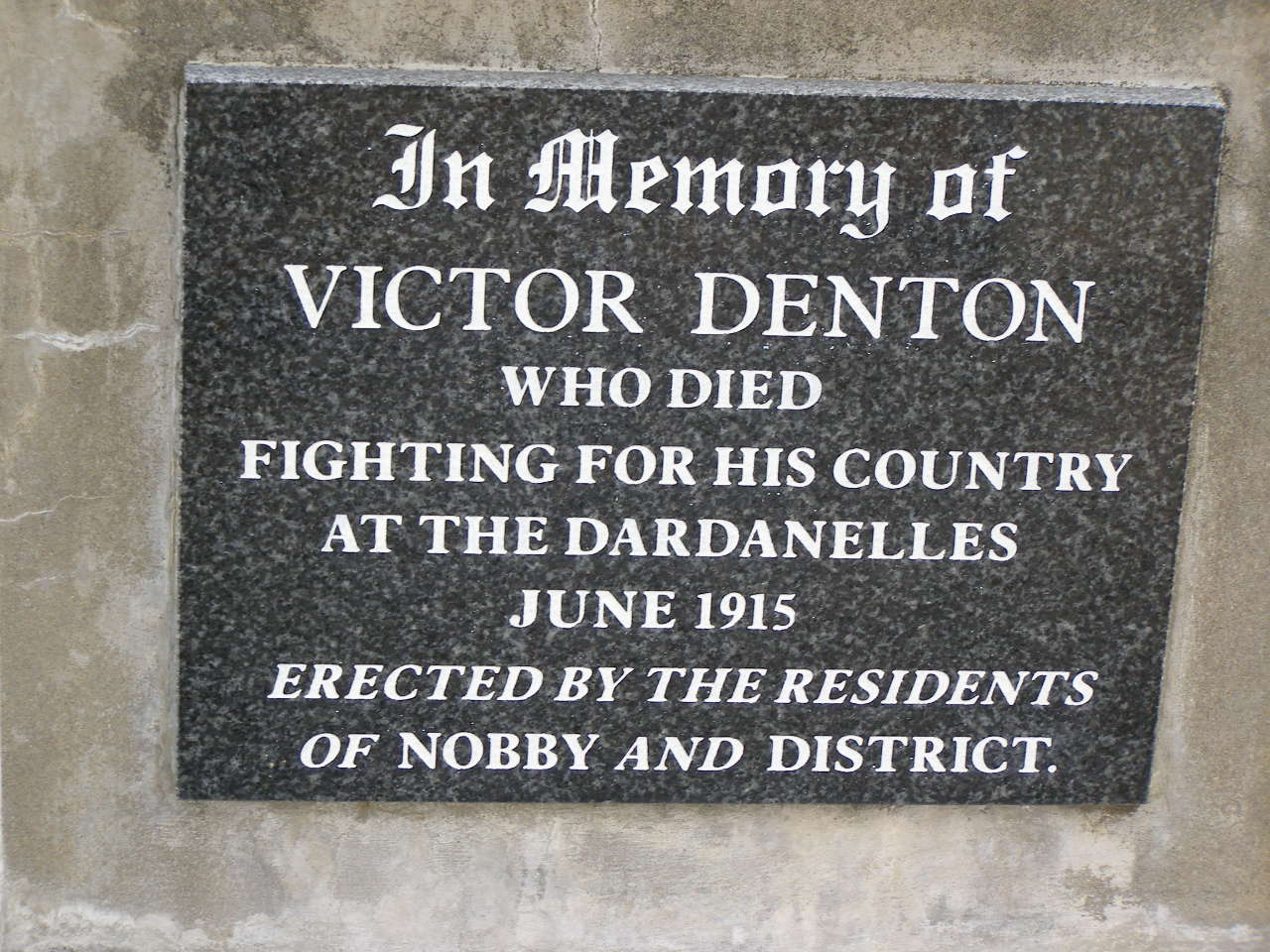
Plaque, Victor Denton War Memorial, Nobby cemetery, 2007

The memorial itself sits on a base which is square in plan with a chamfered top edge. From this projects a short pedestal, also with a chamfered top edge. The front face has a marble plaque with an inscription in memory of Victor Denton in cut and blackened lettering.

The pedestal is surmounted by a broken column with a simply moulded base.

== Heritage listing ==
Victor Denton War Memorial was listed on the Queensland Heritage Register on 21 October 1992 having satisfied the following criteria.

The place is important in demonstrating the evolution or pattern of Queensland's history.

War Memorials are important in demonstrating the pattern of Queensland's history as they are representative of a recurrent theme that involved most communities throughout the state. They provide evidence of an era of widespread Australian patriotism and nationalism, particularly during and following the First World War. The monuments manifest a unique documentary record and are demonstrative of popular taste in the inter-war period.

The place demonstrates rare, uncommon or endangered aspects of Queensland's cultural heritage.

It is of particular significance as the first known memorial to the First World War, as well as being one of the few memorials dedicated to a single person and erected in a cemetery.

The place is important in demonstrating the principal characteristics of a particular class of cultural places.

The monuments have an uncommon record of documentaries, and may demonstrate a specific taste in the inter-war period.

Erected in 1915, the war memorial at Nobby demonstrates the principal characteristics of a commemorative structure erected as an enduring record of a major historical event. This is achieved through the use of appropriate materials and design elements.

The place is important because of its aesthetic significance.

The memorial in its cemetery setting is of aesthetic significance for its landmark qualities.

The place has a strong or special association with a particular community or cultural group for social, cultural or spiritual reasons.

It has a strong and continuing association with the community as evidence of the impact of a major historic event and as the focal point for the remembrance of that event.

The place has a special association with the life or work of a particular person, group or organisation of importance in Queensland's history.

It also has special association with the masonry firm of Bruce Brothers as an example of their workmanship.
