= Tax returns in Australia =

Australian tax returns for the tax year beginning 1 July and ending 30 June of the following year are generally due on 31 October after the end of the tax year.

Australian individual taxpayers can file their return online with the ATO's myTax software, by ordering a printed copy of the tax return form, or with the assistance of a tax agent. Until 2011, the Australian Taxation Office (ATO) published TaxPack, a free document designed to help individuals complete their return. In 2012, TaxPack was replaced with a smaller instruction document, due to increased usage of the e-tax software.

Extensions of the deadline for lodging a tax return are automatically available to those individuals using a Registered Tax Agent operating on an extended lodgement system, and extensions can be made available under some circumstances.

In Australia, individuals and taxpaying entities with taxable income might need to lodge different returns with the ATO in respect of various forms of taxation.

== See also ==
- Taxation in Australia
- Tax return (Canada)
- Tax return (United Kingdom)
- Tax return (United States)
