= Bank Notes Tax Act 1910 =

Repealed Australian law

Parliament of Australia
- Long title: An Act to impose a Tax upon Bank Notes.
- Citation: No. 14 of 1910
- Assented to: 10 October 1910
- Repealed: 21 August 1945

Repealed by
- Commonwealth Bank Act 1945
- Status: Repealed

The Bank Notes Tax Act 1910 (Cth) was an act of the Parliament of Australia which imposed a prohibitive tax on banknotes issued by banks in Australia. The act was enacted in October 1910 by the Fisher Labour Government under Section 51 (xii) of the Constitution of Australia, that gives the Commonwealth Parliament the power to legislate concerning “currency, coinage, and legal tender” and the taxing power.

== The act ==
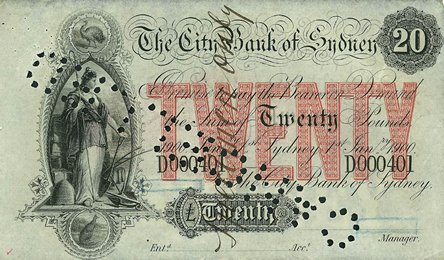
Private currency issued by the City Bank of Sydney c. 1900

The act imposed an annual tax of 10% on "all bank notes issued or re-issued by any bank in the Commonwealth after the commencement of this Act and not redeemed." The tax commenced in March 1911.

In September 1910, the federal government had passed the Australian Notes Act 1910, which introduced an Australian national currency, the Australian pound, and, as part of the scheme, the objective of the act was to end the use of private currency in Australia, which it had achieved.

== Legacy ==
The act was repealed by the Commonwealth Bank Act 1945, enacted by the Chifley Labor government, which instead imposed a fine for issuing a private currency. Section 44 of the Reserve Bank Act 1959 now prohibits private and state currencies.

== See also ==
- Section 51(xii) of the Australian Constitution – Legal powers of the Australian parliament
- Private currency
- Taxation in Australia
- Australian dollar
- Australian Notes Act 1910
