= List of High Court of Australia cases =

This article contains a list of cases decided by the High Court of Australia.

Citation numbers for the decisions are as tracked by LawCite, a citation tracker managed by the Free Access to Law Movement.

LawCite Rank	Case Name	Decision Date	Case citation (CLR & HCA only)	Chief Justice	# LawCite citations	Area(s) of Law	Notable holdings
1.	Chan Yee Kin v Minister for Immigration & Ethnic Affairs	1989	169 CLR 379; [1989] HCA 62	Mason	34143	Refugee	Under the 1951 Refugee Convention and 1967 Status of Refugees protocol, a finding that a person has a 'well founded fear' of persecution; is satisfied by there being a 'real chance' the relevant harm will occur.
2.	House v R	1936	55 CLR 499; [1936] HCA 40	Latham	11949	Criminal Administrative	Set out the five grounds by which an exercise of discretion can be appealed. (1) Misapplication of law, (2) Applied irrelevant facts, (3) Mistook the facts, (4) Overlooked a material consideration, (5) Outcome of discretion was manifestly unreasonable, or plainly unjust.
3.	Chen Shi Hai v MIMA	2000	201 CLR 293; [2000] HCA 19	Gleeson	10777	Refugee	When laws of general application may be relevant to protection claims
4.	MIMA v Haji Ibrahim	2000	204 CLR 1; [2000] HCA 55	Gleeson	9896	Refugee/Migration	The Convention definition of ‘refugee’ does not encompass those fleeing generalised violence, internal turmoil, or civil war
5.	Minister for Immigration and Ethnic Affairs v Wu Shan Liang	1996	185 CLR 259; [1996] HCA 6	Brennan	9889	Refugee/Migration Administrative	'beneficial construction' when reviewing written reasons of the executive; Merits review versus Judicial review
6.	Briginshaw v Briginshaw	1938	60 CLR 336; [1938] HCA 34	Latham	9538	Civil procedure	(1) The strength of evidence necessary to establish facts on the balance of probabilities, may depend on the nature of what is sought to be proven. (2) Subject to statute, the standard of proof in all civil proceedings is the balance of probabilities.
7.	MIMA v Khawar	2002	210 CLR 1; [2002] HCA 14	Gleeson	9104	Refugee/Migration	On the meaning of 'persecution' and 'particular social group' under the refugee convention
8.	MIEA v Guo	1997	191 CLR 559; [1997] HCA 22	Brennan	8778	Refugee	On the 'rational basis' test for determining whether a refugee applicant has a well founded fear of persecution
9.	Jones v Dunkel	1959	101 CLR 298; [1959] HCA 8	Dixon	7390	Civil procedure	On inferences that may be drawn when a party fails to lead evidence without explanation
10.	Applicant S v MIMA	2004	217 CLR 387; [2004] HCA 25	Gleeson	6830	Refugee/Migration	Meaning of 'particular social group' under the Refugee Convention; When a law of general application may be considered to give rise to discriminatory treatment
11.	Project Blue Sky v Australian Broadcasting Authority	1998	194 CLR 355; [1998] HCA 28	Gleeson	6756	Administrative	
12.	Minister for Aboriginal Affairs v Peko-Wallsend Ltd	1986	162 CLR 24; [1986] HCA 40	Gibbs	5256	Administrative	Known for its statements elaborating upon various Administrative Law doctrines
13.	Fox v Percy	2003	214 CLR 118; [2003] HCA 22	Gleeson	4515	Appeals	On the role of appellate courts, trial judge findings, and assessments of witness demeanor.
14.	Plaintiff S157/2002 v Commonwealth of Australia	2003	211 CLR 476; [2003] HCA 2	Gleeson	4394	Administrative Constitutional	Parliament cannot restrict the availability of constitutional writs.
15.	General Steel Industries Inc v Commissioner for Railways (NSW)	1964	112 CLR 125; [1964] HCA 69	Mason	4302	Civil procedure	On the summary termination of actions
16.	Minister for Immigration and Multicultural Affairs v Yusuf	2001	206 CLR 323; [2001] HCA 30	Gleeson	3994	Refugee/Migration	On the need to provide reasons under s430 of the Migration Act; Jurisdictional error
17.	Craig v South Australia	1995	184 CLR 163; [1995] HCA 58	Brennan	3908	Administrative	Difference between court & tribunal context for jurisdictional error
18.	Kioa v West	1985	159 CLR 550; [1985] HCA 81	Gibbs	3754	Administrative	extended the application of the doctrine of natural justice in administrative decision making.
19.	Codelfa Construction Pty Ltd v State Rail Authority of New South Wales	1982	149 CLR 337; [1982] HCA 24	Gibbs	3748	Contract	Construction of contracts
20.	Aon Risk Services Australia Ltd v Australian National University	2009	258 ALR 14; [2009] HCA 27	French	3726		
21.	Abebe v Commonwealth	1999	197 CLR 510; [1999] HCA 14	Gleeson	3425	Refugee/Migration	Parliament is entitled to limit the jurisdiction of Commonwealth courts, even to the point where a case may only be able to be heard within the High Court's original jurisdiction
22.	Oshlack v Richmond River Council	1998	193 CLR 72; [1998] HCA 11	Gleeson	3352	Cost orders	On the award of costs in public interest litigations
23.	M v R	1994	181 CLR 487; [1994] HCA 63	Mason	3117	Criminal Law	setting aside a jury verdict on the basis that it was unsafe and unsatisfactory.
24.	Minister for Immigration and Citizenship v SZMDS	2010	240 CLR 611; [2010] HCA 16	French	3112	Administrative	A matter on which reasonable minds might differ was not unreasonable or illogical
25.	Appellant S395/2002 v MIMA	2003	216 CLR 473; [2003] HCA 71	Gleeson	3055	Refugee/Migration	The expectation that a person to take reasonable steps to avoid persecutory harm does not include a need to be discreet about sexuality
26.	SZBEL v Minister for Immigration and Multicultural and Indigenous Affairs	2006	228 CLR 152; [2006] HCA 63	Gleeson		Refugee/Migration	Natural justice requires that adverse information which may be determinative of a decision, must be disclosed to applicants
27.	Ebner v Official Trustee in Bankruptcy	2000	205 CLR 337; [2000] HCA 63	Gleeson	2858	Administrative Law	The test for apprehension of bias in Australia is: whether “a fair-minded lay observer might reasonably apprehend that the judge might not bring an impartial mind to the resolution of the question the judge is required to decide"
28.	Re Minister for Immigration and Multicultural Affairs; Ex parte Durairajasingham	2000	168 ALR 407; [2000] HCA 1	Gleeson	2647	Refugee/Migration	
29.	Pearce v R	1998	194 CLR 152; [1998] HCA 57	Gleeson	2517	Criminal	Double jeopardy
30.	Brisbane South Regional Health Authority v Taylor	1996	186 CLR 541; [1996] HCA 25	Brennan	2494		
31.	Norbis v Norbis	1986	161 CLR 513; [1986] HCA 17	Gibbs	2484	Family	On the correct way to divide assets after the conclusion of a relationship
32.	Australian Broadcasting Tribunal v Bond	1990	170 CLR 321; [1990] HCA 33	Mason		Administrative	On the meaning of a 'decision' under the ADJR act
33.	Veen v R (No 2)	1988	164 CLR 465; [1988] HCA 14	Mason		Criminal	Principles that apply when a sentence is imposed by a court
34.	MIMA v Respondents S152/2003	2004	222 CLR 1; [2004] HCA 18	Gleeson		Refugee/Migration	Of precedential value in situations where a refugee visa applicant faces a real fear of harm from a non-state actor. In S152 the applicant's aversion to seeking the protection of Ukraine was held unreasonable
35.	Port of Melbourne Authority v Anshun Pty Ltd	1981	147 CLR 589; [1981] HCA 45	Gibbs	2130	Civil procedure	'Anshun estoppel' doctrine in Australian civil proceedings. The rule estops parties from making novel legal claims, when those claims should have been pursued in an earlier legal proceeding.
36.	Mabo v Queensland (No 2)	1992	175 CLR 1; [1992] HCA 23	Mason	2075	Native title	Overturned the doctrine that Australia was terra nullius and recognised the native title of the Meriam people from the Murray islands in the Torres Strait.
37.	Dinsdale v R	2000	202 CLR 321; [2000] HCA 54	Gleeson	2051	Criminal	Crown criminal appeals; Relevant factors for suspension of sentence; The meaning of 'manifestly inadequate' or 'manifestly excessive' sentences
38.	March v E & MH Stramare Pty Ltd	1991	171 CLR 506; [1991] HCA 12	Mason	2008	Tort law	The conditions required for causation to be established in tort law, the limitations of the "but for" test and the significance of an intervening act by a third party in determining causation
39.	Dey v Victorian Railways Commissioners	1949	78 CLR 62; [1949] HCA 1	Latham	2005		When an action can be thrown out for being frivolous or vexatious
40.	SZBYR v Minister for Immigration and Citizenship	2007	235 ALR 609; [2007] HCA 26	Gleeson	1992	Refugee/Migration	
41.	SZATV v Minister for Immigration and Citizenship	2007	233 CLR 18; [2007] HCA 40	Gleeson	1986	Refugee/Migration	
42.	Toll (FGCT) Pty Ltd v Alphapharm Pty Ltd	2004	219 CLR 165; [2004] HCA 52	Gleeson	1967	Contract	
43.	Coal and Allied Operations Pty Ltd v Australian Industrial Relations Commission	2000	203 CLR 194; [2000] HCA 47	Gleeson	1947		
44.	Minister for Immigration and Multicultural Affairs v Eshetu	1999	197 CLR 611; [1999] HCA 21	Gleeson	1847	Refugee/Migration	
45.	Postiglione v R	1997	189 CLR 295; [1997] HCA 26	Brennan	1776	Criminal	
43.	Re Refugee Review Tribunal; Ex parte Aala	2000	204 CLR 82; [2000] HCA 57	Gleeson	1766	Refugee/Migration	
44.	Attorney-General (NSW) v Quin	1990	170 CLR 1; [1990] HCA 21	Mason	1741	Administrative	Legitimate expectation in Natural Justice and the extent a court can stop government policy
45.	Latoudis v Casey	1990	170 CLR 534; [1990] HCA 59	Mason	1695		
46.	Minister for Immigration and Ethnic Affairs v Teoh	1995	183 CLR 273; [1995] HCA 20	Mason	1676	Administrative Refugee/Migration	the ratification of an international Convention gave rise to a legitimate expectation that the convention would be applied by the Immigration department.
47.	Wyong Shire Council v Shirt	1980	146 CLR 40; [1980] HCA 12	Barwick	1658		
48.	Mill v R	1988	166 CLR 59; [1988] HCA 70	Mason	1640	Criminal	
49.	Stanford v Stanford	2012	247 CLR 108; [2012] HCA 52	French	1635		
50.	Warren v Coombes	1979	142 CLR 531; [1979] HCA 9	Barwick	1624		
51.	Waltons Stores (Interstate) Ltd v Maher	1988	164 CLR 387; [1988] HCA 7	Mason	1621		Equitable doctrines of unconscionability in commercial law
52.	SAAP v Minister for Immigration and Multicultural and Indigenous Affairs	2005	228 CLR 294; [2005] HCA 24	Gleeson	1606	Refugee/Migration	
53.	MRR v GR	2010	240 CLR 461; [2010] HCA 4	French	1604		The meaning of 'best interests of the child' in child separation cases
54.	Wong v R	2001	207 CLR 584; [2001] HCA 64	Gleeson	1575	Criminal	
55.	Lowe v R	1984	154 CLR 606; [1984] HCA 46	Gibbs	1562	Criminal	
56.	Minister for Immigration and Citizenship v Li	2013	249 CLR 332; [2013] HCA 18	French	1560	Refugee/Migration	
57.	SZFDV v MIAC	2007	233 CLR 51; [2007] HCA 41	Gleeson	1551	Refugee/Migration	
58.	Alcan (NT) Alumina Pty Ltd v Commissioner of Territory Revenue	2009	239 CLR 27; [2009] HCA 41	French	1547		
59.	Re Refugee Review Tribunal; Ex parte H	2001	179 ALR 425; [2001] HCA 28	Gleeson	1517	Refugee/Migration	
60.	Hospital Products Ltd v United States Surgical Corporation	1984	156 CLR 41; [1984] HCA 64	Gibbs	1517		
61.	Allesch v Maunz	2000	203 CLR 172; [2000] HCA 40	Gleeson	1510		
62.	Hili v R	2010	242 CLR 520; [2010] HCA 45	French	1502	Criminal	
63.	Coulton v Holcombe	1986	162 CLR 1; [1986] HCA 33	Gibbs	1502		
64.	Gallo v Dawson	1990	93 ALR 479; [1990] HCA 30	Mason	1489		
65.	Markarian v R	2005	228 CLR 357; [2005] HCA 25	Gleeson	1462	Criminal	
66.	Wardley Australia Ltd v Western Australia	1992	175 CLR 514; [1992] HCA 55	Mason	1461		
67.	Queensland v J L Holdings Pty Ltd	1997	189 CLR 146; [1997] HCA 1	Brennan	1448		
68.	Re Minister for Immigration and Multicultural and Indigenous Affairs; Ex parte Lam	2003	214 CLR 1; [2003] HCA 6	Gleeson	1442	Refugee/Migration	
69.	Dietrich v R	1992	177 CLR 292; [1992] HCA 57	Mason	1435	Criminal	Indefinite stays may be granted by courts when an accused lacking legal representation would result in an unfair trial
70.	M v M	1988	166 CLR 69; [1988] HCA 68	Mason	1417	Criminal	
71.	Malec v JC Hutton Pty Ltd	1990	169 CLR 638; [1990] HCA 20	Mason	1402		
73.	Shell Co of Australia Ltd v Esso Standard Oil (Australia) Ltd	1963	109 CLR 407; [1963] HCA 66	Dixon	1379		
74.	Spencer v Commonwealth	2010	241 CLR 118; [2010] HCA 28	French	1364		
75.	Neat Holdings Pty Ltd v Karajan Holdings Pty Ltd	1992	110 CLR 445; [1992] HCA 66	Mason	1357		
76.	Jago v District Court (NSW)	1989	168 CLR 23; [1989] HCA 46	Mason	1354		
77.	Ainsworth v Criminal Justice Commission	1992	175 CLR 564; [1992] HCA 10	Mason	1346		
78.	Stevens v Brodribb Sawmilling Co Pty Ltd	1986	160 CLR 16; [1986] HCA 1	Gibbs	1343		
79.	Minister for Immigration and Citizenship v SZIAI	2009	159 ALR 429; [2009] HCA 39	French	1319	Refugee/Migration	
80.	Minister for Immigration and Multicultural Affairs v SGLB	2004	207 ALR 12; [2004] HCA 32	Gleeson	1313	Refugee/Migration	
81.	Muldrock v R	2011	244 CLR 120; [2011] HCA 39	French	1299	Criminal	
82.	Re Minister for Immigration and Multicultural Affairs; Ex parte Applicant S20/2002	2003	198 ALR 59; [2003] HCA 30	Gleeson	1276	Refugee/Migration	
83.	Singer v Berghouse	1994	181 CLR 291; [1994] HCA 40	Mason	1273		
84.	Lowndes v R	1999	195 CLR 665; [1999] HCA 29	Gleeson	1269	Criminal	
85.	Commercial Bank of Australia Ltd v Amadio	1983	151 CLR 447; [1983] HCA 14	Gibbs	1268	Equity	The meaning of unconscionability in Australian law
86.	R v Olbrich	1999	199 CLR 279; [1999] HCA 54	Gleeson	1267	Criminal	
87.	Stead v State Government Insurance Commission	1986	161 CLR 141; [1986] HCA 54	Gibbs	1253		
88.	Australian Broadcasting Corporation v O'Neill	2006	227 CLR 57; [2006] HCA 46	Gleeson	1248		
89.	Parkdale Custom Built Furniture Pty Ltd v Puxu Pty Ltd	1982	149 CLR 191; [1982] HCA 44	Gibbs	1229		
90.	Farah Constructions Pty Ltd v Say-Dee Pty Ltd	2007	[2007] HCA 22	Gleeson	1225	Unjust enrichment Equity Property Precedent	1. Unjust enrichment is not the doctrinal basis for constructive trust relief under Barnes v Addy; 2. Constructive trust relief is defeated by registration of an interest in the Torrens system 3. Lower courts must obey the 'seriously considered dicta' of a High Court majority 4. Intermediate appellate courts and trial judges in Australia should not depart from other intermediate court decisions, unless they are convinced (it would be) plainly wrong
91.	Williams v Spautz	1992	174 CLR 509; [1992] HCA 34	Mason	1223		
92.	Waterford v Commonwealth	1987	163 CLR 54; [1987] HCA 25	Mason	1197		
93.	Berenguel v Minister for Immigration and Citizenship	2010	264 ALR 417; [2010] HCA 8	French	1193	Refugee/Migration	
94.	Blair v Curran	1939	62 CLR 464; [1939] HCA 23	Latham	1181		
95.	Re JRL; Ex parte CJL	1986	161 CLR 342; [1986] HCA 39	Gibbs	1178		
96.	Gronow v Gronow	1979	114 CLR 513; [1979] HCA 63	Barwick	1174	Family	In child separation cases, there is no principle, presumption, or preference for the parental role of the mother
97.	Adam P Brown Male Fashions Pty Ltd v Philip Morris Inc	1981	148 CLR 170; [1981] HCA 39	Gibbs	1171		
98.	Minister for Immigration and Multicultural Affairs v Bhardwaj	2002	209 CLR 597; [2002] HCA 11	Gleeson	1167	Refugee/Migration	
99.	Commonwealth v Amann Aviation Pty Ltd	1991	174 CLR 64; [1991] HCA 54	Mason	1149		reliance damages for breach of contract
100.	Abalos v Australian Postal Commission	1990	171 CLR 167; [1990] HCA 47	Mason	1132		
101.	Masters v Cameron	1954	91 CLR 353; [1954] HCA 72	Dixon	1120	Contract	Prior verbal contracts may form part of a subsequent formal contract
102.	Gould v Vaggelas	1984	157 CLR 215; [1984] HCA 68	Gibbs	1112		
103.	Livesey v New South Wales Bar Association	1983	151 CLR 288; [1983] HCA 17	Gibbs	1097		
104.	Australian Capital Television Pty Ltd v Commonwealth	1992	117 CLR 106; [1992] HCA 45	Mason	1095		First freedom of political communication case, representative and responsible govt is implied.
105.	Webb v R	1994	181 CLR 41; [1994] HCA 30	Mason	1093	Criminal	
106.	Lange v Australian Broadcasting Corporation	1997	189 CLR 520; [1997] HCA 25	Brennan	1087	Constitutional	Second freedom of political communication case
107.	Muschinski v Dodds	1985	160 CLR 583; [1985] HCA 78	Gibbs	1082		de facto relationship gave rise to a constructive trust
108.	Pacific Carriers Ltd v BNP Paribas	2004	218 CLR 451; [2004] HCA 35	Gleeson	1073		
109.	O'Sullivan v Farrer	1989	168 CLR 210; [1989] HCA 61	Mason	1068		
110.	Yorke v Lucas	1985	158 CLR 661; [1985] HCA 65	Gibbs	1065		
111.	Fancourt v Mercantile Credits Ltd	1983	154 CLR 87; [1983] HCA 25	Gibbs	1045		
112.	Esso Australia Resources Ltd v Federal Commissioner of Taxation	1999	201 CLR 49; [1999] HCA 67	Gleeson	1036	Legal professional privilege	The 'dominant purpose' test is the common law test in Australia for legal professional privilege
113.	Bushel v Repatriation Commission	1992	175 CLR 408; [1992] HCA 47	Mason	1017		
114.	State Rail Authority of New South Wales v Earthline Constructions Pty Ltd (in liq)	1999	160 ALR 588; [1999] HCA 3	Gleeson	1016		
115.	R v Hickman; Ex parte Fox and Clinton	1945	70 CLR 408; [1945] HCA 53	Latham	1015		
116.	Mann v Carnell	1999	201 CLR 1; [1999] HCA 66	Gleeson	1011		
117.	MFA v R	2002	213 CLR 696; [2002] HCA 53	Gleeson	1001	Criminal	
118.	Re Minister for Immigration and Ethnic Affairs; Ex parte Lai Qin	1997	186 CLR 662; [1997] HCA 6	Brennan	1000	Refugee/Migration	
119.	Maxwell v Murphy	1957	96 CLR 261; [1957] HCA 7	Dixon	996		
120.	Hope v Bathurst City Council	1980	144 CLR 1; [1980] HCA 16	Barwick	994		
121.	Pavey & Matthews Pty Ltd v Paul	1987	162 CLR 221; [1987] HCA 5	Mason	988	Unjust enrichment	Unjust enrichment, and awards for restitution in quantum meruit
122.	Australian Woollen Mills Ltd v FS Walton & Co Ltd	1937	58 CLR 641; [1937] HCA 51	Latham	982		
123.	Banque Commerciale SA, En Liquidation v Akhil Holdings Ltd	1990	169 CLR 279; [1990] HCA 11	Mason	978		
124.	Knight v FP Special Assets Ltd	1992	174 CLR 178; [1992] HCA 28	Mason	976		
125.	Mallet v Mallet	1984	156 CLR 605; [1984] HCA 21	Gibbs	964		
126.	Grant v Downs	1976	135 CLR 674; [1976] HCA 63	Barwick	963		
127.	Vakauta v Kelly	1989	167 CLR 568; [1989] HCA 44	Mason	960		
128.	R v De Simoni	1981	147 CLR 383; [1981] HCA 31	Gibbs	944	Criminal	Sentencing judges must not rely on facts implying a more serious crime than the actual conviction
129.	Sankey v Whitlam	1978	142 CLR 1; [1978] HCA 43	Barwick	938	Administrative	Imposed a very narrow view of when a government could claim 'crown privilege'
130.	Shepherd v R	1990	170 CLR 573; [1990] HCA 56	Mason	927	Criminal	
131.	Bunning v Cross	1978	141 CLR 54; [1978] HCA 22	Barwick	920		Accused bears onus of proving evidence was improperly obtained
132.	U v U	2002	211 CLR 238; [2002] HCA 36	Gleeson	916		
133.	Kable v Director of Public Prosecutions (NSW)	1996	189 CLR 51; [1996] HCA 24	Brennan	916	Constitutional	Nature of the judicial power of the Commonwealth, as exercised by State supreme courts; indefinite detention repugnant to judicial power
134.	Australian Broadcasting Corporation v Lenah Game Meats Pty Ltd	2001	208 CLR 119; [2001] HCA 63	Gleeson	908		
135.	Green v R; Quinn v R	2011	244 CLR 462; [2011] HCA 49	French	905	Criminal	
136.	Suttor v Gundowda Pty Ltd	1950	81 CLR 418; [1950] HCA 35	Latham	898		
138.	Chu Kheng Lim v Minister for Immigration, Local government and Ethnic Affairs	1992	176 CLR 1; [1992] HCA 46	Mason	895	Refugee/Migration	
139.	Nationwide News Pty Ltd v Wills	1992	177 CLR 1; [1992] HCA 46	Mason	894	Constitutional	Freedom of Political Communication
140.	Commonwealth v Tasmania	1983	158 CLR 1; [1983] HCA 21	Gibbs	892	Constitutional	Examined the extent of the Commonwealth's external affair power and the corporations power
141.	Sellars v Adelaide Petroleum NL	1994	179 CLR 332; [1994] HCA 4	Mason	887		
142.	Australian Broadcasting Commission v Australasian Performing Right Association Ltd	1973	129 CLR 99; [1973] HCA 36	Barwick	885		
143.							
144.	Bellgrove v Eldridge	1954	90 CLR 613; [1954] HCA 36	Dixon	875		
145.	Australian Coal and Shale Employees' Federation v The Commonwealth	1953	94 CLR 621; [1953] HCA 25	Dixon	875		
146.	Jackamarra v Krakouer	1998	195 CLR 516; [1998] HCA 27	Gleeson	872		
147.	Annetts v McCann	1990	170 CLR 596; [1990] HCA 57	Mason	872		Natural justice requirements for royal commissions
148.	Sutherland Shire Council v Heyman	1985	157 CLR 424; [1985] HCA 41	Gibbs	871		
149.	Longman v R	1989	168 CLR 79; [1989] HCA 60	Mason	869	Criminal	
150.	Edwards v R	1993	178 CLR 193; [1993] HCA 63	Mason	860	Criminal	
	Dalgarno v Hannah	1903	1 CLR 1; [1903] HCA 1	Griffith	54	Constitutional	First case decided by the Court
	Bond v The Commonwealth of Australia	1903	1 CLR 13; [1903] HCA 2	Griffith	16	Constitutional	Priority of constitution over statute
	Chanter v Blackwood & Maloney v McEacharn	1904	1 CLR 39; [1904] HCA 2	Griffith	34		Irregularities only affect the result of an election if the improper votes exceed the majority and official errors were, in sufficient numbers, a ground for making the election void.
	D'Emden v Pedder	1904	1 CLR 91; [1904] HCA 1	Griffith	197	Constitutional	Whether salary receipts of federal government employees were subject to state stamp duty and applied the doctrine of implied intergovernmental immunities.
	Peterswald v Bartley	1904	1 CLR 497; [1904] HCA 21	Griffith	63	Constitutional	Dealt with s90 of the Australian Constitution, which prohibits States from levying excise.
	Municipal Council of Sydney v The Commonwealth	1904	1 CLR 208; [1904] HCA 50	Griffith	86	Constitutional	Held that a municipal rate was a tax imposed by a state agency for the purposes of section 114 of the Constitution.
	Tasmania v The Commonwealth of Australia and Victoria	1904	1 CLR 329	Griffith	80	Constitutional	Concerned the proper approach to the interpretation of the Constitution.
	Deakin v Webb	1904	1 CLR 585	Griffith	73	Constitutional	Held that Alfred Deakin was not liable to pay Victorian income tax on his salary as a member of the Australian House of Representatives.
	Potter v Broken Hill Proprietary Co Ltd	1906	3 CLR 479	Griffith	66		extended the Moçambique rule to hold that the infringement in NSW of a NSW patent was not justiciable in Victoria
	Federated Amalgamated Government Railway and Tramway Service Association v The New South Wales Railway Traffic Employes Association (Railway servants case)	1906	4 CLR 488	Griffith	124	Constitutional	State railways employees could not be part of an interstate industrial dispute under the doctrine of "implied inter-governmental immunities"
	Baxter v Commissioners of Taxation (NSW)	1907	4 CLR 1087	Griffith	149	Constitutional	the Privy Council had no jurisdiction to decide Webb v Outtrim and upheld the doctrine of "implied inter-governmental immunities".
	Blundell v Vardon	1907	4 CLR 1463	Griffith	16	Constitutional	a series of 3 cases concerning the process of electing and appointing senators and the consequences of a void election.
	R v Barger	1908	6 CLR 41	Griffith	148	Constitutional	High Court appeal which overruled the Harvester Judgement
	Jumbunna Coal Mine NL v Victorian Coal Miners’ Association	1908	6 CLR 309	Griffith	437	Constitutional	the registration of Trade Unions was incidental to the conciliation and arbitration power
	Attorney-General for NSW v Brewery Employees Union of NSW (Union Label case)	1908	6 CLR 469	Griffith	280	Constitutional	Applied the reserved powers doctrine and determined the constitutional meaning of trade marks
	R v Commonwealth Court of Conciliation and Arbitration; Ex parte BHP	1909	8 CLR 419	Griffith	53	Constitutional	High Court asserted its power to correct jurisdictional error and in doing so expanded the scope of prohibition beyond the reach it had in English courts
	Federated Sawmill Employees Association v James Moore & Sons Pty Ltd	1909	8 CLR 465	Griffith	53	Constitutional	Federal award could not be inconsistent with a State wages board determination
	Huddart, Parker & Co Ltd v Moorehead	1909	8 CLR 330	Griffith	481	Constitutional	established the classic definition of judicial power and held that the corporations power should be construed narrowly
	Australian Boot Trade Employees' Federation v Whybrow & Co	1910	10 CLR 266	Griffith	47	Constitutional	the conciliation and arbitration power did not permit common rule awards to prevent industrial disputes
	SS Kalibia v Wilson	1910	11 CLR 689	Griffith	109	Constitutional	the extent of the navigation power
	Federated Engine-Drivers and Firemen's Association of Australasia v Broken Hill Proprietary Co Ltd	1911	12 CLR 398	Griffith	189		a union in different industries could not be registered
	Melbourne Steamship Co Ltd v Moorehead	1912	15 CLR 333	Griffith	161	Constitutional	trade & commerce power
	Colonial Sugar Refining Co Ltd v Attorney-General (Cth)	1912	15 CLR 182	Griffith	58		the only case in which the High Court granted a certificate under section 74 of the Constitution to appeal to the Privy Council
	New South Wales v Commonwealth (Wheat or Inter-State Commission case)	1915	20 CLR 54	Griffith	144	Constitutional	Separation of powers for Courts and the Inter-State Commission
	Farey v Burvett	1916	21 CLR 433	Griffith	109	Constitutional	The defence power was paramount such that the reserved powers doctrine did not apply to it
	Waterside Workers' Federation of Australia v J W Alexander Ltd	1918	25 CLR 434	Griffith	291	Constitutional	the Constitution requires lifetime appointments for judges to specific courts
	Amalgamated Society of Engineers v Adelaide Steamship Co. Ltd (Engineers' Case)	1920	28 CLR 129	Knox	774	Constitutional	Rejected the reserved State powers doctrine
	R v Licensing Court of Brisbane; Ex parte Daniell	1920	28 CLR 23	Knox	71		Inconsistency between Commonwealth and State legislation, which is dealt with by s109 of the Australian Constitution
	Re Judiciary and Navigation Acts	1921	29 CLR 257	Knox	528		Dealt with what is a matter for the court and what the court can hear
	Roche v Kronheimer	1921	29 CLR 329	Knox	55		Concluded that Federal Parliament had the power to implement the Treaty of Versailles under the defence power. One view was also under the external affair power
	Melbourne Corporation v Barry	1922	31 CLR 174	Knox	141		Early civil liberties case, striking down a municipal attempt to regulate street marches
	Pirrie v McFarlane	1925	36 CLR 170	Knox	109		Crown immunity case
	British Imperial Oil Co Ltd v Federal Commissioner of Taxation	1925	35 CLR 422	Knox	68		A power of appeal against an income tax assessment was part of the Judicial power of the Commonwealth
	Burwood Cinema Ltd v Australian Theatrical and Amusement Employees' Association	1925	35 CLR 528	Knox	196		Unions are not just agents for their members but can be a party in their own right to an industrial dispute and award
	Clyde Engineering Co Ltd v Cowburn	1926	37 CLR 466	Knox	214		'cover the field' test for inconsistency between a Commonwealth and a State law
	R v Clarke	1927	40 CLR 227	Knox	48		no contract was formed because the offer of a reward was not accepted by Clarke because he did not act to claim the reward, instead he gave information that led to the conviction of a murderer to clear himself of a charge of accessory to that murder
	Federated State School Teachers' Association of Australia v Victoria	1929	41 CLR 569	Knox	61		a state school teacher was not engaged in an industry and so could not be covered by a federal award
	Caledonian Collieries Ltd v Australasian Coal & Shale Employees' Federation (No 1)	1930	42 CLR 527	Knox	80		attempts to arbitrate a management lockout in Hunter Valley coalmines were invalid as the dispute did not "extend beyond the limits of any one State".
	Ex Parte McLean	1930	43 CLR 472	Isaacs	288		the Masters and Servants Act 1902 (NSW) was relevantly invalid as inconsistent with the Commonwealth Pastoral Award, in which Dixon J reformulated the 'cover the field' test established in Clyde Engineering Co Ltd v Cowburn
	Munday v Gill	1930	44 CLR 38	Isaacs	73		in a sequel to the Caledonian Collieries case, 18 miners out of the 6–10,000 who resisted the reopening of the mine were tried together and convicted of unlawful assembly. The majority held that the right to a separate hearing did not apply to summary proceedings for statutory offences
	Hollis v Vabu	1999	207 CLR 21	Gleeson	832	Industrial law	principles determinative of whether a worker should be regarded as an employee or independent contractor
	Australian Railways Union v Victorian Railways Commissioners	1930	44 CLR 319	Isaacs	129		in a precursor to Melbourne Corporation v Commonwealth, Dixon J held that federal legislation could not "discriminate against the States or their agencies."
	Attorney-General (New South Wales) v Trethowan	1931	44 CLR 394	Gavan Duffy	68		considered Premier of New South Wales Jack Lang's attempt to abolish the New South Wales Legislative Council.
	Victorian Stevedoring & General Contracting Co Pty Ltd v Dignan	1931	46 CLR 73	Gavan Duffy	536		the Constitution did not require a strict separation of powers between the executive and the legislature
	New South Wales v Commonwealth (No.1)	1932	46 CLR 155	Gavan Duffy	38		the Commonwealth could validly seize State revenue for the purpose of paying interest on State debts
	Australian Knitting Mills Limited v Grant	1933	50 CLR 387	Gavan Duffy	181		concerned the liability of a manufacturer of woolen underwear to a consumer. The High Court decision was overturned by the Privy Council.
	Tuckiar v The King	1934	52 CLR 335	Gavan Duffy	68		race relations and lawyer duty case.
	R v Carter; ex parte Kisch and R v Wilson; ex parte Kisch (Kisch's case)	1934	52 CLR 234	Gavan Duffy	61	Immigration	a long round of litigation arising from the Lyons' government's attempts to exclude left-wing journalist Egon Kisch from Australia. Found that Scottish Gaelic was not a European language within the meaning of the Immigration Restriction Act 1901 (Cth).
	R v Burgess; Ex parte Henry	1936	55 CLR 608	Latham	177		external affair power extends to implementing treaties
	Victoria Park Racing & Recreation Grounds Co Ltd v Taylor	1937	58 CLR 479	Latham	219	Property	broadcasting rights were not protected as quasi-property
	Matthews v Chicory Marketing Board (Vic)	1938	80 CLR 263	Latham	1		Considered s90 of the Constitution, which prohibits States from levying excise.
	Henwood v Municipal Tramways Trust (SA)	1938	60 CLR 438	Latham	115		the unlawful act of the deceased did not absolve the Trust from civil liability for its negligence.
	Deputy Federal Commissioner of Taxation (NSW) v W R Moran Pty Ltd	1939	61 CLR 735	Latham	89		whether s96 is limited by s99, which prevents Commonwealth laws discriminating between States.
	Proudman v Dayman	1941	67 CLR 536	Latham	355		Developed the doctrine of honest and reasonable mistake of fact as a defence to some criminal matters
	South Australia v Commonwealth (First Uniform Tax case)	1942	65 CLR 373	Latham	248		Commonwealth taxation power was sufficient to impose a scheme of uniform income tax across the country and displace that of the States
	Adelaide Company of Jehovah's Witnesses v Commonwealth (Jehovah's Witnesses case)	1943	67 CLR 116	Latham	168		strict limits to the Constitution's protections for religious freedom
	Silk Bros Pty Ltd v State Electricity Commission (Vict)	1943	67 CLR 1	Latham	104		a power to determine applications by landlords for recovery of premises and providing for the enforcement of the Board's orders were an invalid attempt to confer Judicial power on a body that was not a Federal Court
	Attorney-General (Vic) ex rel Dale v Commonwealth (First Pharmaceutical Benefits case)	1945	71 CLR 237	Latham	143		considered whether expenditure under the appropriations power had to be supported by another head of legislative power, however there was no clear ratio decidendi
	Australian National Airways Pty Ltd v Commonwealth (No 1)	1945	71 CLR 29	Latham	189		the Commonwealth could own an airline, but it could not hinder private sector competition with that airline
	Melbourne Corporation v Commonwealth (Melbourne Corporation case)	1947	74 CLR 31	Latham	402		limits to Commonwealth legislative power implied from federal nature of Constitution.
	In Re Davis	1947	75 CLR 409	Latham	338		Regarding the admission of legal practitioners and the jurisdiction of courts over barristers
	O'Keefe v Calwell	1948	77 CLR 261	Latham	69		Regarding the deportation of war time evacuees
	Bank of New South Wales v Commonwealth (Bank Nationalisation case)	1948	76 CLR 1	Latham	679		striking down of an attempt to nationalise the banks, (Later affirmed by the Privy Council in Commonwealth v Bank of New South Wales)
	Parton v Milk Board (Vic)	1949	80 CLR 229	Latham	87		Dealt with the meaning of excise in relation to s90 of the Constitution.
	P J Magennis Pty Ltd v Commonwealth	1949	80 CLR 382	Latham	107		Commonwealth's power of acquisition of property, which must be on just terms, as specified in section 51(xxxi) of the Constitution.
	British Medical Association v Commonwealth (Second Pharmaceutical Benefits case)	1949	79 CLR 201	Latham	133		Held the Pharmaceutical Benefits Act 1947 was invalid as authorising a form of civil conscription. Settled the construction of section 81 of the constitution that expenditure had to be supported by another head of legislative power.
	Australian Communist Party v Commonwealth (Communist Party case)	1951	83 CLR 1	Latham	606		declared the Communist Party Dissolution Act 1950 (Cth) unconstitutional and invalid based on Parliament's inability to exercise a given power in the peacetime context of the Act.
	McRae v Commonwealth Disposals Commission	1951	84 CLR 377	Latham	243		equal knowledge was required for a contract to be void for common mistake
	Pye v Renshaw	1951	84 CLR 58	Latham	64		NSW legislation for the resumption of land that was not required to be funded under s 96 of the Constitution was not subject to the restriction in s 51(xxxi) that the acquisition of property be on just terms
	Australian Woollen Mills Pty Ltd v Commonwealth	1954	92 CLR 424	Dixon	175	Contract	a statement on government policy was not a legally binding offer capable of acceptance
	O'Sullivan v Noarlunga Meat Ltd	1954	92 CLR 565	Dixon	108		Scope of the trade and commerce power, under s51
	R v Davison	1954	90 CLR 353	Dixon	292		a registrar was not an officer of the Bankruptcy Court and a legislative attempt to confer upon a registrar the power of making a judicial order was void
	Masters v Cameron	1954	91 CLR 353	Dixon	1120		set out the possibilities when parties enter into an agreement, however that is yet to have been formalised in a more intricate agreement
	Mace v Murray	1955	92 CLR 370	Dixon	161		an appeal against a discretionary decision can only succeed if the appeal court reaches a clear conclusion that the primary judge has failed to properly exercise the discretion
	R v Kirby; Ex parte Boilermakers' Society of Australia	1956	94 CLR 254	Dixon	639		cornerstone decision confirming the separation of judicial and executive powers of the Commonwealth
	O'Sullivan v Noarlunga Meat Ltd (No 2)	1956	94 CLR 367	Dixon	13		refused to issue a certificate for leave to appeal to the Privy Council against the previous decision of O'Sullivan v Noarlunga Meat Ltd
	Victoria v Commonwealth (Second Uniform Tax case)	1957	99 CLR 575	Dixon	138		
	Dennis Hotels Pty Ltd v Victoria	1960	104 CLR 529	Dixon	95		Deals with s90 of the constitution, which prohibits States from levying export duties
	Aston v Harlee Manufacturing Co	1960	103 CLR 391	Dixon	328		a person register a trade mark in Australia even if it is used by someone else in a foreign country & not in Australia
	Swift Australian Co (Pty) Ltd v Boyd Parkinson	1962	108 CLR 189	Dixon	28		Regarding the scope of the trade and commerce power in s51(i) of the Constitution
	Bolton v Madsen	1963	110 CLR 264	Dixon	36		s90 of the Constitution, which prohibits States from levying excise duty
	Redfern v Dunlop Rubber Australia Ltd	1964	110 CLR 194	Dixon	35		Regarding the scope of the trade and commerce power in s51(i) of the Constitution
	Anderson's Pty Ltd v Victoria	1964	111 CLR 353	Dixon	29		s90 of the Constitution
	Fairfax v Commissioner of Taxation	1965	114 CLR 1	Barwick	106		scope of the taxation power
	Airlines of New South Wales Pty Ltd v New South Wales (No 2)	1965	113 CLR 54	Barwick	129		validity of Commonwealth regulations about intrastate air navigation
	Latec Investments Ltd v Hotel Terrigal Pty Ltd	1965	113 CLR 265	Barwick	231		discussion of the principles upon which the priority of competing equitable interests in land is to be determined
	Beaudesert Shire Council v Smith	1966	120 CLR 145	Barwick	112		a person who suffers loss because of the unlawful, intentional and positive acts of another, can recover damages independently of trespass, negligence or nuisance
	Beecham Group Ltd v Bristol Laboratories Pty Ltd	1968	118 CLR 618	Barwick	848		there must be a prima facie case before the court will grant an interlocutory injunction
	Pacific Film Laboratories v Commissioner of Tax	1970	121 CLR 154	Barwick	45		defined copyright
	Strickland v Rocla Concrete Pipes Ltd (Concrete Pipes case)	1971	124 CLR 468	Barwick	-	Constitutional	landmark Trade Practices Act 1974 (Cth) case
	Victoria v Commonwealth (1971)	1971	122 CLR 353	Barwick	261		scope of the Commonwealth's taxation power and the extent to which it can burden a state's structural integrity
	Breskvar v Wall	1972	126 CLR 376	Barwick	-		influential decision in Property Law, specifically in which equitable interests take priority
	King v Jones	1972	128 CLR 221	Barwick	56		considered the nature of section 41 of the Australian Constitution
	Dickenson's Arcade Pty Ltd v Tasmania	1974	130 CLR 177	Barwick	-		s90 of the Constitution
	R v Joske; Ex parte Australian Building Construction Employees and Builders' Labourers' Federation	1974	130 CLR 87	Barwick	57		non-judicial powers such as reorganising unions and invalidating union rules were allowed to be exercised by a Chapter III court
	Cormack v Cope	1974	131 CLR 432	Barwick	89		Constitutional validity of the Joint Sitting of the Australian Parliament of 1974
	Victoria v Commonwealth (Petroleum and Minerals Authority Act Case)	1975	134 CLR 81	Barwick	202		The passage of the Petroleum and Minerals Authority Act 1973 at the Joint Sitting of the Australian Parliament of 1974 was invalid as there had not been 3 months between the Senate failing to pass the bill and the House of Representatives passing it a second time.
	Western Australia v Commonwealth (First Territory Senators' Case)	1975	134 CLR 201	Barwick	202		Validity of various electoral acts passed by the Joint Sitting of the Australian Parliament of 1974 including representation for the Northern Territory and Australian Capital Territory in the Senate.
	New South Wales v Commonwealth ('Seas and Submerged Lands case)	1975	135 CLR 337	Barwick	318		Sovereignty over the continental shelf.
	Murphyores Inc Pty Ltd v Commonwealth	1976	136 CLR 1	Barwick	257		prevention of activity within a grant of legislative power
	Caltex Oil (Australia) Pty Ltd v Dredge "Willemstad"	1976	136 CLR 529	Barwick	392		pure economic loss was recoverable because the defendants knew or should have known that Caltex would suffer it.
	Mullens v Federal Commissioner of Taxation	1976	135 CLR 290	Barwick	53		Tax deductions for monies subscribed to a petroleum exploration company
	Cridland v Federal Commissioner of Taxation	1977	140 CLR 330	Barwick	54		Tax scheme whereby university students became primary producers
	Slutzkin v Federal Commissioner of Taxation	1977	140 CLR 314	Barwick	-		Concerning the tax position of company owners who sold to a dividend stripping operation
	Queensland v Commonwealth (1977) (Second Territory Senators' Case)	1977	139 CLR 585	Barwick	225		the validity of full representation for the Northern Territory and Australian Capital Territory in the Parliament
	Sankey v Whitlam	1978	142 CLR 1	Barwick	938		extent of 'crown privilege'
	Gronow v Gronow	1979	144 CLR 513	Barwick	1174		the preferred role of the mother was not a principle, presumption nor preference
	R v Federal Court of Australia; Ex parte W.A. National Football League	1979	143 CLR 190	Barwick	345		Aka Adamson's Case Decided that a "trading and financial" corporation (a pl.(xx) entity) could be more than just a corporation set up for the purpose of trade, as long as its current revenue included a significant proportion of trading activities
	Attorney-General (Vic); Ex Rel Black v Commonwealth DOGS case	1981	146 CLR 559	Gibbs	28		confirmed the wide interpretation of s 96 of the Constitution.
	Shaddock & Associates Pty Ltd v Parramatta City Council (No 1)	1981	150 CLR 225	Gibbs	294		the court decided to adopt the High Court ruling in Mutual Life & Citizens' Assurance Co. Ltd. v. Evatt (1968) over the Privy Council decision which overruled the High Court. This re-affirmed the broad approach taken to statements of negligent misrepresentation.
	Koowarta v Bjelke-Petersen	1982	153 CLR 168	Gibbs	492		the constitutional validity of the Racial Discrimination Act 1975 (Cth)
	Actors and Announcers Equity Association v. Fontana Films Pty Ltd	1982	150 CLR 169	Gibbs	213		extent of corporations power
	Legione v Hatley	1983	152 CLR 406	Gibbs	839		the adoption of promissory estoppel into Australian law
	R v Pearson; Ex parte Sipka	1983	152 CLR 254	Gibbs	61		found that there is no constitutional right to vote in Australia
	New South Wales v Commonwealth (1983)	1983	151 CLR 302	Gibbs	31		Hospital Benefits Fund Case
	Fencott v Muller	1983	152 CLR 570	Gibbs	721		extent of corporations power
	R v Coldham; Ex parte Australian Social Welfare Union	1983	153 CLR 297	Gibbs	165		overturned the Schoolteacher's case and held that social workers could be a party to an industrial dispute
	Hematite Petroleum Pty Ltd v Victoria	1983	151 CLR 599	Gibbs	75		s90 of the Constitution
	Chamberlain v The Queen	1984	153 CLR 521	Gibbs	810		unsuccessful challenge by Lindy Chamberlain to her conviction for murder of her daughter Azaria
	A v Hayden	1984	156 CLR 532	Gibbs	230		
	Kirmani v Captain Cook Cruises Pty Ltd (No 2)	1985	159 CLR 461	Gibbs	27		refused an application for certificate to appeal to Privy Council, stating the power "has long since been spent"
	He Kaw Teh v R	1985	157 CLR 523	Gibbs	734		Strict liability / Moral culpability issues in importing prohibited imports.
	Hilton v Wells	1985	157 CLR 57	Gibbs	159		
	Australasian Meat Industry Employees Union v Mudginberri Station	1986	161 CLR 98; [1986] HCA 46	Gibbs	465		case arising from the Mudginberri dispute
	Williams v The Queen	1986	[1986] HCA 88	Gibbs	299		Admission of evidence
	Computer Edge v Apple	1986		Gibbs	-		Copyright in computer software
	Pavey & Matthews Pty Ltd v Paul	1987		Gibbs	-		unjust enrichment and restitution for quantum meruit
	Re Cram; Ex parte New South Wales Colliery Proprietors' Association Ltd	1987		Mason	-		held that matters of managerial prerogative could be the subject of an industrial dispute
	Nile v Wood	1987		Mason	-		disqualification from election under section 44 of the Constitution is not simply for the conviction of an offence, but the person must be serving a sentence of imprisonment for one year or more.
	Re Ranger Uranium Mines Pty Ltd; Ex parte FMWUA	1987		Mason	-		existing employees could create an industrial dispute for the reinstatement of a former employee who was unfairly dismissed.
	Richardson v Forestry Commission of Tasmania	1988		Mason	-		applied external affair power following Tasmanian Dams Case.
	Cole v Whitfield	1988		Mason	-		Resolved s92 Jurisprudence
	Re Wood	1988		Mason	-		Wood's election as a Senator was invalid as he was not an Australian citizen at the time
	Bath v Alston Holdings Pty Ltd	1988		Mason	-		application of the freedom of interstate trade, as specified in s92 of the Constitution
	Trident General Insurance v McNiece	1988		Mason	-		
	Air Caledonie v Commonwealth	1988		Mason	-		Provides guidance as to the constitutional definition of a tax
	Mabo v Queensland (No 1)	1988		Mason	-		held that Australian governments were not able to abolish native title rights arbitrarily
	Re Tracey; Ex parte Ryan	1989		Mason	-		the defence power in s 51(vi) of the Constitution conferred power on the Parliament to enact a scheme of military discipline, including rules for the trial and punishment of offences, lying outside Chapter III.
	New South Wales v Commonwealth (1990)	1990		Mason	-		whether the Commonwealth had the power to legislate for the formation of companies
	Castlemaine Tooheys Ltd v South Australia	1990		Mason	-		Freedom of interstate trade
	Bropho v Western Australia	1990		Mason	-		refused to follow the Privy Council in relation to the law of Crown immunity, holding that it required ascertaining the intention of the Parliament
	Barley Marketing Board (NSW) v Norman	1990		Mason	-		question of whether State-run marketing boards are permissible under s92 of the Constitution
	Commonwealth v Verwayen	1990		Mason	-		leading case about estoppel
	Polyukhovich v Commonwealth (War Crimes Act case)	1991		Mason	-		validity of the War Crimes Act 1945 (Cth)
	Harris v Caladine	1991		Mason	-		judicial power may be given to a non-judicial agent provided the judges still bear the major responsibility for exercise of the power and the exercise of power is subject to court review.
	Re Nolan; Ex Parte Young	1991		Mason	-		a law to punish defence members and defence civilians for their conduct was a valid exercise of the defence power in s 51(vi) of the Constitution.
	Louth v Diprose	1992		Mason	-		unconscionable conduct
	Sykes v Cleary	1992		Mason	-		A teacher in the Victorian state system on leave without pay had his election invalidated under subsection 44(i) of the Constitution as he was acting in an office for profit under the crown.
	Rogers v Whitaker	1992		Mason	-		Duty of a Medical practitioner to inform a patient of the possibility of adverse effect of proposed surgery prior to obtaining consent.
	Secretary of the Department of Health and Community Services v JWB and SMB (Marion's case)	1992		Mason	-		looking at the capacity for children and parents to make decisions about the child's welfare – and when only a court order will provide proper consent.
	Leeth v Commonwealth	1992		Mason	-		implied right of legal equality in the Constitution
	Cheatle v The Queen	1993		Mason	-		nature of constitutional guarantee for trial by jury where Commonwealth judicial power exercised by state courts
	Baltic Shipping Company v Dillon	1993		Mason	-		incorporation of exclusion clauses and damages for breach of contract or restitution for unjust enrichment
	Black v The Queen	1993		Mason	-		directions to a jury
	Australian Tape Manufacturers Association Ltd v Commonwealth	1993		Mason	-		Provides guidance as to the constitutional definition of a tax
	Northern Suburbs General Cemetery Reserve Trust v Commonwealth	1993		Mason	-		Case that considered the scope of the taxation power
	Federal Commissioner of Taxation v Peabody	1994		Mason	-		The ATO sought to apply anti-avoidance provisions of the Income Tax Assessment Act 1936 (Cth)
	Burnie Port Authority v General Jones Pty Ltd	1994		Mason	-		tort law case which abolished the rule in Rylands v. Fletcher
	Theophanous v Herald & Weekly Times Ltd	1994		Mason	-		implied freedom of political communication case
	Re Tyler; Ex parte Foley	1994		Mason	-		if the Constitution required a service tribunal exercising disciplinary powers to be independent, a general court martial constituted under the Defence Force Discipline Act met those requirements.
	Brandy v Human Rights and Equal Opportunity Commission	1995		Mason	-		HREOC could not exercise judicial power.
	Western Australia v Commonwealth	1995		Mason	-		the Native Title Act (Cth) was a valid exercise of the race power and an inconsistent WA Act was invalid.
	Re Australian Education Union	1995		Mason	-		intergovernmental immunities in relation to the Constitution.
	Northern Territory v Mengel	1995		Mason	-		overturned its earlier decision in Beaudesert Shire Council v Smith, and that tort liability required either negligence or an intention to harm
	Byrne v Australian Airlines	1995		Brennan	-		test for implied terms in relation to an industrial award
	Grollo v Palmer	1995			-		
	Langer v Commonwealth	1996			-		full preferential voting was a valid method by which members of parliament were directly chosen by the people
	Wik Peoples v Queensland	1996			-	Native title	
	McGinty v Western Australia	1996			-		malapportionment of state electorates
	Victoria v Commonwealth (Industrial Relations Act case)	1996			-		examination of various constitutional bases for 1993 amendments to Industrial Relations Act 1988 (Cth)
	Leask v Commonwealth	1996			-		role of proportionality in the Constitution
	Wilson v Minister for Aboriginal & Torres Strait Islander Affairs	1996	189 CLR 1; 1996 HCA 18		-		Hindmarsh Island bridge controversy
	Levy v Victoria	1997	1997 HCA 31		-		Freedom of Political Communication
	Ha v New South Wales	1997			-		the court invalidated a New South Wales tobacco licensing scheme, reining in the licensing scheme exception to the prohibition states levying excise duties, contained in section 90 of the Australian Constitution
	Kruger v Commonwealth	1997			-		stolen generations case
	CSR v Cigna Insurance	1997			-		rules for granting of anti-suit injunctions
	Esanda Finance Corporation Ltd v Peat Marwick Hungerfords	1997			-		liability of auditors to third parties
	Henderson v Defence Housing Authority (1997)	1997			-		
	Kartinyeri v The Commonwealth	1998		Gleeson	-		2nd Hindmarsh Island Bridge Case the amended s.51(xxvi) of the Constitution did not restrict the Commonwealth parliament to making laws for the benefit of the "Aboriginal race".
	Patrick Stevedores Operations No 2 Pty Ltd v Maritime Union of Australia	1998		Gleeson	-		waterfront dispute case
	Gould v Brown	1998		Gleeson	-		unsuccessful challenge to cross-vesting scheme (precursor to Re Wakim)
	Garcia v National Australia Bank	1998		Gleeson	-		Determined the circumstances under which it is unconscionable for a lender to enforce a transaction against a wife
	Bathurst City Council v PWC Properties Pty Ltd	1998		Gleeson	-		involved Council-owned land that was being used as a public car park
	Egan v Willis	1998		Gleeson	-		Justiciability of legislative powers by courts
	Re Wakim; Ex parte McNally	1999		Gleeson	-		invalidation of part of the cross-vesting of jurisdiction scheme
	Sue v Hill	1999		Gleeson	-		British citizens are citizens of a 'foreign power'
	Bond v The Queen	2000		Gleeson	-		decision relating to the power of the federal prosecutor to institute appeals in state courts.
	R v Hughes	2000		Gleeson	-		power of federal officers to enforce state laws
	Truth About Motorways	2000		Gleeson	-		standing under Trade Practices Act 1974 (Cth)
	Airservices Australia v Canadian Airlines International Ltd	2000		Gleeson	-		Affirms previous High Court definitions of a tax
	Ebner v Official Trustee in Bankruptcy	2000		Gleeson	-		
	CFMEU v Australian Industrial Relations Commission (private arbitration case)	2001		Gleeson	-		a dispute settlement clause in the Gordonstone coal certified agreement created a power of private arbitration, not the exercise of the judicial power of the Commonwealth.
	Pilmer v Duke Group Ltd (in liq)	2001		Gleeson	-		whether a contract gives rise to fiduciary duties is always a matter of construction.
	Roxborough v Rothmans of Pall Mall Australia Ltd	2001		Gleeson	-		a tobacco wholesaler was unjustly enriched by retaining tobacco fees collected from the retailer that had been struck down by the High Court as an excise.
	Commonwealth v Yarmirr	2001		Gleeson	-		native title rights over the sea were inconsistent with the public rights of navigation and fishing
	ABC v Lenah Game Meats	2001		Gleeson	-		the purpose of an interlocutory injunction is to preserve identifiable legal or equitable rights
	R v Carroll	2002		Gleeson	-		double jeopardy issue
	Dow Jones & Co Inc v Gutnick	2002		Gleeson	-		where material was published on the internet, a defamation suit could be brought where the plaintiff had his primary residence and where he was best known.
	Luton v Lessels	2002		Gleeson	-		Affirms previous High Court definitions of a tax.
	Members of the Yorta Yorta Aboriginal Community v Victoria	2002		Gleeson	-		affirmed a finding by the trial judge that the 'tide of history' had 'washed away' any real acknowledgement of traditional laws and any real observance of traditional customs by the applicants.
	Western Australia v Ward	2002		Gleeson	-		native title is a bundle of rights, which may be extinguished one by one, for example, by a mining lease
	Ermogenous v Greek Orthodox Community of SA Inc	2002		Gleeson	-		whether the engagement of a minister of religion was a contract, in which the Court was critical of the language of presumptions as to intention to create a legal relationship.
	Neat Domestic Training Pty Ltd v AWB Ltd	2003		Gleeson	-		ambit of administrative law in the case of commercialised state corporations
	Cattanach v Melchior	2003		Gleeson	-		medical negligence – a doctor forced to pay upkeep of a child born as a result of his negligence
	Plaintiff S157/2002 v Commonwealth	2003		Gleeson	-		the Migration Act did not seek to exclude the jurisdiction of the High Court pursuant to section 75(v) of the Constitution.
	Re MUA; Ex parte CSL Pacific Shipping Inc	2003		Gleeson	-		the Australian Industrial Relations Commission could validly make an award covering a foreign company operating a foreign flagged vessel with a foreign crew while the ship was trading in Australian waters, pursuant to the trade and commerce power.
	Austin v Commonwealth	2003		Gleeson	-		Case that deals with issues of intergovernmental immunity and discrimination of states against Commonwealth power.
	Al-Kateb v Godwin	2004		Gleeson	-		considered the legality of indefinite immigration detention
	Behrooz v Secretary of the Department of Immigration and Multicultural and Indigenous Affairs	2004		Gleeson	-		harsh conditions of immigration detention do not render the detention unlawful.
	Re Aird; Ex parte Alpert	2004		Gleeson	-		the Defence Force Discipline Act, which permitted a trial by general court martial, was a valid exercise of the defence power in s 51(vi) of the Constitution.
	Electrolux v AWU	2004		Gleeson	-		under the Workplace Relations Act 1996 (Cth) industrial action and certified agreements could only be about matters pertaining to the employment relationship.
	Fardon v Attorney-General (Qld)	2004		Gleeson	-		Regarding the separation of powers.
	Coleman v Power	2004		Gleeson	-		Deals with the implied right to freedom of political communication found in the Australian Constitution.
	Combet v Commonwealth	2005		Gleeson	-		challenge against Federal Government's use of public funds to advertise Workchoices
	Stevens V Kabushiki Kaisha Sony Computer Entertainment	2005		Gleeson	-		first case in Australia to define the "anti-circumvention" provisions of the Digital Agenda Act 2000 (Cth)
	Fish v Solution 6 Holdings Limited	2006		Gleeson	-		the privative provisions of a NSW Act did not prevent the Court of Appeal from issuing prerogative relief for jurisdictional error.
	Harriton v Stephens	2006		Gleeson	-		medical negligence – consideration of whether damages could be awarded where claim of "wrongful life"
	New South Wales v Commonwealth (Workplace Relations case)	2006		Gleeson	-		considered the constitutional validity of WorkChoices, in the context of the Commonwealth's corporations and industrial relations powers.
	New South Wales v Fahy	2007		Gleeson	-		workplace negligence – whether to override the existing test for breach of duty of care in Australia.
	Roach v Electoral Commissioner	2007		Gleeson	-		Whether laws disenfranchising all prisoners were constitutional
	Thomas v Mowbray	2007		Gleeson	-		Whether "interim control orders" were constitutional
	Farah Constructions Pty Ltd v Say-Dee Pty Ltd	2007		Gleeson	-		Fiduciary duties; contains obiter dicta pertaining to many areas of the law of Equity
	White v Director of Military Prosecutions	2007		Gleeson	-		the administration of military justice under the Discipline Act was not an exercise of the judicial power of the Commonwealth.
	Australian Competition and Consumer Commission v Baxter Healthcare	2007		Gleeson	-		Derivative Crown immunity from statutes – whether a government contractor is bound by the Trade Practices Act 1974 (Cth) in its commercial dealings with the Crown.
	Betfair Pty Limited v Western Australia	2008		Gleeson	-		determined whether a series of amendments made by the Western Australian government to prohibit the operation of betting exchanges amounted to discriminatory burdens of a protectionist kind.
	R v Tang	2008		Gleeson	-		significant slavery prosecution
	Northern Territory of Australia v Arnhem Land Aboriginal Land Trust (Blue Mud Bay case)	2008		Gleeson	-		native title to waters over land
	Cesan v The Queen	2008		French	-		there was a miscarriage of justice in the conviction of two men for drug trafficking where the trial judge was asleep during parts of the trial.
	Pape v The Commissioner of Taxation of the Commonwealth of Australia	2009		French	-		the Rudd government's tax bonuses were constitutionally valid.
	Lane v Morrison	2009		French	-		The Australian Military Court was an invalid attempt to exercise the judicial power of the Commonwealth because its members did not enjoy the tenure required by s 72 of the Constitution.
	Kirk v Industrial Court of NSW	2010		French	-		State Parliaments cannot prevent State Supreme Courts from issuing prerogative relief for jurisdictional error.
	South Australia v Totani	2010		French	-		South Australian Bikie laws and freedom of association case: A State could not validly impair one of the defining characteristics of a court.
	Rowe v Electoral Commissioner	2010		French	-		Commonwealth legislation invalidly sought to restrict the time in which a person may seek to enroll in an election or alter their enrollment details after the writs for 2010 Australian federal election had been issued.
	Plaintiff M61/2010E v Commonwealth	2010		French	-		The minister was required to afford procedural fairness to applicants for refugee status who were assessed as part of an "offshore processing regime"
	Telstra Corporation Ltd v Commonwealth	2010		French	-		the operation of the access regime to the copper telecommunications network did not result in an acquisition of property on unjust terms
	Plaintiff M70/2011 v Minister for Immigration and Citizenship	2010		French	-		The Malaysia Solution case: refugees can not be deported to nations which are not legally bound to ensure various safeties for those refugees.
	Wainohu v New South Wales	2011		French	-		Non-judicial functions conferred upon judges of the Supreme Court of NSW were incompatible with institutional integrity of the Court
	Haskins v The Commonwealth	2011		French	-		the Military Justice (Interim Measures) Act was a valid exercise of the defence power and provided lawful authority justifying the detention of the plaintiff.
	JT International SA v Commonwealth	2011		French	-		rejected the Tobacco companies challenge to the Commonwealth's plain tobacco packaging laws, claiming their trademark property had been illegally acquired without compensation.
	Wotton v Queensland	2012		French	-		a gag order applying to all prisoners and parolees was a legitimate burden on freedom of political communication.
	Williams v Commonwealth	2012		French	-		School Chaplins case: The funding for school chaplins was not a valid use of prerogative powers for the executive under s61 of the constitution.
	Bendigo Regional Institute of TAFE v Barclay	2012		French	-	Industrial Law	held the employer did not act for a prohibited reason when it suspended a union delegate over an inflammatory email.
	Betfair Pty Limited v Racing New South Wales	2012		French	-		a fee to access race field information had no discriminatory or protectionist effect on interstate trade and did not infringe s 92 of the Constitution.
	Kakavas v Crown Melbourne Ltd	2013		French	-		A casino did not owe a duty of care to gamblers.
	Monis v The Queen	2013		French	-		a split decision on whether the implied freedom of political communication protected the sending of offensive messages by post.
	Akiba v Commonwealth (2013)	2013		French	-		held that native title rights at sea were not extinguished by legislation for fishing licences and third party rights of a personal character dependent upon status were not rights in relation to the waters.
	Commonwealth v ACT (Same-sex marriage case)	2014		French	-		The Marriage Equality Act 2013 (ACT) was invalid as inconsistent with the Marriage Act 1961 (Cth)
	Commonwealth Bank of Australia v Barker	2014		French	-		there is no implied term in contracts of employment in Australia imposing a mutual duty of trust and confidence.
	Williams v Commonwealth (No 2)	2014		French	-		2nd School Chaplins case: The legislation for funding for school chaplins was invalid as it extended beyond the scope of Parliament's power under the Constitution.
	CFMEU v BHP Coal Pty Ltd	2014		French	-		held the employer did not act for a prohibited reason when it dismissed a union member who held up a scab sign during a union protest.
	Queensland v Congoo	2015	[2015] HCA 17	French	-		split decision on whether a temporary military occupation of the Bar Barrum people's land during World War Two permanently extinguished their native title
	McCloy v New South Wales	2015	[2015] HCA 34	French	-		In reference to the Provisions of Election Funding, Expenditure and Disclosures Act 1981 (NSW) on whether the states have the power to forbid groups such as Property Developers from making Political Donations during an Election Cycle and whether it restricts Freedom of Political Association. The court found that states do have that power and it does not infringe on freedoms in the Constitution.
	D'Arcy v Myriad Genetics Inc	2015		French	-		human genes are not a 'patentable invention' for the purposes of the Patents Act 1900 (Cth).
	Attwells v Jackson Lalic Lawyers Pty Ltd	2016		French	-		advice given by an advocate out of court that led to consent orders made by the court was not subject to the advocate's immunity from suit.
	Day v Australian Electoral Officer for SA	2016		French	-		upheld the 2016 Senate voting changes as both above the line and below the line voting were constitutionally valid methods for the people to choose their Senators.
	Murphy v Electoral Commissioner	2016	[2016] HCA 36	French	-		held that closing the electoral rolls 7 days after the issuing of writs was not a burden on the requirement that members of Parliament be directly chosen by the people.
	Cunningham v Commonwealth	2016	[2016] HCA 39	French	-		changes to the retiring allowances and life Gold Pass for retired members of Parliament were not an acquisition of property otherwise than on just terms.
	Re Culleton (No 2)	2017		Kiefel	-		Rod Culleton was incapable of being chosen as a senator as he was subjected to be sentenced at the time of his election, despite the conviction subsequently being annulled.
	Re Day (No 2)	2017		Kiefel	-		Bob Day was disqualified from sitting as a senator as he had an interest in an agreement with the crown.
	Wilkie v Commonwealth	2017		Kiefel	-		expenditure for the Australian Marriage Law Postal Survey had been approved by Parliament and was the collection of "statistical information" that could be conducted by the ABS.
	Brown v Tasmania	2017		Kiefel	-		provisions of the Tasmanian Protesters Act were unconstitutional since they excessively burdened the implied constitutional right of political communication.
	Re Canavan	2017		Kiefel	-		the Citizenship seven case (2017): followed Sykes v Cleary holding that the fact of dual citizenship was disqualifying, regardless of whether the person knew of the citizenship or took any voluntary act.
	Re Nash (No 2)	2017		Kiefel	-		the words "incapable of being chosen" refer to a process of being chosen that does not end on polling day; the process continues until such time as the result of the election is declared which, in the case of a vacancy arising under s 44 of the Constitution, cannot be until the places elected are filled by the qualified candidates.
	Alley v Gillespie	2018		Kiefel	-		section 46 of the Constitution and the displacing legislation cannot be read as conferring on the High Court the power to determine the eligibility of a member of parliament; that power is conferred on the relevant House of Parliament or the Court of Disputed Returns acting pursuant to a referral under the Commonwealth Electoral Act.
	Unions NSW v New South Wales	2019	[2019] HCA 1	Kiefel	-		section 29 (10) of the Electoral Funding Act 2018 (NSW), halving the permitted third-party political donation expense limit during elections, was unconstitutional since it impermissibly burdens the implied constitutional right of political communication.
	ASIC v Kobelt	2019		Kiefel	-		What constituted 'unconscionable conduct in connection with financial services'
	Comcare v Banerji	2019		Kiefel	-		The sacking of a federal public servant for making anonymous political comments on social media did not breach the implied constitutional right of political communication.
	Love v Commonwealth; Thoms v Commonwealth	2020		Kiefel	-		Aboriginal Australians are not within the reach of the Commonwealth's power to make laws with respect to aliens, and therefore cannot be deported.
	Pell v The Queen	2020		Kiefel	-		Acquittal ordersed on the basis that the jury, acting rationally on the whole of the evidence, ought to have entertained a doubt as to Cardinal George Pell's guilt.
	Smethurst v Commissioner of Police	2020		Kiefel	-		An invalid warrant was not a sufficient basis for an injunction to return information to a journalist who did not have a legally-protected right or interest in that information.
	Berry v CCL Secure Ltd	2020		Kiefel	-		Assessment of damages for deliberately deceptive conduct.
	Lewis v ACT	2020		Kiefel	-		Vindicatory damages are not recognised as a distinct form of common law damages in Australia.
	Commonwealth v Introvigne	1982		Gibbs	201	Tort Law	Duty of care of a school for its pupils is non-delegable
	R v Brislan	1935	HCA 78; (1935) 54 CLR 262	Latham		Constitutional	"Other like powers" in s51(v) of Constitution included radio as it was a wireless service.
	Bryant & v Badenoch Integrated Logging Pty Ltd						
	Fair Work Ombudsman v Quest South Perth	2015	[2015] HCA 45]	Keifel		Labour law	The High Court of Australia found that Quest South Perth had contravened section 357 of the Fair Work Act 2009.

== See also ==
- List of Privy Council cases
- List of Court of Disputed Returns cases
- List of Federal Court of Australia cases
- List of Australian Supreme Court cases
