= Kennon v Spry =

Decision of the High Court of Australia

Kenny v Spry
- Court: High Court of Australia
- Full case name: Kennon v Spry; Spry v Kennon
- Decided: 3 December 2008
- Citations: [2008] HCA 56, 238 CLR 366

Court membership
- Judges sitting: French CJ, Hayne J, Gummow J, Kiefel J, Heydon J

Case opinions
- appeal dismissed (French CJ, Hayne & Gummow JJ, Kiefel J) dissenting (Heydon J)

Kennon v Spry is a landmark decision of the High Court of Australia, important in the fields of family law and trust law.

The case concerned the distribution of assets held in a discretionary trust in the context of a family law dispute. The parties were in dispute as to whether assets contained within the discretionary trust should be taken into account in a property settlement order.

The decision clarified the way discretionary trusts are to be dealt with by courts in Australian family law proceedings, the nature of the equitable rights held by beneficiaries in trusts, and the interpretation of the term 'property' in the Family Law Act 1975 (Cth).

== Background ==
Dr. Ian Spry QC and his wife, Helen, were married in 1978. During their marriage, Spry established several discretionary trusts in which he, his wife, and his children were beneficiaries. In 1998, during marital difficulties, he made a variation to remove himself and his wife.

After their separation, Helen Spry filed an application in the Family Court seeking property settlement and maintenance. She sought orders under s106B of the Family Law Act 1975 (Cth) to set aside the 1998 variation, and asked for an order that her husband pay her 50% of the assets and resources held in their individual or joint names, in the Trust, and in their Children's Trusts.

One of the key issues in the matter was whether assets held within the family trust should be considered part of the marital property available for distribution between the parties. After a hearing at the Melbourne Family Court, Justice Strickland delivered judgement setting aside the 1998 instrument, and ordered that Spry pay his wife the sum of ~$2,200,000.

Spry appealed against the decision. The Full Court of the Family Court dismissed the appeal by majority. In 2008 special leave was granted at the High Court.

== Judgement ==
The High Court by majority ruled that the assets held within the family trust were available for distribution. Important to the court's reasoning was the interpretation of 'property' as defined in s4(1) of the Act, and the act's formulation of jurisdiction exercised by the Family Court.

While taking into account the Act's legislative context, Ms Spry's property rights were deemed by the court to include her equitable right to 'due administration of the Trust', accompanied by the fiduciary duty of the husband, as trustee, to consider in what way the power should be exercised.

Chief Justice French considered the position of Spry prior to a variation made in 1983, and found that prior to his removal, the trust assets would have been considered his property. It was persuasive to him that there existed a combination of the husband's discretionary power of distribution as trustee, with the wife's standing as an eligible beneficiary. This combination substantively resulted in a situation where at the husband's whim, all trust assets could be made assets of a party to the marriage. Therefore, his rights and powers as trustee were considered to be worth the value of the trust assets.

He stated:

‘Where property is held under such a trust by a party to a marriage and the property has been acquired by or through the efforts of that party or his or her spouse, whether before or during the marriage, it does not, in my opinion, necessarily lose its character as “property of the parties to the marriage” because the party has declared a trust, of which he or she is trustee and can, under the terms of that trust, give the property away to other family or extended family members at his or her discretion.

For so long as Spry retained the legal title to the Trust and her equitable right, it remained ... property of the parties to the marriage for the purposes of the power conferred on the Family Court by s 79. The assets would have been unarguably property of the marriage absent subjection to the Trust.’ _{- French CJ at para. (66)}

Hayne & Gummow JJ also agreed that the value of the discretionary trust should be included in the couple's asset pool of property under the act. There were three factors that led them to do so. (1) The wife retained an equitable right to 'due administration' of the trust, (2) The husband had a fiduciary duty toward her as trustee in considering exercise of his powers, and (3) the husband was legally able to transfer the entire of the trust fund to his wife, during the period in which they were married. They added that in the event that he had difficulties accessing the trust property to resolve his debt from the proceedings, that it would in future be open for him to apply at equity for orders altering the arrangements.

=== Dissent ===
Justice Heydon dissented, reasoning that the trust assets should not be considered property due to a lack of sufficient control over the assets by Spry.

== Significance ==
The majority decision holding that assets of a discretionary family trust could be counted as property was controversial to some legal commentators. Prior to Kennon v Spry, it was believed by some that the law enabled the family discretionary to act as an effective method of asset protection against estranged spouses.

In a speech elaborating upon the case, Justice Paul Brereton stated that in his view, Spry was in fact entirely consistent with prior case law; including the decisions of Ashton, and Davidson.

== See also ==
- Norbis v Norbis
- Gronow v Gronow
- Family law in Australia
