= Minister for Immigration and Multicultural Affairs v Yusuf =

Judgement of the High Court of Australia

- Court: High Court of Australia
- Full case name: Minister for Immigration and Multicultural Affairs v Yusuf
- Decided: 31 May 2001
- Citation: 206 CLR 323

Court membership
- Judges sitting: Gleeson CJ, Gaudron, McHugh, Gummow, Kirby, Hayne and Callinan JJ

Minister for Immigration and Multicultural Affairs v Yusuf, also known as 'Yusuf', is a decision of the High Court of Australia.

It is a notable case in Australian Administrative Law, particularly for its holdings regarding s430 of the Migration Act, and the meaning of jurisdictional error.

As of September 2020, 'Yusuf' is the 16th most cited case of the High Court.

== Background ==
The appeal concerned four appeal proceedings in which refugee visas had been denied by the Refugee Review Tribunal. Each appeal reached the High Court via the appeal process written in Part 8 of the Migration Act.

Each appeal argued that insufficient reasons had been provided by the decision makers who had denied the plaintiffs visas, under the act. Section 430 of the act mandated that decision makers provide reasons for their decision. All four appeal proceedings were successful before the Full Federal Court.

The Minister then obtained special leave at the High Court.

== Judgement ==
The High Court held that the reasons provided by the tribunal in each case was sufficient to satisfy s430.

Additional commentary was provided by the court as to the meaning of 'jurisdictional error'. Regarding Jurisdictional error, the court wrote:

It is necessary, however, to understand what is meant by "jurisdictional error" under the general law and the consequences that follow from a decision‑maker making such an error. As was said in Craig v South Australia, if an administrative tribunal (like the Tribunal)

"falls into an error of law which causes it to identify a wrong issue, to ask itself a wrong question, to ignore relevant material, to rely on irrelevant material or, at least in some circumstances, to make an erroneous finding or to reach a mistaken conclusion, and the tribunal's exercise or purported exercise of power is thereby affected, it exceeds its authority or powers. Such an error of law is jurisdictional error which will invalidate any order or decision of the tribunal which reflects it."

"Jurisdictional error" can thus be seen to embrace a number of different kinds of error, the list of which, in the passage cited from Craig, is not exhaustive. Those different kinds of error may well overlap. The circumstances of a particular case may permit more than one characterisation of the error identified, for example, as the decision‑maker both asking the wrong question and ignoring relevant material. What is important, however, is that identifying a wrong issue, asking a wrong question, ignoring relevant material or relying on irrelevant material in a way that affects the exercise of power is to make an error of law. Further, doing so results in the decision‑maker exceeding the authority or powers given by the relevant statute. In other words, if an error of those types is made, the decision‑maker did not have authority to make the decision that was made; he or she did not have jurisdiction to make it. Nothing in the Act suggests that the Tribunal is given authority to authoritatively determine questions of law or to make a decision otherwise than in accordance with the law

== See also ==
- List of High Court of Australia cases
- Australian Broadcasting Tribunal v Bond
