= Pearce v R =

- Court: High Court of Australia
- Full case name: Pearce v R
- Decided: 10 September 1998
- Citations: [1998] HCA 57, 194 CLR 610

Court membership
- Judges sitting: McHugh, Gummow, Kirby, Hayne and Callinan JJ

Case opinions
- appeal allowed (per McHugh, Hayne, Callinan JJ) partial concurrence (Gummow J) dissenting (Kirby J)

Pearce v R is an Australian legal case decided in the High Court.

In criminal law the case is an important authority, particularly for its statements of principle which apply to the laws of double jeopardy and sentencing in Australia.

The case involved two charges that had arisen from a single course of conduct of Pearce, in which he had broken into the victim's home and beaten them.

According to LawCite, it is the 26th most cited case of the High Court.

== Facts ==
The appellant, Pearce had been charged with multiple offences involving the same course of conduct. Pearce had broken and entered a house, and seriously assaulted the occupant inside.

After a guilty finding, he was sentenced concurrently for two offences, but cumulatively for another.

Pearce argued that the sentence should not have been imposed cumulatively; he argued that to do so for offences that arose on the same course of conduct, would be contrary to the double jeopardy rule.

== Judgement ==
The majority ruled that the lower court had erred by imposing a cumulative sentence. Instead, they said, the court should have worked out what the punishment should have been for each charge; and then imposed a sentence reflecting which sort of punishment ought be put in place overall.

== Significance ==
The case is particularly well known for an important statement about sentencing law by the majority, which has since been cited numerous times since. The passage reads:

'To an offender, the only relevant question may be "how long", and that may suggest that a sentencing judge or appellate court should have regard only to the total effective sentence that is to be or has been imposed on the offender. Such an approach is likely to mask error. A judge sentencing an offender for more than one offence must fix an appropriate sentence for each offence and then consider questions of cumulation or concurrence, as well, of course, as questions of totality'

It is also well known for a highly cited passage regarding the doctrine of double jeopardy, as it applies to sentencing:

To the extent to which two offences of which an offender stands convicted contain common elements, it would be wrong to punish that offender twice for the commission of the elements that are common. No doubt that general principle must yield to any contrary legislative intention, but the punishment to be exacted should reflect what an offender has done; it should not be affected by the way in which the boundaries of particular offences are drawn. Often those boundaries will be drawn in a way that means that offences overlap. To punish an offender twice if conduct falls in that area of overlap would be to punish offenders according to the accidents of legislative history, rather than according to their just deserts.

== See also ==
- M v R
- R v De Simoni
- Veen v R (No 2)
