= General Steel Industries Inc v Commissioner for Railways (NSW) =

Judgement of the High Court of Australia

- Court: High Court of Australia
- Full case name: GENERAL STEEL INDUSTRIES INC. v. COMMISSIONER FOR RAILWAYS (N.S.W.)
- Decided: 9 Nov 1964
- Citation: 112 CLR 125

Court membership
- Judge sitting: Barwick CJ

Case opinions
- Appeal dismissed with costs Barwick CJ

General Steel Industries v Commissioner for Railways is a decision of the High Court of Australia.

The case is notable in Australian jurisprudence for the principles that apply to summary terminations of proceedings.

According to LawCite, it is the 14th most cited decision of the High Court.

== Facts ==
General Steel Industries commenced an action against the Commissioner for Railways, seeking injunctions. It sought to restrain the infringement of a patent granted under the Patents Act.

The defendants requested that the court set aside the plaintiff's claim, on the grounds that the plaintiff did not have any cause of action. They sought an order under the High Court's inherent jurisdiction to prevent an abuse of process, as provided for in the High Court Rules.

== Judgement ==
Barwick CJ, writing the sole opinion; dismissed the plaintiff's action summarily, with costs.

In doing so, he described the principles that belie the jurisdiction of courts to terminate actions summarily. In a passage that has been subsequently cited more than 1000 times, he wrote:

The plaintiff rightly points out that the jurisdiction summarily to terminate an action is to be sparingly employed and is not to be used except in a clear case where the Court is satisfied that it has the requisite material and the necessary assistance from the parties to reach a definite and certain conclusion. I have examined the case law on the subject, to some of which I was referred in argument and to which I append a list of references. There is no need for me to discuss in any detail the various decisions, some of which were given in cases in which the inherent jurisdiction of a court was invoked and others in cases in which counterpart rules to Order 26, r. 18, were the suggested source of authority to deal summarily with the claim in question. It is sufficient for me to say that these cases uniformly adhere to the view that the plaintiff ought not to be denied access to the customary tribunal which deals with actions of the kind he brings, unless his lack of a cause of action - if that be the ground on which the court is invited, as in this case, to exercise its powers of summary dismissal - is clearly demonstrated. The test to be applied has been variously expressed; "so obviously untenable that it cannot possibly succeed"; "manifestly groundless"; "so manifestly faulty that it does not admit of argument"; "discloses a case which the Court is satisfied cannot succeed"; "under no possibility can there be a good cause of action"; "be manifest that to allow them" (the pleadings) "to stand would involve useless expense".

He discussed the balance that must be struck between a party being 'saved from the vexation of the continuance of useless and futile proceedings' on the one hand; and parties not being 'improperly deprived of (an) opportunity for the trial of (the) case'. In light of that balance, he said that;

'I do not think that the exercise of the jurisdiction should be reserved for those cases where argument is unnecessary to evoke the futility of the plaintiff's claim. Argument, perhaps even of an extensive kind, may be necessary to demonstrate that the case of the plaintiff is so clearly untenable that it cannot possibly succeed'

== Significance ==
The case is a landmark decision within Australia's civil procedure jurisprudence, and is often cited in cases where the threshold for summary termination is set by the Common Law. Due to the role it plays in that context, the case is one of Australia's most cited High Court cases.

== See also ==
- Australian patent law
- List of High Court of Australia cases
