= Postiglione v R =

Judgement of the High Court of Australia

- Court: High Court of Australia
- Full case name: Postiglione v R
- Decided: 24 July 1997
- Citations: [1997] HCA 26, 189 CLR 295

Court membership
- Judges sitting: Dawson, Gaudron, McHugh, Gummow and Kirby JJ

Case opinions
- appeal allowed Dawson, Gaudron JJ; Kirby J partial concurrence McHugh J Gummow J

Postiglione v R also known as 'Postiglione' is a decision of the High Court of Australia.

It is an important decision in Australian criminal law for its principles that apply to sentencing law.

The case involved an appeal against sentence by Postiglione, after a guilty plea to two charges of conspiring to import heroin and cocaine.

According to LawCite, Postiglione is the 44th most cited decision of the High Court.

== Background ==
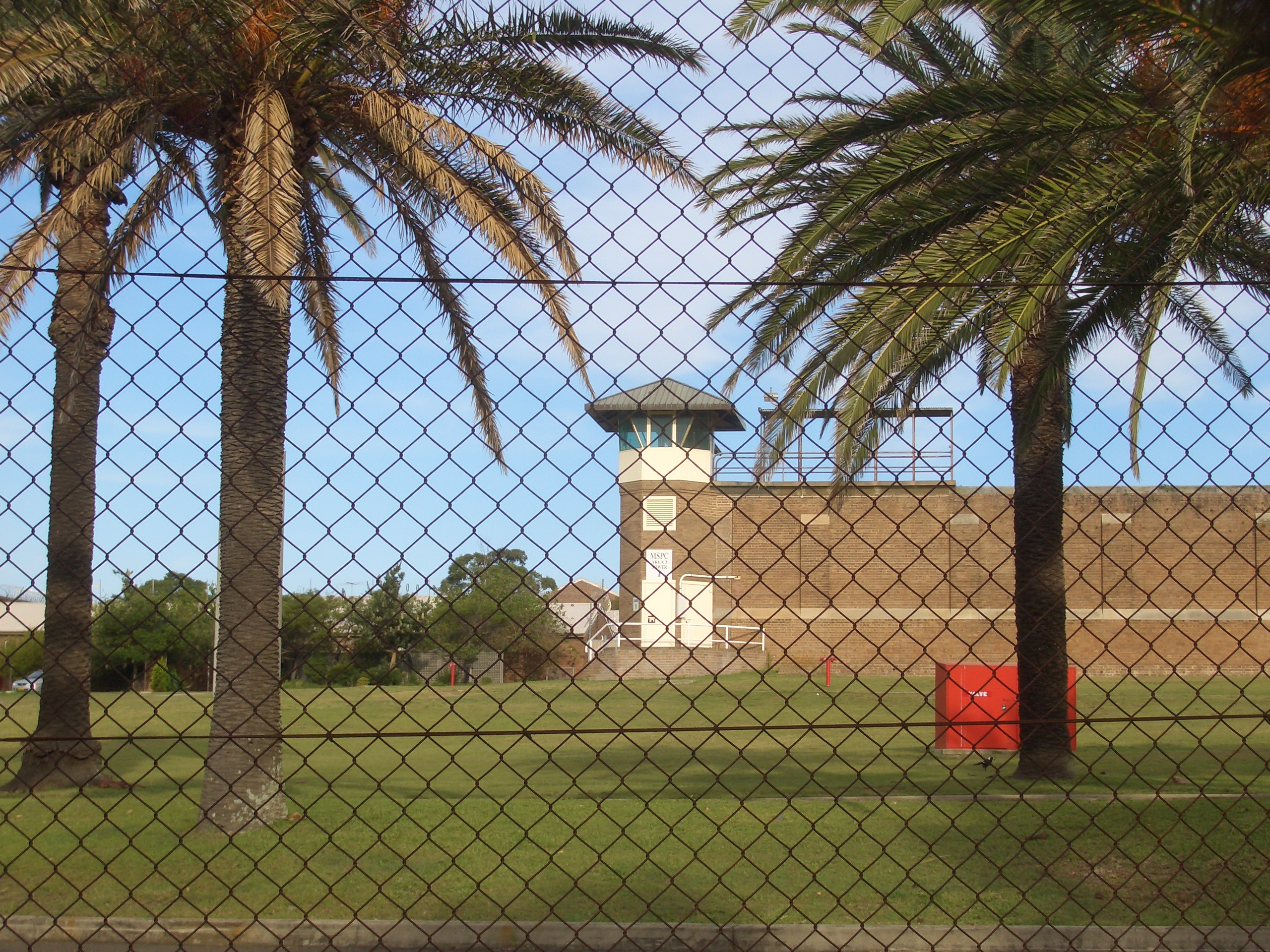
a photograph of Long Bay gaol, where Postiglione and Savvas were imprisoned at the time they conspired to import drugs

The appellant, Mario Postiglione, and a man named George Savvas were each serving sentences for various crimes at Long Bay gaol. Postiglione was serving a sentence of 12 years, while Savvas was serving a sentence of 25 years.

While in prison, the two prisoners were involved in a conspiracy to import drugs into Australia. In relation to this, Mario Postiglione pleaded guilty to two charges of conspiracy to import a prohibited substance. He was sentenced to 18 years imprisonment with a non-parole period of 13 years and 10 months. It was revealed at sentencing that he had co-operated with authorities and gave evidence against his co-conspirators. For that, he was given a three-year discount. (Note: Mathews J indicated that, but for that, she would have imposed a sentence of 21 years with a non-parole period of 16 years and 10 months) His co-conspirator, Savvas, was sentenced to 25 years with a non-parole period of 18 years. Savvas received a longer sentence because he was the leader of the conspiracy.

These sentences had very different effects on Postiglione and Savvas, due to the circumstances of their incarceration. Postiglione's time in prison was effectively to be extended by 12 years, whereas Savvas only had his time extended by 5 years.

Postiglione appealed his sentence, arguing that the sentencing judge had failed to properly apply the parity principle. His appeal was dismissed before the Court of Criminal Appeal

He then obtained special leave to appeal at the High Court.

== Judgement ==
Postiglione's arguments regarding sentencing were upheld by a majority of the High Court. Dawson & Gaudron summarized the core of his case as being;

'... the fact that the sentence imposed on Savvas has the effect of extending his period of imprisonment by 5 years and 10 months, whilst (Postiglione's) is extended by 12 years and 2 months, or 11 years if regard is had solely to the non-parole period. The Court of Criminal Appeal declined to take that difference into account, treating the "unusual outcome" as the result of "the [different] custodial situation of each prisoner at the time of sentence, and the need for a sentencing judge to have regard to the principle of totality to ensure that the ultimate sentence actually imposed was not excessive having regard to the total criminality involved in all of the criminal activities to which it attached.'

To this, Dawson & Gaudron said:

'The approach adopted by the Court of Criminal Appeal in this case treats or has the effect of treating the total period to be served in custody and, more particularly, the actual period to be served in consequence of the offences committed as irrelevant to the proportion which the sentences imposed on Postiglione and Savvas should bear to each other. In the circumstances of this case, the real punishment for both Savvas and Postiglione is the extra period which they must spend in prison. Due proportion cannot be determined without taking it into account. However, that is not to say that it is the only matter to be taken into account.'

They then concluded that, Postiglione should have been sentenced so the actual extra time to be spent in prison would be two thirds of that imposed on Savvas.

After upholding the appeal, the High Court remitted the matter to lower courts to resolve attendant issues to the case; including various procedural issues that had arisen below.

== Significance ==
Whilst citing Postiglione, the Australian Law Reform Commission has summarised the parity principle as follows;

'The principle of parity between co-offenders is essentially a subset of the principle of consistency, although it is often referred to as a sentencing principle in its own right. Parity stipulates that offenders who have jointly engaged in the same type of criminal conduct should ordinarily receive similar sentences. However, courts are able to have regard to any relevant differences in the level of culpability of each offender, and to take into account differences in the subjective circumstances of the offenders. Differences in sentences imposed on co-offenders should not be so marked as to give rise to a justifiable sense of grievance on the part of the offender with the heavier sentence.'

== See also ==
- List of High Court of Australia cases
- Lowe v R
- Veen v R (No 2)
