= SZBEL v Minister for Immigration and Multicultural and Indigenous Affairs =

SZBEL v MIMA
- Court: High Court of Australia
- Full case name: SZBEL v Minister for Immigration & Multicultural & Indigenous Affairs
- Decided: 2006
- Citation: [2006] HCA 63

Court membership
- Judges sitting: Gleeson CJ, Kirby, Hayne, Callinan and Heydon JJ

Case opinions
- appeal allowed The tribunal failed to give SZBEL natural justice Gleeson CJ, Kirby, Hayne, Callinan and Heydon JJ

SZBEL v MIMA is a 2006 decision of the High Court of Australia.

The case is important to Administrative Law in Australia, especially for its elaboration upon the principle of natural justice (a principle which is now referred to in Australia as 'procedural fairness').

SZBEL is the 24th most cited High Court case according to LawCite.

== Facts ==
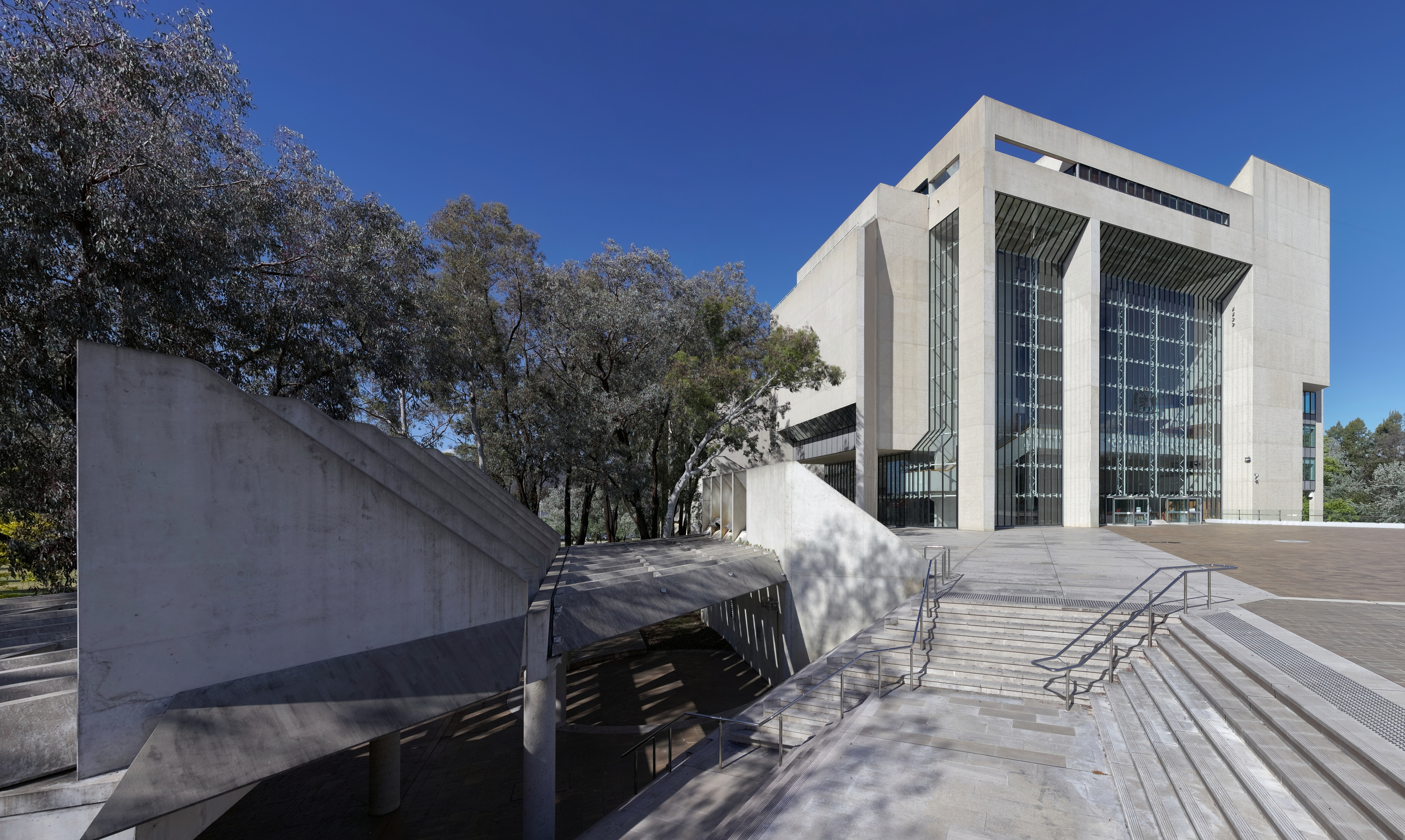
The High Court

The applicant applied for a protection visa with the Department of Immigration and was denied. He then applied for review at the Refugee Review Tribunal and was invited to elaborate upon his claims.

He was again denied; with the Tribunal member later finding that his evidence had been implausible. However, the Tribunal member did not inform the applicant of its reasoning before making its finding. The Tribunal's reasons were different to those of the Department.

The applicant then sought judicial review.

== Judgement ==
The High Court unanimously found that the appellant had been denied procedural fairness, because he had not been given an opportunity to rebut adverse conclusions that had been made against him by the Tribunal.

The applicant had incorrectly assumed that the reasons given by the original decision-maker were the relevant 'issues arising' at his review. The tribunal was obligated, and had failed, to put the applicant on notice of issues arising that would be determinative of the review. The Tribunal had failed to give the appellant opportunity to give evidence on two of the three relevant issues.

The court wrote that;

'The issues that arise in relation to the decision are to be identified by the Tribunal. But if the Tribunal takes no steps to identify some issue other than those that the delegate considered dispositive, and does not tell the applicant what that other issue is, the applicant is entitled to assume that the issues the delegate considered dispositive are “the issues arising in relation to the decision under review ... unless some other additional issues are identified by the Tribunal (as they may be), it would ordinarily follow that, on review by the Tribunal, the issues arising in relation to the decision under review would be those which the original decision-maker identified as determinative against the applicant'

It then remitted the decision for reconsideration.

== See also ==
- Kioa v West
- List of High Court of Australia cases
