= Ebner v Official Trustee in Bankruptcy =

Judgement of the High Court of Australia

- Court: High Court of Australia
- Full case name: Maxwell William Ebner v The Official Trustee in Bankruptcy
- Decided: 7 December 2000
- Citation: 205 CLR 337; 2000 HCA 63

Court membership
- Judges sitting: Gleeson C.J., Gaudron, McHugh, Gummow, Kirby, Hayne, and Callinan JJ

Case opinions
- Appeal dismissed Gleeson CJ, McHugh, Gummow, Hayne JJ; Gaudron J Kirby J Callinan J

Ebner v Official Trustee in Bankruptcy is a decision of the High Court of Australia.

The case is an important decision in Administrative Law, for its holdings about the legal test for actual and apprehended bias in a decision maker.

According to LawCite, the case has been cited the 28th most times of any High Court decision.

== Facts ==
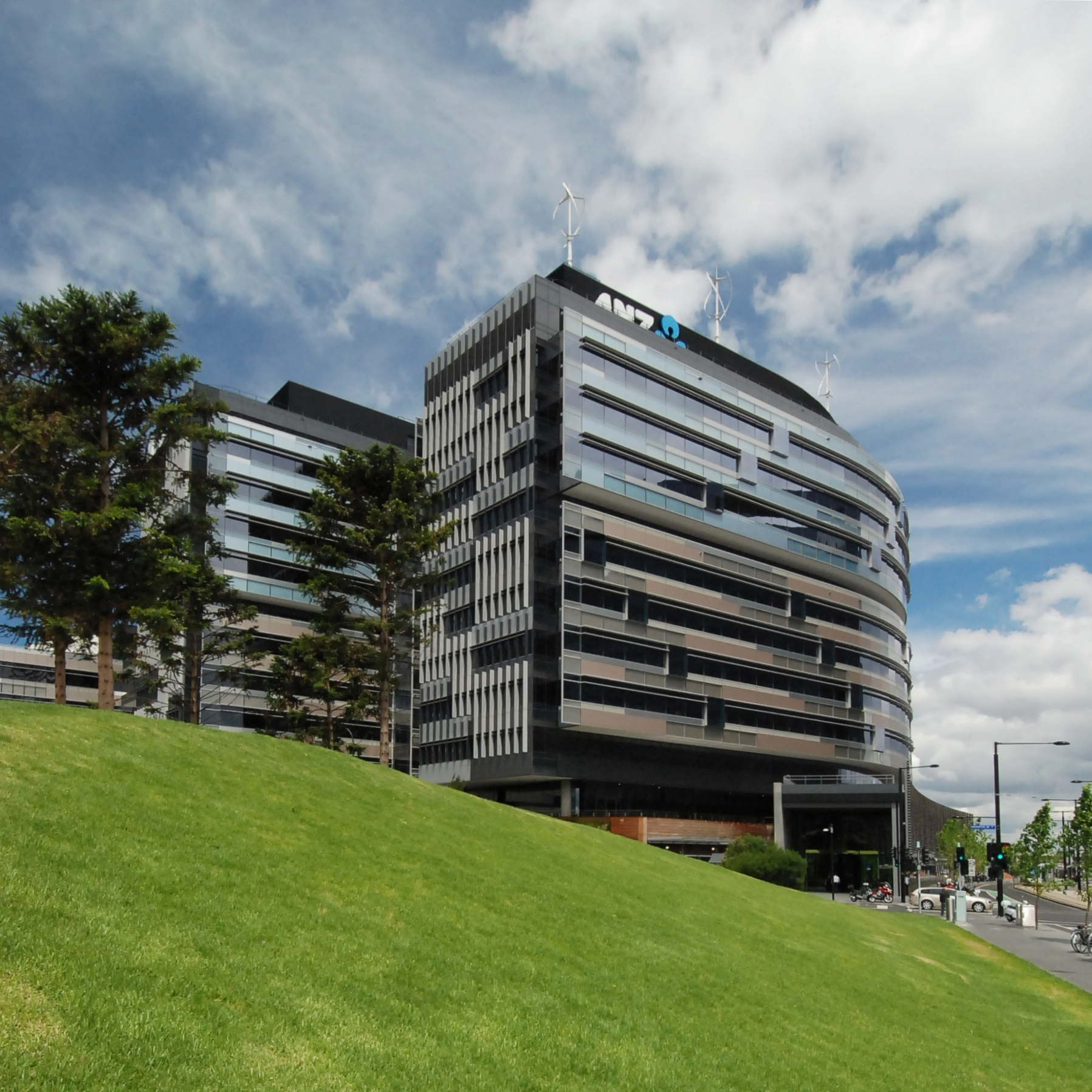
The ANZ Bank headquarters in Docklands, Melbourne

The facts of Ebner involved two appeals. In each proceeding it was contended that the presiding judge ought to be disqualified for reason of holding shares in the bank ANZ. The bank had an interest in the outcome of the proceedings.

In each matter it couldn't be suggested that the value of the shares would be affected by the case's decision. However, the parties requested that the High Court reaffirm a common law rule that "any direct pecuniary interest, however small, in the subject of inquiry ... disqualifies a person from acting as a judge in the matter". (Note: That test comes from R v Rand (1866) LR 1 QB 230 at 232, as applied in R v Gough [1993] AC 646 at 661 per Lord Goff of Chieveley.)

== Judgement ==
The High Court unanimously dismissed the appeal. Whilst doing so, it restated the common law rules of actual bias and apprehended bias.

The majority stated the applicable test for apprehended bias as being:

'whether a fair-minded lay observer might reasonably apprehend that the judge might not bring an impartial mind to the resolution of the question the judge is required to decide.'

The majority then stated that the apprehension of bias principle requires two steps for its application:

'First, it requires the identification of what it is said might lead a judge (or juror) to decide a case other than on its legal and factual merits.

(Second) there must be an articulation of the logical connection between the matter and the feared deviation from the course of deciding the case on its merits.

The bare assertion that a judge (or juror) has an "interest" in litigation, or an interest in a party to it, will be of no assistance until the nature of the interest, and the asserted connection with the possibility of departure from impartial decision making, is articulated. Only then can the reasonableness of the asserted apprehension of bias be assessed.'

In each of the appeals concerned within Ebner, the judges were found to have only relatively small holdings of shares, and the decisions were expected to have a negligible impact on ANZ's share price. This led the court to find the tests for apprehended bias had not been met.

== See also ==
- List of High Court of Australia cases
