= Oshlack v Richmond River Council =

Decision of the High Court of Australia

- Court: High Court of Australia
- Full case name: Oshlack v Richmond River Council
- Decided: 1998
- Citation: 193 CLR 72

Court membership
- Judges sitting: Brennan CJ, Gaudron, McHugh, Gummow, and Kirby JJ

Case opinions
- The trial judge's discretion not to award costs against the public interest litigant ought be upheld Gaudron & Gummow JJ; Kirby J dissenting Brennan CJ; McHugh J

Oshlack v Richmond River Council is a decision of the High Court of Australia.

The case is notable for its statements regarding costs orders in the context of public interest litigation. Its facts concerned an application for costs against an unsuccessful litigant in a case relevant to the public interest. The High Court decided by majority that the trial judge's discretion not to impose a costs order against Oshlack should be upheld.

Oshlack is an important case in Australian civil procedure. As of April 2023 it was the 24th most cited High Court case, according to LawCite as of September 2020. (Note: LawCite citation statistics track the written judgements of courts, journal articles, and tribunals (both in Australia and overseas).)

== Facts ==
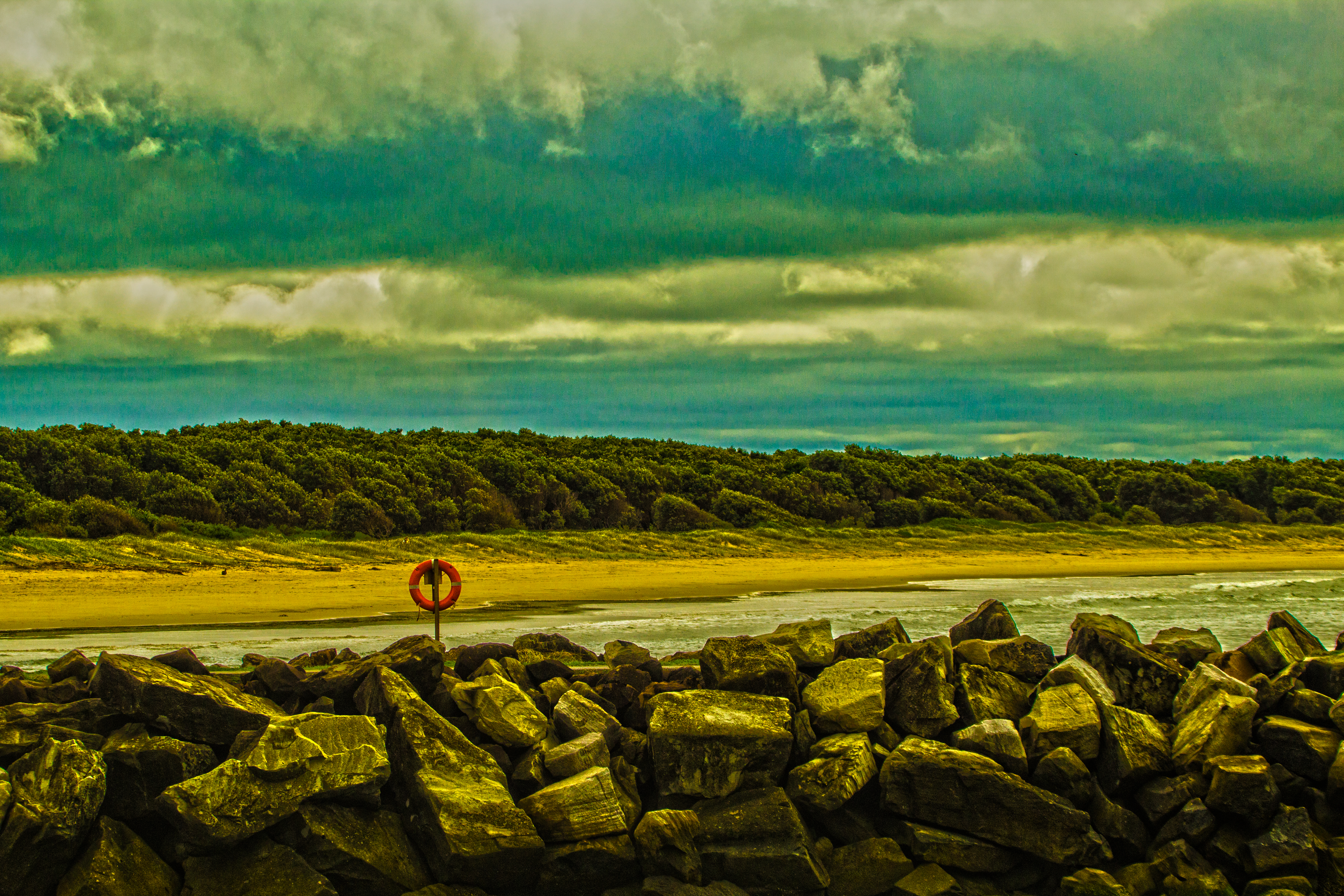
Evans Head in 2017

The case facts concerned costs orders following an unsuccessful lawsuit by a Mr Oshlack against Richmond River Council. Oshlack contended that consent given by the council for a subdivision at Evans Head was void, due to breaching the Environmental Planning and Assessment Act 1979 (NSW). He lost that lawsuit.

Subsequently, the council sought to recover legal costs from him. The trial judge, Justice Stein, determined that it was appropriate to make no order as to costs.

The Court of Appeal held that his decision had miscarried, for taking into account that the proceedings had been brought in the public interest; which was held by the court to be an irrelevant consideration when making costs orders.

Oshlack subsequently obtained special leave to appeal at the High Court.

== Judgment ==
By majority the High Court upheld the trial judge's discretion not to award costs. The fact that the case had been brought in the public interest was held not to be an irrelevant consideration.

The court additionally emphasised the discretion available to trial judges, expressing that there was "no absolute rule ... (that) a successful party is to be compensated by the unsuccessful party" following litigation.

== See also ==
- Land and Environment Court of New South Wales
- List of High Court of Australia cases
