= Minister for Aboriginal Affairs v Peko-Wallsend Ltd =

- Court: High Court of Australia
- Full case name: Minister For Aboriginal Affairs and another v Peko-Wallsend Ltd and others
- Decided: 31 July 1986
- Citations: [1986] HCA 40 (1986) 162 CLR 24

Court membership
- Judges sitting: Gibbs CJ, Mason, Brennan, Deane and Dawson JJ

Case opinions
- appeal dismissed The Minister failed to take into account Peko's later representations, which were a relevant consideration Gibbs CJ, Mason J, Brennan J, Deane J, Dawson J

Minister for Aboriginal Affairs v Peko-Wallsend Ltd also known as 'Peko', is a decision of the High Court of Australia.

The case is notable for its holdings relating to Australian Administrative Law; primarily in regards to relevant and irrelevant considerations, and constructive knowledge.

As of September 2020, 'Peko' is the 11th most cited case of the High Court.

== Facts ==
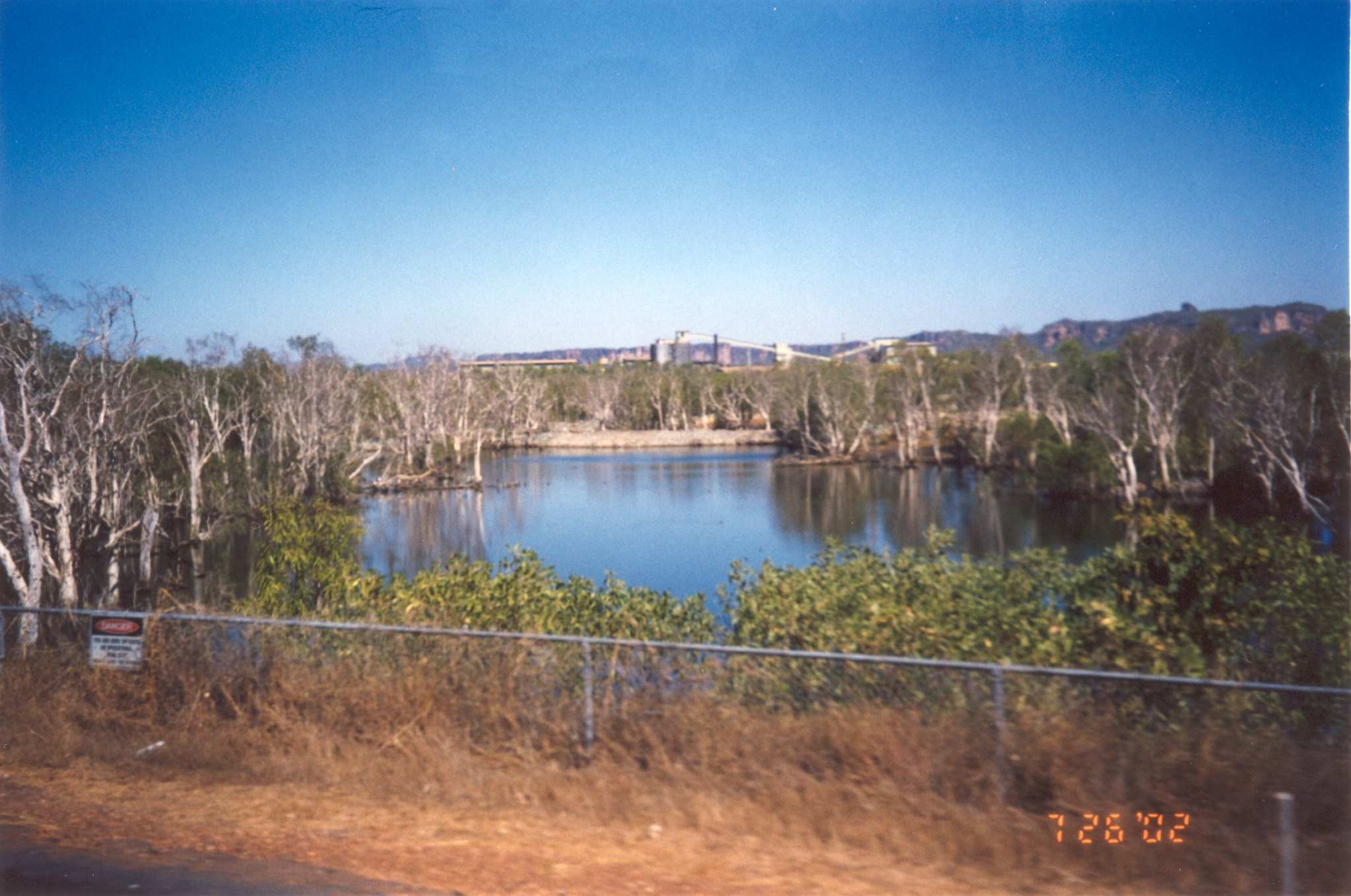
Pictured: a photograph of Kakadu's Ranger Uranium Mine as viewed from the road

The Alligator Rivers region in the Northern Territory was the subject of Aboriginal land claims and was also being investigated for uranium deposits by Peko-Wallsend.

The Aboriginal land claim was investigated by the Aboriginal Land Commissioner, Toohey J. During his investigation, Peko-Wallsend did not tell the Commissioner the exact location of a rich uranium deposit that had been found, named 'Ranger 68'. This resulted in the Commissioner inferring that the deposit was located outside of the claimed land area; when in fact it was located within that area. The Commissioner recommended that the Aboriginal land claim be granted.

Peko-Wallsend then made urgent communications to the Minister, explaining that 'Ranger 68' was in fact within the claimed area. Peko-Wallsend requested that the minister reconsider the Commissioner's comments and decision in light of this new information and requested that he remove the portion of land containing Ranger 68 from the land grant area.

Peko-Wallsend's representations were ignored, and the minister went ahead with the land grant. Peko-Wallsend was then successful in overturning the minister's decision at the Full Federal Court on Administrative law grounds.

The Minister then appealed to the High Court.

== Judgment ==
The court found that the minister should have taken into account Peko-Wallsend's representations when making his decision. By failing to do so, the minister failed to take into account a relevant consideration. The decision therefore erred at law.

Mason J, in his judgment, discussed various propositions relating to administrative law doctrines in light of previous case law. Issues elaborated upon included the use of statutory interpretation to infer what is needed by a decision maker under administrative law, constructive knowledge, relevant and irrelevant considerations in decision making, and the appropriate role of courts in reviewing the exercise of an administrative discretion.

== See also ==
- List of High Court of Australia cases
- House v The King
