= Pacific Film Laboratories v Commissioner of Tax =

Judgement of the High Court of Australia

- Court: High Court of Australia
- Full case name: Pacific Film Laboratories Pty Ltd v Federal Commissioner of Taxation
- Decided: 9 October 1970
- Citations: [1970] HCA 36, (1970) 121 CLR 154

Court membership
- Judge sitting: [Barwick CJ, McTiernan, Windeyer, Owen and Walsh JJ]

In Pacific Film Laboratories v Commissioner of Tax, (Australia) Windeyer J defined copyright: "It is not a right in an existing thing. It is a negative right, as it has been called, a power to prevent the making of a physical thing by copying."

== Case Details ==
The Pacific Film Laboratories v. Commissioner of Tax was regarding whether the reproduction of prints owned by a third party, for that third party was an act of sale which could incur sales tax. Pacific Film argued that as it had no property right in the prints, it was not selling anything to the customer which might be taxed. The High Court rejected this argument saying that when Pacific Film reproduced the customer's negatives, under authorisation from the customer, the copyright was owned by the customer but the chattel produced in the process of reproduction was owned by Pacific Film. The sale of this chattel to the customer incurred the sales tax.
