= MIMA v Respondents S152/2003 =

Judgement of the High Court of Australia

- Court: High Court of Australia
- Full case name: Minister for Immigration and Multicultural Affairs v Respondents S152/2003
- Decided: 2004
- Citation: 222 CLR 1

Court membership
- Judges sitting: Gleeson CJ, McHugh, Kirby, Hayne and Heydon JJ

Case opinions
- appeal allowed
- Concurrence: Glesson CJ, Hayne, Heydon JJ; McHugh J Kirby J

MIMA v Respondents S152/2003 is a decision of the High Court of Australia.

The case is important to refugee law in Australia, primarily for its holdings regarding refugee claims where an applicant fears harm from a non-state actor.

S152 is the 27th most cited High Court case according to LawCite.

== Facts ==
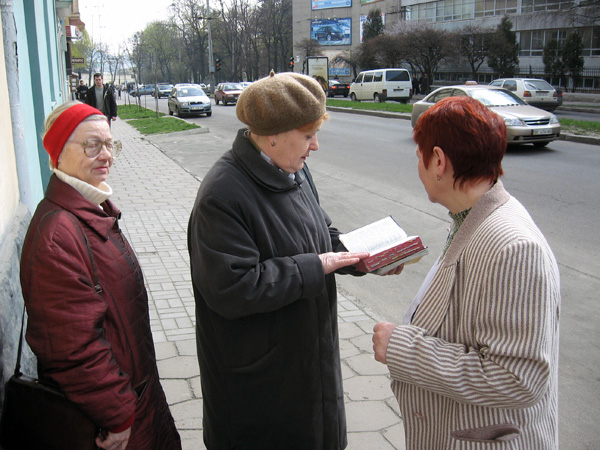
Pictured: Jehova witnesses in Lviv, the largest city in western Ukraine

A heterosexual couple from Ukraine applied for refugee visas in Australia. The male partner had suffered physical harm in his home country because of his involvement with the Jehovah's Witnesses.

To be eligible for the refugee visa, the applicant needed to satisfy criteria under Art 1A(2) of the Refugees Convention as amended by the Refugees Protocol, incorporated into Australian law by the Migration Act 1958 (Cth). (Note: Under that act, a refugee is regarded 'as a person who has a well-founded fear of persecution for reasons of race, religion, nationality, membership of a particular social group or political opinion')

It was accepted that he possessed a fear. However the tribunal rejected that the fear was 'well founded', due to evidence led at the tribunal about the contemporary status of Jehovah's Witnesses in Ukraine.

The couple then appealed at the Federal Court. The primary judge rejected their argument that the Ukraine government had condoned their mistreatment; writing:

'[I]t seems a large jump to infer, from the reaction of one officer in one police station [about which the male applicant complained], that the government of the Ukraine, considering that entity as a whole, was unable or unwilling to protect Ukrainian citizens against assault arising out of their religious beliefs ... I can understand the Tribunal's unwillingness to make a finding that the Ukrainian government was unwilling or unable to protect its citizens in the absence of evidence of ... other options having been tried [by the male applicant] and proved unsuccessful.'

On subsequent appeal the Full Court concluded that the Tribunal had erred. The Full Court held that the right question was 'whether, in a practical sense, the State was able to provide protection particularly in light of the pervasive pattern of harm'. It overturned the Tribunal's decision.

The Minister then appealed to the High Court.

== Judgement ==
The High Court unanimously upheld the Tribunal's original decision to refuse a refugee visa.

The majority reasoned that the Tribunal had made findings that the Ukrainian authorities were not responsible for the harm suffered, and that the government was willing and able to protect the applicant. Those findings made it reasonable to conclude that Ukraine would provide citizens in the applicant's position with a level of protection consistent with international standards.

Because of that, the majority concluded he was not a victim of persecution in the relevant convention sense; and the couldn't justify his unwillingness to seek the protection of his country of nationality.

== Significance ==
S152 is referred to extensively within the Administrative Appeal Tribunal's own handbook on Refugee Law in Australia, particularly for its precedential value in cases where an applicant faces a real fear of harm from a non-state actor.

== See also ==
- MIMA v Khawar
