= Neat Domestic Training Pty Ltd v AWB Ltd =

Judgement of the High Court of Australia

NEAT Domestic Trading Pty Ltd v AWB Ltd
- Court: High Court of Australia
- Full case name: NEAT Domestic Trading Pty Ltd v AWB Ltd and Anor Respondents
- Decided: 19 June 2003
- Citation: (2003) 216 CLR 277

Case history
- Prior action: none
- Subsequent action: none

Court membership
- Judges sitting: Gleeson CJ, McHugh, Kirby, Hayne and Callinan JJ

Case opinions
- (4:1) Appeal dismissed. Remedy available, ground of review not made out (per Gleeson CJ). No public law remedy available(per McHugh, Hayne and Callinan JJ)

NEAT Domestic Trading Pty Ltd v AWB Ltd was a case before the High Court of Australia which was decided in 2003.

== Background ==
AWB (a private corporation owned by wheat growers) had been granted a monopoly over the export of wheat in Australia. No other company could export wheat in bulk without the AWB's consent. NEAT Domestic Trading was a grain trader. It requested consent to export wheat and was refused. NEAT then appealed this decision, ultimately to the High Court.

NEAT claimed that AWB was acting in accordance with a rule or policy without regard to the merits of the case, thereby invoking s5(2)(f) and s6(2)(f) of the Judicial Review Act 1977(Cth). The policy in question was that AWB would refuse export permits to other bodies.

== Decision ==
Gleeson CJ found against NEAT on the grounds that the policy in question was legal, and that no material had been put to AWB that could persuade it to deviate from its policy. He concluded, although it was unnecessary to decide, that the decision was of an administrative character made under an enactment and therefore reviewable.

McHugh, Hayne and Callinan JJ held that public law remedies (such as review under the JR Act) were not available against AWB because of the role granted to it under the Act, the private character of AWB, being a company incorporated under corporations legislation and the fact that it was impossible to impose public law obligations on AWB and allow it to pursue its private interests.

Kirby J dissented, holding that the decision was one of an administrative character in the form outlined, and that the decisions at issue were each invalid and void.

== See also ==
- Administrative law
