= Deputy Federal Commissioner of Taxation (NSW) v W R Moran Pty Ltd =

Judgement of the High Court of Australia

- Court: High Court of Australia
- Full case name: The Deputy Federal Commissioner of Taxation (New South Wales) v W R Moran Proprietary Limited
- Decided: 25 July 1939
- Citation: (1939) 61 CLR 735

Case history
- Subsequent actions: W R Moran Pty Ltd v Deputy Federal Commissioner of Taxation (NSW) [1940] UKPCHCA 3; 63 CLR 338; [1940] AC 838

Court membership
- Judges sitting: Latham CJ, Rich, Starke, Evatt, and McTiernan JJ

Case opinions
- (4:1) There is no constitutional limit to granting money in a discriminatory manner (per Latham CJ, Rich, Starke & McTiernan JJ; Evatt J dissenting)

Deputy Federal Commissioner of Taxation (NSW) v W R Moran Pty Ltd (1939) 61 CLR 735 is a High Court of Australia case that deals with whether section 96 is limited by section 99, which prevents Commonwealth laws discriminating between States.

In this case, the Commonwealth imposed a tax on flour millers, but reimbursed the States based on their production of wheat in order to reimburse the flour millers by 90% of their taxes. The problem is that Tasmania, while milling flour, does not produce wheat. The majority held that the taxation was valid since the tax applied equally to all States, and there was no constitutional impediment to granting money discriminately. Per Latham CJ, section 96 is a means by which the Commonwealth, "when it thinks proper", can adjust inequalities between States. Thus, because there was no discrimination in taxation, yet grants are not subject to prohibitions based on discrimination, the majority held the laws to be valid.

Evatt J, conversely, examined the scheme as a whole, and ruled it invalid.

== See also ==
- Australian constitutional law
