= Bond v Commonwealth =

Judgement of the High Court of Australia

- Court: High Court of Australia
- Full case name: Bond v The Commonwealth of Australia
- Argued: 18 November 1903
- Decided: 19 November 1903
- Citations: [1903] HCA 2, (1903) 1 CLR 13

Court membership
- Judge sitting: Griffith CJ

Bond v Commonwealth was an early decision of the High Court of Australia that established that rights under the Constitution could not be taken away by Commonwealth legislation. The case was the second case heard by the High Court.

== Background ==
Mr. Bond had been an employee of the Post and Telegraph Department of the State of Victoria, before it was transferred to the Commonwealth postal service on 1 March 1901, soon after federation, in accordance with Section 69 of the Constitution. Following the transfer, the Commonwealth paid Bond wages at the rate of £132 per annum instead of his previous wage of £150, and Bond sued for the balance, under section 84 of the Constitution, which guaranteed commensurate wages for employees transferred to Commonwealth jurisdiction. Mr Bond was represented by Isaacs KC.

Mitchell argued for the Commonwealth that the claim was not enforceable in a Court of law by virtue of sec. 78(1) of the Public Service Act 1902, which came into effect on 1 January 1903, and provided:

"Nothing in this Act shall authorize the expenditure of any greater sum out of the Consolidated Revenue Fund by way of payment of any salary than is from time to time appropriated by the Parliament for that purpose"…

== Decision ==
Chief Justice Griffith, held that the Constitution did grant rights, which in Bond's case was a right to continued employment and receive equivalent wages. Regarding the Commonwealth's case – the Court held that in the face of Bond's constitutional right, whether sec. 78(1) of the Public Service Act, was or was not defensible in a court became irrelevant and the judgment ruled it unnecessary to consider the question altogether.

== Consequences ==
The intention apparent in the Constitution, was that public servants who transferred to the Commonwealth would continue to receive the same benefits they received from the States. The High Court's decision in Deakin v Webb, finding that Commonwealth officials and public servants were not liable to pay State income tax, increased their effective salary. Higgins KC who appeared in the High Court on behalf of Alfred Deakin wrote in 1905 that "The man in the street is startled and puzzled. He sees a public official, enjoying a regular salary in the postal department, paying the Victorian income-tax until federation, and then suddenly exempted from the tax because the post-office has passed over to federal control." The situation was resolved in 1907 by the Commonwealth Parliament enacting legislation that permitted the States to tax the income of a Commonwealth officer.
