= Abebe v Commonwealth =

Judgement of the High Court of Australia

- Court: High Court of Australia
- Full case name: Abebe v The Commonwealth of Australia
- Decided: 14 April 1999
- Citation: HCA 14; 197 CLR 510; 162 ALR 1; 73 ALJR 584

Court membership
- Judges sitting: Gleeson CJ, Gaudron, McHugh, Gummow, Kirby, Hayne and Callinan JJ

Case opinions
- Appeal dismissed Gleeson CJ, McHugh JJ; Gaudron J Gummow, Hayne JJ; Kirby J Callinan J

Abebe v Commonwealth, (Abebe) is a decision of the High Court of Australia and important in Australian Administrative Law. The decision ranks as the seventeenth most cited decision of the High Court.

== Facts ==
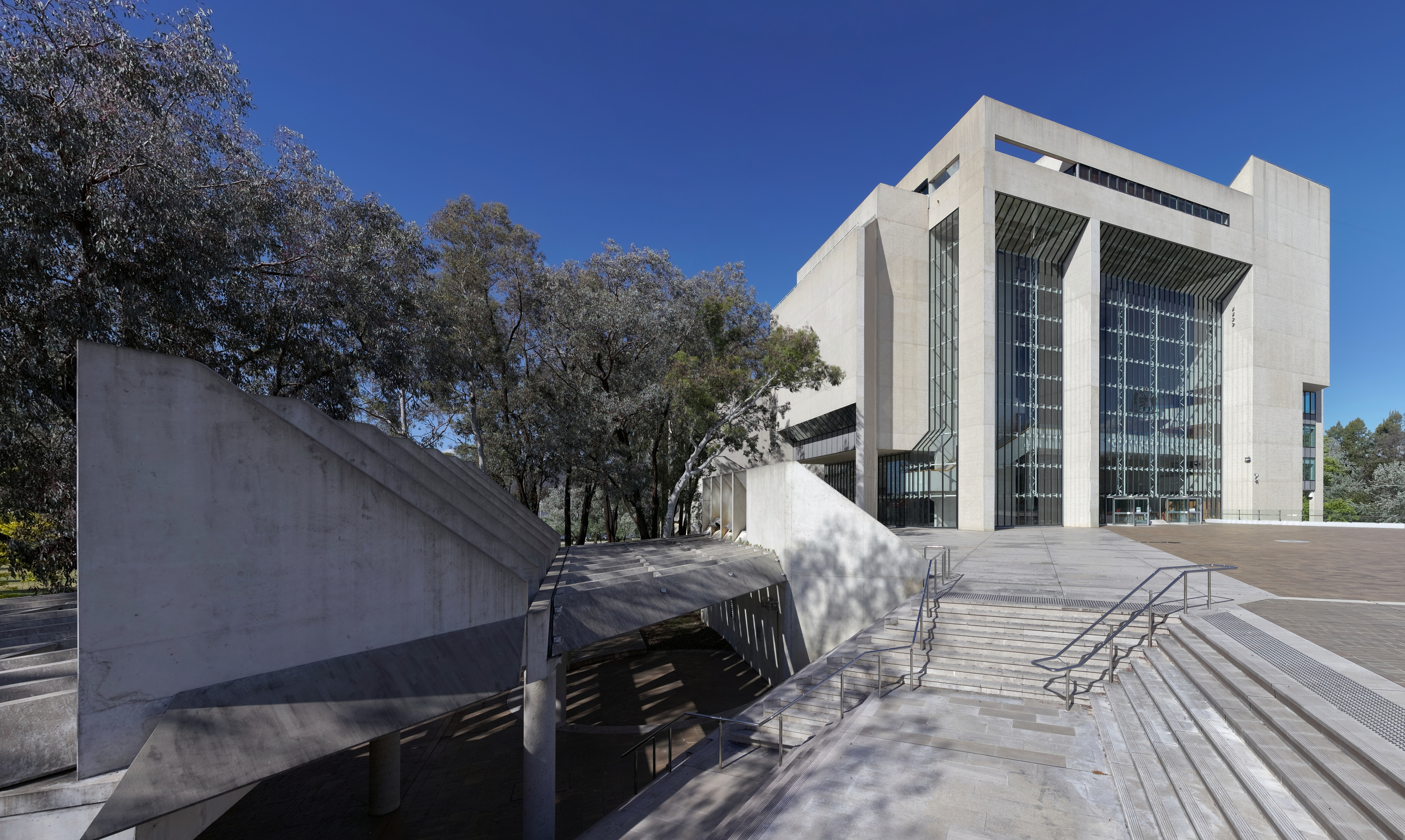
High Court of Australia

Abebe arose from the Refugee Review Tribunal (the Tribunal) refusing to grant refugee status to the applicant on the grounds she had lied during the interview process, undermining her credibility. The applicant sought judicial review of the decision on the grounds of being denied natural justice and that no reasonable authority could have made such a decision.

The Federal Court held that her review grounds were unavailable due to amendments made to the Migration Act removing various grounds of review for cases heard before Federal Courts.

Abebe then applied to the High Court in its original jurisdiction for review of the RRT's decision. Additionally, her application asked the court to rule that the aforementioned amendments to the act were unconstitutional.

== Judgement ==
A majority of the court held that the Parliament's amendments were constitutionally valid. It commented within the judgement that restricting federal courts in this way would inevitably cause problems for the High Court in managing workload and procedure.

In effect, appeals based on the grounds excluded by amendments to the Migration Act; would be able to be taken up directly by the High Court, so long as they fell within one of the section 75 constitutional writs.

In addition, the court ruled unanimously that Abebe's unreliability at interview entitled the RRT to dismiss her refugee claim.
