= Unions NSW & Ors v. State of New South Wales =

Decision of the High Court of Australia

Unions NSW & Ors v. State of New South Wales is a decision of the High Court of Australia.

The decision is significant as an application of Australia's the 'freedom of political communication' doctrine under the Australian Constitution.

The court applied the doctrine to decide that provisions in NSW's Electoral Funding Act. The provision as worded capped election-related political spending by political actors who aren't directly participating in the election ('third-party campaigners'). One of the resultant effects of the act was that trade unions were legally constrained in their ability to participate financially during an election.

Unions NSW challenged the act as unconstitutional. During the proceeding, a legislative committee of the NSW Parliament delivered a report recommending that the existing expenditure cap within the act of $20,000 be raised to $198,750. The NSW Government then conceded and submitted to the court that the act should be held invalid in its prior form. The High Court then agreed that it was invalid because in that form; it had not justified the burden the section imposed on political communication.

An additional provision of the act made it an offence for third-party campaigners to act in concert with other people to incur electoral expenditure exceeding the applicable cap. Two weeks before the hearing, the NSW Parliament repealed that section. Unions NSW sought a declaration that the section as it stood prior to repeal was invalid. The High Court unanimously held that it was unable to provide relief as the act's repeal meant there was no 'matter' for it to engage with. (Note: The High Court has interpreted Section 75 of the Australian Constitution as requiring that all cases before it are a 'matter')
