= Re Davis =

1947 High Court of Australia case

In Re Davis
- Court: High Court of Australia
- Full case name: In Re Davis
- Decided: 15 December 1947
- Citation: [1947] HCA 53

Case history
- Prior action: In Re Davis (1947) 48 SR (NSW) 33
- Subsequent action: none

Court membership
- Judges sitting: Latham CJ, Starke, Dixon, McTiernan and Williams JJ

Case opinions
- (4:1) The Supreme Court of New South Wales is not bound by section 10 of the Legal Practitioners Act 1898-1936 (NSW) to admit to the bar a candidate who is approved by the Board. (per Starke, Dixon, McTiernan and Williams JJ; Latham CJ dissenting) (5:0) The power of the Supreme Court of New South Wales to disbar may be exercised upon a ground that is antecedent to the admission of a barrister or the determination of the Board to approve him as a fit and proper person. The Supreme Court rightly held that the appellant was not a fit and proper person to be a barrister. (per Latham CJ, Starke, Dixon, McTiernan and Williams JJ)

In Re Davis (1947) 75 CLR 409; [1947] HCA 53 is a High Court of Australia case regarding the admission of legal practitioners and the jurisdiction of courts over barristers.

== Facts ==
Samuel Wilton Davis was admitted to the New South Wales Bar in 1946 following completion of all the necessary requirements under section 10 of the Legal Practitioners Act 1898-1936 (NSW).

He was disbarred by the Supreme Court of New South Wales in 1947 for failure to disclose that in 1935 he had pleaded guilty to a charge of breaking, entering and stealing.

== Decision ==
The High Court upheld the decision of the Supreme Court to disbar Davis.

Latham C.J. held that:

"I am of opinion, for the reasons stated, that the Court was entitled, in exercising its jurisdiction with respect to removal, to consider the whole conduct and character of the appellant for the purpose of answering the question whether he was a fit and proper person to continue to be a barrister, and that the Court rightly held that he was not a fit and proper person to continue to be a barrister."

Starke J. said that:

"if the facts of the appellant's conviction had not been suppressed, have rejected his application for admission. Both the Board and the Court were misled and this in itself is a sufficient ground for disbarring the appellant and removing his name from the roll of barristers."

Owen J made the following comments:

"As to the facts, I hope that I have stated them in a way which brings out many considerations undeniably favourable to the appellant. He has shown industry, perseverance and courage amidst the most adverse circumstances, and has overcome many disadvantages and obstacles encountered particularly in his early years. His mental breakdown and even his descent into criminality will evoke much human sympathy. It is always so upon moral questions, particularly when a man, whose conduct or actions have been in many respects praiseworthy, mars his life by a crime.

"But, though concern for an individual who is overtaken by the consequences of past wrongdoing is a very proper human feeling, it is no reason whatever for impairing in his interests the standards of a profession which plays so indispensable a part in the administration of justice.

"Housebreaking for the purpose of theft is not a crime the effect of which as a disclosure of character can be considered equivocal. It is not so easy to imagine explanation, extenuation or reformation sufficiently convincing or persuasive to satisfy a court that a person guilty of such a crime should take his place as counsel at the Bar.

" But a prerequisite, in any case, would be a complete realization by the party concerned of his obligation of candour to the court in which he desired to serve as an agent of justice. The fulfilment of that obligation of candour with its attendant risks proved too painful for the appellant, and when he applied to the Board for his certificate he withheld the fact that he had been convicted.

"In those circumstances the conclusion that he is not a fit and proper person to be made a member of the Bar is confirmed.

"The third contention made in support of the appeal was that the Supreme Court did not soundly exercise its discretion to disbar the appellant. I can only say that I think that the order made was inevitable."

"For these reasons I am of opinion that the appeal must be dismissed.
