= Australian Woollen Mills Pty Ltd v Commonwealth =

Judgement of the High Court of Australia

- Court: High Court of Australia
- Full case name: Australian Woollen Mills Pty Ltd v Commonwealth
- Decided: 4 May 1954
- Citations: [1954] HCA 20; (1954) 92 CLR 424

Case history
- Appealed to: Privy Council

Court membership
- Judges sitting: Dixon CJ, Williams, Webb, Fullagar, and Kitto JJ

Australian Woollen Mills Pty Ltd v Commonwealth, is a leading Australian case regarding what is an offer that, when accepted, gives rise to a legally binding contract.

== Background ==
From 1939 and for the duration of the war, the Australian government had in place a system of price control which governed both the price of wool and the sale price in Australia of woollen garments. The first step in resuming normal practice after the war was the resumption of selling wool by auction and private sale after 30 June 1946. The price at which Australian Woollen Mills could sell its goods were fixed by the Commonwealth Prices Commissioner until 20 September 1948. From 30 June 1946, the Australian government introduced a subsidy for the purchase of wool to be manufactured into garments in Australia and sold for local consumption. In 1948, the Australian government discontinued paying the subsidy, leaving Australian Woolen Mills with a substantial amount of wool on hand, for which the subsidy had not been paid.

As a result, Australian Woollen Mills sued for breach of contract, whilst the government denied liability on the grounds that there was no legally binding contract between the parties.

== Held ==
The High Court ruled that there was no legally binding contract between the parties, as all the government had done was merely to make a statement on government policy (i.e. the subsidy), which alone was not an offer capable of acceptance.

The Court stated "what is alleged to be an offer should have been intended to give rise, on the doing of the act, to an obligation ... in the absence of such an intention, actual or imputed, and alleged "offer" cannot lead to a contract: there is, indeed, in such a case no true "offer"."

== Privy Council ==
The Privy Council gave Australian Woolen Mills special leave to appeal, however dismissed the appeal, agreeing with the High Court that there was no contract to pay a subsidy.
