= Australian Broadcasting Tribunal v Bond =

Judgement of the High Court of Australia

- Court: High Court of Australia
- Full case name: AUSTRALIAN BROADCASTING TRIBUNAL v. BOND AND OTHERS
- Decided: 1990
- Citation: 170 CLR 321

Court membership
- Judges sitting: Mason C.J., Brennan, Deane, Toohey, and Gaudron JJ

Case opinions
- Appeal allowed Mason CJ, Brennan J Deane J Toohey & Gaudron JJ

Australian Broadcasting Tribunal v Bond, also known as 'Bond', is a decision of the High Court of Australia.

It is an important case in Australian Administrative Law, particularly for its writings about the meaning of a 'decision' and 'error of law'.

As of September 2020, 'Bond' is the 13th most cited case of the High Court.

== Background ==
The Australian Broadcasting Tribunal had launched an investigation into Alan Bond and companies associated with him, for the purposes of determining whether he (or any of his companies) were a 'fit and proper person' to hold a broadcasting license.

Prior to making a final decision to suspend or revoke the license, the Tribunal held an inquiry into various matters; and found that Mr Bond was guilty of improper conduct under the act. It therefore determined that he and his companies would not be ultimately found to be a fit and proper person under the act, in the interim before the final decision.

Bond and the licensees sought a review of those actions and findings.

Before the federal court and the High Court, the jurisdiction of the courts over the Tribunal's decisions were questioned. The ADJR Act allowed judicial review for a 'decision' to which the act applies, or 'conduct' for the purpose of making a decision to which the act applies.

== Judgment ==
A majority of the High Court held that generally speaking; the term 'decision' under the ADJR act entails a 'substantive determination' which is 'final, operative or determinative' of the issue or fact to be ascertained. 'conduct' under the act, refers to action of a procedural nature which may be taken as a step on the way to a decision. However, such action may amount to a 'decision' under the act if the relevant statute provided for an intermediate finding or ruling.

On the facts before the court; a majority held that the finding that Bond and the licensees were not fit and proper persons was a substantive determination; and thus reviewable under the act. However, the finding that Mr Bond was not a fit and proper person was not a reviewable 'decision', as it was merely a step on the way along to a decision; because Bond himself wasn't actually one of the licensees. Neither could that finding be challenged under the act as 'conduct', as it did not relate to the conduct of proceedings engaged in before making a 'decision'.

The High Court then refused to interfere with the finding that the licensee company was not a fit and proper person under the act. Any potential problems with that finding by the tribunal did not reach the threshold of being an 'error of law' under the act.

== See also ==
- Minister for Aboriginal Affairs v Peko-Wallsend Ltd
- Castlemaine Tooheys Ltd v South Australia
