= Norbis v Norbis =

Judgement of the High Court of Australia

- Court: High Court of Australia
- Full case name: Norbis v Norbis
- Decided: 1986
- Citation: 161 CLR 513

Court membership
- Judges sitting: Mason, Wilson, Brennan, Deane and Dawson JJ

Case opinions
- appeal allowed Mason & Deane JJ; Wilson & Dawson JJ; Brennan J

Norbis v Norbis is a decision of the High Court of Australia.

The case is important to Family Law; for its holdings concerning the correct approach when assessing parties' contributions, during a division of assets.

It is the 30th most cited case of the High Court.

== Facts ==
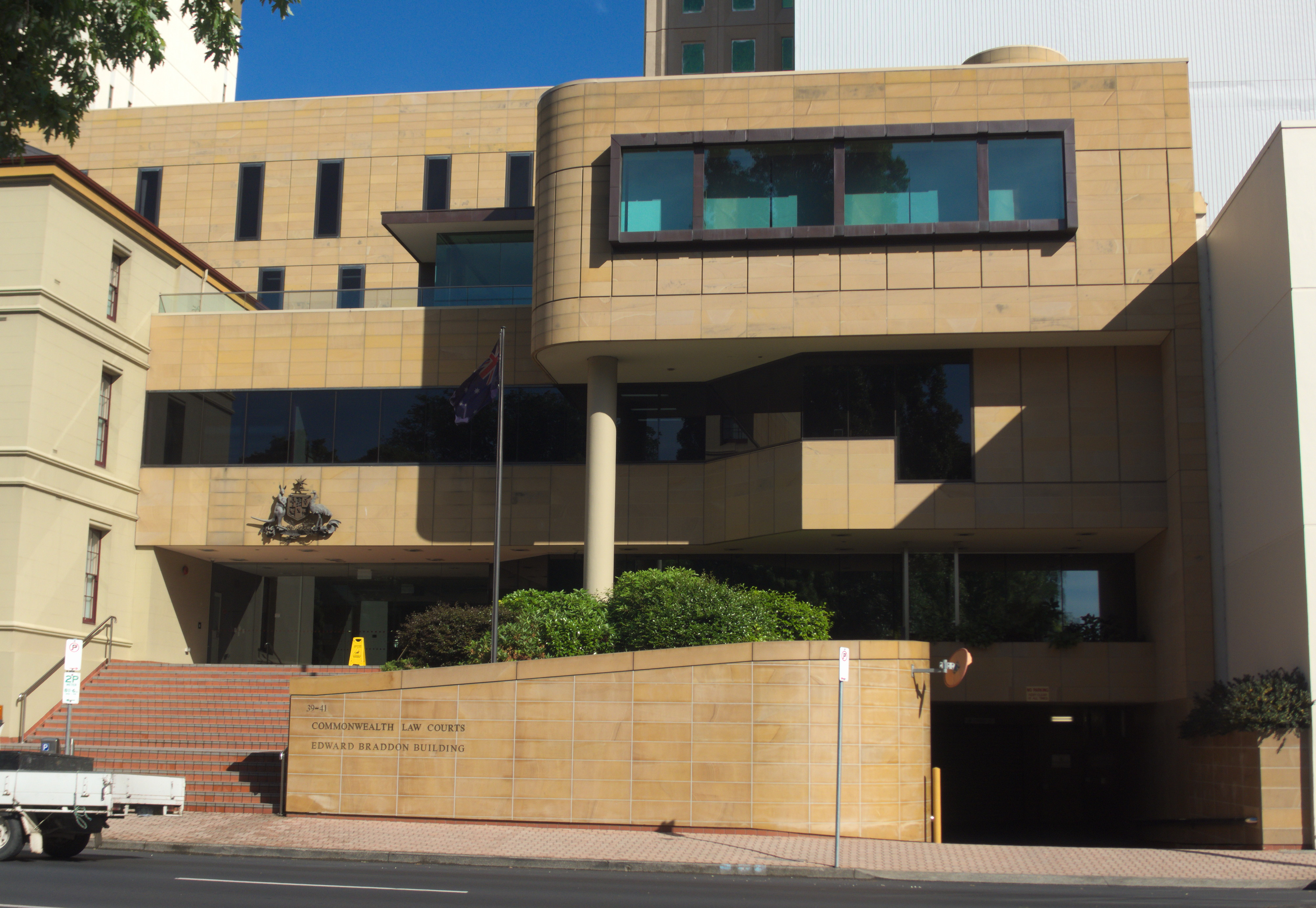
Pictured: the Family Court building in Hobart

The parties to the appeal were two people seeking divorce after a 30 year marriage. Three years after the divorce was granted, orders were made by the Family Court altering the property interests of the parties. (Note: These orders were made under s79(1) of the Family Law Act 1975 (Cth)) The overall effect of the trial judge's order was to grant the husband 60%. This figure was reached after dividing five of the couple's six major assets in favour of the husband, and one in favour of the wife.

The orders were varied upon appeal to the Full Family Court, who instead adopted a global approach to asset division. This choice of method effectively reduced the husband's entitlement to 57%.

The husband then obtained special leave before the High Court

== Judgement ==
The High Court was asked to decide whether a 'global' or 'asset by asset' calculation is the correct approach when assessing contributions to a relationship.

The Court decided to preference neither alternative. It held that the legislation did not require a certain method; and that the most appropriate method would depend on the facts. Either approach might be wholly or partially adopted depending on the circumstances.

It noted that an assessment of a homemaker's contribution would usually be done by reference to the whole of their partner's property. This would convenience a global approach being adopted to asset division in most cases.

== See also ==
- Gronow v Gronow
- List of High Court of Australia cases
