= Aston v Harlee Manufacturing Co =

Judgement of the High Court of Australia

Name
- Court: High Court of Australia
- Decided: 4 August 1960
- Citations: [1960] HCA 47, (1960) 103 CLR 391

Court membership
- Judge sitting: Fullagar J

Aston v Harlee Manufacturing Co. is a significant legal decision involving Australian trademark law. It involved separate businesses which both sought to use the Tastee Freez name in Australia.

Both men had American businesses which were planning or contemplating expansion of soft serve iced milk restaurants into Australia. Aston, formerly based in Honolulu, Hawaii, United States, was a Dairy Queen operator there who moved to Sydney. Harlee Manufacturing Co., run by its founder L. S. Maranz, was a business similar to Dairy Queen, based in Illinois, USA.

The court maintained that authorship does not require the applicant be the first and true inventor of the mark. (Aston's application for special status and use of the name first, in 1952. Notice of opposition was filed by Harlee in 1956, and its own registration application was submitted in 1957.) The court further stated that trademark registration and determining its award is a question of whether anyone else has a right to use the word prior to that of the person claiming authorship.

The court followed Shell Co of Australia Ltd v Rohm and Haas Co, that "right to registration depends...on proprietorship of a mark" but like Shell adheres to the English case In re Hudson's Trade Marks when the "trade mark...has never [been] used...at all". Shell continued that "an application to register a trade mark so far unused must, equally with a trade mark the title to which depends on prior user, be founded on...the combined effect of authorship of the mark, the intention to use it upon or in connection with the goods and the applying for registration".

Like The Seven Up Co v OT Ltd, the court would not give weight to the use of the registered mark in foreign locations.

Even though Aston deliberately copied or adopted or intended the use of the registered name from a foreign country, there was no evidence of fraud.

Further, the court decided:

When once it is conceded, as a matter of law, that a person may apply for and obtain in Australia a valid registration of a trade mark registered and used in a foreign country but not used in Australia, I do not think that exceptions and qualifications should be introduced which are based merely on conceptions of commercial ethics.
