= Bryant & Ors v Badenoch Integrated Logging Pty Ltd =

- Court: High Court of Australia
- Argued: 18 March 2022
- Decided: 8 February 2023
- Citation: [2022] HCA 177

Case history
- Prior actions: [2021] FCAFC 64 [2021] FCAFC 111

Court membership
- Judges sitting: Kiefel CJ, Gageler, Gordon, Edelman, Steward, Gleeson & Jagot JJ

Case opinions
- Appeal unanimously dismissed.

Bryant & Ors v Badenoch Integrated Logging Pty Ltd is a decision of the High Court of Australia.

The case confirmed the abolition of the 'peak indebtedness rule' for Australian corporate liquidations. The Full Federal Court had previously condemned the rule, and the High Court chose to uphold the appeals court's decision.

The peak indebtedness rule, was a previously applied common law rule that operated where a liquidator needed to identify unfair preference payments in a situation where the liquidated company and its creditor had an ongoing business account with each other (for example, an ongoing service contract). The rule allowed a liquidator to calculate the amount of an unfair preference payment by first, (1) identifying the highest amount of debt owed by the company to the creditor in the last 6 months, and then (2) assessing how much this indebtedness had been reduced by the date of the liquidation. The unfair preference at law would then be determined by obtaining the difference between these two figures.

The High Court decided that Pt 5.7B of the Corporations Act didn't incorporate the common law 'peak indebtedness rule'. It additionally held that whether a 'transaction is, for commercial purposes, an integral part of a continuing business relationship' under s588FA(3)(a) involves a factual inquiry about the 'business character' of the transaction. Some of the transactions were found to have formed part of the continuing business relationship, while others occurred after the business relationship had finished, and so did not.

It was additionally held that to be an 'unfair preference' the 'deemed single transaction' needed to reduce the indebtedness of the liquidated company to its creditor. On the case's facts, the net indebtedness of the liquidated company to its creditor increased, so no finding of an unfair preference was made.
