= R v De Simoni =

1981 High Court of Australia decision

- Court: High Court of Australia
- Full case name: THE QUEEN v. DE SIMONI
- Decided: 16 June 1981
- Citations: [1981] HCA 31, 147 CLR 383

Court membership
- Judges sitting: Gibbs C.J., Mason, Murphy, Wilson and Brennan JJ

Case opinions
- appeal allowed The trial judge did not take into account an irrelevant consideration per Gibs CJ concurring Mason J Murphy J Wilson J Brennan J

R v De Simoni is a decision of the High Court of Australia.

The case is notable for the 'De Simoni principle', a doctrine that applies to criminal sentencing law. The rule 'bars sentencing judges from relying on facts that would amount to a more serious crime than the one the offender had been convicted of'. This rule prevents, for example, a judge from relying on aggravating facts in sentencing a manslaughter conviction; if those facts would imply the offender had actually committed a more serious offence. (Note: e.g. taking into account an intention to kill, would ordinarily be disallowed in a judge's reasons to aggravate a sentence for a conviction under manslaughter. In this example it would be because that would imply the person had committed murder, a more serious crime.)

According to LawCite, it is the 128th most cited case of the High Court.

== Facts ==
Pictured: the Western Australian coat of arms, used in its courts. The De Simoni case was an appeal of sentence under the WA Criminal Code

Luciano De Simoni pleaded guilty before a judge in the District Court of Western Australia to an indictment which alleged he 'stole from one Florence Kathleen Scott with actual violence $180 in money ... '.

A conviction was entered under the WA Criminal Code for the offence of robbery. (Note: The offence of robbery was defined by s. 391 of the Criminal Code (W.A.) in the following terms: "Any person who steals anything, and, at or immediately before or immediately after the time of stealing it, uses or threatens to use actual violence to any person or property in order to obtain the thing stolen or to prevent or overcome resistance to its being stolen, is said to be guilty of robbery.") The Crown then stated the material facts to the court. They were that the victim was a woman of 78 years; at the time of the robbery the respondent struck her with a heavy blow, inflicting a 10 cm wound on the back of her head which needed eight stitches. De Simoni's counsel did not dispute this account. The trial judge then sentenced him to seven years, with a non-parole period of four years. (Note: Sentencing for robbery was set out within the Criminal Code in the following terms: "Any person who commits the crime of robbery is liable to imprisonment with hard labour for fourteen years. If the offender is armed with any dangerous or offensive weapon or instrument, ... , or if, at or immediately before or immediately after the time of the robbery, he wounds or uses any other personal violence to any person, he is liable to imprisonment with hard labour for life, with or without whipping.")

The trial judge remarked:

'In my view this is a shocking crime ... what you had done - struck from behind on the head with a piece of wood a 78-year-old woman. In my view this crime deserves punishment and substantial punishment'

De Simoni appealed, claiming that the trial judge had exceeded his available discretion. The Court of appeal allowed his appeal, but on different grounds; the court held that the facts that De Simoni had wounded his victim, was something the trial judge had taken into account; and that this circumstance of aggravation was prohibited by s582 of the WA Criminal Code. (Note: Section 582 of the Criminal Code, which deals with the form of indictments, contained the following provision: "If any circumstance of aggravation is intended to be relied upon, it must be charged in the indictment")

The state of Western Australia then appealed to the High Court.

== Judgement ==
The High Court overturned the court of appeal. It found that violence was already a factor within the sentencing provisions for robbery under the code; and that the trial judge had only taken into account the fact violence had been committed. They overturned a finding that the trial judge had taken into account the fact of the victim being wounded. However, the affirmed that if the trial judge had done so; it would have been an inappropriate consideration, as wounding would have implied a more serious offence than violent robbery.

The 'crucial question', according to the court, was whether:

'a judge can be said to rely upon a circumstance of aggravation within the meaning of s. 582, when he takes that circumstance into consideration in imposing a sentence, and by reason of it inflicts a penalty more severe than he would otherwise have imposed.'

The High Court then found for Western Australia, and remitted the matter to the Court of Criminal Appeal to give consideration to grounds it had previously excluded under s582.

== Significance ==
De Simoni is an important case in Australian sentencing law, however it has some nuances that can occasionally make it difficult to understand and apply by lower court judges. Some questions associated with the doctrine were recently considered by the High Court in Nguyen v R and Betts v R.

While the decision was based on the WA Criminal Code, the rule in De Simoni still applies in Australia's common law criminal jurisdictions. Nyugen v R for example, was an appeal of sentence for a conviction recorded in NSW.

== See also ==
- Veen v R (No 2)
