= Baxter v Commissioners of Taxation (NSW) =

Australian tax case

- Court: High Court of Australia
- Full case name: John Baxter v Commissioners of Taxation (New South Wales)
- Decided: 7 June 1907
- Citations: [1907] HCA 76, (1907) 4 CLR 1087

Case history
- Prior action: NSW District Court (unreported)

Court membership
- Judges sitting: Griffith CJ, Barton, O'Connor Isaacs & Higgins JJ

Case opinions
- 5:0 the District Court was exercising federal jurisdiction & an appeal lay directly to the High Court; 4:1 the High Court decision in Deakin v Webb was final and the High Court was not bound to follow the Privy Council in Webb v Outtrim

Flint v Webb
- Court: High Court of Australia
- Full case name: Arthur Loftus Flint v Thomas Prout Webb (Commissioner of Taxes)
- Decided: 8 June 1907
- Citations: [1907] HCA 77, (1907) 4 CLR 1178

Case history
- Prior action: Court of Petty Sessions of Victoria (unreported)

Court membership
- Judges sitting: Griffith CJ, Barton, O'Connor Isaacs & Higgins JJ

Case opinions
- 5:0 inconsistent decisions between the High Court and the Privy Council was inconvient but not a sufficient reason to issue a certificate under s 74 of the Constitutiotn to permit an appeal to the Privy Council

Commissioners of Taxation v Baxter
- Court: Privy Council
- Full case name: The Commissioners of Taxation for New South Wales v Baxter; Webb (Commissioner of Taxes for Victoria) v Crouch & Flint
- Decided: 14 January 1908
- Citations: [1908] UKPC 1, [1908] AC 214; [1908] UKPCHCA 1, (1908) 5 CLR 398

Court membership
- Judges sitting: Lord Loreburn LC, Earl of Halsbury, Lord Macnaghten, Lord Robertson, Lord Atkinson, Lord Collins & Sir Arthur Wilson

Case opinions
- Special leave refused as the controversy cannot be raised again.

Baxter v Commissioners of Taxation (NSW), and Flint v Webb, were the last of a series of cases concerning whether the States could tax the income of a Commonwealth officer which had resulted in conflict between the High Court and the Privy Council. The two cases were heard together, however two separate judgments were issued with Baxter v Commissioners of Taxation (NSW) addressing the substantive issues, and Flint v Webb addressing the applications for a certificate to appeal to the Privy Council. The judgement of Griffith CJ in Flint v Webb suggested two ways in which that conflict could be resolved. Both suggestions were adopted by the Commonwealth Parliament by legislation that permitted the States to tax the income of a Commonwealth officer, and gave the High Court exclusive appellate jurisdiction on such constitutional questions. The constitutional foundation of the decision was overturned by the subsequent decision of the High Court in the 1920 Engineers' case.

== Background ==
The ability of a state to tax the income of a Commonwealth officer was one of the "constitutional loose ends" about the nature of the federal system and the legislative powers of the new Commonwealth that remained unresolved following the debates in the constitutional conventions.

=== The High Court and the Privy Council ===
One of the issues debated in the drafting of the Constitution was the respective roles of the High Court and the Privy Council. The draft constitution that was put to voters in the various colonies was that there was to be no appeal to the Privy Council in any matter involving the interpretation of the Constitution or of the Constitution of a State, unless it involved the interests of some other dominion. This was not acceptable to the British, who insisted on a compromise. Section 74 as ultimately enacted by the Imperial Parliament provided that if the dispute was between the Commonwealth and a State as to the extent of their respective powers under the Constitution, there could only be an appeal from the High Court to the Privy Council if the High Court granted a certificate "that the question is one which ought to be determined by Her Majesty in Council". It was anticipated that this may give rise to conflict between the High Court and the Privy Council because the Privy Council could still hear an appeal directly from a state court. The view that was supported in the House of Lords was that the view of the Privy Council would prevail "as it was the decision of Her Majesty herself as the fountain of justice, administering justice throughout her Empire at home and abroad.

One of the consequences of the concurrent appellate jurisdiction of the High Court and the Privy Council was that it was the unsuccessful litigant in the Supreme Court who had the choice of jurisdiction and the Commonwealth had no direct power to limit appeals from a State Supreme Court as the Constitutional limitation only applied to appeals from the High Court. The way in which the Commonwealth dealt with this issue in the Judiciary Act 1903, was by section 30 which gave the High Court "original jurisdiction in all matters arising under the Constitution or involving its interpretation", sections 38 and 39 then removed the jurisdiction of the State Courts on such matters, but then gave it back to them in section 39 under the guise of Federal jurisdiction in which there was no appeal to the Privy Council and instead only an appeal to the High Court.

=== Wollaston's case in the Supreme Court of Victoria ===
The Full Court of the Supreme Court, Madden CJ, Williams & à Beckett JJ, had held in 1902 that Dr Harry Wollaston was required to pay Victorian income tax in relation to the salary he received as the Commonwealth Comptroller-General of Customs. The Court considered and rejected the applicability of decisions of the Supreme Court of the United States in the interpretation of the Constitution of Australia, in particular the decision in McCulloch v. Maryland, Instead the Supreme Court applied the Privy Council decision in The Bank of Toronto v Lambe, holding that the Privy Council had refused to apply the principle from McCulloch v Maryland and that it cannot govern the construction of the Australian Constitution.

=== D'Emden v Pedder in the High Court ===
The High Court held in D'Emden v Pedder that the salary receipts of federal government employees were not subject to state stamp duty. Wollaston's case was cited in argument, as that the applicability of the principle in McCulloch v Maryland, to the Constitution was negatived by the decision of the Privy Council in The Bank of Toronto v Lambe. In response Griffith CJ stated "The decision in the case of The Bank of Toronto v Lambe merely amounts to this-that under sec. 92 [of the Constitution of Canada] the Provinces have the power of direct taxation". The judgement of the Court, delivered by Griffith CJ, did not refer to Wollaston's case nor The Bank of Toronto v Lambe and instead held that "some, if not all, of the framers of that Constitution were familiar, not only with the Constitution of the United States, but with that of the Canadian Dominion and those of the British colonies. When, therefore, under these circumstances, we find embodied, in the Constitution provisions undistinguishable in substance, though varied in form, from provisions of the Constitution of the United States which had long since been judicially interpreted by the Supreme Court of that Republic, it is not an unreasonable inference that its framers intended that like provisions should receive like interpretation." The Court subsequently described the Constitution as "framed in Australia by Australians, and for the use of the Australian people". The three inaugural judges of the High Court had been leading participants in the Constitutional Conventions and all are properly seen as among the framers of the Constitution, thus when the Court spoke of what was framers of the Constitution knew or intended their Honours are referring to their personal experience in that process, and not to the intention or knowledge of the Imperial Parliament in passing the Commonwealth of Australia Constitution Act 1900.

The Court held that, consistent with McCulloch v Maryland the Australian Constitution contained an implied immunity of instrumentalities, where neither the Commonwealth nor State governments could be affected by the laws of the other.

=== Deakin v Webb in the High Court ===
In Deakin v Webb the High Court adhered to what it had said D'Emden v Pedder, that the principles to be applied in interpreting the Australian Constitution, as to the respective powers of the Commonwealth and the States, were substantially the same as those laid down in McCulloch v Maryland. Their Honours rejected the assertion that there was a preference for American decisions, or any disregard for British decisions, instead holding that the distinction was based on the deliberate adoption by the framers of the Australian Constitution of the language of the United States Constitution and a rejection of the scheme of the Canadian Constitution. Each of the Judges rejected an application for a certificate to appeal to the Privy Council, finding that the determination of Constitutional questions was the responsibility of the High Court.

=== Webb v Outtrim in the Privy Council ===
The Victorian Commissioner of Taxes did not accept the decision of the High Court and assessed the taxable income of Mr Outram as including the salary he received from the Commonwealth as the Deputy Postmaster-General. The Supreme Court of Victoria followed the decision of the High Court in Deakin v Webb. As the unsuccessful litigant, the Commissioner of Taxes sought leave to appeal to the Privy Council rather than the High Court. Hodges J held that the Supreme Court of Victoria had power under the Order in Council of 9 June 1860 to grant leave to appeal to the Privy Council, and that the Commonwealth Parliament had no power to take away this right of appeal.

The Privy Council held in Webb v Outtrim that a State government could tax Commonwealth officials and criticised the decisions of the High Court in D'Emden v Pedder and Deakin v Webb. Their Lordships held that the relevant question was not the intention of the Australians who framed the Constitution, but rather what the British Parliament had in mind when it passed the Constitution Act.

== Baxter v Commissioners of Taxation (NSW) ==
The question returned to the High Court in May 1907. The two cases were heard together, however the judgment in Baxter v Commissioners of Taxation (NSW) addressed the substantive issues. The decision of the Privy Council in Webb v Outtrim had been followed by Murray DCJ in the NSW District Court, finding that Baxter was liable to pay NSW income tax in respect of his salary as a Customs officer. Similarly the Court of Petty Sessions of Victoria had followed the Privy Council and had found that Flint was liable to pay Victorian income tax in respect of his salary in the Postmaster-General's Department. Both Baxter and Flint appealed directly to the High Court. The Commissioners of Taxation objected to three of the Justices hearing the case as the decision would directly affect their interests as residents of NSW. Griffith CJ overruled the objection, holding it was a case of necessity as every Justice would have the same interest.

=== An appeal direct to the High Court ===
The Court held that District Court and Court of Petty Sessions were exercising federal jurisdiction pursuant to section 39 of the Judiciary Act, such that section 73 of the Constitution, gave the High Court jurisdiction to hear the appeals.

=== Which court is the ultimate arbiter ===
The High Court held that it was, in the absence of a certificate under s 74 of the Constitution, the ultimate arbiter on all questions concerning the respective powers of the Commonwealth and the States such that it was not bound to follow the decision of the Privy Council in Webb v Outtrim. The High Court reconsidered the position, but reaffirmed its decision in D'Emden v Pedder. Griffith CJ delivered the "rather pugnacious judgment" of the majority as follows :

It was common knowledge [at the time of Federation], not only that the decisions of the Judicial Committee in the Canadian cases had not given widespread satisfaction, but also that the Constitution of the United States was a subject entirely unfamiliar to English lawyers, while to Australian publicists it was almost as familiar as the British Constitution. It was known that, even if there should be any members of the Judicial Committee familiar with the subject, it was quite uncertain whether they would form members of a Board that might be called upon to determine a question on appeal from an Australian Court, by which it must necessarily be dealt with in the first instance. It could not be predicted of the Board, which would sit to entertain an appeal, that it would be constituted with any regard to the special familiarity of its members with the subject. And no disrespect is implied in saying that the eminent lawyers who constituted the Judicial Committee were not regarded either as being familiar with the history or conditions of the remoter portions of the Empire, or as having any sympathetic understanding of the aspirations of the younger communities which had long enjoyed the privilege of self-government. On the other hand, the founders of the Australian Constitution were familiar with the part which the Supreme Court of the United States, constituted of Judges imbued with the spirit of American nationality, and knowing that the nation must work out its own destiny under the Constitution as framed, or as amended from time to time, had played in the development of the nation, and the harmonious working of its political institutions.

=== Implied immunity ===
The High Court reconsidered its decision in Deakin v Webb giving the opinion of the Privy Council in Webb v Outtrim all the weight it deserves. The majority noted that NSW and Victoria were now seeking to overturn their success in the Railway Servants' case. The majority held that the Privy Council did not appear to have considered the first line of reasoning from Deakin v Webb that an attribute of sovereignty was that the only interference with the Commonwealth's powers was that prescribed in the Constitution.

The second line of reasoning concerned the similarity between the relevant provisions of the United States and Australian constitutions. The majority attributed the opinion of the Privy Council to a lack of familiarity with the subject and a lack of assistance from the British counsel who appeared for the respondents. Part of the criticism of Webb v Outtrim by the majority was by reference to the statement that "The American Union, on the other hand, has erected a tribunal which possesses jurisdiction to annul a Statute upon the ground that it is unconstitutional" The majority pointed out that the United States Constitution contains no express provision to endow the Supreme Court with special powers, and the relevant provisions were identical with those creating the High Court in Australia.

=== Can the States tax the income of a Commonwealth officer ===
The success of the argument put by Higgins KC on behalf of his clients in Deakin v Webb did not sit well with him, writing in 1905 that "The man in the street is startled and puzzled. He sees a public official, enjoying a regular salary in the postal department, paying the Victorian income-tax until federation, and then suddenly exempted from the tax because the post-office has passed over to federal control." Having been appointed to the High Court along with Isaacs J in 1906, Higgins J set out his dissenting views in Baxter v Commissioners of Taxation (NSW) that:

It is true that I have held, and still hold, a strong opinion with regard to the judgment of Marshall CJ in McCulloch v Maryland – the judgment on which Deakin v Webb was based – although I utter the opinion with a feeling that it will be regarded by some as almost blasphemy. I regard it as being the utterance rather of the statesman than of the lawyer.

== Flint v Webb ==
The judgment in Flint v Webb addressed the applications for a certificate to appeal to the Privy Council. The Court unanimously declined to issue a certificate to appeal to the Privy Council, with each judge finding that the fact that there was a decision of the Privy Council that was inconsistent with a previous decision of the High Court, where the High Court had refused a certificate of appeal, was inconvenient, but that was not itself a sufficient reason to grant a certificate. Griffith CJ suggested two ways to escape the inconvenient position, (1) make the appellate jurisdiction of the High Court on federal matters exclusive of the State Supreme Court or (2) legislate that the income provided to federal public servants was subject to the rights of the States to tax them. Higgins J described the suggestion that the Commonwealth be deprived of the appellate assistance of the very efficient State Courts as an extreme step. His Honour doubted that the issue could be resolved by federal legislation given that the majority's view in Deakin v Webb rested on constitutional grounds and the federal Parliament had no power to alter the constitution.

== Aftermath ==
=== Legislative response ===
The decisions of the High Court in Baxter v Commissioners of Taxation (NSW) and Flint v Webb were handed down in June 1907. In September the federal Parliament responded to the conflict, adopting both measures identified by Griffith CJ, passing the Commonwealth Salaries Act 1907, which dealt with the substantive dispute by expressly permitting the States to tax the income of Commonwealth officers, and the Judiciary Act 1907, which gave the High Court exclusive jurisdiction "in matters involving any question, howsoever arising, as to the limits inter se of the constitutional powers of the Commonwealth and those of any State or States, or as to the limits inter se of the constitutional power of any two or more of the States". The practical effect of the Judiciary Act amendment was that as no State Court could give a decision on an inter se question, there was no decision to appeal to the Privy Council other than one from the High Court and that required a certificate from the High Court.

=== Commissioners of Taxation v Baxter in the Privy Council ===
Despite the failure to obtain certificates under s 74 of the Constitution, the NSW and Victorian commissioners of taxation sought leave to appeal to the Privy Council. The decision of the Privy Council did not address the need for a certificate to appeal and instead declined special leave to appeal primarily on the grounds that the Commonwealth Salaries Act meant the controversy could not arise again.

== Subsequent developments ==
The Commonwealth introduced its own income tax in 1915, to help fund Australia's war effort in the First World War. By the end of the war, the Commonwealth revenue was three times that of the combined revenue of the States. Having found that the imposition of income tax by the States was an attempted interference with the sovereign powers of the Commonwealth, the mutuality of immunity established in the Railway Servants' case, meant that the Commonwealth had no power to levy an income tax on the salaries of State officers. In 1920, following changes in the composition of the High Court, Railway Servants' case, was overturned in the Engineers' case,

Despite the policy of the Australian Labor Party from 1908 that appeals to the Privy Council should be abolished, it took no legislative action to implement that policy, and appeals to the Privy Council never became a major political issue. There were calls among lawyers and academics in the 1950s for the abolition of such appeals, however there was no legislative response until 1968, abolishing appeals in matters involving federal legislation, in 1975, abolishing almost all appeals from the High Court, and in 1986 which abolished appeals from State Courts.

The mechanism by which the Parliament sought to prevent appeals to the Privy Council, by way of section 39 of the Judiciary Act, has the effect that "where a matter which would otherwise be within the jurisdiction of a State court answers the description of a matter within s 75 or s 76 of the Constitution, the State court is invested with federal jurisdiction with respect to that matter to the exclusion of State jurisdiction under s 109 of the Constitution." Because federal jurisdiction can only be invested in a court, it means that a State tribunal, such as the NSW Civil and Administrative Tribunal, cannot determine disputes between residents of different States.

== See also ==
- Australian constitutional law
- List of High Court of Australia cases
