= Pirrie v McFarlane =

Australian court case

- Court: High Court of Australia
- Decided: 24 August 1925
- Citations: [1925] HCA 30, (1925) 36 CLR 170

Court membership
- Judges sitting: Knox CJ, Isaacs, Higgins, Rich and Starke JJ

Case opinions
- Decision by: Knox CJ
- Concurrence: Higgins and Starke JJ
- Dissent: Isaacs and Rich JJ

Keywords
- Federalism; Intergovernmental immunity

Pirrie v McFarlane is a landmark decision of the High Court of Australia on Intergovernmental immunity between tiers of government in the Australian Constitution.

== Facts ==
The defendant Thomas McFarlane was prosecuted under sec. 6 of the Motor Car Act 1915 (Victoria) as he drove a motor-car upon a public highway without being licensed. McFarlane’s defence was that as a duly enlisted member of the Royal Australian Air Force and that on the occasion in question he was on duty driving a car belonging to the Air Force, under orders from his superior officer, was thus on Air Force business.

The Police Magistrate dismissed the case, ruling that D'Emden v Pedder applied. The Supreme Court of Victoria declined to hear the case, as it involved a question as to the limits inter se of the constitutional powers of the State and the Commonwealth, leaving it to be considered by the High Court under s. 40A of the Judiciary Act 1903, which at that time stated:

40A (1). When, in any cause pending in the Supreme Court of a State, there arises any question as to the limits inter se of the constitutional powers of the Commonwealth and those of any State or States, or as to the limits inter se of the constitutional powers of any two or more States, it shall be the duty of the Court to proceed no further in the cause, and the cause shall be by virtue of this Act, and without any order of the High Court, removed to the High Court.

== Issues ==
Three questions needed to be considered by the High Court, before the case could be reviewed:

1. Was s. 40A a valid exercise of the legislative power of the Commonwealth?
2. If so, was the application to the Supreme Court to make absolute the order nisi to review a "cause pending in the Supreme Court"?
3. If so, did there arise in that cause a question as to the limits inter se of the constitutional powers of the Commonwealth and those of a State?

== Decision ==
The High Court unanimously agreed that s. 40A was valid, and that the Court could properly deal with the appeal at hand. It also held, by 3-2, that the State road laws did apply, the majority finding that ‘a soldier is also a citizen’.

The minority relied partly on the exclusivity of the defence power, under Constitution s 51(vi), and partly on a perception that Commonwealth personnel generally have ‘special duties, rights and immunities that are outside the scope of ordinary citizenship.'

The finding retained the constitutional interpretation that both levels of government could be subject to interference by the other, and that neither was absolutely immune from the other's laws. Knox CJ declared:

It follows from the opinion expressed by the majority of the Court in the Engineers' Case, that in the present case the defendant can derive no assistance from the doctrine of implied immunity of Federal instrumentalities nor can he rely on the decision in D'Emden v. Pedder, unless he can establish that sec. 6 of the [Victorian Act] is, if applied to him, inconsistent with a law of the Commonwealth. In my opinion he has failed to establish this.... ...The Commonwealth Parliament has, in my opinion, undoubted power, by legislation with respect to a subject which is within the ambit of its legislative powers, to override the provisions of any State law, but in the absence of any such enactment the State law must be given its full effect.

== Aftermath ==
The case had also been appealed to the Judicial Committee of the Privy Council, which subsequently declined to pursue the matter, declaring that "the basis of the appeal has disappeared, and the other questions which are raised upon it, interesting as they might prove to be, have become academic so far as this case is concerned."

== See also ==
States rights

Henderson v Defence Housing Authority.
