= Victoria v Commonwealth (1971) =

Australian Payroll Tax case

- Court: High Court of Australia
- Full case name: Victoria v The Commonwealth
- Decided: 14 May 1971
- Citation: (1971) 122 CLR 353

Case history
- Prior action: none
- Subsequent action: none

Court membership
- Judges sitting: Barwick CJ, McTiernan, Menzies, Windeyer, Owen, Walsh and Gibbs JJ

Case opinions
- (7:0) The imposition of payroll taxes on the state government as an employer is a valid exercise of the federal taxation power (per Barwick CJ, McTiernan, Menzies, Windeyer, Owen, Walsh and Gibbs JJ)

Victoria v Commonwealth (1971) 122 CLR 353, commonly referred to as the Payroll Tax Case, was a case decided in the High Court of Australia regarding the scope of the Commonwealth's taxation power and the extent to which it can burden a state's structural integrity.

== Background ==
The Commonwealth passed the Payroll Tax Act, which imposed a 2.5% tax on all wages paid by an employer. It also applied to all state employers.

The Act was challenged on the grounds that it breached the Melbourne Corporation principles limiting the extent to which the Commonwealth can burden states.

== Decision ==
The court held that the Act was a valid one under the 'Melbourne Corporation' two-limbed principle. The majority spoke about the implications that could be drawn from the constitution. This came from the fact that the constitution contemplates the existence of the states. A law that fundamentally restricts their exercise of essential functions would go against the implication of the continued existence of the states.

Windeyer J notes that the increased entry of the Commonwealth in areas of concurrent federal and state power was foreseen early on, and the progressive increased fiscal power of the Commonwealth was indicative of this notion. The states in the process of Federation agreed willingly to become a single federal entity giving up some of their powers without gaining any new ones. The gradual centralisation of power in the Commonwealth grew from this process. This view is particularly persuasive in the environment after Engineers which swept away reserved State powers and the doctrine of intergovernmental immunity.

== See also ==
- Australian constitutional law
