= Deakin v Webb =

Australian legal case concerning tax

- Court: High Court of Australia
- Full case name: Alfred Deakin v Thomas Prout Webb (Commissioner of Taxes); Sir William Lyne v Thomas Prout Webb (Commissioner of Taxes)
- Decided: 3 November 1904
- Citations: [1904] HCA 57, (1904) 1 CLR 585

Case history
- Prior actions: In re the Income Tax Acts (No 4) (Deakin's & Lyne's cases) [1904] VicLawRp 105, (1904) 29 VLR 748

Court membership
- Judges sitting: Griffith CJ, Barton & O'Connor JJ

Case opinions
- 3:0 the States could not tax the income of a Commonwealth officer

Deakin v Webb was one of a series of cases concerning whether the States could tax the income of a Commonwealth officer. The High Court of Australia overruled a decision of the Supreme Court of Victoria, holding that the States could not tax the income of a Commonwealth officer. This resulted in conflict with the Privy Council that was ultimately resolved by the passage of Commonwealth law in 1907 to permit the States to tax the income of a Commonwealth officer. The constitutional foundation of the decision was overturned by the subsequent decision of the High Court in the 1920 Engineers' Case.

== Background ==
The ability of a state to tax the income of a Commonwealth officer was one of the "constitutional loose ends" about the nature of the federal system and the legislative powers of the new Commonwealth that remained unresolved following the debates in the constitutional conventions.

=== The High Court and the Privy Council ===
One of the issues debated in the drafting of the Constitution was the respective roles of the High Court and the Privy Council. The draft constitution that was put to voters in the various colonies was that there was to be no appeal to the Privy Council in any matter involving the interpretation of the Constitution or of the Constitution of a State, unless it involved the interests of some other dominion. This was not acceptable to the British, who insisted on a compromise. Section 74 as ultimately enacted by the Imperial Parliament provided that if the dispute was between the Commonwealth and a state as to the extent of their respective powers under the Constitution, there could only be an appeal from the High Court to the Privy Council if the High Court granted a certificate "that the question is one which ought to be determined by Her Majesty in Council". It was anticipated that this may give rise to conflict between the High Court and the Privy Council because the Privy Council could still hear an appeal directly from a state court. The view that was supported in the House of Lords was that the view of the Privy Council would prevail "as it was the decision of Her Majesty herself as the fountain of justice, administering justice throughout her Empire at home and abroad.

One of the consequences of the concurrent appellate jurisdiction of the High Court and the Privy Council was that it was the unsuccessful litigant in the Supreme Court who had the choice of jurisdiction and the Commonwealth had no direct power to limit appeals from a State Supreme Court as the Constitutional limitation only applied to appeals from the High Court. The way in which the Commonwealth dealt with this issue in the Judiciary Act 1903, was by section 30, which gave the High Court "original jurisdiction in all matters arising under the Constitution or involving its interpretation", sections 38 and 39 then removed the jurisdiction of the State Courts on such matters, but then gave it back to them in section 39 under the guise of Federal jurisdiction in which there was no appeal to the Privy Council and instead only an appeal to the High Court.

=== Wollaston's case ===
The Full Court of the Supreme Court, Madden CJ, Williams & à Beckett JJ, had held in 1902 that Dr Harry Wollaston was required to pay Victorian income tax in relation to the salary he received as the Commonwealth Comptroller-General of Customs. The Court considered and rejected the applicability of decisions of the Supreme Court of the United States in the interpretation of the Constitution of Australia, in particular the decision in McCulloch v. Maryland, Instead the Supreme Court applied the Privy Council decision in The Bank of Toronto v Lambe, holding that the Privy Council had refused to apply the principle from McCulloch v Maryland and that it cannot govern the construction of the Australian Constitution.

=== D'Emden v Pedder ===
The High Court held in D'Emden v Pedder that the salary receipts of federal government employees were not subject to state stamp duty. Wollaston's case was cited in argument, as that the applicability of the principle in McCulloch v Maryland, to the Constitution was negatived by the decision of the Privy Council in The Bank of Toronto v Lambe. In response Griffith CJ stated "The decision in the case of The Bank of Toronto v Lambe merely amounts to this – that under sec. 92 [of the Constitution of Canada] the Provinces have the power of direct taxation". The judgement of the Court, delivered by Griffith CJ, did not refer to Wollaston's case nor The Bank of Toronto v Lambe and instead held that "that some, if not all, of the framers of that Constitution were familiar, not only with the Constitution of the United States, but with that of the Canadian Dominion and those of the British colonies. When, therefore, under these circumstances, we find embodied, in the Constitution provisions undistinguishable in substance, though varied in form, from provisions of the Constitution of the United States which had long since been judicially interpreted by the Supreme Court of that Republic, it is not an unreasonable inference that its framers intended that like provisions should receive like interpretation." The Court subsequently described the Constitution as "framed in Australia by Australians, and for the use of the Australian people". The three inaugural judges of the High Court had been leading participants in the Constitutional Conventions and all are properly seen as among the framers of the Constitution, thus when the Court spoke of what was framers of the Constitution knew or intended their Honours are referring to their personal experience in that process, and not to the intention or knowledge of the Imperial Parliament in passing the Commonwealth of Australia Constitution Act 1900.

=== Webb v Deakin & Lyne in the Supreme Court ===
The question again arose in relation to the incomes of members of the Australian Parliament. In assessing the income of Alfred Deakin and Sir William Lyne, the Victorian Commissioner of Taxes had included their salaries as members of parliament, £233, and as Ministers, £1,650. Deakin lived in Victoria and was the member for Ballaarat. He was also the Attorney-General under then Prime Minister Barton. Lyne lived in New South Wales and was the member for Hume and in 1902 was the Minister for Home Affairs. At the time Parliament sat in Melbourne and so he was required to be in Melbourne whenever Parliament was sitting. Deakin and Lyne objected to the assessment and the Commissioner stated cases for the opinion of the Supreme Court as to whether the assessments were correct to include Commonwealth salaries and this was again referred to the Full Court. The outcome of the case would directly affect the interests of both Barton J and O'Connor J as they were in essentially the same position as Lyne, having previously been members of parliament and living in NSW. The issue would also affect any High Court judge, as the same question would arise when the High Court was sitting in Melbourne, as it did in this case.

In essence, the question for the Supreme Court of Victoria was whether they followed their earlier decision in Wollaston's case or whether they adopted the approach of the High Court in D'Emden v Pedder. In the Supreme Court, the Commissioner was represented by Isaacs KC, while Deakin and Lyne were represented by Higgins KC. The Full Court, Madden CJ, à Beckett & Hodges JJ, decided to follow their earlier decision in Wollaston's case, holding that "As to the applicability of the United States cases, the opinions of the learned Judges in D'Emden v Pedder which apparently lean towards such applicability are merely dicta, and incomplete dicta at that, and we do not regard them therefore as binding upon us." The Court noted the issue as to the ultimate court of appeal, stating that the Privy Council was "at least a concurrent Court of ultimate appeal with the High Court", and the final ascertainment of the law on the matter would depend on the relation of one Court to the other.

== Argument ==
In the High Court Deakin and Lyne continued to be represented by Higgins KC, apparently in his capacity as the then Attorney-General, and the Commissioner continued to be represented by Isaacs KC. The argument recorded in the Commonwealth Law Reports does not set out any objection that the decision would directly affect the interests of the judges. The arguments for Deakin and Lyne were that their salaries were not earned in Victoria, but in Australia as a whole. The tax was unlawful as an interference between an officer of the Commonwealth and the Government. The Commissioner argued that income tax was a personal obligation that did not depend upon the source of the income being from the Commonwealth, the Income Tax Act 1895 was a valid Act in 1895 and did not become invalid as a result of the passage of the Constitution.

== Decision of the High Court ==
On the principles of interpretation, the Court adhered to what it had said D'Emden v Pedder, that the principles to be applied in interpreting the Australian Constitution, so far as regards the respective powers of the Commonwealth and the States were substantially the same as those laid down in McCulloch v Maryland. The Court described the judgement of the Supreme Court of Victoria as "a somewhat novel mode of dealing with a judgment of a Court of final appeal". Their Honours rejected the assertion that there was a preference for American decisions, or any disregard for British decisions, instead holding that the distinction was based on the deliberate adoption by the framers of the Australian Constitution of the language of the United States Constitution and a rejection of the scheme of the Canadian Constitution.

=== Certificate under s 74 ===
This case was considered to be a dispute between the Commonwealth and a State as to the extent of their respective powers under the Constitution. As such there could only be an appeal to the Privy Council if the High Court granted a certificate "that the question is one which ought to be determined by Her Majesty in Council". It was argued for the Commissioner of Taxes that the question was one of importance to the states and desire of the people of the states, expressed through the state premiers, was that the Privy Council should deal with the matter. Each of the judges rejected the application, finding that the determination of constitutional questions was the responsibility of the High Court.

== Webb v Outtrim in the Privy Council ==
Webb v Outtrim
- Court: Privy Council
- Decided: 6 December 1906
- Citations: [1906] UKPC 75, [1907] AC 81; [1906] UKPCHCA 4, (1906) 4 CLR 356

Case history
- Prior actions: In re the Income Tax Acts (No 4) (Outtrim's case) [1905] VicLawRp 69, [1905] VLR 463

Court membership
- Judges sitting: Earl of Halsbury, Lord Macnaghten, Sir Arthur Wilson & Sir Alfred Wills

Case opinions
- an officer of the Commonwealth resident in Victoria, where he earns and receives his salary as such officer, is liable to assessment under the Income Tax Acts of Victoria. The Commonwealth Parliament has no power to take away the right of appeal to the Privy Council given by the Order in Council of 9 June 1860.

The Victorian Commissioner of Taxes did not accept the decision of the High Court and assessed the taxable income of Mr Outram as including the salary he received from the Commonwealth as the Deputy Postmaster-General. The Supreme Court of Victoria followed the decision of the High Court in Deakin v Webb. As the unsuccessful litigant, the Commissioner of Taxes sought leave to appeal to the Privy Council rather than the High Court. Hodges J held that the Supreme Court of Victoria had power under the Order in Council of 9 June 1860 to grant leave to appeal to the Privy Council, and that the Commonwealth Parliament had no power to take away this right of appeal.

The only Australian counsel involved in the appeal was Bernhard Wise KC who was led by Sir Robert Finlay for the Commissioner of Taxes.

The Privy Council held that a State government could tax Commonwealth officials and criticised the decisions of the High Court in D'Emden v Pedder and Deakin v Webb. Their Lordships held that the relevant question was not the intention of the Australians who framed the Constitution, but rather what the British Parliament had in mind when it passed the Constitution Act.

The opinion of the Privy Council states that "The American Union, on the other hand, has erected a tribunal which possesses jurisdiction to annul a Statute upon the ground that it is unconstitutional" The basis for this statement is unclear as the United States Constitution contains no express provision to endow the Supreme Court of the United States with special powers and the relevant provisions were identical with those creating the High Court in Australia. There is nothing in the opinion to suggest the Privy Council had been referred to the decision in Marbury v. Madison that asserted such jurisdiction, a decision that was at the time controversial.

The judgement held that an Act of Parliament could be held to be inoperative to the extent it was repugnant to an Imperial Act extending to the Colony, but otherwise "no authority exists by which its validity can be questioned or impeached". Despite this the judgment stated that no State of the Australian Commonwealth has the power of independent legislation possessed by the States of the American Union because every Act of the Victorian Council and Assembly requires the assent of the Crown. The Privy Council then went on to hold that sections of the Judiciary Act (Cth) were themselves invalid.

=== Criticism of the Privy Council decision ===
The decision of the Privy Council has been criticised in Australia on the basis that the constitutional question was one upon which the decision of the High Court should have been final and that the Privy Council should have respected the spirit of the Constitution and avoided conflict with the High Court. In 1957 a proponent for abolishing appeals to the Privy Council described it as an egregious blunder, stating "Even the most fervent admirer of the erudition (sic) of the Judicial Committee, even the most ardent believer in the strength of this 'bond of empire', is hardly likely to be impressed by the judgment delivered by Lord Halsbury in the name of the Committee. Halsbury's name is associated with a number of judgments of dubious value; but if he were responsible for preparing as well as pronouncing the statement of reasons in Webb v Outtrim, it can only be said that on this occasion even Halsbury surpassed himself in the puerility of some of his reasons and in his fantastic ignorance of the working of a federation under the Crown".

Even the reply from a supporter of the Privy Council described it as "perhaps the worst decision ever given by an ultimate court of appeal", which the author attributed to dealing with a system of law which differed markedly from that in which the members of the tribunal and almost all counsel had spent their professional life.

== Aftermath ==
=== Return to the High Court ===
The question returned to the High Court in May 1907 in two cases heard together, Baxter v Commissioners of Taxation (NSW), in which the judgement addressed the substantive issue, and Flint v Webb, which addressed the applications for a certificate to appeal to the Privy Council. The decision of the Privy Council in Webb v Outtrim had been followed by Murray DCJ in the NSW District Court, finding that Baxter was liable to pay NSW income tax in respect of his salary as a Customs officer. Similarly the Court of Petty Sessions of Victoria had followed the Privy Council and had found that Flint was liable to pay Victorian income tax in respect of his salary in the Postmaster-General's Department. Both Baxter and Flint appealed directly to the High Court. The Court held that these appeals concerned an inter se question such that an appeal lay to the High Court. The High Court held that it was, in the absence of a certificate under s 74 of the Constitution, the ultimate arbiter on all inter se questions such that it was not bound to follow the decision of the Privy Council in Webb v Outtrim. The High Court reconsidered the position, but reaffirmed its decision in D'Emden v Pedder. Griffith CJ delivered the "rather pugnacious judgment" of the majority as follows :

It was common knowledge [at the time of Federation], not only that the decisions of the Judicial Committee in the Canadian cases had not given widespread satisfaction, but also that the Constitution of the United States was a subject entirely unfamiliar to English lawyers, while to Australian publicists it was almost as familiar as the British Constitution. It was known that, even if there should be any members of the Judicial Committee familiar with the subject, it was quite uncertain whether they would form members of a Board that might be called upon to determine a question on appeal from an Australian Court, by which it must necessarily be dealt with in the first instance. It could not be predicted of the Board, which would sit to entertain an appeal, that it would be constituted with any regard to the special familiarity of its members with the subject. And no disrespect is implied in saying that the eminent lawyers who constituted the Judicial Committee were not regarded either as being familiar with the history or conditions of the remoter portions of the Empire, or as having any sympathetic understanding of the aspirations of the younger communities which had long enjoyed the privilege of self-government. On the other hand, the founders of the Australian Constitution were familiar with the part which the Supreme Court of the United States, constituted of Judges imbued with the spirit of American nationality, and knowing that the nation must work out its own destiny under the Constitution as framed, or as amended from time to time, had played in the development of the nation, and the harmonious working of its political institutions.

The success of the argument put by Higgins KC on behalf of his clients in Deakin v Webb did not sit well with him, writing in 1905 that "The man in the street is startled and puzzled. He sees a public official, enjoying a regular salary in the postal department, paying the Victorian income-tax until federation, and then suddenly exempted from the tax because the post-office has passed over to federal control." Having been appointed to the High Court along with Isaacs J in 1906, Higgins J set out his dissenting views in Baxter v Commissioners of Taxation (NSW) that:

It is true that I have held, and still hold, a strong opinion with regard to the judgment of Marshall CJ in McCulloch v Maryland – the judgment on which Deakin v Webb was based – although I utter the opinion with a feeling that it will be regarded by some as almost blasphemy. I regard it as being the utterance rather of the statesman than of the lawyer.

In Flint v Webb the Court unanimously declined to issue a certificate to appeal to the Privy Council, with each judge finding that the fact that there was a decision of the Privy Council that was inconsistent with a previous decision of the High Court, where the High Court had refused a certificate of appeal, was inconvenient, but that was not itself a sufficient reason to grant a certificate. Griffith CJ suggested two ways to escape the inconvenient position, (1) make the appellate jurisdiction of the High Court on federal matters exclusive of the State Supreme Court or (2) legislate that the income provided to federal public servants was subject to the rights of the States to tax them. Higgins J described the suggestion that the Commonwealth be deprived of the appellate assistance of the very efficient State Courts as an extreme step. His Honour doubted that the issue could be resolved by federal legislation given that the majority's view in Deakin v Webb rested on constitutional grounds and the federal Parliament had no power to alter the constitution.

=== Legislative response ===
The decisions of the High Court in Baxter v Commissioners of Taxation (NSW) and Flint v Webb were handed down in June 1907. In September the federal Parliament responded to the conflict, adopting both measures identified by Griffith CJ, passing the Commonwealth Salaries Act 1907, which dealt with the substantive dispute by expressly permitting the States to tax the income of Commonwealth officers, and the Judiciary Act 1907, which gave the High Court exclusive jurisdiction "in matters involving any question, howsoever arising, as to the limits inter se of the constitutional powers of the Commonwealth and those of any State or States, or as to the limits inter se of the constitutional power of any two or more of the States". The practical effect of the Judiciary Act amendment was that as no State Court could give a decision on an inter se question, there was no decision to appeal to the Privy Council other than one from the High Court and that required a certificate from the High Court.

=== No return to the Privy Council ===
Despite the failure to obtain certificates under s 74 of the Constitution, the NSW and Victorian commissioners of taxation sought leave to appeal to the Privy Council. The decision of the Privy Council did not address the need for a certificate to appeal and instead declined special leave to appeal primarily on the grounds that the Commonwealth Salaries Act meant the controversy could not arise again.

Despite the policy of the Australian Labor Party from 1908 that appeals to the Privy Council should be abolished, it took no legislative action to implement that policy, and appeals to the Privy Council never became a major political issue. There were calls among lawyers and academics in the 1950s for the abolition of such appeals, however there was no legislative response until 1968, abolishing appeals in matters involving federal legislation, 1975, abolishing almost all appeals from the High Court, and 1986 which abolished appeals from State Courts.

== See also ==
- Australian constitutional law
- List of High Court of Australia cases
