= J. A. Isaacs =

Victorian politician

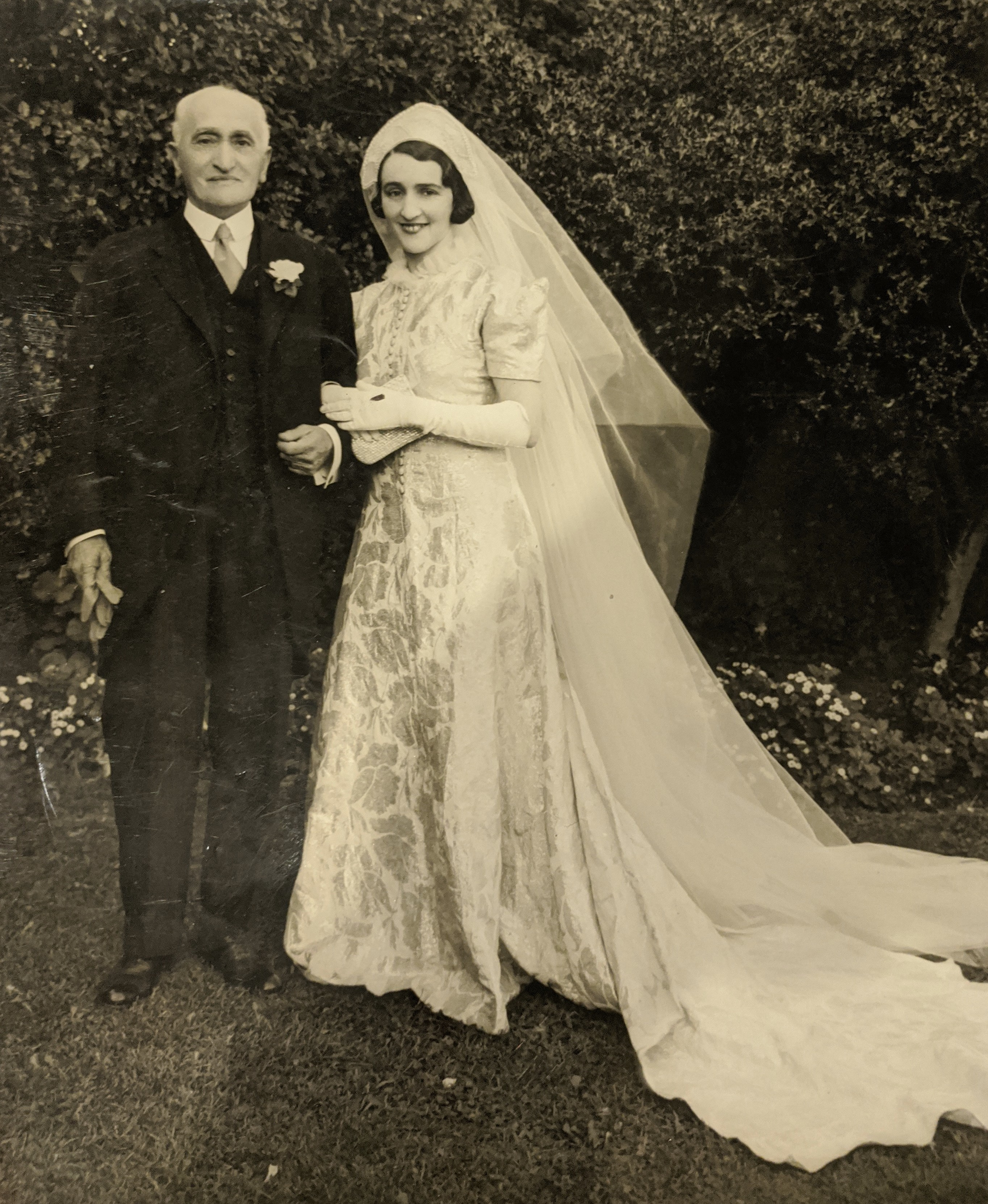
Edna Davis and John Isaacs

John Alfred Isaacs (c. 1861 – 22 August 1944), generally referred to as J. A. Isaacs, was a lawyer and parliamentarian in the Australian colony and state of Victoria. He was a son of Alfred Isaacs (c. 1820 – 1 August 1904) and Rebecca Isaacs, née Abrahams (c. 1822 – 27 August 1912). He was a brother of Sir Isaac Isaacs (1855–1948). He married late in life to a much younger woman.

== History ==
Isaacs was born at Yackandandah and was educated at Beechworth, Victoria.

He practised as a solicitor for many years, before resigning on account of failing health.

He was a member for Ovens in the Victorian Legislative Assembly 1894–1902 and had a home at 550 Burwood Road, Auburn, Victoria.

Isaacs married Edna Frances Davis on 13 April 1938 at "Moawa", the Isaacs' family home at 1 Goodall Street, Hawthorn, Victoria. She was a singer, around fifty years younger than her husband. She had a home at Vale Street, St Kilda.

Isaacs died in August 1944; newspapers obituaries were few and cursory at best. He had in 1939 left a will naming his brother Isaac Isaacs as his sole beneficiary and sole executor. Mrs Edna Isaacs contested the will, claiming that Isaac Isaacs had undue influence on his brother, and had influenced him in ensuring that she received no benefit from his death. John A. Isaacs, who had once been quite wealthy, at his death had assets valued at £33/12/6 and liabilities of £33/14/4, which was explained by counsel for his brother as "gambling losses".
