= D'Emden v Pedder =

1904 Australian court case

- Court: High Court of Australia
- Full case name: D'Emden v Pedder
- Decided: 26 April 1904
- Citations: [1904] HCA 1, (1904) 1 CLR 91.

Case history
- Prior actions: Pedder v D'Emden [1903] TasLawRp 8 [1903] TASLawRp 8; (1903) 2 Tas LR 146 (Supreme Court of Tasmania appeal)

Court membership
- Judges sitting: Griffith CJ, Barton & O'Connor JJ

Case opinions
- (3:0) attempts by the states to exercise legislative or executive power, in a way that would interfere with the legislative or executive power of the federal government, are, unless expressly authorised by the Constitution, invalid (per curiam)

D'Emden v Pedder was a significant Australian court case decided in the High Court of Australia on 26 April 1904. It directly concerned the question of whether salary receipts of federal government employees were subject to state stamp duty, but it touched on the broader issue within Australian constitutional law of the degree to which the two levels of Australian government were subject to each other's laws.

The case was the first of several in which the High Court applied the implied intergovernmental immunities doctrine, relied on in the Supreme Court of the United States case of McCulloch v. Maryland, which held that the state and Commonwealth governments were normally immune from each other's laws, and which, along with the reserved State powers doctrine, would be a significant feature of Australian constitutional law until both doctrines were rejected in the landmark Engineers' case in 1920.

The case is also significant as the first case decided by the High Court involving the interpretation of the Constitution of Australia.

== Background to the case ==
As with the allocation of powers to the United States Congress under the United States Constitution, the Constitution of Australia grants a number of specified powers to the Parliament of Australia, while leaving unassigned powers to the state parliaments. Most of the powers granted to the federal parliament can also be exercised by the state parliaments, though because of section 109 of the Australian Constitution federal laws will prevail in case of inconsistency. This arrangement resulted in a constitutional dispute as to whether the federal government could be subject to state laws, and vice versa.

The factual circumstances giving rise to this case began on 31 March 1903 when Henry D'Emden, who was employed by the federal government as the Deputy Postmaster-General for Tasmania, gave a receipt for his salary to a federal official without paying the Tasmanian stamp duty on it. D'Emden was convicted in a Hobart court, and was ordered to pay a one shilling fine and seven shillings and sixpence in costs and if he failed to pay, imprisoned for seven days' hard labour.

While agreeing that in fact he had not paid the stamp duty, D'Emden argued that at law he was not obliged to pay the state tax, and made the same basic argument in an appeal to the Supreme Court of Tasmania. That appeal was rejected, and D'Emden appealed to the High Court.

== Arguments ==
Arguments were heard on 24 February 1904. D'Emden was represented by the Attorney-General of Australia, Senator James Drake, who put forward four arguments for D'Emden's case:

1. That, in its application to D'Emden, the stamp duty was a tax on the agencies or instrumentalities of the federal government, and was "by necessary implication forbidden by the Constitution";
2. That the stamp duty legislation, to the extent that it purported to affect the salary of federal agents, was inconsistent with the federal legislation setting the salary, and was thus invalid under section 109 of the Constitution;
3. That the stamp duty legislation, to the extent that it purported to apply to salary receipts from the Postmaster-General's Department, was a law with respect to that department, and was thus invalid under section 52 of the Constitution, which granted power over the department exclusively to the federal parliament;
4. That, to the extent that the stamp duty applied to federal salary receipts, it constituted a tax on the property of the Commonwealth, and was thus prohibited by section 114 of the Constitution.

Drake argued that, because of the similarities between the Australian and United States Constitutions in this respect, it was useful to look at decisions of American courts in United States constitutional law when interpreting the Australian Constitution. Drake referenced the 1819 decision of McCulloch v Maryland, in which the Supreme Court of the United States held that the US states may not impede valid constitutional exercises of power by the United States Government, and argued that a similar interpretation should apply to the Australian Constitution. Justice O'Connor noted that the Australian Constitution already contains express provisions in Chapter V dealing with the relationship between the state and federal governments, and asked whether it was not so that as a result "any State law which does not conflict with the express provisions of Commonwealth law must be held good?" To this, Drake responded that the inconsistency provision in section 109, should be regarded as applying not only to federal statutes but to the Constitution itself, including to implied powers under it. Drake then dealt with a number of decisions of American and Canadian courts in which McCulloch v. Maryland, had been distinguished or held not to apply, and argued that they all involved questions distinct from the one in this case.

With respect to the second argument, regarding inconsistency, Chief Justice Griffith questioned whether the federal legislation setting D'Emden's salary was not simply intended to have effect "with reference to the local conditions prevailing in the particular State, such as local taxation, house-rent, prices of food and clothing" and so on, to which Drake replied that the stamp duty legislation was in conflict with the federal legislation because the effect was to diminish D'Emden's salary before he received it, unlike the examples Griffith CJ mentioned of things which would affect it after he received it.

On the third argument, Drake argued that, like American courts had done in similar cases, the High Court should look to the substantive effect of the Tasmanian legislation in considering whether it interfered with an exclusive power of the federal parliament. Justice O'Connor asked Drake whether his argument applied to D'Emden because he was an officer of the Department, or merely because he had performed services for the Department, and Drake responded that his reasoning was not based on the person but on the fact that the salary receipt was a departmental record.

The respondent Pedder was a Superintendent of Police in Tasmania, and he was represented by the Attorney-General of Tasmania, Herbert Nicholls. Nicholls conceded that it was a necessary consequence of a federal system of government that there were limits on the powers of the state and federal governments with respect to each other, and that the states "have no power by taxation or otherwise to retard or burden or in any other manner control the operation of the constitutional laws of the Commonwealth Parliament", but argued that such a doctrine should not be taken without limitation, and that the degree of interference should be considered.

Nicholls emphasised that the stamp duty applied to D'Emden personally, as a private citizen: that while D'Emden "earns his salary as an officer, [he] receives and enjoys it as a private citizen", and that the legislation did not infringe the federal parliament's exclusive powers over the Postmaster-General's Department since "in giving the receipt, [D'Emden] is not serving the Commonwealth, but only dealing with it." Nicholls also conceded that if the stamp duty was levied only on agents of the federal government then it would be unconstitutional, but stressed that it was a general tax applying to all persons in Tasmania.

Nicholls then engaged with Griffith CJ in an exchange about the relationship between the Australian and United States Constitutions. Griffith CJ challenged Nicholls to identify any differences between the two which would make the principles from American cases such as McCulloch v Maryland, inapplicable, Nicholls pointing out section 107, which preserves or "saves" the powers of the state parliaments (except for powers given exclusively to the federal parliament). Griffith CJ suggested that there was no material difference between this provision and the Tenth Amendment, but Nicholls argued that section 107 was far clearer, and further suggested that "the contention that the implied powers of the Commonwealth can over-ride State laws seems hardly consistent with it."

Griffith CJ then said:

"The framers of the Australian Constitution had before them decided cases in which certain provisions of the United States Constitution had received definite and settled interpretation. With these cases before them they used in many of the sections of our Constitution almost identical language. Does not this raise a strong presumption that they intended the same interpretation to be placed upon similar words in our Constitution?"

Nicholls agreed, but maintained that as far as the provisions for the relationship between the states and the federal government were concerned, the Australian Constitution was quite different from the United States Constitution.

== Judgment ==
A unanimous opinion was handed down by the court, delivered by Chief Justice Griffith.

After laying out the facts the court promptly rejected D'Emden's fourth argument, that the salary receipt was property within the meaning of section 114 of the Constitution, saying that the section was intended to prohibit state taxes on property per se (the stamp duty was effectively a personal tax). It then proceeded to consider the bulk of the case.

The court found that the legislation governing salary receipts for employees of federal departments (then contained within the Audit Act 1901) was clearly to do with "the conduct of the departmental affairs of the Commonwealth Government", an area which, under section 52 of the Constitution, was within the exclusive authority of the federal government and was, thus, immune from state authority. The court expressed the principle in this way:

"In considering the respective powers of the Commonwealth and of the States it is essential to bear in mind that each is, within the ambit of its authority, a sovereign State, subject only to the restrictions imposed by the Imperial connection and to the provisions of the Constitution, either expressed or necessarily implied... a right of sovereignty subject to extrinsic control is a contradiction in terms. It must, therefore, be taken to be of the essence of the Constitution that the Commonwealth is entitled, within the ambit of its authority, to exercise its legislative and executive powers in absolute freedom, and without any interference or control whatever except that prescribed by the Constitution itself... It follows that when a State attempts to give to its legislative or executive authority an operation which, if valid, would fetter, control, or interfere with, the free exercise of the legislative or executive power of the Commonwealth, the attempt, unless expressly authorized by the Constitution, is to that extent invalid and inoperative."

On the use of United States case law, from which the doctrine had largely been drawn, the court acknowledged that decisions of the Supreme Court of the United States were of course not binding in Australia but, given the similarities between the American and Australian Constitutions, such decisions "may well be regarded... not as an infallible guide, but as a most welcome aid and assistance." The court went on to discuss the method by which the Constitution was formed, at the Constitutional Conventions, and said that "we think... we are entitled to assume – what, after all, is a fact of public notoriety – that some, if not all, of the framers of the Constitution were familiar, not only with the Constitution of the United States, but with that of the Canadian Dominion and those of the British colonies", and that when provisions of the Australian Constitution are in substance the same as those in other constitutions, and those other provisions have been interpreted by courts in a certain way, "it is not an unreasonable inference that [the Australian Constitution's] framers intended that like provisions should receive like interpretation." Griffith CJ, Barton and O'Connor JJ were capable of speaking for at least some of the framers of the Constitution, having each "assisted in the actual drafting of the constitutional documents."

The court then quoted extensively and with approval from the judgment of Chief Justice John Marshall in McCulloch v Maryland, specifically from a passage discussing the ideological basis of taxation, the relationship between the various American states and the Union, and the implications of the Supremacy Clause. The court went on to note that the principles enunciated in that case had been met with approval subsequently in United States cases, and also in cases in the Canadian provinces of Ontario and New Brunswick, and thus rebuffed an argument raised by the majority of the Supreme Court of Tasmania that the doctrine did not have support.

The court rejected another argument raised by the majority of the Supreme Court: that it is necessary in every case to consider whether the attempted exercise of power by a state actually inhibited or interfered with the workings of the federal government, instead deciding that any claimed power which has the potential for such interference will be invalid, and consideration of whether there was actual interference would be irrelevant.

In a final point, the court said that, applying the basic principle of statutory construction that a piece of legislation "should, if possible, receive such an interpretation as will make [it] operative and not inoperative", the Tasmanian legislation imposing the stamp duty should be interpreted so as not to apply to federal officers in circumstances such as that of D'Emden, but it would otherwise be valid.

== Consequences ==
The High Court proceeded to apply the implied immunity of instrumentalities doctrine in a range of cases, many of which also involved taxation and were similarly controversial. In the case of Deakin v Webb, decided later in 1904, the Court held that Alfred Deakin was not liable to pay Victorian income tax on his salary as a member of the Australian House of Representatives, and as Attorney-General of Australia and later Prime Minister of Australia, based on the principles in D'Emden v Pedder. The Judicial Committee of the Privy Council over-ruled the decisions in D'Emden v Pedder and Deakin v Webb in the 1906 case of Webb v Outtrim, but in Baxter v Commissioners of Taxation (NSW), the High Court held that the Privy Council had decided the case without jurisdiction, and upheld the doctrine. The Commonwealth Salaries Act 1907, settled the issue of state taxation by making all federal salaries subject to state taxes. The Privy Council declined special leave to appeal from the decision in Baxter v Commissioners of Taxation (NSW) as the result of Commonwealth law was that the controversy could not arise again.

In the Railway Servants' case, the High Court held that the doctrine worked both ways, that is, it held that the states were also immune from Commonwealth laws, in finding that a trade union representing employees of the Government of New South Wales could not be registered under federal industrial relations legislation.

H. B. Higgins, an opponent of the implied immunities doctrine who would be appointed to the High Court himself in 1906, wrote in response to the decisions in this and several other cases that "The man in the street is startled and puzzled. He sees a public official, enjoying a regular salary in the postal department, paying the Victorian income-tax until federation, and then suddenly exempted from the tax because the post-office has passed over to federal control."

The doctrine was challenged by the appointment of Higgins and Isaac Isaacs to the High Court in 1906, and they regularly dissented from Griffith CJ, Barton and O'Connor JJ in implied immunities cases. The doctrine, along with the doctrine of reserved State powers, would ultimately be overturned in the Engineers' case of 1920.

Writing in 1939, H. V. Evatt (at the time a Justice of the High Court) discussed D'Emden v Pedder and the other implied immunity of instrumentalities cases and suggested that the High Court in the Engineers' case may have taken too drastic an approach to D'Emden. The court in the Engineers' case did not overturn the result of D'Emden since they would have arrived at the same result based on an application of section 109 of the Australian Constitution, which deals with inconsistency between state and federal legislation by specifying that the federal legislation will prevail. Evatt argued that the court had introduced a notion of supremacy which led to them misinterpreting the decision in D'Emden, saying that Griffith CJ "regarded the rule... as one of mutual non-interference, and certainly not as perpetrating the absurdity of 'mutual supremacy'", that being the epithet with which the court in the Engineers' case had rejected any place for a doctrine of mutual immunity of instrumentalities. However, Evatt did concede that the Engineers' case showed that if any principle of immunity were to be revived, it "must have a far narrower operation in Australia than was first supposed by Griffith CJ"; indeed, it has been said that the principle as laid down in D'Emden was of even broader application than that set out by Chief Justice Marshall in McCulloch v Maryland.
