= Re Australian Education Union =

Judgement of the High Court of Australia

- Court: High Court of Australia
- Full case name: Re Australian Education Union & Australian Nursing Federation; Ex parte Victoria
- Decided: 7 April 1995
- Citations: [1995] HCA 71, (1995) 184 CLR 188

Court membership
- Judges sitting: Mason CJ, Brennan, Deane, Dawson, Toohey, Gaudron & McHugh JJ

Re Australian Education Union & Australian Nursing Federation; ex parte Victoria is a High Court of Australia constitutional law case that involves the scope of the intergovernmental immunity doctrine in Australian constitutional law.

In the case, the High Court struck down a Commonwealth law on the grounds that it impaired the capacity of a state to function as an independent government, the first time that the Court has taken such action.

== Background ==
Under a Commonwealth law, the Australian Industrial Relations Commission could refrain from hearing a dispute if it thought it could be handled in a state body. However, Victoria argued that the law was discriminatory because Victoria had abolished its state-based system, the only state to have done so.

Furthermore, there was the question of whether Commonwealth orders that applied to state employees would prevent the state from exercising their essential functions.

== Judgment ==
In a joint judgment, the Court accepted the tests of discrimination and structural integrity as laid down in Melbourne Corporation v Commonwealth. In this case, no discrimination was found, but the court found that the law affected the structural integrity of the state.

As for discrimination, there were two issues to consider. Firstly, even though the purpose of the law was to discriminate against Victoria, that is not a factor to consider. Secondly, in its practical effect, it could apply to any state, as well as to any industrial employees.

As for the structural integrity argument, it is required that the law directs attention to aspects of a state's functions that are "critical to its capacity to function". Being able to determine minimum wages and working conditions of its employees, especially those in the higher levels of government, is critical to a state's capacity to function.

== See also ==
- Australian Education Union
- Australian constitutional law

== Readings ==
- Winterton, G. et al. Australian federal constitutional law: commentary and materials, 1999. LBC Information Services, Sydney.
