= Intergovernmental immunity (Australia) =

Principle of Australian federalism

In Australia, the doctrine of intergovernmental immunity defines the circumstances in which Commonwealth laws can bind the States, and where State laws can bind the Commonwealth. This is distinct from the doctrine of crown immunity, as well as the rule expressed in Section 109 of the Australian Constitution which governs conflicts between Commonwealth and State laws.

== Early doctrine ==
=== The inaugural High Court ===
Prior to 1920, the High Court of Australia tended to employ the US jurisprudence governing intergovernmental immunity, expressing it as an implied immunity of instrumentalities, where neither the Commonwealth nor State governments could be affected by the laws of the other. This was first expressed in D'Emden v Pedder, Deakin v Webb, and the Railway Servants' case. As Griffith CJ declared in the first case:

In considering the respective powers of the Commonwealth and of the States it is essential to bear in mind that each is, within the ambit of its authority, a sovereign State, subject only to the restrictions imposed by the Imperial connection and to the provisions of the Constitution, either expressed or necessarily implied... a right of sovereignty subject to extrinsic control is a contradiction in terms. It must, therefore, be taken to be of the essence of the Constitution that the Commonwealth is entitled, within the ambit of its authority, to exercise its legislative and executive powers in absolute freedom, and without any interference or control whatever except that prescribed by the Constitution itself... It follows that when a State attempts to give to its legislative or executive authority an operation which, if valid, would fetter, control, or interfere with, the free exercise of the legislative or executive power of the Commonwealth, the attempt, unless expressly authorized by the Constitution, is to that extent invalid and inoperative.

However, the doctrine did have limits. Deakin v Webb was overturned by the Judicial Committee of the Privy Council in 1906, although the High Court largely ignored the ruling and stuck to its precedent in D'Emden. In the Steel Rails case, it was held that States were still liable to pay customs duties.

=== The Engineers' case ===
The inconsistency within the jurisprudence was not addressed until 1920, where the High Court overturned the Railway Servants' case, and affirmed the Steel Rails case, as a result of its ruling in the Engineers' case, holding that the laws of the Commonwealth and the States have full operation within the subjects upon which they have power to legislate, subject to S. 109 in the event of inconsistency. Commonwealth laws could therefore bind the States and State laws could bind the Commonwealth. However the majority judgment, commonly attributed to Isaacs J, noted that different considerations may apply in the case of discriminatory laws, as well as in some other matters:

If in any future case concerning the prerogative in the broader sense, or arising under some other Commonwealth power—for instance, taxation,—the extent of that power should come under consideration so as to involve the effect of the principle stated in the passage just quoted from the Bonanza Creek Case, and its application to the prerogative or to the legislative or executive power of the States in relation to the specific Commonwealth power concerned, the special nature of the power may have to be taken into account. That this must be so is patent from the circumstance that the legislative powers given to the Commonwealth Parliament are all prefaced with one general express limitation, namely, "subject to this Constitution," and consequently those words, which have to be applied seriatim to each placitum, require the Court to consider with respect to each separate placitum, over and beyond the general fundamental considerations applying to all the placita, whether there is anything in the Constitution which falls within the express limitation referred to in the governing words of sec. 51. That inquiry, however, must proceed consistently with the principles upon which we determine this case, for they apply generally to all powers contained in that section.

The rule was more succinctly expressed in 1930 by Dixon J in Australian Railways Union v Victorian Railways Commissioners, where he stated:

... every grant of legislative power to the Commonwealth should be interpreted as authorizing the Parliament to make laws affecting the operations of the States and their agencies, at any rate if the State is not acting in the exercise of the Crown's prerogative and if the Parliament confines itself to laws which do not discriminate against the States or their agencies.

=== The Melbourne Corporation case ===
In 1947, Melbourne Corporation v Commonwealth explored the nature of what constituted a discriminatory law. In that case, as refined in subsequent jurisprudence, the implied limitation on legislative power arose upon the application of a two-part test, which was clarified in subsequent jurisprudence and summarised by Mason J in Queensland Electricity Commission v Commonwealth:

23. This review of the authorities shows that the principle is now well established and that it consists of two elements:

1. the prohibition against discrimination which involves the placing on the States of special burdens or disabilities; and
2. the prohibition against laws of general application which operate to destroy or curtail the continued existence of the States or their capacity to function as governments...

The second element of the prohibition is necessarily less precise than the first; it protects the States against laws which, complying with the first element because they have a general application, may nevertheless produce the effect which it is the object of the principle to prevent.

== Modern jurisprudence ==
=== Discriminatory laws – Cigamatic, Residential Tenancies and Austin ===
Although Dixon J had suggested in the Melbourne Corporation case that the States lack the power to legislate with respect to the rights and activities of the Commonwealth, it was not until 1962 when, as Chief Justice, he declared in Commonwealth v Cigamatic Pty Ltd (In Liq):

It is not a question, as it appears to me, of interpreting some positive power of the State over a given subject matter. It is not a question of making some implication in favour of the Commonwealth restraining some acknowledged legislative power of the State. If you express the priority belonging to the Commonwealth as a prerogative of the Crown in right of the Commonwealth, the question is whether the legislative powers of the States could extend over one of the prerogatives of the Crown in right of the Commonwealth. If, as in modern times I think it is more correct to do, you describe it as a fiscal right belonging to the Commonwealth as a government and affecting its Treasury, it is a question of State legislative power affecting to control or abolish a federal fiscal right. It is not a question of the authority of the power of a State to make some general law governing the rights and duties of those who enter into some description of transaction, such as the sale of goods, and of the Commonwealth in its executive arm choosing to enter into a transaction of that description. It is not a question of the exercise of some specific grant of power which according to the very meaning of the terms in which it is defined embraces the subject matter itself : for it is not the plan of the Constitution to grant specific powers to the States over defined subjects. It is, I think, a question which cannot be regarded as simply governed by the applicability of the principles upon which Melbourne Corporation v. The Commonwealth ... depended.

This was endorsed in 1997 in the Residential Tenancies case, where it was stated:

No implication limiting an otherwise given power is needed; the character of the Commonwealth as a body politic, armed with executive capacities by the Constitution, by its very nature places those capacities outside the legislative power of another body politic, namely a State, without specific powers in that respect.... [T]he fundamental point made in Cigamatic is that in the absence of a like power being conferred upon the States, the priority of the Crown in right of the Commonwealth in the payment of debts is not something over which the States have legislative power.

By implication, both Cigamatic, and Residential Tenancies, hold that:

- State laws of general application which regulate such activities as the sale of goods or entering into contracts are validly binding on the executive government of the Commonwealth, but
- where such a law alters or impairs the capacities or functions of the executive, it will be invalid as being beyond the legislative power of the State.

In 2003, the first prong of the Melbourne Corporation test (relating to considerations about discrimination) was given diminished importance in Austin v Commonwealth, where it was stated, "To fix separately upon laws addressed to one or more of the States and upon laws of so-called 'general application', and to present the inquiry as differing in nature dependent upon the form taken by laws enacted under the one head of power, tends to favour form over substance." There is debate as to whether such a move was either necessary or desirable.

=== Taxation ===
The exception relating to taxation that was noted in Engineers, was rejected by the High Court in 1971 with the Payroll Tax case, which upheld the Commonwealth's ability to impose a payroll tax on all employers. Barwick CJ noted: "...in my opinion, the statement that the imposition of this tax threatens or impairs the independence of the State is, as a statement of a legal conclusion, unwarranted".

=== Australian Education Union ===
In 1995, in the AEU case, the High Court struck down a Commonwealth law on the grounds that it impaired the capacity of a State to function as an independent government. This was the first time in the Court's history that such action had taken place.

== See also ==
- Intergovernmental immunity - US doctrine
- Interjurisdictional immunity - Canadian doctrine

== Other significant cases ==
- Sydney Municipal Council v Commonwealth [1904] HCA 50, (1904) 1 CLR 208.
- Pirrie v McFarlane [1925] HCA 30, (1925) 36 CLR 170.
- Re Richard Foreman & Sons Pty Ltd; Uther v Federal Commissioner of Taxation [1947] HCA 45, (1947) 74 CLR 508.
- Australian Capital Television Pty Ltd v Commonwealth [1992] HCA 1, (1992) 177 CLR 106.
