= Henderson v Defence Housing Authority =

1997 High Court of Australia case

- Court: High Court of Australia
- Full case name: Re Residential Tenancies Tribunal of NSW v Henderson; Ex parte Defence Housing Authority
- Decided: 12 August 1997
- Citations: [1997] HCA 36, (1997) 190 CLR 410; (1997) 146 ALR 495; (1997) 71 ALJR 1254

Court membership
- Judges sitting: Brennan CJ, Dawson, Toohey, Gaudron, McHugh, Gummow and Kirby JJ

Case opinions
- Decision by: Dawson, Toohey and Gaudron JJ
- Concurrence: Brennan CJ
- Concur/dissent: McHugh J; Gummow J
- Dissent: Kirby J

Henderson v Defence Housing Authority, also known as the Residential Tenancies case, is a landmark Australian High Court decision on intergovernmental immunity and states' rights under the Australian Constitution.

== Facts of the case ==
Dr Henderson was the owner of a house which was leased by the Defence Housing Authority which used the property to provide accommodation for defence personnel. Dr Henderson the owner sought orders from the NSW Residential Tenancies Tribunal requiring the DHA to allow him to enter the premises for the purpose of inspection and give the owner a key to the premises.

In response the DHA maintained that it was not bound by the Residential Tenancies Act 1987 as it was immune from state laws about tenant disputes due to the Commonwealth government enjoying Crown immunity from State laws.

The matter was heard before the High Court of Australia.

== Decision reached ==
It was established that the DHA was created under s. 61 of the Constitution (concerning the royal prerogative), so there was no actual law in which the state law could be in conflict.

By a 6:1 majority (Brennan CJ, Dawson, Toohey, Gaudron, McHugh and Gummow JJ; Kirby J dissenting) the Court held that the DHA is subject to the NSW Act.

Four judges saw a distinction between the capacity of the crown which state law can’t affect and the exercise of the crown authority which state law could affect. One judge (McHugh) thought it was unrealistic to make that distinction, but held a state law could affect the manner in which the performance of commonwealth duty.

By a 6:1 majority (McHugh J dissenting) the Court rejected the broad proposition that the Commonwealth cannot be bound by State legislation.

However, by a 6:1 majority (Kirby J dissenting) also rejected the argument that the Commonwealth's constitutional immunity from State law is no greater than the immunity which the States enjoy from Commonwealth law.

== Impact ==
Henderson is relevant in assessing how a State's legislative and executive actions may affect the Commonwealth's executive power, although a State's executive actions in that regard appear to be restricted to the area of royal prerogative.

While there were majorities in favour of general concepts in the matter, there were differing views on specific aspects concerning the distribution of legislative power:

- Dawson, Toohey and Gaudron JJ held that, where the Commonwealth has a pre-existing relationship with a citizen and a State passes a law which potentially affects that relationship, the State law will be valid so long as it is of general application and does impose a disability on, or remove a privilege or immunity of, the Commonwealth. In Brennan CJ's view, which was similar to McHugh J's, such laws would not be valid as the Commonwealth had not chosen whether to be subject to it. As all five agreed that the Commonwealth will only be bound by State law where it has consented to be bound, this has the effect of making the Commonwealth executive superior to those of the States.
- Whether a State law affects the executive capacities of the Commonwealth, as opposed to the exercise of them, will be a matter subject to the facts of a particular case.
- The High Court's view of the relevance of s. 109 in such matters was inconclusive. McHugh, Gummow and Kirby JJ believed that, where executive power arises from statute, the Commonwealth's protection from State law must come from s. 109 and not from the Cigamatic doctrine. Dawson, Toohey and Gaudron JJ did not consider s. 109 in formulating their judgment. Certain commentators consider the first viewpoint to be more consistent with the nature of Australian federation.
- While Dawson, Toohey and Gaudron JJ held that the States do not have specific legislative powers to restrict or modify the executive capacities of the Commonwealth, but the Commonwealth does have such authority with respect to those of the States, it has been noted that there is no reason why a State law could not affect the Commonwealth so long as it is for the peace, order and good government of that State.
- Dawson, Toohey, Gaudron and McHugh JJ agreed that the States do not have the power to alter the legal relationships between the Commonwealth and its subjects.

The majority of Justices accepted that s. 64 of the Judiciary Act 1903 did not apply, as the DHA was not a body that was subject to the Cigamatic doctrine. However, Commonwealth v Evans Deakin Industries had previously held that that provision will mean that a wide range of State laws may apply to the Commonwealth in circumstances where the doctrine applies.

== See also ==
- Pirrie v McFarlane.
