= Austin v Commonwealth =

Judgement of the High Court of Australia

- Court: High Court of Australia
- Full case name: Austin v The Commonwealth of Australia
- Decided: 5 February 2003
- Citations: [2003] HCA 3, (2003) 215 CLR 185

Court membership
- Judges sitting: Gleeson CJ, Gaudron, McHugh, Gummow, Kirby and Hayne JJ

Case opinions
- (5:1) Confirmed one-limbed Melbourne Corporation principle that there are limits to the Commonwealth's ability to control the states. Commonwealth provisions cannot burden a state's structural integrity - its ability to exist or carry out its essential functions (per Gleeson CJ, Gaudron, Gummow, Kirby and Hayne JJ) (4:2) The Commonwealth imposition of a superannuation tax surcharge on judges was invalid. (per Gleeson CJ, Gaudron, Gummow and Hayne JJ)

Austin v Commonwealth, is a High Court of Australia case that deals with issues of intergovernmental immunity and discrimination of states against Commonwealth power.

== Background ==
Austin was a judge of the Supreme Court of New South Wales, who was challenging a Commonwealth law that imposed a superannuation contributions surcharge on judges. The Commonwealth law was part of a wider scheme imposing a superannuation charge on higher-income earners, equalising the tax burden on judges vis-a-vis other high-income earners. The surcharge was not imposed on states directly as employers because it could have infringed Section 114 of the Constitution, which outlaws taxation of state property. If a person was a judge since before 1987, the charge was not imposed as the liability to pay the charge could have run to hundreds of thousands of dollars.

The New South Wales government, in response, amended the charge system to lower the burden that would have to be paid.

== Decision ==
Gaudron, Gummow and Hayne JJ rejected the separate discrimination limb found in the Melbourne Corporation principle. In their view, if Melbourne Corporation is read carefully, it is more concerned with a state's ability to function i.e. the structural integrity limb of the principle was paramount. For a law to infringe the Melbourne Corporation principles it must ultimately infringe the state's structural integrity. While they reject the two-limbed principle, they do not offer an alternative, instead of conflating the principles into a single principle of structural integrity. In applying the facts, the majority stressed the importance of judicial remuneration in attracting suitable judges and securing their independence. They found this tax effectively forced the states to adjust their remuneration in order to safeguard judicial standards i.e. increase judges pay. For this reason, they found the law impaired the states' ability to exercise their essential functions.

In a separate judgment for the majority, Gleeson CJ found the discrimination element of the Melbourne Corporation was part of a broader principle of structural integrity. Hence the two-limbed test in Melbourne Corporation is reduced to a one-limbed test. The Commonwealth's imposition of the charge forced states to alter their remuneration arrangements, which impaired their constitutional status and integrity.

McHugh J was the only judge to endorse the two-limbed Melbourne Corporation principle. He thought the two-limbed test was well-settled and there was no need to alter it. On the application of the first limb (discrimination), he found the Commonwealth law in singling out (and thus discriminating against) state judges placed a burden upon the states and was thus invalid. His reasoning thus implicitly links the two limbs of the test.

Kirby J agreed with the majority's assessment that the Melbourne Corporation principle is actually reducible to a one-limbed test. However, on the application of this one-limbed test, he found that the burden on states of having judges with higher tax liabilities (i.e. a high state remuneration burden) was not heavy enough to impair state functioning. The effect, he argued, was marginal at best. Kirby J noted that the other judges exaggerated the burden on states, and were sensitive to issues of judicial pay. He also pointed out that judge's salaries are subject to a wide variety of taxes and charges, asking how this single charge could affect a state's capacity to carry out its essential functions. Thus, while he dissented on the outcome, Kirby J agreed with the majority on the law.

Overall, the court confirmed its interpretation of the Melbourne Corporation principle, that it is a one-limbed principle concerning the structural integrity of the states and their ability to exercise their functions.

== See also ==
- Australian constitutional law
