= Edna Davis =

Australian entertainer and performer (1907–1989)

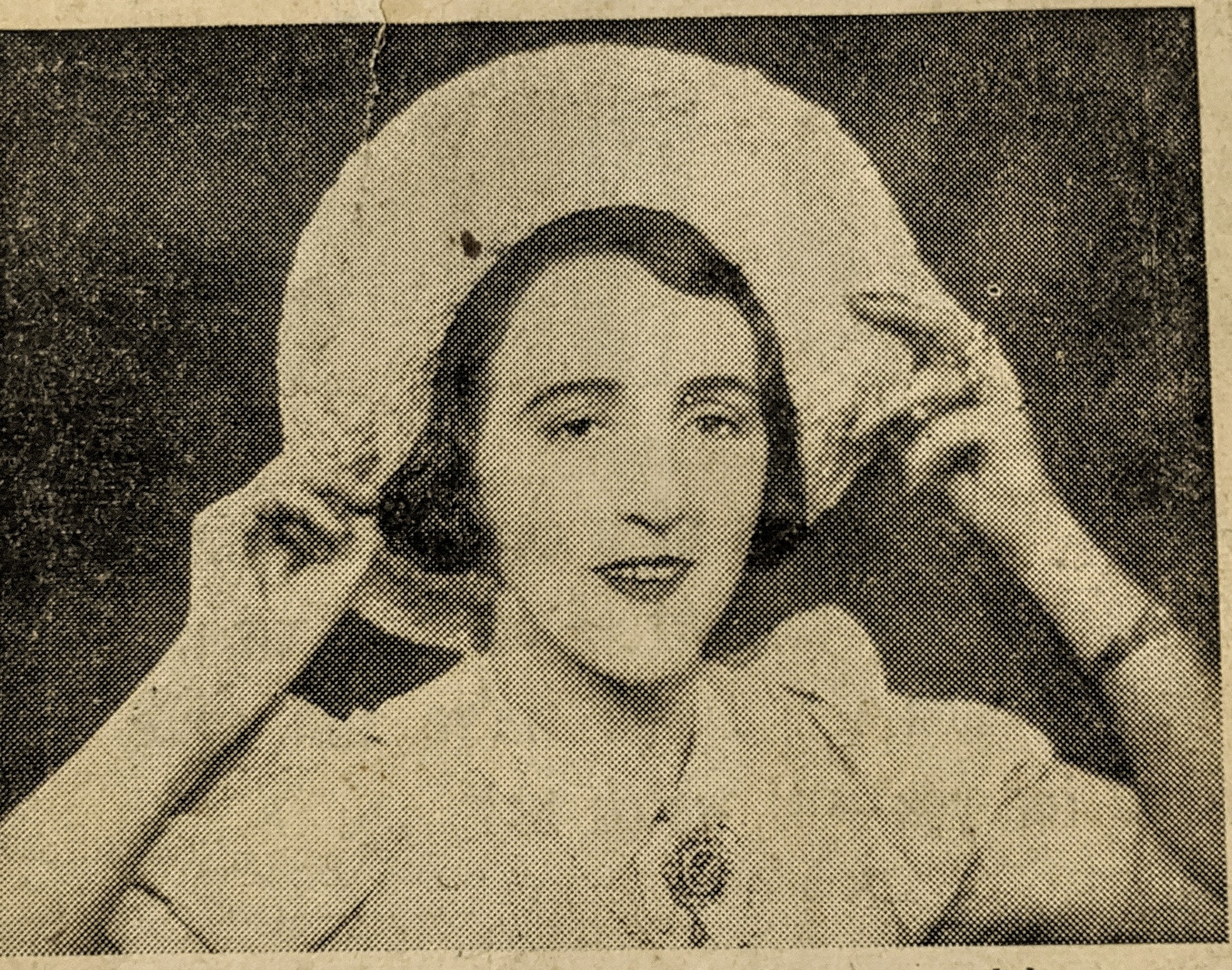
- Davis in 1937
- Born: Frances Edna Davis; 1907; Melbourne, Australia
- Died: 1989 (aged 81–82)
- Other names: Elsa 'Phar Lap' Davis
- Occupation(s): Composer and performer

Frances Edna "Elsa" Davis (1907–1989) was an Australian entertainer and performer, and notorious vexatious litigant.

== Early life ==
Davis was born in 1907 in Melbourne, where she resided for all her life. She began performing in 1916 as a nine year old, playing the piano and xylophone at various venues around Melbourne. In 1921 her five year old sister Olga joined her for "Baby Olga and Edna Davis" which featured at The Tivoli, and other venues in Melbourne, Sydney, and Brisbane. In 1929 their mother took them to London and Cairo to perform the show, perhaps as a result of their parents separation and subsequent divorce.

== Career ==
Davis was trained in pianoforte and opera singing, and a self-taught xylophone player. She was a natural performer, and earned much success as a teenager doing elaborate stage presentations before film showings in silent movie theatres. Her remarkable skill earned her billings at theatres all over Melbourne, including the Victory in St Kilda, the Renown in Elsternwick, and the Regent in Thornbury. Known as "Little Edna Davis: the Celebrated Child Xylophonist", her popularity led to her touring interstate in 1922, at just fifteen years old.

As she got older and her popularity as a child performer waned, Davis enjoyed further success as a composer. She wrote a number of marches for public performances, including the "Centenary March" in 1934 for the Duke of Gloucester's visit to Australia, played while he sailed up Port Phillip Bay. In later life she composed a march for the West Gate Bridge opening in 1978 entitled "Mighty West Gate Bridge March". Dressed in sequins and heavy makeup and accompanied by the RAAF band, she sang and danced her way through the opening and was described as being "totally nuts".

=== Legal affairs ===
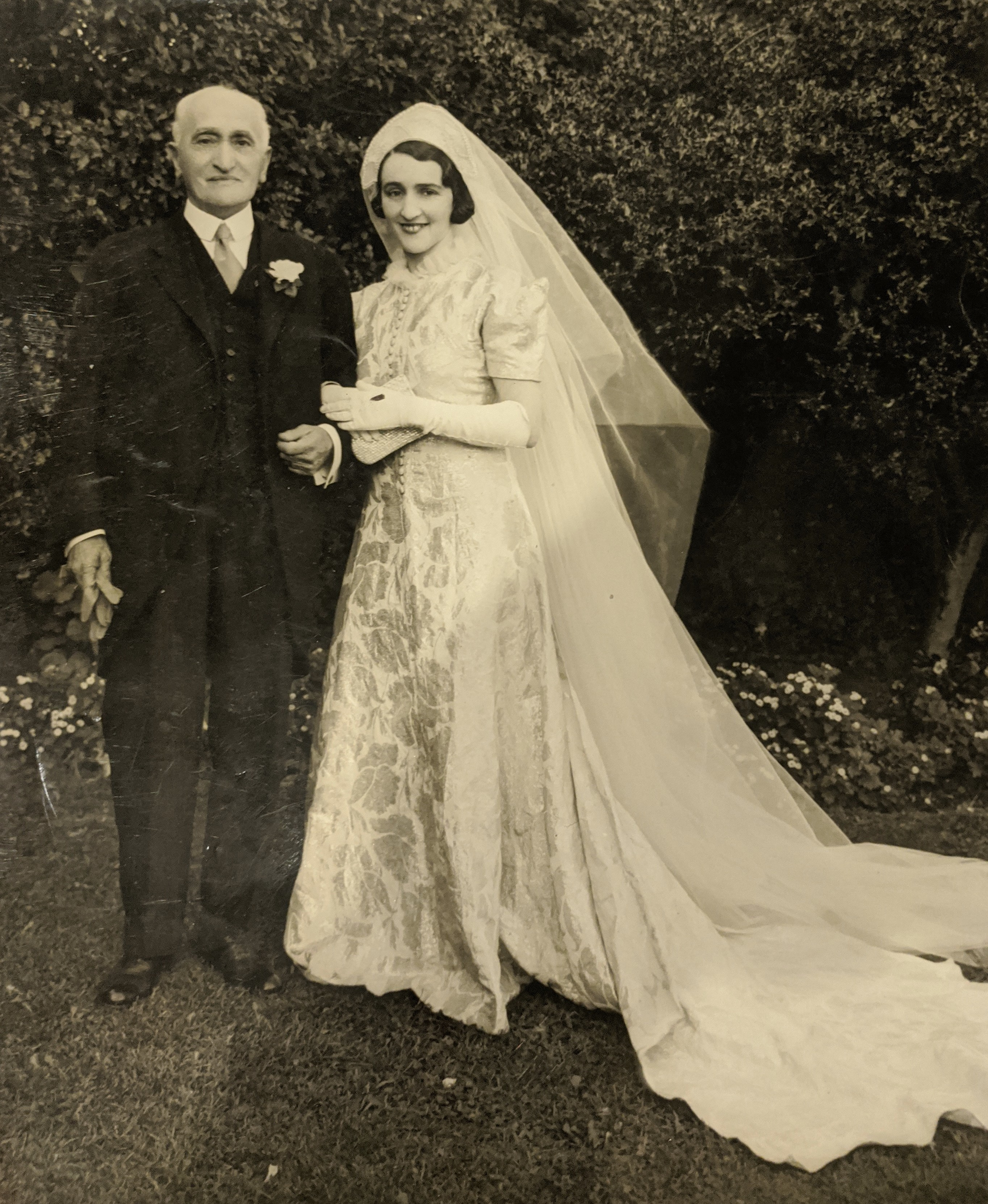
Edna Davis and John Isaacs on their wedding day

In 1938 Davis married her first husband John Isaacs, brother of Sir Isaac Isaacs, the former Governor-General and Chief Justice of Australia. John was a solicitor and forty-four years her senior; undoubtedly captivated by her vivacity. However their marriage was a tumultuous one, with Davis' hectic social calendar and frequent outbursts interfering with the quieter life appreciated by the older Isaacs. Their final dispute was over John secretly changing the sole ownership of his house to a joint tenancy with his brother, which meant she wouldn't inherit the house upon his death. She left the house the next day.

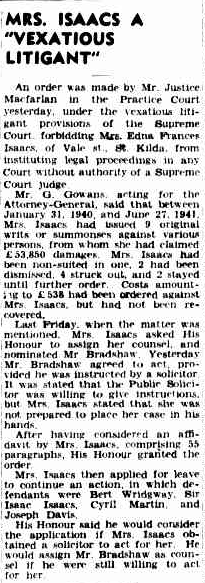
"Mrs Isaacs A Vexatious Litigant", [22 July, 1941, p. 3] The Argus

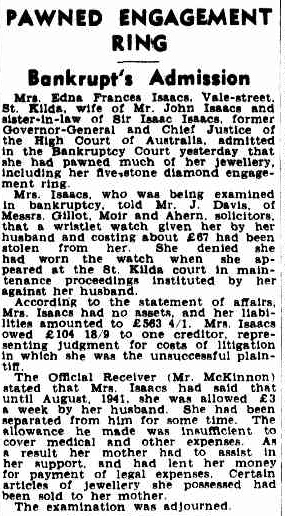
"Pawned Engagement Ring. Bankrupt's Admission", [17 September, 1942, p. 4] The Age

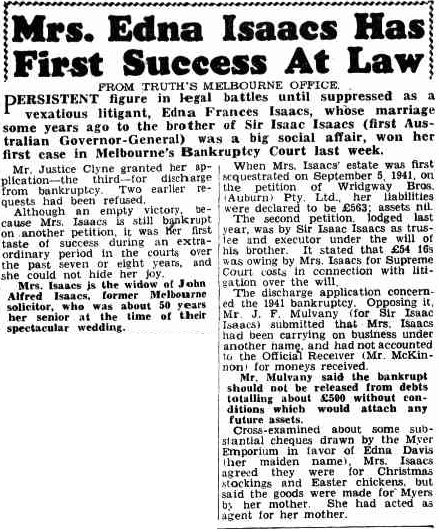
"Mrs. Edna Isaacs Has First Success At Law", [27 April, 1947, p. 47] Truth

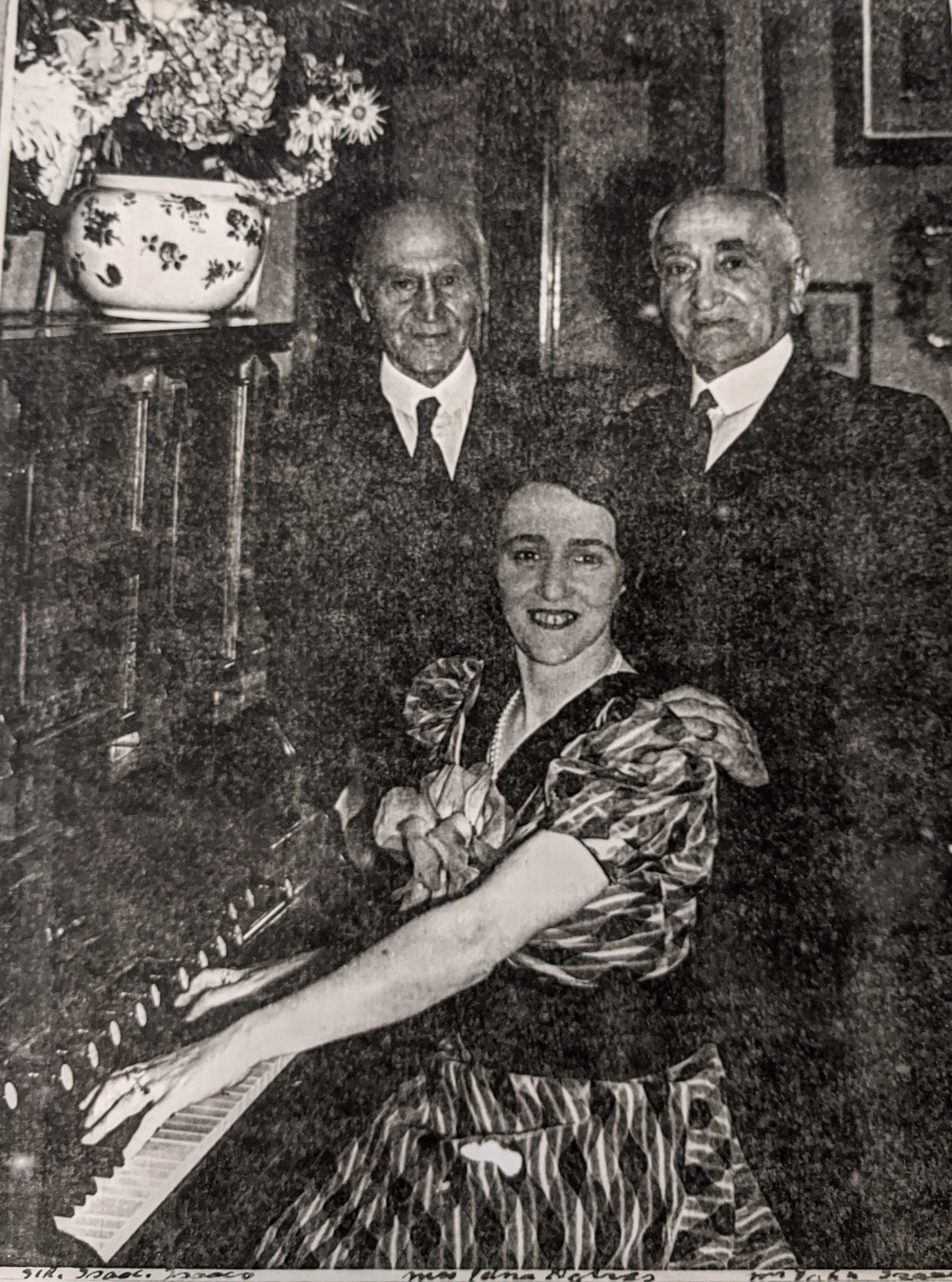
Sir Isaac Isaacs, Edna Davis, and John Isaacs at the piano

The breakdown of his brother's marriage with Davis led Sir Isaac to use his connections to legally pursue and diminish her up until his death. Davis tried to return to their home but was advised by her husband's solicitors that upon her doing so her maintenance payments from him would be reduced. Due to a lack of funds, she pawned the wedding ring John had given her, which had belonged to his mother Rebecca. This spurred on Sir Isaac to cut all amenities to the home and have the furniture removed. She responded by taking legal action over the loss of the ring, and suing the removalists who took the furniture. Davis' inability to let matters lie and Isaacs' determination to fight for his brother led to a battle of litigation which favoured Sir Isaac and his vast influence and left Davis penniless. After having many days in court he used his influence to have her declared a "vexatious litigant" preventing her from pursuing any further legal action without leave of the Court.

=== Russian interest ===
Davis married her second husband Geza "Fred" Laszloffy, twenty three years her junior, in February 1954 at the Catholic Sacred Heart Church in St. Kilda. Her new husband's income from factory work allowed Davis to further her career of musical composition and receive significant publicity. Davis enjoyed linking her music to events in contemporary life, composing with Laszloffy Under the Sputnik With You in tribute to the Russians' successful launch of two satellites into space in 1957. The song was a smash hit in Russia, leading to several other musical pieces for the Russian market and winning them a Lenin medal. This Russian interest also earned the couple special attention from ASIO, with security files monitoring them for a decade.
