= Jacob Danglow =

Jacob Danglow (1880–1962) was a British-Australian rabbi, army chaplain, and army officer.

== Overview ==
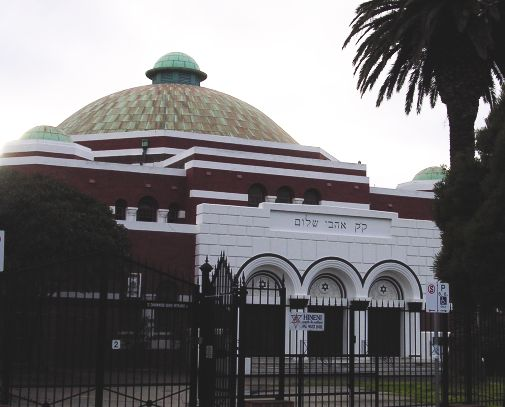
St Kilda Hebrew Congregation

Danglow born on November 28, 1880, in London Borough of Wandsworth to a glazier. In 1893 he received training to serve as a minister in an English-speaking synagogue. He earned a B.A. in 1908 and an M.A. in 1911. In 1908, he appointed Jewish military chaplain the following year. In 1934, the Chief Rabbi in London approved changing Danglow's title from "minister" to "rabbi." He oversaw the publication of a prayer book for Jewish servicemen. Danglow resisted most attempts to bring radical change to his community, striving instead to maintain a moderate path of Jewish Orthodoxy. His personal loyalty to King and country increasingly led to a conflict with supporters of Jewish national independence and support for the State of Israel. Danglow was made C.M.G. in 1956. Danglow died on May 21, 1962, in St Kilda.
