= Federated Amalgamated Government Railway & Tramway Service Association v NSW Rail Traffic Employees Association =

Judgement of the High Court of Australia

- Court: High Court of Australia
- Decided: 17 December 1906
- Citations: [1906] HCA 94, (1906) 4 CLR 488

Court membership
- Judges sitting: Griffith CJ, Barton & O'Connor JJ

Case opinions
- (3:0) State railways employees could not be part of an interstate industrial dispute under the doctrine of "implied inter-governmental immunities".

Laws applied
- Overruled by
- Amalgamated Society of Engineers v Adelaide Steamship Co Ltd [1920] HCA 54, (1920) 28 CLR 129

Federated Amalgamated Government Railway & Tramway Service Association v NSW Rail Traffic Employees Association, known as the Railway Servants Case, is an early High Court of Australia case that held that employees of State railways could not be part of an interstate industrial dispute under the conciliation and arbitration power, applying the doctrine of "implied inter-governmental immunities". The doctrine was emphatically rejected by the High Court in the 1920 Engineers' Case, and in 1930 the High Court upheld the validity of an award binding on state railway authorities.

== Background ==
Whether State railways employees should be covered by the Commonwealth Conciliation and Arbitration Bill was a politically contentious issue. When the Australian Labor Party sought to amend the Conciliation and Arbitration Bill to cover State railway employees, a number of radicals in Deakin's government supported the amendments and helped bring down the government, with Labor forming a minority government under Prime Minister Chris Watson. When finally passed in December 1904, the Commonwealth Conciliation and Arbitration Act 1904, purported to cover State railway employees with "Industrial dispute" defined as "including disputes in relation to employment upon State Railways".

The NSW Rail Traffic Employees Association was, as the name suggests, a union that represented railway employees of the State of NSW and only those employees and sought to be registered under the Commonwealth Act. Another union, the Federated Amalgamated Government Railway and Tramway Service Association, objected to the registration of the NSW union and the issue was referred to the High Court. Higgins KC who appeared for the respondent union, in arguing that the Act was valid, relied not only on the conciliation and arbitration power, but also submitted that railways were vital to interstate trade and commerce and as such was an exercise of the trade and commerce power. Isaacs represented the Commonwealth in his capacity as the then Attorney-General, also arguing for validity based on both the conciliation and arbitration power and the trade and commerce power. NSW and Victoria intervened to argue that the Conciliation and Arbitration Act 1904 was invalid in so far as it purported to include State railway servants.

The High Court had held in D'Emden v Pedder that salary receipts of federal government employees were not subject to state stamp duty, holding that a State parliament could not fetter, control, or interfere with, the free exercise of the legislative or executive power of the Commonwealth. Griffith CJ, delivering the judgment of the Court said

In considering the respective powers of the Commonwealth and of the States it is essential to bear in mind that each is, within the ambit of its authority, a sovereign State, subject only to the restrictions imposed by the Imperial connection and to the provisions of the Constitution, either expressed or necessarily implied... a right of sovereignty subject to extrinsic control is a contradiction in terms. It must, therefore, be taken to be of the essence of the Constitution that the Commonwealth is entitled, within the ambit of its authority, to exercise its legislative and executive powers in absolute freedom, and without any interference or control whatever except that prescribed by the Constitution itself... It follows that when a State attempts to give to its legislative or executive authority an operation which, if valid, would fetter, control, or interfere with, the free exercise of the legislative or executive power of the Commonwealth, the attempt, unless expressly authorized by the Constitution, is to that extent invalid and inoperative.

== Decision ==
The High Court held that the doctrine of inter-governmental immunities worked both ways, that is, that the States were also immune from Commonwealth laws. To regulate the terms and conditions of the engagement, employment and remuneration of the State railway servants was to interfere with the control of the State railways and the doctrine of implied inter-governmental immunities operated to protect the States from legislative or executive action by the Commonwealth which "would fetter, control, or interfere with, the free exercise" of the legislative or executive power of the States. Griffiths CJ again delivered the judgement of the Court, which emphasised the federal nature of the Constitution, stating that "The Constitution Act is not only an Act of the Imperial legislature, but it embodies a compact entered into between the six Australian Colonies which formed the Commonwealth. ... the Constitution as framed was to be, and was, submitted to the votes of the electors of the States."

The statement in the decision as to what was "intended by the framers of the Constitution" is a reference to the judges experience as leading participants in the Constitutional Conventions in which their Honours are properly seen as among the framers of the Constitution.

== Aftermath ==
The Labor party twice attempted to overcome this decision by way of a constitutional amendment to give it the power to make laws with respect to conciliation and arbitration for prevention and settlement of industrial disputes in relation to employment in the railway service of a State referendums. The first attempt, in 1911 was part of an omnibus of changes under the heading of trade and commerce. The 1911 referendum fell well short of the required double majority, with just 39% of voters in favour and approval in only one State. The second proposal in 1913 was essentially the same, however the amendments were broken up into six separate questions. The Railway servants case was one of the High Court decisions identified by the Attorney-General, Billy Hughes, to have cut down the Commonwealth's powers until they were futile. Voter support significantly increased, however still fell short of the required double majority, achieving neither a majority of voters nor approval in the majority of states.

Results
Question	NSW	Vic	Qld	SA	WA	Tas	States in favour	Voters in favour	Result
(4) Trade and Commerce	No	No	No	No	Yes	No	1:5	39%	Not carried
(11) Railway Disputes	No	No	Yes	Yes	Yes	No	3:3	49%	Not carried

The High Court emphatically rejected the doctrine of implied inter-governmental immunities in the 1920 Engineers' Case after changes in the composition of the Court. The Court now insisted on adhering only to the language of the constitutional text read as a whole in its natural sense and in light of the circumstances in which it was made: there was to be no reading in of implications by reference to the presumed intentions of the framers. In particular, since there is no mention of "reserved State powers," only one express inter-governmental immunity (regarding property taxes: section 114), and, an express provision asserting the superiority of valid Commonwealth laws over inconsistent State laws (section 109), there was no longer any room for the doctrine previously asserted in favour of the States. The Court of Conciliation and Arbitration subsequently made an award that was binding on State railway authorities and in 1930 the High Court upheld the validity of that award.

== See also ==
- Australian constitutional law
- List of High Court of Australia cases
