= Melbourne Corporation v Commonwealth =

Judgement of the High Court of Australia

- Court: High Court of Australia
- Full case name: The Lord Mayor, Councillors and Citizens of the City of Melbourne v The Commonwealth and Another
- Decided: 13 August 1947
- Citations: [1947] HCA 26, (1947) 74 CLR 31

Court membership
- Judges sitting: Latham CJ, Rich, Starke, Dixon, McTiernan, Williams JJ

Case opinions
- (5:1) Any Commonwealth law that is otherwise valid under a head of power in s51 or some other part of the Constitution will be invalid if it denies the existence or ability of a State to govern itself or the federal structure of the Commonwealth or singles out any one State

Melbourne Corporation v Commonwealth, also known as the Melbourne Corporation case or the State banking case, is an important case in Australian constitutional law. It stands for the proposition that there are limits on the scope of express Commonwealth legislative powers which can be implied from the federal character of the Constitution.

== Principle ==
The Melbourne Corporation principle is an implied limit on Commonwealth legislative power under the Constitution of Australia.

The principle renders constitutionally invalid any Commonwealth law that is otherwise valid under a head of power in s51 or some other part of the Constitution if it:

1. Places a special burden on the states;
2. Significantly impairs, curtails or weakens the capacity of states or state agencies to exercise their constitutional powers or functions.

== Significance ==
This constitutional protection is one of the few reliable protections in the Australian Constitution against legislative and executive power, the other main protection being the Chapter III Separation of Powers Doctrine.

== Recent developments ==
The recent case of Austin v Commonwealth conflated the original two-limbed test of the original case into an expanded 1st limb so that a commonwealth law that affects a state's ability to administer itself is constitutionally invalid.

== See also ==
- Re Australian Education Union
