= Hartley Williams =

Australian judge

His Honour Sir Hartley Williams (15 October 1843 – 12 July 1929), was a Supreme Court of Victoria judge.

Williams was born in Collingwood, Victoria, the second son of Sir Edward Williams and his wife Jessie, Lady Williams, née Gibbon. He was educated at Repton School and Trinity College, Oxford, where he graduated in 1866. He entered as a student at the Inner Temple in January 1863, and was called to the Bar in April 1867. In the same year he returned to Victoria and was admitted a barrister of the Supreme Court of that colony in April 1868. He very quickly took a leading position as a common law pleader, and twice unsuccessfully contested St. Kilda for a seat in the Victorian Legislative Assembly in 1874. Subsequent to this he took no part in politics, but was raised to the Bench of the Supreme Court in July 1881.

Williams retired in May 1903 and left the next month for England; he died in London on 12 July 1929.

== Bibliography ==
- Williams, Hartley, Sir, 1843-1929 (1885), Religion without superstition, George Robertson (quite contrary to the beliefs of his namesake)
