= Amalgamated Society of Engineers v Adelaide Steamship Co Ltd =

Judgement of the High Court of Australia

- Court: High Court of Australia
- Full case name: The Amalgamated Society of Engineers v The Adelaide Steamship Company Limited and Ors
- Decided: 31 August 1920
- Citations: (1920) 28 CLR 129; [1920] HCA 54

Case history
- Prior action: none
- Subsequent action: Minister for Trading Concerns (WA) v Amalgamated Society of Engineers [1923] AC 170

Court membership
- Judges sitting: Knox CJ, Isaacs, Higgins, Gavan Duffy, Rich & Starke JJ

Case opinions
- (5:1) the States, when parties to an industrial dispute in fact, are subject to the Commonwealth legislation passed pursuant to s 51(xxxv) of the Constitution. (per Knox CJ, Isaacs, Rich & Starke JJ; Higgins J concurring separately; Gavan Duffy J dissenting)

Laws applied
- This case overturned a previous ruling
- Federated Amalgamated Government Railway & Tramway Service Association v NSW Rail Traffic Employees Association [1906] HCA 94, (1906) 4 CLR 488.

Amalgamated Society of Engineers v Adelaide Steamship Co Ltd, commonly known as the Engineers case, was a landmark decision by the High Court of Australia on 31 August 1920. The immediate issue concerned the Commonwealth's power under s 51(xxxv) of the Constitution but the court did not confine itself to that question, using the opportunity to roam broadly over constitutional interpretation.

Widely regarded as one of the most important cases ever decided by the High Court of Australia, it swept away the earlier doctrines of implied intergovernmental immunities and reserved state powers, thus paving the way for fundamental changes in the nature of federalism in Australia.

== Background ==
=== Facts ===
The Engineers case arose out of a claim lodged by the Amalgamated Society of Engineers against the Adelaide Steamship Company in the Commonwealth Court of Conciliation and Arbitration for an award relating to 844 employers across Australia. In Western Australia, the employers included three governmental employers. The question was whether a Commonwealth law made under the "conciliation and arbitration" power regarding industrial disputes, section 51(xxxv), could authorise the making of an award binding the three employers. The case came before the Full Court on a case stated under the Judiciary Act.

=== Previous approach to constitutional interpretation ===
The three original judges of the High Court, Griffith CJ, Barton and O'Connor JJ, and the two new judges appointed in 1906, Isaacs and Higgins JJ, had all been leading participants in the Constitutional Conventions and all are properly seen as among the framers of the Constitution, The Court described the Constitution as "framed in Australia by Australians, and for the use of the Australian people", thus when the Court spoke of what framers of the Constitution knew, intended or expected, they were referring to their personal experience in that process, and not to the intention or knowledge of the Imperial Parliament in passing the Commonwealth of Australia Constitution Act 1900.

In Webb v Outtrim, the Privy Council criticised the High Court's approach to the interpretation of the constitution, holding that the relevant question was not the intention of the Australians who framed the Constitution, but rather what the British Parliament had in mind when it passed the Constitution Act. Despite the criticism, and the challenge by the new appointments to the Court from 1906, the original members of the High Court maintained and continued their approach to constitutional interpretation.

=== Implied intergovernmental immunities ===
The original High Court tended to employ the US jurisprudence governing intergovernmental immunity, expressing it as an implied immunity of instrumentalities, where neither the Commonwealth nor State governments could be affected by the laws of the other. This was first expressed in D'Emden v Pedder, Deakin v Webb, and the Railway Servants' case. As Griffith CJ declared in the first case:

In considering the respective powers of the Commonwealth and of the States it is essential to bear in mind that each is, within the ambit of its authority, a sovereign State, subject only to the restrictions imposed by the Imperial connection and to the provisions of the Constitution, either expressed or necessarily implied... a right of sovereignty subject to extrinsic control is a contradiction in terms.

=== Reserved state powers ===
The reserved powers doctrine was a principle used in the interpretation of the Constitution that emphasised the context of the Constitution, drawing on principles of federalism, what the court saw as the compact between the newly formed Commonwealth and the former colonies, particularly the compromises that informed the text of the constitution. The doctrine involved a restrictive approach to the interpretation of the specific powers of the Federal Parliament to preserve the powers that were intended to be left to the states.

=== Changes to the composition of the court ===
The appointment or departure of a judge from the High Court can change the dynamics within the court. From 1906 to 1913 there had been five appointments, and the death of O'Connor J in 1912. These changes did not however generally change the approach of the High Court. The first sign of significant change was in the 1919 Municipalities Case where it was held that municipal corporations responsible for the making, maintenance, control and lighting of public streets were not State instrumentalities.

More dramatic consequences flowed, however, from the retirement of Griffith CJ in 1919, the death of Barton J in 1920 and their replacement by Knox CJ and Starke J. The change was described as the departure of statesmen, who interpreted the constitution as a political compact and their replacement by legalists and nationalists, who interpreted it as a legal document.

=== Argument ===
The Engineers were represented by Robert Menzies, then a junior barrister. His account of the hearing in Melbourne on 24 May 1920 before the High Court is that he argued that the government sawmills in Western Australia were not state instrumentalities, as they were trading rather than government enterprises. Menzies records Starke J as describing the argument as nonsense and says

I, in what I later realized to be an inspired moment, replied: 'Sir, I quite agree.' 'Well', intervened the Chief Justice, Chief Justice Knox, never the most genial of interrogators, 'why are you putting an argument which you admit is nonsense?' 'Because' ... 'I am compelled by the earlier decisions of this Court. If your Honours will permit me to question all or any of these earlier decisions, I will undertake to advance a sensible argument.' I waited for the heavens to fall. Instead, the Chief Justice said: 'The Court will retire for a few minutes.' And when they came back, he said, 'This case will be adjourned for argument at Sydney. Each government will be notified so that it may apply to intervene. Counsel will be at liberty to challenge any earlier decision of this Court!'

Writing in 1995, Brennan CJ had access to the notebooks of both Knox CJ and Isaacs J, from which he concluded that "It seems quite clear that Menzies lit the fuse in Melbourne, though the main charge for exploding the notion of reciprocal supremacy seems to have been prepared by Isaacs and Rich JJ. in the Municipalities Case. Yet it was Leverrier's, rather than Menzies' advocacy which seems to have had the greatest impact".

== Judgment ==
The joint majority judgment of Knox CJ, Isaacs, Rich & Starke JJ was delivered by Isaacs J and its authorship is commonly attributed to him based on its style which was long, rhetorical and polemic. Higgins J wrote a separate opinion but came to a similar conclusion. Gavan Duffy J dissented.

The joint majority opinion of the Court reviewed the jurisprudence of the Griffith Court and declared:

The more the decisions are examined, and compared with each other and with the Constitution itself, the more evident it becomes that no clear principle can account for them. They are sometimes at variance with the natural meaning of the text of the Constitution; some are irreconcilable with others, and some are individually rested on reasons not founded on the words of the Constitution or on any recognized principle of the common law underlying the expressed terms of the Constitution, but on implication drawn from what is called the principle of 'necessity', that being itself referable to no more definite standard than the personal opinion of the Judge who declares it.

The judgment then returned to first principles on how the Constitution is to be interpreted. The use of American precedent was rejected in favour of applying the settled rules of construction that gave primacy to the text of the Constitution and anchored its interpretation to its express words.

Some "reservations" were made about State prerogatives and special Commonwealth powers (like over taxation); the reservations eventually became subsumed within some general intergovernmental immunity rules to emerge as the Melbourne Corporation doctrine.

The Court considered its earlier decision in D'Emden v Pedder, which had been the foundation case for the original intergovernmental immunities doctrine. It has been said that the Engineers case attacks the reasoning in D'Emden, but rationalises the conclusion. A later case (Attorney-General for Queensland v Attorney-General for the Commonwealth) that applied D'Emden was attacked as resting on opinions "as to hopes and expectations respecting vague external conditions".

The joint majority judgment then went on to establish that the Crown in its various capacities is bound by the Constitution. The power of the Commonwealth to bind the States was seen as an aspect of the general conclusion. Its reasoning invoked the notion of the one and indivisible Crown, which is no longer part of Australian jurisprudence, but that conclusion is capable of being reached without such a notion.

Passages of the joint majority judgment discuss the paramountcy of Commonwealth law, which foreshadow the later expansion of Constitution s109 inconsistency doctrine in Clyde Engineering Co Ltd v Cowburn: The language of the D'Emden v Pedder non-interference principle lives on in the second ("rights impairment") test of inconsistency.

== Significance ==
Former Chief Justice of Australia Sir Anthony Mason has written:

The combination of literal interpretation and a broad construction of Commonwealth powers led to the Commonwealth assuming a dominant position in the Australian federation vis-a-vis the states. The Engineers case ushered in a period of literal interpretation of the Constitution. Literal interpretation and legalism (of which Sir John Latham was the chief exponent) were characteristic of the Court's constitutional interpretation for the greater part of the 20th century.

The decision has had its critics. In 1937, R.T.E. Latham wrote:

It cut off Australian constitutional law from American precedents, a copious source of thoroughly relevant learning, in favour of crabbed English rules of statutory interpretation, which are one of the sorriest features of English law, and are... particularly unsuited to the interpretation of a rigid Constitution.... The fundamental criticism of the decision is that its real ground is nowhere stated in the majority judgment.

On the question of the use of American and other foreign precedents, Mason wrote:

Before the Engineers case, the Court made considerable use of United States authorities. Following the Engineers case, references to United States authority were much less frequent. The majority remarked: "American authorities... are not a secure basis on which to build fundamentally with respect to our own Constitution [but] in secondary... matters they may... afford considerable light and assistance."

Much later, in the 1980s and the 1990s, the Court made extensive use of foreign authorities and comparative law. This use of foreign precedents was associated with the demise of the Privy Council appeal and the Court's recognition of its responsibility to declare the law for Australia.

Despite the case, doctrine can be based on an implication from the text or structure of the Constitution. Sir Owen Dixon, in particular, was critical of any such overblown reading of the Engineers case in this oft-quoted passage: "The prima-facie rule is that a power to legislate with respect to a given subject enables the Parliament to make laws which, upon that subject, affect the operations of the States and their agencies. That, as I have pointed out more than once, is the effect of the Engineers case stripped of embellishment and reduced to the form of a legal proposition." Earlier, he had written: "We should avoid pedantic and narrow constructions in dealing with an instrument of government and I do not see why we should be fearful about making implications."

Writing in 1971, Windeyer J made the following assessment of the Engineers case:

The Colonies which in 1901 became States in the new Commonwealth were not before then sovereign bodies in any strict legal sense; and certainly the Constitution did not make them so. They were self-governing colonies which, when the Commonwealth came into existence as a new Dominion of the Crown, lost some of their former powers and gained no new powers. They became components of a federation, the Commonwealth of Australia. It became a nation. Its nationhood was in the course of time to be consolidated in war, by economic and commercial integration, by the unifying influence of federal law, by the decline of dependence upon British naval and military power and by a recognition and acceptance of external interests and obligations. With these developments the position of the Commonwealth, the federal government, has waxed; and that of the States has waned. In law that is a result of the paramount position of the Commonwealth Parliament in matters of concurrent power. And this legal supremacy has been reinforced in fact by financial dominance. That the Commonwealth would, as time went on, enter progressively, directly or indirectly, into fields that had formerly been occupied by the States, was from an early date seen as likely to occur. This was greatly aided after the decision in the Engineers case, which diverted the flow of constitutional law into new channels. I have never thought it right to regard the discarding of the doctrine of the implied immunity of the States and other results of the Engineers case as the correction of antecedent errors or as the uprooting of heresy. To return today to the discarded theories would indeed be an error and the adoption of a heresy. But that is because in 1920 the Constitution was read in a new light, a light reflected from events that had, over twenty years, led to a growing realization that Australians were now one people and Australia one country and that national laws might meet national needs. For lawyers the abandonment of old interpretations of the limits of constitutional powers was readily acceptable. It meant only insistence on rules of statutory interpretation to which they were well accustomed. But reading the instrument in this light does not to my mind mean that the original judges of the High Court were wrong in their understanding of what at the time of federation was believed to be the effect of the Constitution and in reading it accordingly. As I see it the Engineers case, looked at as an event in legal and constitutional history, was a consequence of developments that had occurred outside the law courts as well as a cause of further developments there. That is not surprising for the Constitution is not an ordinary statute: it is a fundamental law.

Constitutional scholar, Nicholas Aroney, has been critical of Isaacs' reasoning inconsistent with the Court's jurisprudence:

Prior to the case, the High Court had interpreted the Constitution with regard to its character as a federal compact between the peoples of the separate colonies of Australia, a conception that the judges no doubt considered to be in line with the consensus of opinion among the framers of the Constitution. However, in the Engineers' Case, the High Court under the intellectual leadership of Isaacs J insisted that the Constitution was rather to be understood as a statute of the Imperial Parliament and was to be interpreted as such, according to ordinary principles of statutory interpretation. The Court thus rejected the American theories and precedents with which federalism was associated and insisted that specifically British political ideas and exegetical methods should inform and guide the Court. In substitution for the American idea of federalism, the Court asserted that the British system of parliamentary responsible government was especially fundamental to the system

The Engineers case has also had an important legacy on the High Court's use of comparative (particularly American) cases in developing federalism. In particular, it has isolated Australian federalism case law from the insights of federalism from the United States Supreme Court.

== See also ==
- List of High Court of Australia cases
