= Isaac Isaacs =

Australian politician, lawyer, and judge (1855–1948)

The Right Honourable Sir Isaac Isaacs GCB GCMG KC
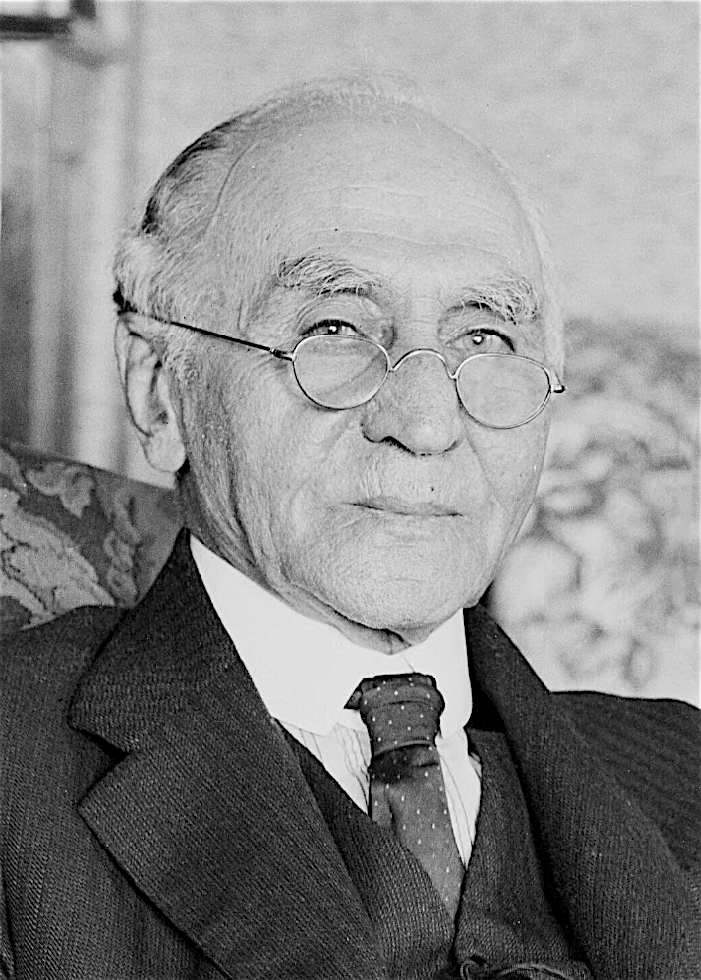
- Isaacs in 1936

9th Governor-General of Australia
- In office 22 January 1931 – 23 January 1936
- Monarchs: George V Edward VIII
- Prime Minister: James Scullin; Joseph Lyons
- Preceded by: The Lord Stonehaven
- Succeeded by: The Lord Gowrie

Chief Justice of Australia
- In office 2 April 1930 – 20 January 1931
- Nominated by: James Scullin
- Appointed by: The Lord Stonehaven
- Preceded by: Sir Adrian Knox
- Succeeded by: Sir Frank Duffy

Justice of the High Court of Australia
- In office 12 October 1906 – 2 April 1930
- Nominated by: Alfred Deakin
- Appointed by: Lord Northcote
- Preceded by: Office established
- Succeeded by: Sir Edward McTiernan

Attorney-General of Australia
- In office 6 July 1905 – 10 October 1906
- Prime Minister: Alfred Deakin
- Preceded by: Josiah Symon
- Succeeded by: Littleton Groom

Member of the Australian Parliament for Indi
- In office 29 March 1901 – 12 October 1906
- Preceded by: Office established
- Succeeded by: Joseph Brown

Personal details
- Born: Isaac Alfred Isaacs; 6 August 1855 Melbourne, Colony of Victoria, Australia
- Died: 11 February 1948 (aged 92) Melbourne, Victoria, Australia
- Spouse: Daisy Jacobs (m. 1888)
- Children: 2
- Profession: Barrister, politician and judge

Sir Isaac Alfred Isaacs (6 August 1855 – 11 February 1948) was an Australian lawyer, politician, and judge who served as the ninth governor-general of Australia, in office from 1931 to 1936. He was both the first Australian-born and the first Jewish Governor-General of Australia. He had previously served on the High Court of Australia from 1906 to 1931, including as Chief Justice from 1930.

Isaacs was born in Melbourne and grew up in Yackandandah and Beechworth. He began working as a schoolteacher at the age of 15, and later moved to Melbourne to work as a clerk and studied law part-time at the University of Melbourne. Isaacs was admitted to the bar in 1880, and soon became one of Melbourne's best-known barristers. He was elected to the Victorian Legislative Assembly in 1892, and subsequently served as Solicitor-General under James Patterson, and Attorney-General under George Turner and Alexander Peacock.

Isaacs entered the new federal parliament at the 1901 election, representing the Protectionist Party. He became Attorney-General of Australia in 1905, under Alfred Deakin, but the following year left politics in order to become a justice of the High Court. Isaacs was often in the minority in his early years on the court, particularly with regard to federalism, where he advocated the supremacy of the Commonwealth Government. The balance of the court eventually shifted, and he famously authored the majority opinion in the Engineers case of 1920, which abolished the reserved powers doctrine and fully established the paramountcy of Commonwealth law.

In 1930, Prime Minister James Scullin appointed Isaacs as Chief Justice, in succession to Sir Adrian Knox. Later that year, Scullin nominated Isaacs as his preferred choice for governor-general. The selection of an Australian (rather than the usual British aristocrat) was unprecedented and highly controversial. King George V was opposed to the idea but eventually consented, and Isaacs took office in January 1931 as the first Australian-born holder of the office. He was the first governor-general to live full-time at Yarralumla, and throughout his five-year term was popular among the public for his frugality during the Depression. Isaacs was Australia's first Jewish High Court Justice and the first Jewish Chief Justice of Australia, in addition to being the first Jewish Governor-General of Australia.

== Early life ==
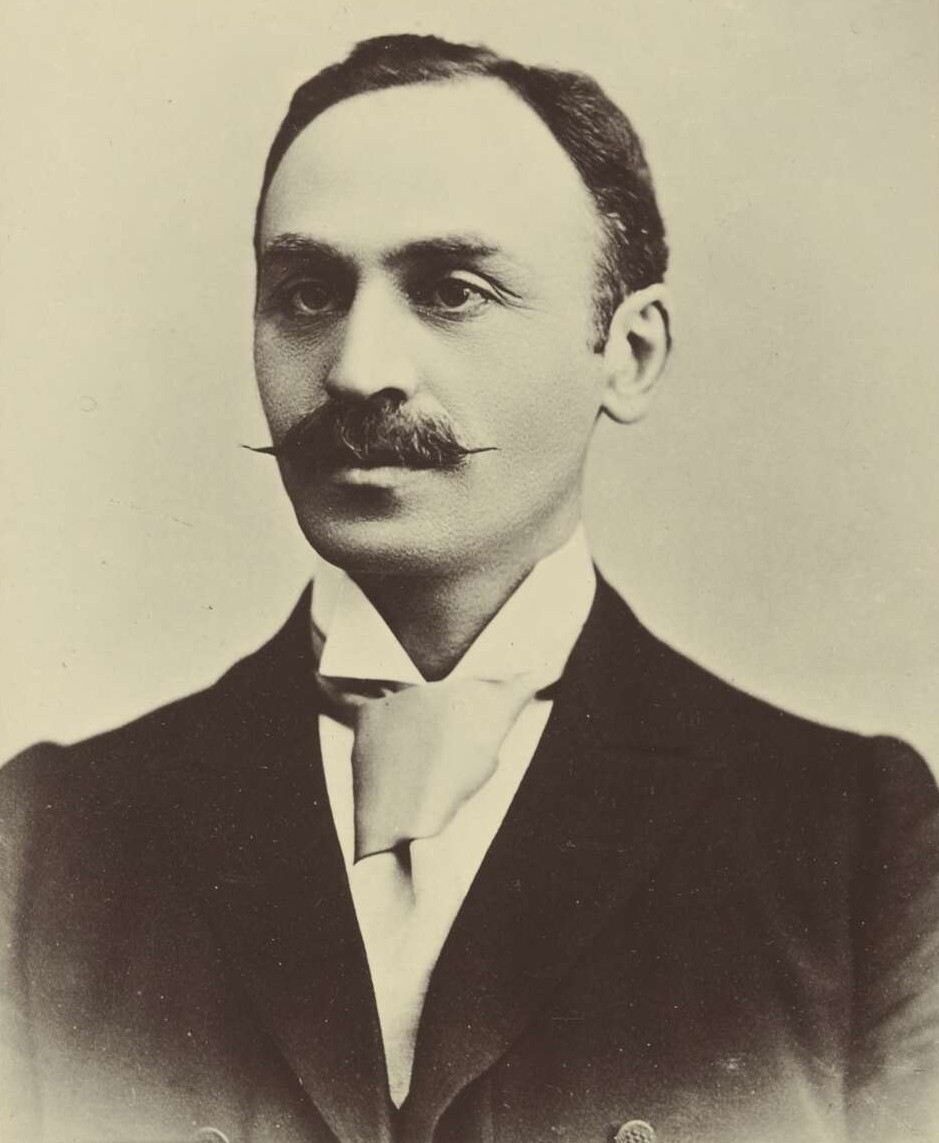
Isaacs in the 1898 Australasian Federal Convention album.

Isaacs was the son of Alfred Isaacs, a tailor of Jewish ancestry from the town of Mława, Poland. Seeking better prospects, Alfred left Poland and worked his way across Germany, spending some months in Berlin and Frankfurt. By 1845 he had passed through Paris and arrived to work in London, where he met the London-born Rebecca Abrahams; the two married in 1849. After news of the 1851 Victorian gold rush reached England, Australia became a very popular destination and the Isaacs decided to emigrate. By 1854 they had saved enough for the fare, departing from Liverpool in June 1854 and arriving in Melbourne in September. Some time after arriving the Isaacs moved into a cottage and shopfront in Elizabeth Street, Melbourne, where Alfred continued his tailoring. Isaac Alfred Isaacs was born in this cottage on 6 August 1855. His family moved to various locations around Melbourne while he was young, then in 1859 moved to Yackandandah in northern Victoria, close to family friends. At this time Yackandandah was a gold mining settlement of 3,000 people.

Isaac was the eldest of six children. His brother John A. Isaacs, who later became a solicitor and Victorian Member of Parliament, and sisters Carolyn and Hannah were all born in Yackandandah. A brother was born in Melbourne, and another sister was born in Yackandandah, but both died very young. His first formal schooling was from sometime after 1860 at a small private establishment. At eight he won the school arithmetic prize, winning his photograph by the schoolmaster, who was also a photographer and bootmaker. Yackandandah state school was opened in 1863 and Isaacs enrolled as a pupil. Here he excelled academically, particularly in arithmetic and languages, though he was a frequent truant, walking off to spend time in the nearby mining camps. To help Isaacs gain a better quality education, in 1867, his family moved to nearby Beechworth first enrolling him in the Common school then in the Beechworth Grammar School. He excelled at the Grammar School, becoming dux in his first year and winning many academic prizes. In his second year he was employed part-time as an assistant teacher at the school, and took up after school tutoring of fellow students. In September 1870, when Isaacs was just 15 years old, he passed his examination as a pupil teacher and taught at the school from then until 1873. Isaacs was next employed as an assistant teacher at the Beechworth State School, the successor to the Common school.

While employed at the State School, Isaacs had his first experience of the law, as an unsuccessful litigant in an 1875 County Court case. He disputed a payment arrangement with the headmaster of his school, resigning as part of the dispute. After returning to teaching, now back at the Grammar School, he expanded his interest in the law; reading law books and attending court sittings.

As a child Isaacs became fluent in Russian, which his parents spoke frequently, as well as English and some German. Isaacs later gained varying degrees of proficiency in Italian, French, Greek, Hindustani and Chinese.

== Legal career ==
In 1875, Isaacs moved to Melbourne and found work at the Prothonotary's Office of the Law Department. In 1876, while still working full-time, he began studying law part time at the University of Melbourne. He graduated with first-class honours in 1880 and was called to the bar that same year. He began practising law in 1882 and wrote court reports for the press to supplement his income. He obtained a Master of Laws degree in 1883. His law practice became successful and by 1890 he was taking briefs on behalf of clients such as banks, the stock exchange, land and finance companies, and local authorities, and appeared before the Full Supreme Court nineteen times that year. During the 1890s he appeared in cases involving tort, contract, insurance, insolvency, mining, and local government law. He took silk as a Queen's Counsel in 1899.

== Political career ==
=== Victorian MP, 1892–1901 ===
In 1892 Isaacs was elected to the Victorian Legislative Assembly as a liberal. He was the member for Bogong from May 1892 until May 1893 and between June 1893 and May 1901. In 1893 he became Solicitor-General in the Patterson ministry. From 1894 to 1899 he was Attorney-General in the Turner ministry, and served as acting Premier on some occasions. In 1897 he was elected to the convention to approve the terms of the Australian Constitution. However, he was not elected to the committee drafting the constitution; Alfred Deakin attributed this failure to "a plot discreditable to all engaged in it" and thought that this antagonising and humiliating snub sharpened Isaacs's "tendency to minute technical criticism ... so as to bring him not infrequently into collision" with the committee. Isaacs had many reservations about the draft constitution, but he campaigned in support of it after the Australian Natives' Association gave the draft its full support, rejecting his plea to delay for further consideration.

=== Federal MP, 1901–1906 ===
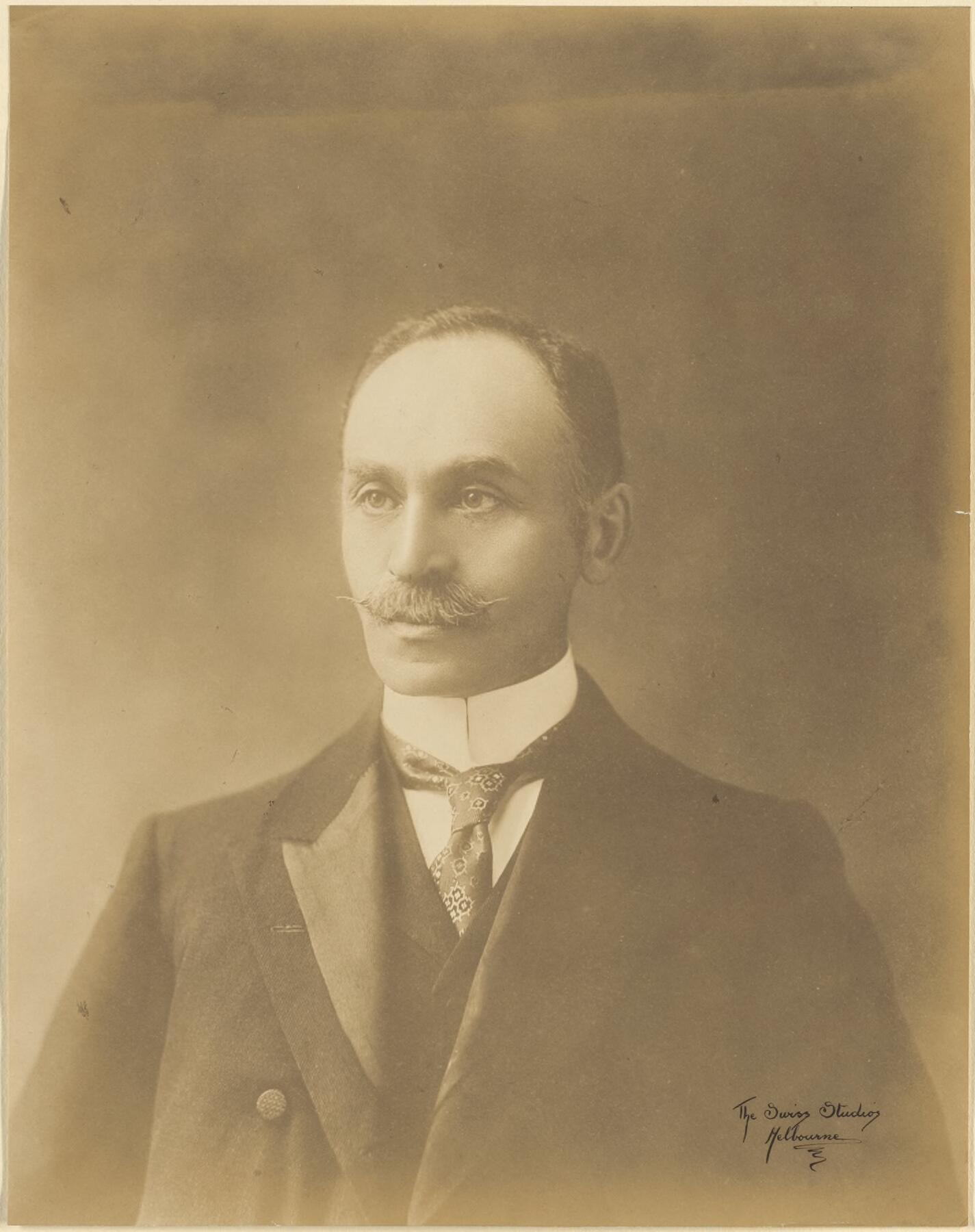
Isaacs during his time as a federal MP

Isaacs was elected to the first federal Parliament in 1901 to the seat of Indi as a critical supporter of Edmund Barton and his Protectionist government. He was one of a group of backbenchers pushing for more radical policies and he earned the dislike of many of his colleagues through what they saw as his aloofness and rather self-righteous attitude to politics.

Alfred Deakin appointed Isaacs Attorney-General in 1905 but he was a difficult colleague and in 1906 Deakin was keen to get him out of politics by appointing him to the High Court bench. He was the first serving minister to resign from the parliament.

== High Court, 1906–1931 ==
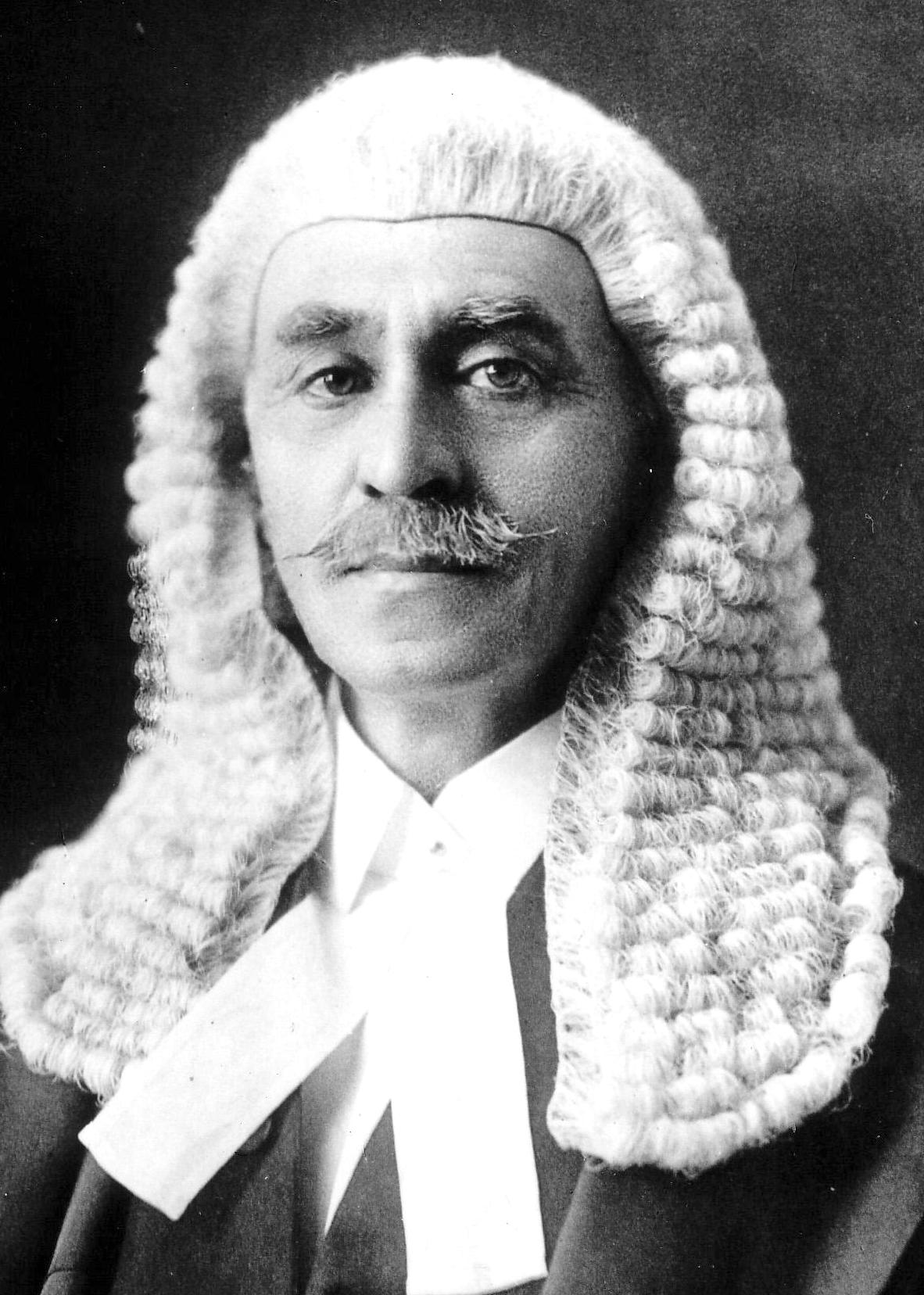
Isaacs as a High Court judge

On the High Court, Isaacs joined H. B. Higgins as a radical minority on the court in opposition to the chief justice, Sir Samuel Griffith. He served on the court for 24 years. During his time on the court, Isaacs and Higgins were frequently a dissenting minority. Griffith and Sir Edmund Barton both strongly disliked Isaacs and opposed his constitutional interpretations. Isaacs was one of the earliest Australian federal judges to recognise the social implications of decision-making, and spelled out social and economic policies in his judgments. While on long leave in the United Kingdom, Isaacs was sworn of the Privy Council in 1921. He became a member of the Judicial Committee of the Privy Council three years later. Isaacs was appointed a Knight Commander of the Order of St Michael and St George in the 1928 Birthday Honours for his service on the High Court. Isaacs is one of only eight justices of the High Court to have served in the Parliament of Australia prior to his appointment to the court; the others were Edmund Barton, Richard O'Connor, H. B. Higgins, Edward McTiernan, John Latham, Garfield Barwick, and Lionel Murphy. He was also one of two to have served in the Parliament of Victoria, along with Higgins. In April 1930, the Labor Prime Minister, James Scullin, appointed the 75-year-old Isaacs as chief justice, succeeding Sir Adrian Knox. He was appointed an Associate Knight of Grace of the Order of the Hospital of St John of Jerusalem in 1931.

== Governor-General, 1931–1936 ==
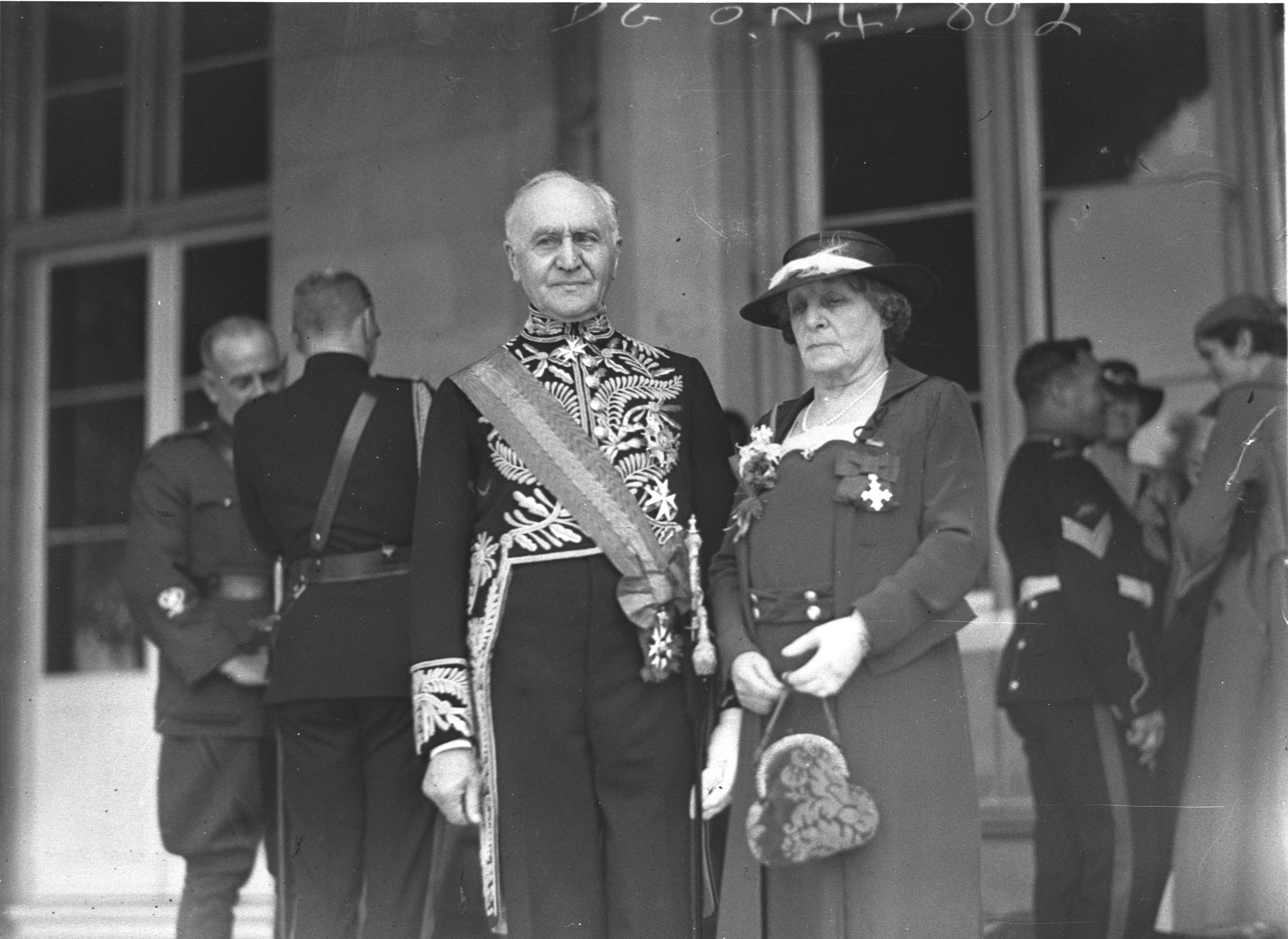
Isaacs in his viceregal uniform, standing with his wife, Sydney, ca. 1934.

Shortly after Isaacs became Chief Justice, the office of governor-general fell vacant and, after Cabinet discussion, Scullin offered the post to Isaacs. Although the proposal was supposed to be confidential until communicated to King George V, word got out. While Isaacs was personally esteemed, public opinion divided strongly over whether a governor-general should be an Australian, with perceived risks of local political bias. During Scullin's 1930 trip to Europe he personally advised the King to make the appointment and, although the King shared the concern about local political bias, he reluctantly accepted Scullin's advice, while noting in his diary that he thought the choice would be “very unpopular” in Australia.

Isaacs's appointment was announced in December 1930, and he was sworn in on 22 January 1931. He was the first Australian-born governor-general. Thus Isaacs agreed to a reduction in salary and conducted the office with great frugality. He gave up his official residences in Sydney and Melbourne and most official entertaining. Although he was sworn into office in the chamber of the Victorian Legislative Council in Melbourne, rather than in Parliament House in Canberra, he was the first governor-general to live permanently at Government House, Canberra. This was well-received with the public, as was Isaacs's image of rather austere dignity. Isaacs was promoted to a Knight Grand Cross of the Order of St Michael and St George in April 1932. His term as governor-general concluded on 23 January 1936, and he retired to Victoria. In 1937, he was further honoured with the award of Knight Grand Cross of the Order of the Bath.

== Personal life ==
Isaacs married Deborah "Daisy" Jacobs, daughter of a tobacco merchant, at her parents' home in St Kilda on 18 July 1888. They had two daughters, born in 1890 and 1892; Marjorie Isaacs Cohen (who died in 1968 and was survived by a son, Thomas B. Cohen), and Nancy Isaacs Cullen. Lady Isaacs died at Bowral, New South Wales, in 1960.

== Later life and death ==
Isaacs was 81 when his term ended in 1936, but his public life was far from over. He remained active in various causes for another decade and wrote frequently on matters of constitutional law. In the 1940s he became embroiled in controversy with the Jewish community both in Australia and internationally through his outspoken opposition to Zionism. His principal critic was Julius Stone. Isaacs was supported by Rabbi Jacob Danglow (1880–1962) and Harold Boas. Isaacs stated that Judaism was a religious identity and not a national or ethnic one. He opposed the notion of a Jewish homeland in Palestine. Isaacs said "[p]olitical Zionism to which I am irrevocably opposed for the reasons which will be found clearly stated, must be sharply distinguished from religious and cultural Zionism to which I am strongly attached."

Isaacs opposed Zionism partly because he disliked nationalism of all kinds and saw Zionism as a form of Jewish national chauvinism—and partly because he saw the Zionist agitation in Palestine as disloyalty to the British Empire, to which he was devoted. Following the King David Hotel bombing in 1946, he wrote that "the honour of Jews throughout the world demands the renunciation of political Zionism". Isaacs's main objections to Political Zionism were:

1. "A negation of Democracy, and an attempt to revert to the Church-State of bygone ages.
2. Provocative of anti-Semitism.
3. Unwarranted by the Balfour Declaration, the Mandate, or any other right; contrary to Zionist assurances to Britain and to the Arabs and in present conditions unjust to other Palestinians politically and to other religions.
4. As regards unrestricted immigration, a discriminatory and an undemocratic camouflage for a Jewish State.
5. An obstruction to the consent of the Arabs to the peaceful and prosperous settlement in Palestine of hundreds of thousands of suffering European Jews, the victims of Nazi atrocities; and provocative of Muslim antagonism within and beyond the Empire, and consequently a danger to its integrity and safety.
6. Inconsistent in demanding on one hand, on a basis of a separate Jewish nationality everywhere Jews are found, Jewish domination in Palestine, and at the same time claiming complete Jewish equality elsewhere than in Palestine, on the basis of a nationality common to the citizens of every faith."

Isaacs said "the Zionist movement as a whole...now places its own unwarranted interpretation on the Balfour Declaration, and makes demands that are arousing the antagonism of the Muslim world of nearly 400 millions, thereby menacing the safety of our Empire, endangering world peace and imperiling some of the most sacred associations of the Jewish, Christian, and Muslim faiths. Besides their inherent injustice to others these demands would, I believe, seriously and detrimentally affect the general position of Jews throughout the world".

In his later years, Isaacs became embroiled in legal battles with Edna Davis, the wife of his brother John. He forced her out of the family home, reclaimed her wedding ring which she had pawned, and finally had her declared a vexatious litigant.

Isaacs died at his home in South Yarra, Victoria, in the early hours of 11 February 1948, at the age of 92. He was the last surviving member of Alfred Deakin's 1905–1906 Cabinet. The Commonwealth government accorded him a state funeral, held on 13 February, and he was buried in Melbourne General Cemetery after a synagogue service.

== Honours ==
In May 1949 he was honoured with the naming of the Australian Electoral Division of Isaacs in the outer southern suburbs of Melbourne. At a redistribution in November 1968, the electorate was abolished and a separate Division of Isaacs was created in the south-eastern suburbs of Melbourne. It exists to this day. The Canberra suburb of Isaacs was named after him in 1966.

In 1973 Isaacs was honoured with an Australian postage stamp bearing his portrait.

== Bibliography ==
- Isaacs, Isaac (1901), The new agriculture, Melbourne: Department of Agriculture
- Isaacs, Isaac (1902), Opinion of the Hon. Isaac A. Isaacs, K.C., M.P., re the case of Lieutenant Witton., Melbourne – via Trove
- Isaacs, Issac (1938), The Riverina Transport case, Melbourne: Australian Natives' Association, Victorian Board of Directors
- Isaacs, Isaac (1939), Australian democracy and our constitutional system, Melbourne: Horticultural Press
- Isaacs, Isaac (1943), An appeal for a greater Australia : the nation must itself take power for its post-war reconstruction; the constitutional issue stated; dynamic democracy, Melbourne: Horticultural Press
- Isaacs, Isaac (1946), Referendum powers: a stepping stone to greater freedom, Melbourne
- Isaacs, Isaac (1946), Palestine : peace and prosperity or war and destruction? Political Zionism : undemocratic, unjust, dangerous, Melbourne: Ramsey Ware Publishing – via Trove

== Sources ==
- Cowen, Zelman (1993). Isaac Isaacs. St Lucia, Queensland: University of Queensland Press.
- Gordon, Max (1963). Sir Isaac Isaacs. Adelaide: Heinemann.
- Isaacs, Sir Isaac (1946). Palestine: Peace and Prosperity or War and Destruction? Political Zionism: Undemocratic, Unjust, Dangerous. Ramsay Ware Publishing.

Government offices
| Preceded by Josiah Symon | Attorney-General of Australia; 1905–1906 | Succeeded by Littleton Groom |
| Preceded by Lord Stonehaven | Governor-General of Australia; 1931–1936 | Succeeded by Lord Gowrie |
Parliament of Australia
| New division | Member for Indi; 1901–1906 | Succeeded by Joseph Brown |
Legal offices
| Preceded by Sir Adrian Knox | Chief Justice of Australia; 1930–1931 | Succeeded by Sir Frank Gavan Duffy |
