= Plaintiff M70 v Minister for Immigration =

Judgement of the High Court of Australia

Plaintiff M70/2011 v Minister for Immigration and Citizenship
- Court: High Court of Australia
- Full case name: Plaintiff M70/2011 & Plaintiff M106 of 2011 by his Litigation Guardian v Minister for Immigration and Citizenship
- Decided: 31 August 2011
- Citations: [2011] HCA 32, (2011) 244 CLR 144

Case opinions
- Majority: Gummow, Hayne, Crennan, Bell JJ the Minister's declaration about Malaysia was invalid, as Malaysia didn't meet the s198A(3)'s criteria of being a country legally bound to process and protect asylum seekers and refugees French CJ the Minister's requisite opinion for the declaration; that being Malaysia was a country that met the s198(3) criteria, was formed on an incorrect understanding of the section's requirements. Ergo it was tainted with jurisdictional error Kiefel J (concurring with JJ)
- Dissent: Heydon J

Plaintiff M70 is a 2011 decision of the High Court of Australia. The lawsuit concerned an injunction sought by multiple Afghan asylum seekers against immigration minister Chris Bowen. The injunction was to prevent Bowen from deporting the plaintiffs to Malaysia, pursuant to s198A of the Migration Act (a provision since repealed). The purpose of the deportation was to avoid their asylum application from being assessed by Australia.

The court decided that the Commonwealth government did not have lawful authority to force resettlement of the plaintiffs to Malaysia. The Migration Act's s198A deportation power required a declaration be first made by the Minister about the recipient country's refugee protections; and it was found this declaration had been made invalidly. A majority found that Malaysia was unable to be declared a safe country for asylum seekers pursuant to s198A, due to Malaysia not being bound to protect refugees either at domestic or international law. As Bowen's declaration was legally invalid, it followed he lacked power to order their deportation.

The case is notable in Australian Administrative Law for the High Court's comments about jurisdictional fact, error, and statutory interpretation. It is also of historic importance to Australian refugee jurisprudence.

Politically, the case was a major defeat for the Gillard Labor government. It had the effect of dismantling the 'Malaysian solution', an important plank within the government's policy toward asylum seekers. It was also a major political and diplomatic embarrassment for the government. A year after the decision, the Gillard Labor government passed legislation re-establishing offshore processing centres on Nauru and in Papua New Guinea.

== Facts ==
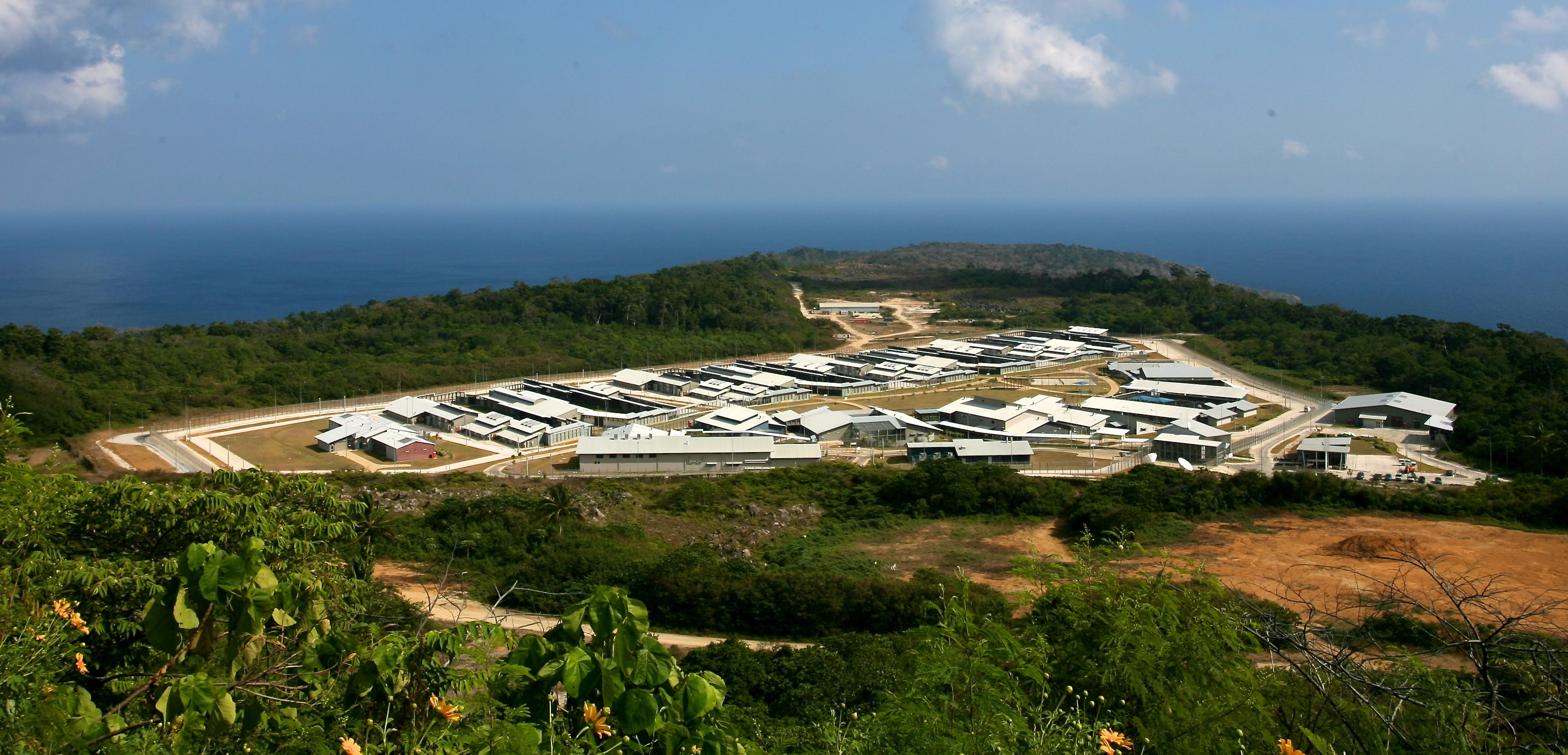
Christmas Island immigration detention centre

The plaintiffs had traveled from Afghanistan to Christmas Island. M70 was an adult, and M106 was an unaccompanied minor. As the plaintiffs had arrived without visas, they held the legal status as 'unlawful non-citizens' due to the Migration Act. Christmas Island had special legal status from the act as an 'excised offshore place'. Therefore, the plaintiffs were additionally assigned the status of being 'offshore entry persons' by the act; as a consequences of them having entered Australia at Christmas Island whilst being unlawful non-citizens. This enabled an immigration official to exercise a discretion to detain the plaintiffs under s189(3) of the act.

As people assigned 'offshore entry person' status, neither plaintiff was allowed to apply for a visa except at the discretion of the Minister. He didn't consider granting that permission. Neither was he obliged to.

In July 2011 the Commonwealth made an arrangement with the Malaysian government. The terms of the arrangement were that the Commonwealth would transfer 800 asylum seekers whom had irregularly arrived by sea to Malaysia, where their claims for refugee protection would be carried out by the UN High Commissioner for Refugees. In return Australia would accept from Malaysia 4,000 refugees for domestic resettlement.

s198(2) of the act imposed a duty on officers to remove those subject to s189(3) detention as soon as possible. Section 198A granted a power to deport 'offshore entry persons', conditional on a declaration being first made about the recipient country under subsection s198A(3). That section enabling the declaration read:

'The Minister may:

(a) declare in writing that a specified country:

(i) provides access, for persons seeking asylum, to effective procedures for assessing their need for protection; and

(ii) provides protection for persons seeking asylum, pending determination of their refugee status; and

(iii) provides protection to persons who are given refugee status, pending their voluntary repatriation to their country of origin or resettlement in another country; and

(iv) meets relevant human rights standards in providing that protection;'

On 25 July 2011, the Minister had used the section to make a declaration that Malaysia was such a country.

In August 2011, an immigration officer determined that M70 would be removed from Australia pursuant to the arrangement, while M106 would be removed once support services for unaccompanied minors had been established. Neither plaintiff would go to Malaysia voluntarily.

The plaintiffs invoked the High Court's original jurisdiction to seek an injunction against the Commonwealth, to restrain it from deporting them to Malaysia. Their arguments were that:

1. The only source of power to take them from Australia was s198A of the Act;
2. That power is conditioned upon a valid declaration having been made under s198A(3) of the Act;
3. The declaration about Malaysia made on 25 July 2011 was not validly made because the four criteria were jurisdictional facts which did not exist; or alternatively, that they were facts of which the Minister had to be satisfied of before making a declaration, and he was not satisfied because he had misconstrued the criteria.

The Commonwealth's case was that the s198A(3) criteria were not requisite facts. Instead, it claimed the Minister was merely required to form, in good faith, an evaluation of Malaysia that he could then declare to be true.

== Judgment ==
=== Gummow, Hayne, Crennan & Bell JJ ===
The majority accepted the plaintiff's construction of the act, finding that s198A(3) required certain jurisdictional facts to be established. It was not enough for the Minister to have a good faith subjective opinion about the criteria.

They found that access and protections to which the s198A(3)(i) - (iii) criteria referred; 'needed to be provided as a matter of legal obligation'. Further, they were understood to refer to access and protections mirroring those that Australia had undertaken by signing onto the Refugees Convention and Refugees Protocol. With respect to s198A(3)(i); It was not enough for Malaysia to have allowed the UNHCR to undertake refugee protection assessment procedures; without providing for those procedures at domestic law or being bound at international law to do so. Similarly, Malaysia could not be found to provide protections of the kind described in (ii) or (iii) unless its domestic law expressly dealt with refugees, or was internationally obliged to protect refugees. Australia's arrangement with Malaysia didn't oblige Malaysia at international law to provide any of those rights, (as it was not a treaty) and additionally there wasn't even a provision within the arrangement ensuring that those rights would be provided.

In summation the majority wrote:

'As already explained, the references in s 198A(3)(a) to a country that provides access and provides protection are to be construed as references to provision of access or protection in accordance with an obligation to do so. Where, as in the present case, it is agreed that Malaysia: first, does not recognise the status of refugee in its domestic law and does not undertake any activities related to the reception, registration, documentation and status determination of asylum seekers and refugees; second, is not party to the Refugees Convention or the Refugees Protocol; and, third, has made no legally binding arrangement with Australia obliging it to accord the protections required by those instruments; it was not open to the Minister to conclude that Malaysia provides the access or protections referred to in s 198A(3)(a)(i) to (iii). The Minister's conclusions that persons seeking asylum have access to UNHCR procedures for assessing their need for protection and that neither persons seeking asylum nor persons who are given refugee status are ill-treated pending determination of their refugee status or repatriation or resettlement did not form a sufficient basis for making the declaration. The jurisdictional facts necessary to making a valid declaration under s 198A(3)(a) were not and could not be established.' - Gummow, Hayne, Crennan & Bell JJ

With respect to plaintiff M106, the majority found that his deportation was additionally prevented by the 'IGOC Act'; as it restrained his deportation unless prior written consent was first obtained from his guardian, the minister. Consent had not been provided.

=== Chief Justice French ===
Chief Justice French differed in his construction of the act from the majority, in that he did not accept the plaintiff's statutory construction that the section required the establishment of certain jurisdictional facts. Rather, the decision maker's evaluative judgement was itself the jurisdictional fact. However, a mandatory consideration for that evaluation, was the domestic law of the proposed receiving country and its binding commitments under international law. This evaluation was required to be done with respect to the section's four criteria, as they ought be properly understood.

He then found that in making his declaration, the Minister was obligation to consider the domestic laws of the specified country, and the international laws to which it had bound itself. French CJ found that the words used in the act's criteria such as 'provides access ... to effective procedures', 'protection', and 'relevant human rights standards', were indicative of a requirement to assess the country's relevant laws. It was then found that based upon the information upon which the Minister had acted, and on his affidavit; it was clear that he did not look to Malaysia's legal obligations either domestically, or internationally; as a basis for his declaration. No evidence was provided showing that the Minister had paid attention to the legal fragility of an 'exemption order' under the Malaysian Immigration Act, or to other associated legal risks to transferees. Instead, his decision had been informed by conversations with his Malaysian ministerial counterpart, and observations by DFAT about contemporary practices of Malaysia toward asylum seekers.

For that reason French CJ found the Minister's s198A(3) declaration was tainted by jurisdictional error, and therefore found invalid. As the declaration was invalid, no power existed for the Commonwealth to deport the plaintiffs to Malaysia via s198A(1). Nor would it be possible for the plaintiffs to be removed to Malaysia under s198(2), without an officer first making an assessment as to whether the person was someone to whom Australia owed protection obligations.

=== Justice Kiefel ===
Like the majority, Kiefel J found that s198A(3)(a) had the effect of shifting some of Australia's responsibilities under the refugee convention to another country. She found its 'evident concern' was that Australia's obligations under the convention were not breached in that process. Further, she found that s198A(3)(a)(i) referred to a country that recognized the status of refugees; and didn't merely require that the country ensure that an asylum-seeker have access to an assessment of refugee status by an NGO. That requirement had the consequence of implying that the country recognises the status of refugees and gives effect to the convention. Kiefel found that such recognition and protection is put into effect by laws, and so the minister's decision was to be made with reference to those laws. A practical assessment of a country's practices regarding refugees, could not replace the requirement that the country oblige itself through law, to provide necessary recognition and protection; in order to be subject to the act's declaration.

As Malaysia did not have laws recognizing and protecting refugees from refoulment and persecution, the facts necessary for making a declaration under s198A(3)(a) did not exist, and the declaration found invalid. Kiefel found additionally that the Minister had misunderstood the nature of the inquiry posed by s198A(3)(a), and therefore had made the decision in jurisdictional error. That being the case, it followed there was no power to remove the plaintiffs to Malaysia.

=== Justice Heydon (dissent) ===
Heydon J found that the s198A(3)(a) was limited to practical conditions in Malaysia, not matters of legal obligation. With regard to the IGOC Act constraining M106's deportation; Heydon found that the act did not require written consent. He further found that he had 'shown by his conduct that he consents to the taking of the second plaintiff from Australia ... it is clear that the Minister most strongly consents to the second plaintiff's departure, and to speak in that fashion is to speak euphemistically.' For these reasons among others, Heydon supported the dismissal of both appeals.

== Aftermath ==
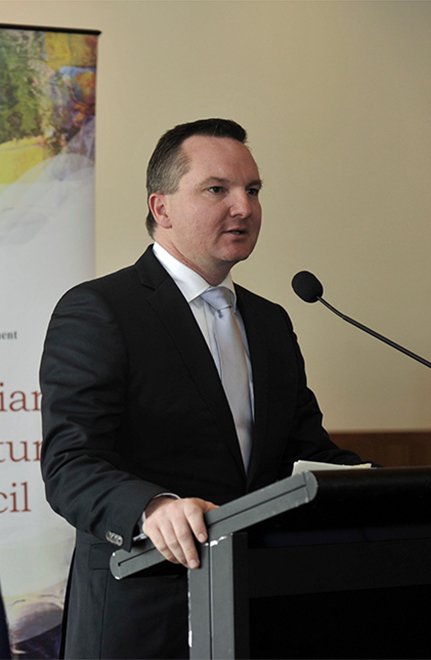
Immigration Minister Chris Bowen, speaking in August 2011

The minister Chris Bowen described the decision as 'profoundly disappointing'. He defended the Government's construction of the Immigration Act, saying that the High Court had 'applied a new test to how protections should be demonstrated'. The result effectively sunk Labor's 'Malaysian solution' scheme, as no valid declaration could be made unless Malaysia would first sign up to the UN Refugee Convention; and there was no prospect of that happening at the time. Legislative amendment was not an option to rescue the scheme, as a government attempt to remove the Migration Act's s198A(3) constraints (replacing it with a sole 'national interest' criterion for a declaration) failed to pass the lower house. That amendment also sought to override the IGOC Act protection that had been found applicable to the unaccompanied minor, M106. The Greens at the time held the balance of power in the lower house.

Controversially, Prime Minister Julia Gillard commented on the decision by saying that the High Court had 'missed an opportunity' in its rejection of the deal. The PM also accused Chief Justice French of having made a ruling inconsistent with his prior judgements. She was criticised for those comments by the Law Council. It released a written statement that read 'it is highly inappropriate to single-out the chief justice for particular criticism ... his honour was one of six judges in the majority and the legal principles established by the case are very clear.' Professor George Williams defended Gillard as having a right to respond to the written judgement, characterizing her comments as those of a 'disappointed litigant'.

The decision was praised by both the Liberal Party as well as the Australian Greens. The opposition shadow immigration minister at the time, Scott Morrison, described the judgement as 'another policy failure by an incompetent government' he added;

'I've been to Malaysia ... It was clear to me that the protections the Minister boldly claimed existed, simply didn't exist. ... He's been found out by the High Court, and as a result the Government's asylum and border policy is a complete and utter mess.'

Greens Senator Sarah Hanson-Young said that the decision had vindicated her party's position on the deal.

There is no publicly available information as to the plaintiff's reaction to the decision, although 'clapping and cheering' was heard from inside the detention centre following the result according to ABC News journalist Jane Norman. Matthew Albert, the lead counsel for the plaintiff was asked at an LIV forum what would happen following the decision. He spoke of the 'sombre' task he had of telling his clients that whilst they would not be deported to Malaysia; they would remain indefinitely detained and be at the mercy of the Government. What eventually happened of the persons M70 and M106 is unknown to the general public.

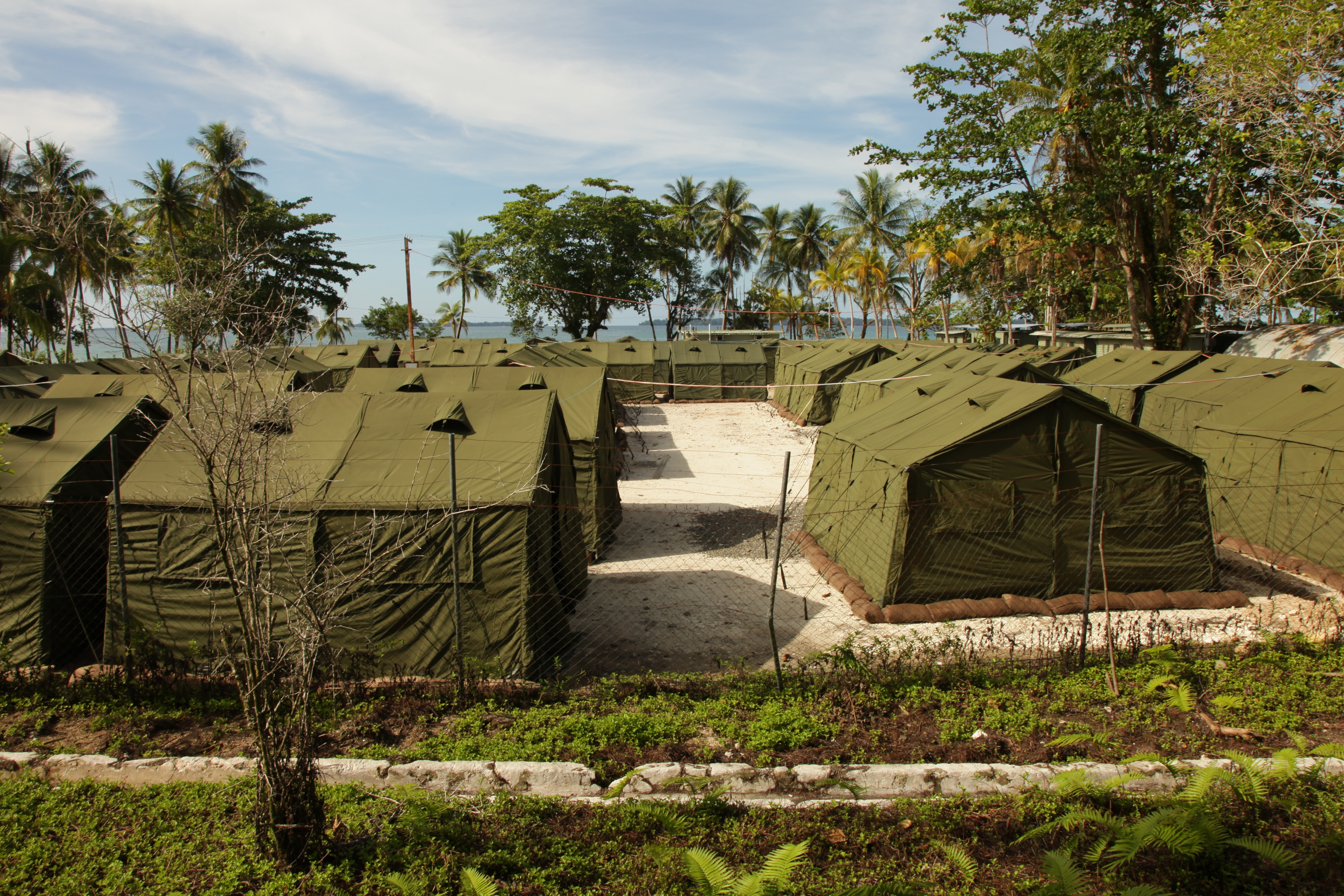
Manus Island detention cente, as reopened in 2012

Julian Burnside QC (also at the LIV forum) remarked of the decision by saying it was 'safe to say that offshore processing is no longer an option for the Government'. In actuality, the Gillard Labor government responded the following year by reopening Manus island offshore detention facilities. This was in spite of those facilities being only recently shut down by the first Rudd government in 2008. These facilities were kept open after Rudd regained the office of Prime Minister from Gillard; and the Manus facility became a part of what was referred to as the 'PNG solution'. I.e. Labor's stated policy of preventing any asylum seeker arriving in Australia by boat from ever being domestically settled as refugees. Genuine refugees would be offered asylum in Papua New Guinea, whilst non-genuine asylum seekers would be repatriated, moved to a third country, or remain in indefinite detention. That policy was maintained by the subsequent Coalition government, and as of 2020 indefinite offshore detention at Manus Island remains as Australian Government policy.

The president of the Malaysian Bar association welcomed the decision, writing in a statement that it was a 'reminder to Malaysia of the importance of being a signatory to the Refugee convention and its protocol'.

== See also ==
- PNG Solution
- Christmas Island Detention Centre
- Jurisdictional error
