= Stanley v. Director of Public Prosecutions (NSW) =

Judgement of the High Court of Australia

- Court: High Court of Australia
- Full case name: Stanley v. Director of Public Prosecutions (NSW)
- Citations: [2023] HCA 3, 407 ALR 222

Case opinions
- 4:3
- Majority: Gordon, Edelman, Steward, Gleeson JJ
- Dissent: Kiefel CJ, Gageler J, Jagot J

Stanley v. Director of Public Prosecutions (NSW) is a decision of the High Court of Australia.

The case concerned an administrative law appeal under the writ of certiorari, against a decision of the NSW Court of Appeal to impose a criminal sentence.

== Background ==
Stanley had been convicted and sentenced to three years imprisonment for contraventions of the Firearms Act 1996 (NSW). When this happened, the judge declined to make an 'intensive correction order' (ICO), which would have made the sentence served 'by way of intensive correction in the community'.

The convicted person then appealed to the District Court of NSW against the severity of the sentence. On appeal, which was conducted as a de novo review, they asked the district court to make an ICO. Section 66(2) of the Sentencing Procedure Act provided that 'community safety' is a 'paramount consideration', and that when considering community safety, the court must assess between whether an ICO or full-time detention would be more likely to address an offender's risk of reoffending. The district court dismissed the appeal, without making any express reference or findings in relation to s66(2).

They then appealed to the NSW Court of Appeal under the writ of certiorari, attempting to quash the district court's decision. It found, by majority, that non-compliance with s66(2) did not amount to a jurisdictional error.

== Judgement ==
By 4:3 majority, the High Court allowed the appeal, holding that the jurisdiction to make an ICO calls for a subsequent and separate decision to be made after a decision on sentencing is imposed. It found that the district court failed to consider the 'paramount consideration' of s66(1) by assessing 'community safety' as described in s66(2). From this, the High Court decided that the district court didn't understand the function it was supposed to have performed; and so didn't act within jurisdiction. In doing so the majority said:

"Given the invalidity, there has been no decision on the issue of an ICO at all. As there is a duty to consider whether to grant an ICO in cases where the power is engaged (as it clearly was in this case), this duty remains unperformed. Therefore, the District Court failed to perform its duty and did not determine the appellant's appeal according to law. It was therefore appropriate to set aside the order of the District Court dismissing the appellant's appeal, and order the Court to determine her appeal according to law." - Gordon, Edelman, Steward and Gleeson JJ

The majority then ordered that Stanley's appeal to the NSW District Court be heard and determined according to law.

=== Dissent ===
In three separate dissenting judgements, justices Kiefel, Gageler, and Jagot each wrote in support of dismissing the appeal.

Jagot found that although the District Court judge had not adequately discharged their obligation to give reasons for their decision. However, the mere failure to give reasons was not a jurisdictional error. This failure to give reasons was a separate issue to whether or not the judge had made the assessment required by s66(2) at all. Jagot didn't agree that, in context, it could be argued from the judge's reasons that they'd failed to undertake the assessment at all.

Gageler found that in the context of the whole act, including the construction and intention of s5(4) which preserved the validity of some decisions even in the event of other non-compliance by a court; s66 shouldn't be interpreted as requiring its elements to be treated as jurisdictional facts.

Kiefel found that it 'It is not possible to infer that Parliament intended the obligation under s 66(2) to condition the validity of the sentencing process. Section 66(2) cannot be read in isolation and thereby elevated to a condition upon the exercise of the power under s 7(1)'.
