= Minister for Immigration and Citizenship v SZMDS =

Case in Australian High Court regarding judicial review

- Court: High Court of Australia
- Decided: 26 May 2010
- Citations: [2010] HCA 16, (2010) 240 CLR 611 [2010] HCASum 15
- Transcripts: 31 Jul [2009] HCATrans 183; 10 Nov [2009] HCATrans 301

Case history
- Prior actions: [2008] FMCA 1064, Federal Magistrates Court; [2009] FCA 210, Federal Court

Case opinions
- Majority: Heydon, Crennan & Bell JJ
- Dissent: Gummow ACJ, Kiefel J

Minister for Immigration and Citizenship v SZMDS, is a landmark Australian judgment of the High Court. The matter related to immigration law, jurisdictional error and illogicality as a ground of judicial review.

== Background ==
=== Facts ===
The applicant, known by the code SZMDS, was a citizen of Pakistan who claimed to have engaged in homosexual activities from 2005 to 2007 and that he was fearful of persecution if he returned to Pakistan. He had resided in the United Arab Emirates since 2004. In 2006 he briefly visited the United Kingdom however he did not seek asylum at that time. In 2007 he had returned to Pakistan for three weeks. In 2007 he arrived in Australia and sought asylum as a refugee.

A delegate of the Minister for Immigtration and citizenship was not satisfied that the applicant's claims of homosexuality were credible and decided not to grant him a protection visa.

The applicant applied to the Refugee Review Tribunal, which was created to provide a merits review of decisions relating to the grant of protection visas to persons claiming to be refugees. The Tribunal affirmed the decision not to grant the applicant a protection visa. The Tribunal did not accept the applicant's claims to be a homosexual and found that there was no real chance that he would face persecution if he were to return to Pakistan. In particular the Tribunal found that the applicant's conduct in returning to Pakistan from the United Arab Emirates and his failure to seek protection during his visit to the United Kingdom in 2006 was inconsistent with his claimed fear of persecution arising as a result of his homosexuality. The Tribunal did not accept that the applicant was fearful as a result of such activities or as a result of his homosexuality.

Under the Migration Act 1958 decisions of the Tribunal were final and the merits of the decision could not be challenged in a court. In Plaintiff S157/2002 v Commonwealth, the High Court held that the section did not oust the jurisdiction of the High Court under s75(v) of the Constitution, because it did not extend to decisions affected by jurisdictional error. In order to minimise applications to the High Court, the Migration Act 1958 gave the same jurisdiction to the Federal Court and the Federal Magistrates Court.

=== Prior actions ===
The jurisdictional errors alleged before the Federal Magistrates Court were that

1. The Tribunal did not consider the severe penalties the applicant will face as a homosexual in Pakistan.
2. The Tribunal erred in using unreliable country information.
3. The Tribunal failed to consider the dangers of the applicant if he returned to his home country.

Federal Magistrate Scarlett held that the Tribunal had not committed any jurisdictional error.

The applicant was unrepresented before the Federal Magistrates Court however he was represented by a pro bono Barrister before the Federal Court.

The applicant successfully appealed to the Federal Court, where Moore J held that the Tribunal fell into jurisdictional error by reaching a conclusion on illogical and irrational grounds. What was held to be illogical and irrational about the Tribunal's reasoning was that it assumed others in Pakistan would discover that the applicant was a homosexual during the brief period of his visit without making findings as to how that could be and that, in light of the applicant's explanation, there was no logical connection between his failure to apply for protection in the United Kingdom and his fear of persecution in Pakistan.

The Minister appealed to the High Court and was granted special leave on condition that the Minister pay the applicant's reasonable legal costs in the Federal Court and in the High Court regardless of the outcome.

=== Arguments ===
The Minister and the Tribunal had a narrow discretion, in that if they were satisfied the Applicant met the criteria then a protection visa must be granted and if not satisfied then the protection visa must be refused. The Minister was represented by the Solicitor-General, Gageler SC, who argued that the Tribunal's fact finding was not illogical and that mere illogicality in the course of reaching a conclusion of fact was not an independent ground of review, but rather an inference of jurisdictional error on other grounds. That is illogicality or irrationality must be so extreme as to show that the opinion formed could not possibly be formed by a Tribunal acting in good faith. The applicant was represented by Game SC who argued that whether the applicant met the criteria for a protection visa was a fact on which the Tribunal's jurisdiction depended. The determination of a jurisdictional fact could be reviewed on the grounds that it was "irrational, illogical and not based on findings or inferences of fact supported by logical grounds".

== Judgement ==
=== Irrationality as a ground of judicial review ===
The majority of the High Court, Gummow A-CJ, Kiefel, Crennan and Bell JJ, held that irrationality in the finding of the jurisdictional fact was capable of amounting to a jurisdictional error.

Crennan & Bell JJ held that "In the context of the Tribunal's decision here, "illogicality" or "irrationality" sufficient to give rise to jurisdictional error must mean the decision to which the Tribunal came, in relation to the state of satisfaction required under s 65, is one at which no rational or logical decision maker could arrive on the same evidence." and that "the test for logicality or irrationality must be to ask whether logical or rational or reasonable minds might adopt different reasoning or might differ in any decision or finding to be made on evidence upon which the decision is based." A decision would be illogical or irrational if

- only one conclusion was open on the evidence, and the decision maker did not come to that conclusion;
- the decision to which the decision maker came was simply not open on the evidence; or
- there was no logical connection between the evidence and the inferences or conclusions drawn.

Similarly Gummow A-CJ and Kiefel J held that a decision upon a jurisdictional fact which was arbitrary, capricious, irrational or not bona fide was a failure to exercise jurisdiction that could be reviewed by the courts.

Heydon J held that as the Tribunal's reasoning was not illogical, it was not necessary to decide whether irrationality was a ground of judicial review.

=== Findings of jurisdictional fact ===
The court divided on the question of whether the Tribunals reasons, with the majority, Heydon, Crennan and Bell JJ holding that the Tribunals reasons were not irrational or illogical. Crennan and Bell JJ found that the process of reasoning of the Tribunal was that:

- homosexuals as a social group in Pakistan were the subject of persecution;
- the Tribunal did not believe the applicant's claim he had engaged in the "practice of homosexuality"
- a person with a genuine fear of persecution as a homosexual in Pakistan would not go back to Pakistan and would seek asylum at the first available opportunity.
- it was improbable that the applicant first feared persecution because of homosexuality as he claimed.

Crennan and Bell JJ held that "On the probative evidence before the Tribunal, a logical or rational decision maker could have come to the same conclusion as the Tribunal" and that therefore there was no jurisdictional error.

Heydon J similarly held that the Tribunal's reasons were not limited to the applicant's visits to Pakistan and the United Kingdom, and included that the Tribunal disbelieved the applicant's claim to have engaged in homosexual activities in Australia. In this context the Tribunal did not accept the applicant's explanations for his visits to Pakistan and the United Kingdom was not illogical, whether or not all minds would share that thinking.

Gummow ACJ & Kiefel J dissented on the basis that the reasoning that the applicant was to be disbelieved, particularly in relation to his account of his life in the UAE, was an inference not supported on logical grounds.
