= Judicial review =

Ability of courts to review actions by executive and legislatures

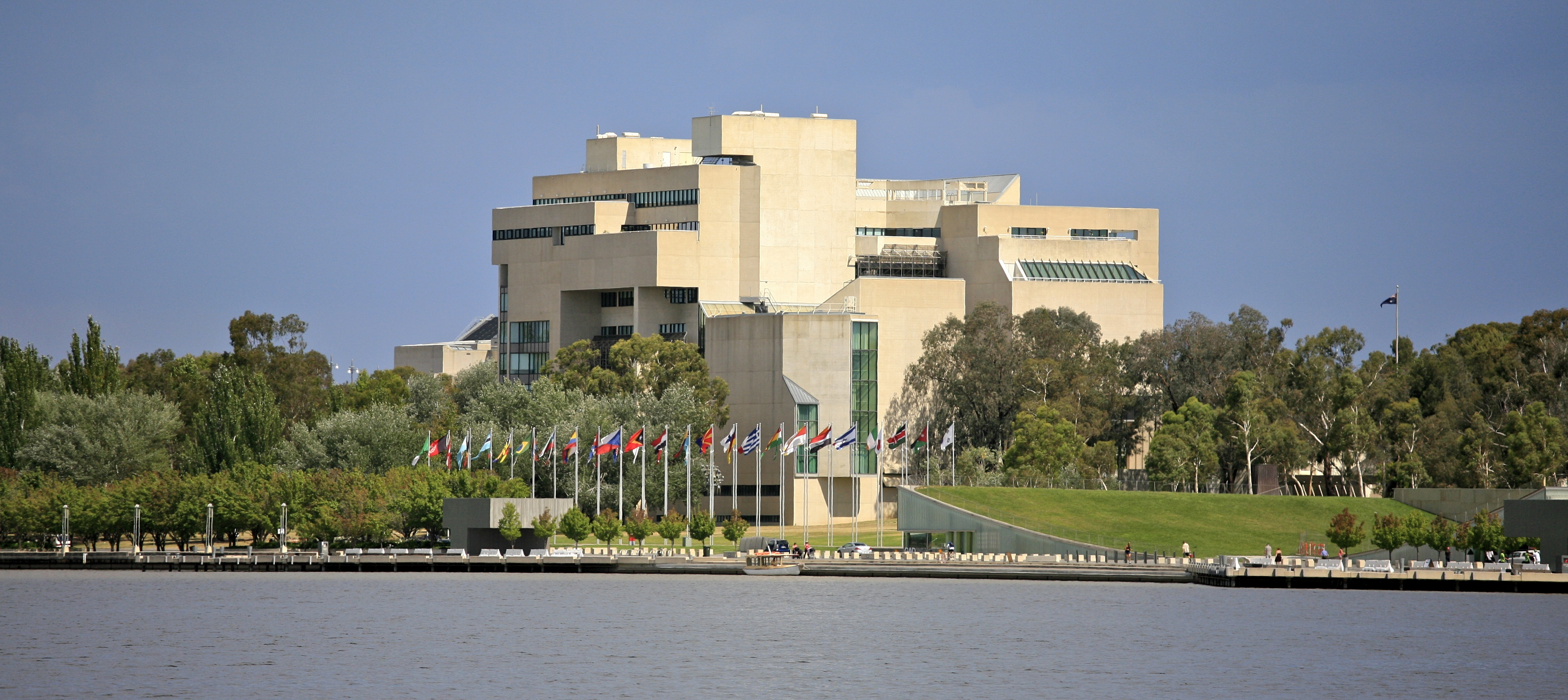
The High Court of Australia. Under the Constitution of Australia, the judiciary forms part of the separation of powers, with executive or legislative actions subject to review by the judiciary. Laws, acts and governmental actions that are incompatible with a higher authority (e.g. the Constitution) can be reviewed and overturned.

Judicial review is a process by which a state's administrative, executive and, in certain jurisdictions, legislative actions are subject to review by the judiciary. In a judicial review, a court supervises and assesses the legality of governmental action, administrative decision-making and certain types of legislation. The range of acts which might be subject to judicial review, as well as the reasons for which they might be held unlawful, varies significantly between different jurisdictions. In most jurisdictions, however, courts in judicial review assess the compatibility of lower-range laws with superior forms of law. For example, an executive decision may be invalidated for being incompatible with primary legislation, or a statute may be invalidated for violating the terms of a constitution.

In Enlightenment-based traditions of constitutionalism, judicial review is conceived of as one of the checks and balances central to the notion of separation of powers: it is the role of the judiciary to ensure that the executive and legislative branches of government exercise their powers within the limits set by the law. The doctrine varies between jurisdictions, so the procedure and scope of judicial review may differ between and within countries.

== Background ==
=== History in the Common Law Tradition ===
In the Anglophone legal tradition, the idea that all exercise of executive power should be subject to effective review by independent courts dates back to at least the renaissance, or the reign of Elizabeth I and James I. The principle is traditionally attributed to chapter 29 of Magna Carta, although the practical means of enforcing it were not developed until the sixteenth and seventeenth centuries. It was then that it became well-established, particularly under the influence of Sir Edward Coke, a prominent jurist of the Elizabethan and Jacobean eras, that any exercise of legal discretion (of power granted by law) other than that falling within one of the 'absolute' royal prerogative (e.g. summoning parliaments, making treaties and declaring war) must be lawful and capable of being supervised by courts, particularly for compliance with the Magna Carta (some fundamental judgments establishing these principles include the Case of Proclamations and Dr. Bonham's Case).

The idea that an independent judiciary should have an inherent jurisdiction to review the exercise of power by the executive and legislative branches of government later became central to Enlightenment political thought, particularly in the context of separation of powers. The conception of a government based on the separation of executive, legislative, and judicial powers was popularised by Montesquieu. In Book IX, Chapter 6 of The Spirit of the Laws, inspired by his reflections on the British constitutional system, he introduced, for the first time in modern political theory, the idea that judicial power must be exercised by a distinct and independent branch of the state. This tradition of thinking informed the drafting of the U.S. constitution, particularly as regards the necessity of an independent body having a power to review laws for compatibility with the constitution. Although the U.S. constitution, as ultimately drafted, did not codify the power of federal courts to conduct judicial review, that step was taken by the Supreme Court in the seminal Marbury v. Madison decision, deciding that the Court had the power to enforce the separation of powers stated in the US Constitution and to review legislation to that end. This was left uncontested by the U.S. Congress and president Thomas Jefferson, although Jefferson later expressed doubts as to whether the constitution gave exclusive power to (unelected) courts (as opposed to the executive or legislative branches) to conduct judicial review of legislation.

=== Fundamental Ideas ===
Separation of powers is based on the idea that no branch of government should be able to exert power over any other branch without due process of law; each branch of government should have a check on the powers of the other branches of government, thus creating a regulative balance among all branches of government. The key to this idea is checks and balances. In the United States, judicial review is considered a key check on the powers of the other two branches of government by the judiciary. The judiciary in United States has been described as having unusually strong powers of judicial review from a comparative perspective.

Although the term judicial review may describe the power of the courts to review either legislation or executive acts, or both, some countries with common-law systems do not have judicial review of primary legislation. In the United Kingdom in particular, judges do not have the power to strike down primary legislation, due to a strong attachment to the idea of legislative supremacy. However, when the United Kingdom became a member of the European Union, it eventually became accepted that courts have the power to disapply national law held to be incompatible with EU law or the rulings of the EU Court of Justice. With the passing of the Human Rights Act 1998, which incorporated the European Convention of Human Rights (ECHR) into the British legal order, courts have been granted the power to issue declarations of incompatibility when they find legislation to be inconsistent with the ECHR. Such declarations, when issued, do not have the result of disapplying inconsistent legislation, but rather function as a request to Parliament to remedy the breach through the legislative process.

=== Principles of review ===
When carrying out judicial review of administrative or executive action, one of the fundamental principles of review is described as ultra vires review: the court determines whether the public body actions are within (intra) or outside (ultra) of the powers given to them by legislation (the power's 'vires').

The review of administrative acts by public bodies in judicial review has to be distinguished from a legal appeal. In judicial review, a court is usually not re-taking the decision for itself: rather, it reviews whether the original, challenged decision, has been made in compliance with the relevant law and certain administrative law doctrines, such as procedural fairness or legitimate expectations.

== Types ==
=== Review of administrative acts and secondary legislation ===
Most modern legal systems allow the courts to review administrative actions (individual decisions of a public body, such as a decision to grant a subsidy or to withdraw a residence permit). In most systems, this also includes review of secondary legislation (legally enforceable rules of general applicability adopted by administrative bodies). Some countries (notably France and Germany) have implemented a system of administrative courts which are charged with resolving disputes between members of the public and the administration, whether these courts are part of the administration (France) or judiciary (Germany). In other countries (including the United States and United Kingdom), judicial review is carried out by regular civil courts although it may be delegated to specialized panels within these courts (such as the Administrative Court within the High Court of England and Wales). The United States employs a mixed system in which some administrative decisions are reviewed by the United States district courts (which are the general trial courts), some are reviewed directly by the United States courts of appeals and others are reviewed by specialized tribunals such as the United States Court of Appeals for Veterans Claims (which, despite its name, is not technically part of the federal judicial branch). It is quite common that before a request for judicial review of an administrative action is filed with a court, certain preliminary conditions (such as a complaint to the authority itself) must be fulfilled. In most countries, the courts apply special procedures in administrative cases.

=== Review of primary legislation ===
There are three broad approaches to judicial review of the constitutionality of primary legislation—that is, laws passed directly by an elected legislature.

==== No review by any courts ====
Some countries do not permit a review of the validity of primary legislation. In the United Kingdom, Acts of Parliament cannot be set aside under the doctrine of parliamentary sovereignty, whereas Orders in Council, another type of primary legislation not passed by Parliament, can (see Council of Civil Service Unions v Minister for the Civil Service (1985) and Miller/Cherry (2019)). Another example is the Netherlands, where the constitution expressly forbids the courts to rule on the question of constitutionality of primary legislation passed by the Dutch legislature or States-General.

==== Review by general courts ====
In countries which have inherited the English common law system of courts of general jurisdiction, judicial review is generally done by those courts, rather than specialised courts. Australia, Canada and the United States are all examples of this approach.

In the United States, federal and state courts (at all levels, both appellate and trial) are able to review and declare the "constitutionality", or agreement with the Constitution (or lack thereof) of legislation by a process of judicial interpretation that is relevant to any case properly within their jurisdiction. In American legal language, "judicial review" refers primarily to the adjudication of the constitutionality of statutes, especially by the Supreme Court of the United States. Courts in the United States may also invoke judicial review in order to ensure that a statute is not depriving individuals of their constitutional rights. This is commonly held to have been established in the case of Marbury v. Madison, which was argued before the Supreme Court in 1803.

Judicial review in Canada and Australia pre-dates their establishment as countries, in 1867 and 1901, respectively. The British Colonial Laws Validity Act 1865 provided that a British colony could not enact laws which altered provisions of British laws which applied directly to the colony. Since the constitutions of Canada and Australia were enacted by the British Parliament, laws passed by governments in Australia and Canada had to be consistent with those constitutional provisions. More recently, the principle of judicial review flows from supremacy clauses in their constitutions. In Australia, the term 'judicial review' generally refers to reviews of the lawfulness of the actions of the executive and the public service, while reviews of the compatibility of laws with the Australian Constitution is known as characterisation or constitutional challenges.

In India which also inherited the English common law tradition, the power of judicial review is exercised primarily by the Supreme Court of India and various state High Courts. The constitution of India explicitly grants powers to the Supreme court and State High Courts via articles 13, 32, 226 to examine and invalidate legislation in contravention of constitutional provisions and particularly those which infringe upon the Fundamental Rights. In landmark Supreme Court decision in Kesavananda Bharati v. State of Kerala decided in 1973, The concept of basic structure doctrine was established allowing Supreme Court and High courts to review constitutional amendments and strike them down if found in contravention of basic structure of constitution.

==== Review by a specialized court ====
In 1920, Czechoslovakia adopted a system of judicial review by a specialized court, the Constitutional Court as written by Hans Kelsen, a leading jurist of the time. This system was also adopted the same time by Austria and became known as the Austrian System, also under the primary authorship of Hans Kelsen, being emulated by a number of other countries. In these systems, other courts are not competent to question the constitutionality of primary legislation; they often may, however, initiate the process of review by the Constitutional Court.

Russia adopts a mixed model since (as in the US) courts at all levels, both federal and state, are empowered to review primary legislation and declare its constitutionality; as in the Czech Republic, there is a constitutional court in charge of reviewing the constitutionality of primary legislation. The difference is that in the first case, the decision about the law's adequacy to the Russian Constitution only binds the parties to the lawsuit; in the second, the Court's decision must be followed by judges and government officials at all levels.

== History ==
Judicial review as a contribution to political theory is sometimes said to be a "distinctively American contribution", argued to have been established in the US Supreme Court's decision in Marbury v. Madison (1803). However, "the American version of judicial review was the logical result of centuries of European thought and colonial experience which had made Western [societies] generally willing to admit the theoretical primacy of certain kinds of law and had made Americans in particular ready to provide a judicial means of enforcing that primacy." That is, the "belief in the need to subordinate certain acts of the law-making power to higher, more permanent principles" can be seen, for example, in medieval European scholastics, courts of equity in England, Parlements in France, and Enlightenment philosophers. Moreover, writing in 2005, Treanor argued that "judicial review was much better established in the years immediately after the adoption of the [United States] constitution than has previously been recognized, and it was far from rare ... [and] judicial invalidation of statutes fell into certain patterns." US Chief Justice John Marshall, the author of Marbury v. Madison, "came from Virginia, the state in which [judicial review] was particularly well established by the case law and in which it was repeatedly endorsed during the debate over the Constitution", and thus, on a personal level, Marshall "must have experienced judicial review as long-established". Moreover, "The fact that judicial review was exercised much more frequently than previously recognized in the years before Marbury helps explain why Marshall's assertion of the power to exercise judicial review in the case elicited so little comment."

== In specific jurisdictions ==
The grounds, scope and consequences of judicial review depend on the jurisdiction in which it occurs. The below links examine in detail judicial review across a variety of legal systems, including civil and common law jurisdictions.

- Australian administrative law § Judicial review
- Judicial review in Austria
- Judicial review in Bangladesh
- Judicial review in Canada
- Constitutional Court of the Czech Republic
- Judicial review in Denmark
- Judicial review in English law
- Judicial review in Germany
- Judicial review in Hong Kong
- Judicial review in India
- Judicial review in Ireland
- Judicial review in Japan
- Judicial review in Malaysia
- Judicial review in New Zealand
- Judicial review in Norway
- Judicial review in the Philippines
- Judicial review in Scotland
- Judicial review in South Africa
- Judicial review in South Korea
- Judicial review in Sweden
- Judicial review in Switzerland
- Judicial Yuan (Taiwan / Republic of China)
- Judicial review in the United States
- Judicial supervision (Soviet Union)

== See also ==
- Constitutional review
- Judicial Appeal
- Judicial activism
- Living Constitution
- Originalism
- Unconstitutional constitutional amendment
- Judicial reform
