= Schubert practice =

Mechanism in Swiss law

Schubert practice, also known as the Schubert jurisprudence (less often called Schubert doctrine), is a legal doctrine in Swiss law manifested in a series of decisions of the Federal Supreme Court of Switzerland, according to which provisions of domestic law have practical primacy over otherwise binding, but conflicting, provisions of international law as long as the former are lex posterior – even if the latter are lex specialis – based on a generalized hypothesis that a posterior act of the legislator whereby an existing act of international law has been contradicted was, in reality, a conscious, albeit implicit, act of abrogation. As an immediate consequence, when the doctrine is applied, international law is violated.

It derives from the 1973 Schubert case ruling, in which the Supreme Court upheld the decision of a cantonal authority to forbid an Austrian man from Vienna from acquiring Swiss land, in spite of him asserting entitlement to such acquisition under a 1875 treaty between Switzerland and Austria (then part of Austria-Hungary). The treaty provided that each signatories' nationals shall enjoy the same rights in this regard on both signatories' territories. The court cited a 1961 federal decree which gave authorities the power to grant or withhold authorization of acquisition of land by foreign residents and gave it primacy over the treaty. In response, Austria suspended the concerned article, citing non-fulfillment of reciprocity.

Switzerland, historically, has had a tradition of following the principle of primacy of international law, but its highest judicial body, the Supreme Court, does not have judicial review authority over federal legislation to be able to declare it unconstitutional if it comes in conflict with the Constitution (Cst.) or international law (principle of immunity of federal laws). The emergence of the Schubert practice was thus an attempt to bring into line the will of the Swiss legislator and the obligations arising from international law.

The court doctrine has been much criticized by legal scholars, and has been refined and supplemented over time, particularly in relation to the European Convention on Human Rights (ECHR). After a 1999 ruling, the doctrine was relativized by virtue of being rendered inoperative in the area of international human rights law. In the early 2010s, it seems to have been abandoned. In the realm of politics, there have been multiple initiatives to enshrine the doctrine in law.

== Status of international law in Switzerland ==
=== Primacy of international law ===
==== Federal Constitution of 1874 and the Spengler ruling ====
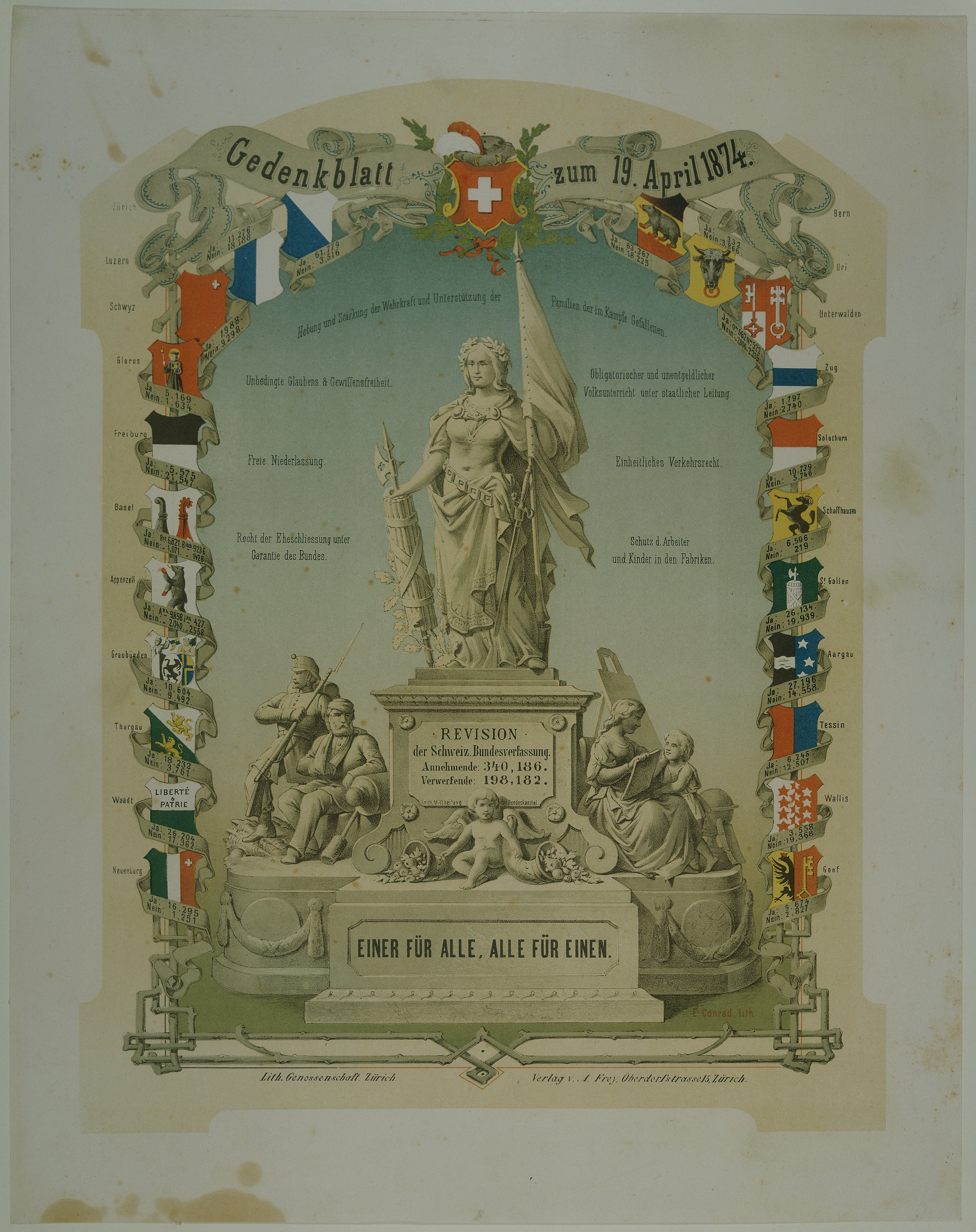
Poster commemorating the total revision of the Federal Constitution in 1874

From 1875 (entry into force of the Federal Constitution of 1874 and institution of the Federal Supreme Court) to 1933, Switzerland's highest judicial body affirmed the principle of the primacy of international law over domestic law, and did so as a matter of course. This is illustrated by the Spengler ruling, in which Mon-Repos (the seat of the Federal Tribunal in Lausanne) states that an international treaty "binds the contracting States by virtue of the universally accepted principles of the law of nations, and without regard to their respective national legislation".

==== Steenworden ruling ====
As early as 1923, with the Lepeschkin ruling, some authors noted that the principle of the primacy of international law over domestic law (and consequently federal laws) was beginning to weaken.

In 1933, the Federal Court made a paradigm shift with the Steenworden ruling, influenced by a dualist conception.

In fact, Henri Steenworden, a Geneva café-brasserie operator, played gramophone records on a daily basis in his establishment. However, as the records were not made in Switzerland (although the ruling does not indicate their precise origin), the French Société des auteurs, compositeurs et éditeurs de musique (SACEM) sued him for copyright infringement. After being condemned by the Geneva Court of Civil Justice, he appealed to the Swiss Federal Court. In its ruling, the Federal Court refers to the Berne Convention for the Protection of Literary and Artistic Works, of 1886, without mentioning which party is invoking it ("Vainement prétendrait-on").

Referring back to the 1923 ruling, the Federal Court states:

"If [...] there were opposition between a federal law and an international convention regulating the same subject, the convention should not necessarily be preferred to the law [...] Their opposition should be resolved as an opposition between two contradictory texts of law, by virtue of the maxim "lex posterior derogat priori". In accordance with this maxim, [...] the recent law paralyzes the application in Switzerland of the contrary provisions of an older treaty". - ATF 59 II 331, consid. 3 p. 337 s.

With this ruling, the Federal Supreme Court applies the principle of lex posterior derogat legi priori ("later law derogates from earlier law") in resolving conflicts between international and national law, sometimes even subsequently applying the principle of lex specialis derogat legi generali ("special law derogates from general law").

==== Lang ruling ====
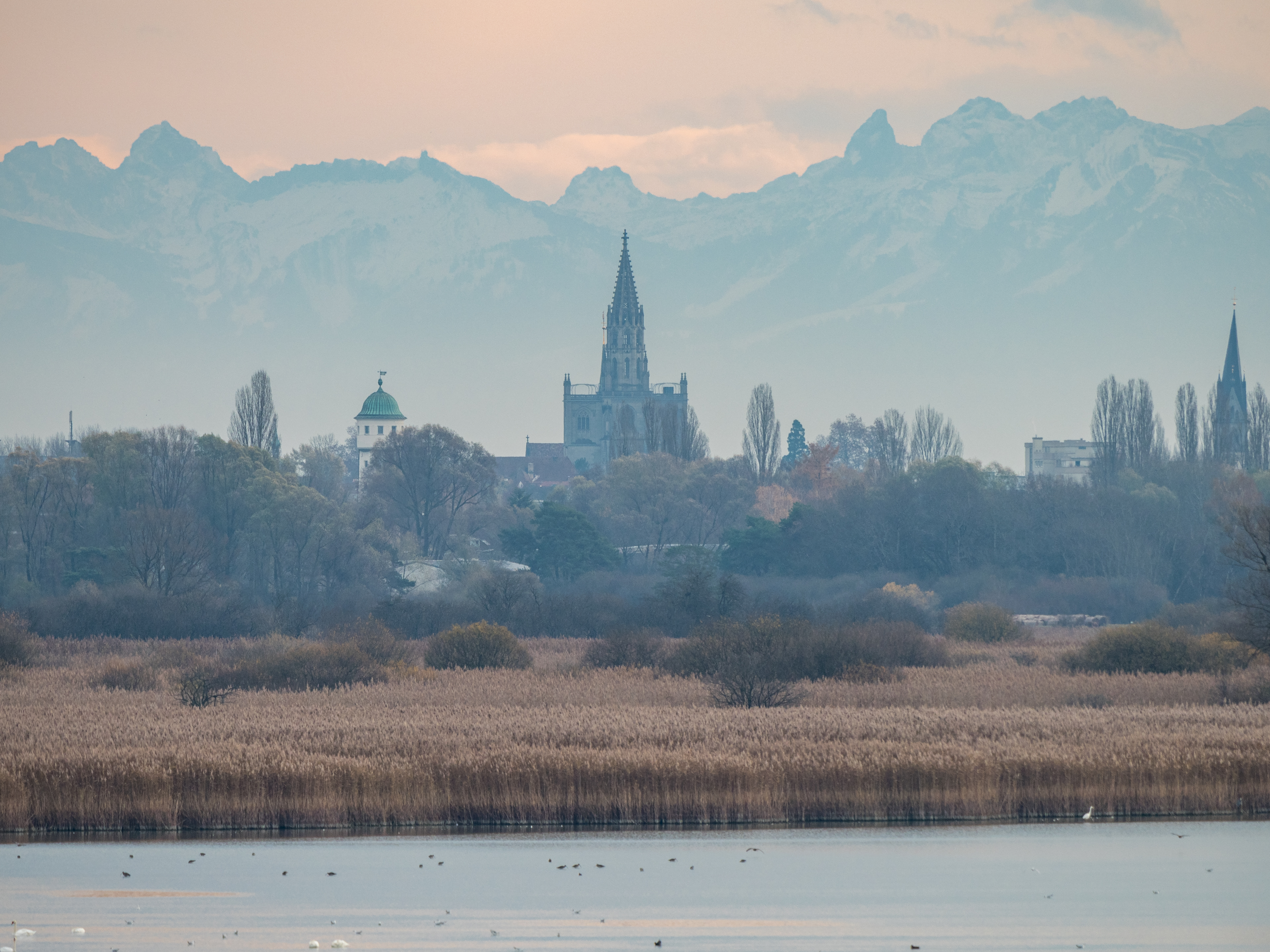
Ried, west of Constance, where the incident between the two airmen Lang and Legler and the hunters took place

Lang and Legler are two Swiss amateur pilots who flew over Lake Constance. At the end of November 1947, a bird-hunting party was organized by boat between Triboltingen (today Ermatingen), the Konstanzer Ried (German shore) and Reichenaustrasse (downtown Constance). The two pilots saw this as an infringement of their right to fly in the area. To scare off the hunters, they made a series of low passes (up to ten meters above water level).

In October 1948, they were convicted of criminal offences by the Kreuzlingen District Court. The conviction was based on the 1919 Convention Relating to the Regulation of Aerial Navigation, a Federal Council decree and art. 237 ch. 2 of the Swiss Criminal Code. (Note: At the time of the offence, Art. 237, para. 1 of the Swiss Criminal Code read as follows: "Anyone who intentionally prevents, disturbs or endangers public traffic, in particular traffic on public roads, by water or in the air, and thereby knowingly endangers the life or physical integrity of persons, shall be punished by imprisonment", and para. 2: "The penalty shall be imprisonment or a fine if the offender has acted negligently" [read online][archive].) They were acquitted on appeal to the Thurgau Supreme Court in April 1949, on the grounds, among others, that the 1919 Convention did not contain any penal provisions. The Thurgau public prosecutor appealed to the Federal Supreme Court against this acquittal.

During its deliberations on the Lang judgment in 1950, the Criminal Court of Cassation of the Federal Supreme Court considered the compatibility of the 1919 Convention with Swiss domestic law. In its reasoning, the Court made no mention of the Steenworden ruling. Instead, it refers to a 1931 ruling (thus preceding Steenworden) to affirm that "international treaty law takes precedence over federal law". (Note: In german: "[…] das Staatsvertragsrecht dem Bundesrecht vorgeht […]".)

With the Lang ruling, the Federal Court thus reaffirmed the primacy of international law over federal law.

==== Frigerio ruling ====
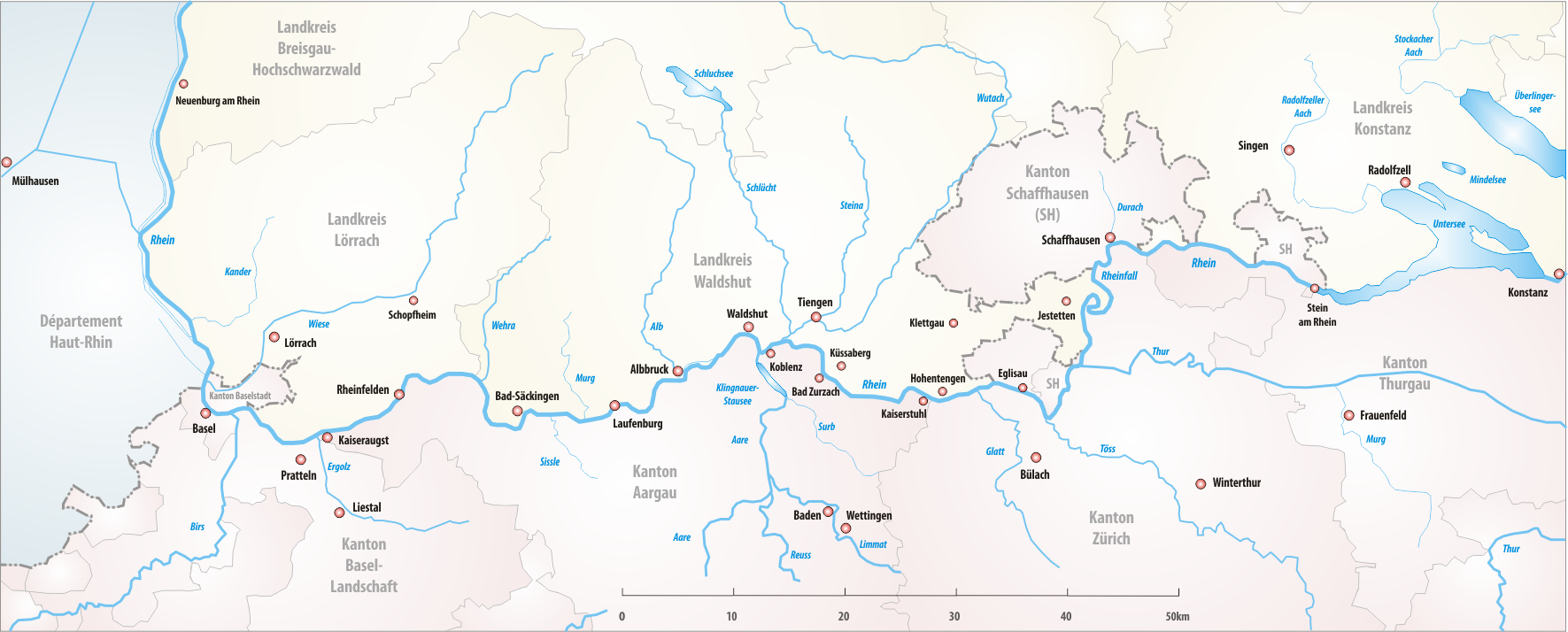
Map of the region crossed by the Haut-Rhin, at the heart of the dispute brought by Frigerio

In 1962, Max Frigerio, a Rhine transport entrepreneur, was granted a concession to transport passengers between Tössegg (confluence of the Töss and Rhine rivers) and Rüdlingen. The concession was later extended downstream to Eglisau. On October 31, 1967, Frigerio filed an application with the then Federal Department of Environment, Transport, Energy and Communications (DETEC, German: Eidgenössisches Departement für Umwelt, Verkehr, Energie und Kommunikation, Italian: Dipartimento federale dell'ambiente, dei trasporti, dell'energia e delle comunicazioni, French: Département fédéral de l'environnement, des transports, de l'énergie et des communications). The purpose of this request was to ascertain that river passenger traffic between Neuhausen am Rheinfall (where the Rhine Falls are located) and Basel was not in any way subject to the granting of a concession.

He bases his reasoning on an agreement signed between Switzerland and the Grand Duchy of Baden on May 10, 1879. Article 1 of the agreement states:

"Navigation and floating on the Rhine, from Neuhausen to below Basel, are permitted to everyone; they are subject only to restrictions required by tax and customs regulations, or by police necessities for the safety and regularity of communications."

In the context of an obiter dictum (Note: An obiter dictum is not constitutive of the legal reasoning of a Federal Supreme Court judgment. In other words, the Federal Court could have reached the same conclusion in the judgment without the obiter dictum. According to Hangartner 2013, p. 701, the function of an obiter dictum is to clarify an abstract point of jurisprudence (not necessarily related to the main dispute), especially when this point is the subject of dispute in the doctrine.) (other things said) in the Frigerio ruling, the FC leaves the door open to the possibility of deviating from international law. It states that international treaties are in force in Switzerland, as long as the legislator does not clearly decide to enact a domestic norm that would be contrary to them; the way is thus paved for the adoption of the Schubert ruling.

=== Monism ===
Switzerland has a monistic system of international law. This means that, in the eyes of Swiss judges, domestic (Swiss) law and international law form a unitary block; international law is an integral part of the law of the domestic legal order. In fact, the 1999 Federal Constitution states that "the Confederation and the Cantons shall respect international law". In contrast, in a dualist system, domestic law and international law are two distinct blocks. According to a dualist system, international law must be translated or transposed into domestic law. (Note: It should be noted here that Art. 5 para. 4 Cst. 1999 emerged from the revision of the Federal Constitution in the 1990s, i.e. after the Federal Court had issued the Schubert ruling which is the subject of this article.)

On an international scale, Art. 26 of the Vienna Convention on the Law of Treaties (VCLT) states that "every treaty in force is binding upon the parties to it, and must be performed by them in good faith" (the principle of pacta sunt servanda). Furthermore, "a party [to a treaty] may not invoke the provisions of its domestic law as justification for its failure to perform a treaty" (art. 27 VCLT). This means that when Switzerland concludes a treaty with another country, or accedes to an international convention (such as the ECHR), it is obliged to respect and implement the provisions of the treaty or convention.

=== Judicial review ===
The Federal Supreme Court has no constitutional authority over federal legislation. In other words, the Federal Supreme Court cannot invalidate a federal law if it is contrary to the Federal Constitution (Cst.), unlike the US Supreme Court with an American act of Congress. Furthermore, the Federal Constitution stipulates that the Federal Supreme Court must apply federal laws and international law.

== Schubert case ==
=== Events ===
Schubert
- Court: Federal Supreme Court of Switzerland
- Full case name: Ruling of March 2nd, 1974 in the case of Schubert v. the Commission cantonale tessinoise de recours for the application of the federal decree of March 23rd, 1961 concerning the acquisition of property from foreign residents.[ATF 99 Ib 39] (Note: In french: Arrêt du 2 mars 1974 dans l'affaire Schubert contre Commission cantonale tessinoise de recours pour l'application de l'arrêté fédéral du 23 mars 1961 concernant l'acquisition de biens de la part de personnes résidentes à l'étranger.)
- Decided: March 3rd, 1973
- Transcript: Transcript of the case in Italian.

Case history
- Prior actions: April 13th, 1972: authorization refused by the court of first instance September 11th, 1972: appeal rejected by the Commission cantonale de recours
- Subsequent action: Uncertainty as to whether it is obsolete.

Case opinions
- An exception to the primacy of international law exists if the legislature enacts a federal law to the contrary and if the legislature is aware of the conflict with international law.

Keywords
- International law, Pacta sunt servanda

In 1972, the appellant, (Note: In Swiss law, the term "appelant" is used for a person lodging an appeal with the Federal Supreme Court, cf. ATF 139 III 120 of February 26th, 2013 [read online] [archive], consid. C p. 120 (appeal in civil matters) or ATF 144 I 43 of November 22nd, 2017 [read online] [archive], consid. B and 2 p. 44 (public law appeal).) Ernst Schubert, an Austrian national living in Vienna, owned two plots of land in the commune of Brissago, Ticino.

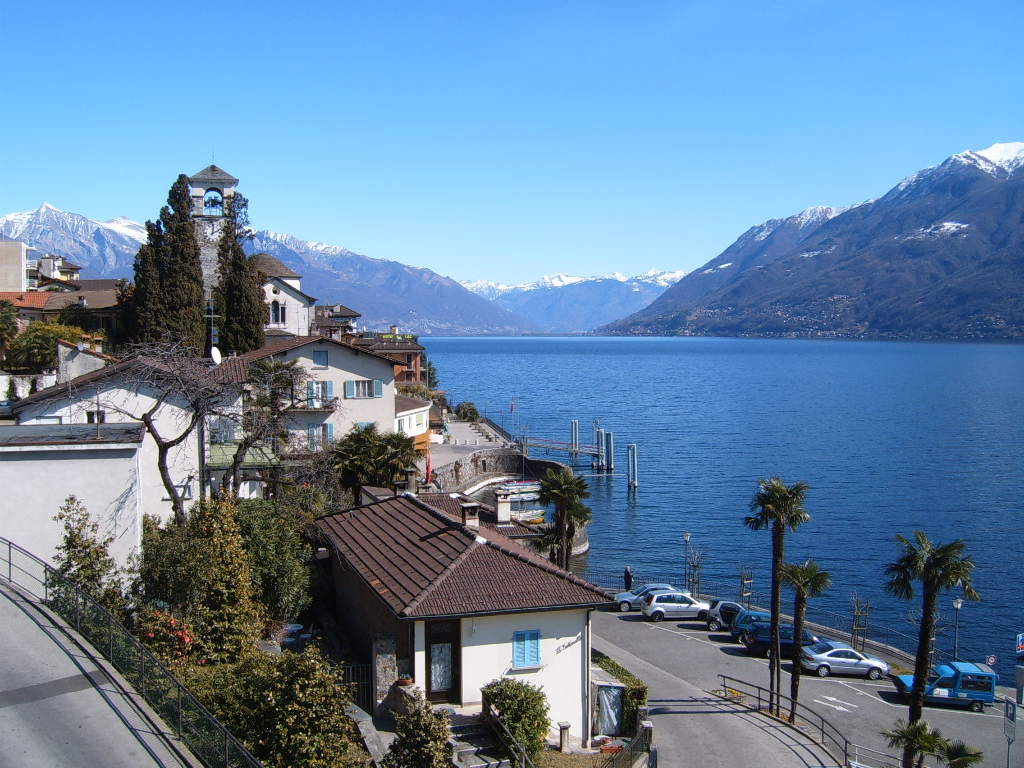
The municipality of Brissago in Ticino

On March 22, 1972, Schubert acquired two additional plots from a Swiss woman living in the United States, one of which adjoined the land he already owned. Since 1961, however, a federal decree (FD) had been in force governing acquisitions by foreign residents (the predecessor of the Federal Act on the Acquisition of Real Estate by Persons Abroad). Under this decree, the purchase of real estate in Switzerland was subject to authorization by the cantonal authorities, if the purchaser was domiciled abroad. On the basis of this decree, the competent Ticino authority refused to authorize the purchase.

Schubert decided to challenge the decision before the higher authority in Ticino (the Cantonal Commission for Appeals on the Acquisition of Real Estate by Persons Resident Abroad), but this Commission upheld the decision, on the grounds that the appellant had not demonstrated a sufficient legitimate interest as required by art. 6 AF of 1961.

The Austrian citizen decided to appeal the decision to the Federal Supreme Court. In his defense, he invoked a treaty with Austria-Hungary signed in 1875, in particular article 2, which stipulates the following:

"With regard to the acquisition, possession and alienation of real estate and property of all kinds, as well as the free disposal of such property and the payment of taxes and transfer duties on such real estate, the nationals of each of the contracting parties shall enjoy in the territory of the other the same rights as nationals" - art. 2 of the 1875 Treaty.

Despite its age and the break-up of Austria-Hungary, the Treaty of 1875 was still considered valid by virtue of a 1950 exchange of notes between the Swiss and Austrian governments.

=== Parties' arguments ===
The appellant claimed that there was a conflict between the 1875 Treaty and the 1961 Federal Decree. He argues that the Treaty is a special norm, while the 1961 Federal Decree is a general norm. According to the principle lex specialis derogat legi generali, the Treaty must take precedence over the Federal Decree of 1961.

At the same time, he invoked other violations of federal administrative law, but these were rejected by the Federal Court.

The Cantonal Commission and the Federal Department of Justice and Police proposed that Schubert's appeal be dismissed.

=== Ruling ===
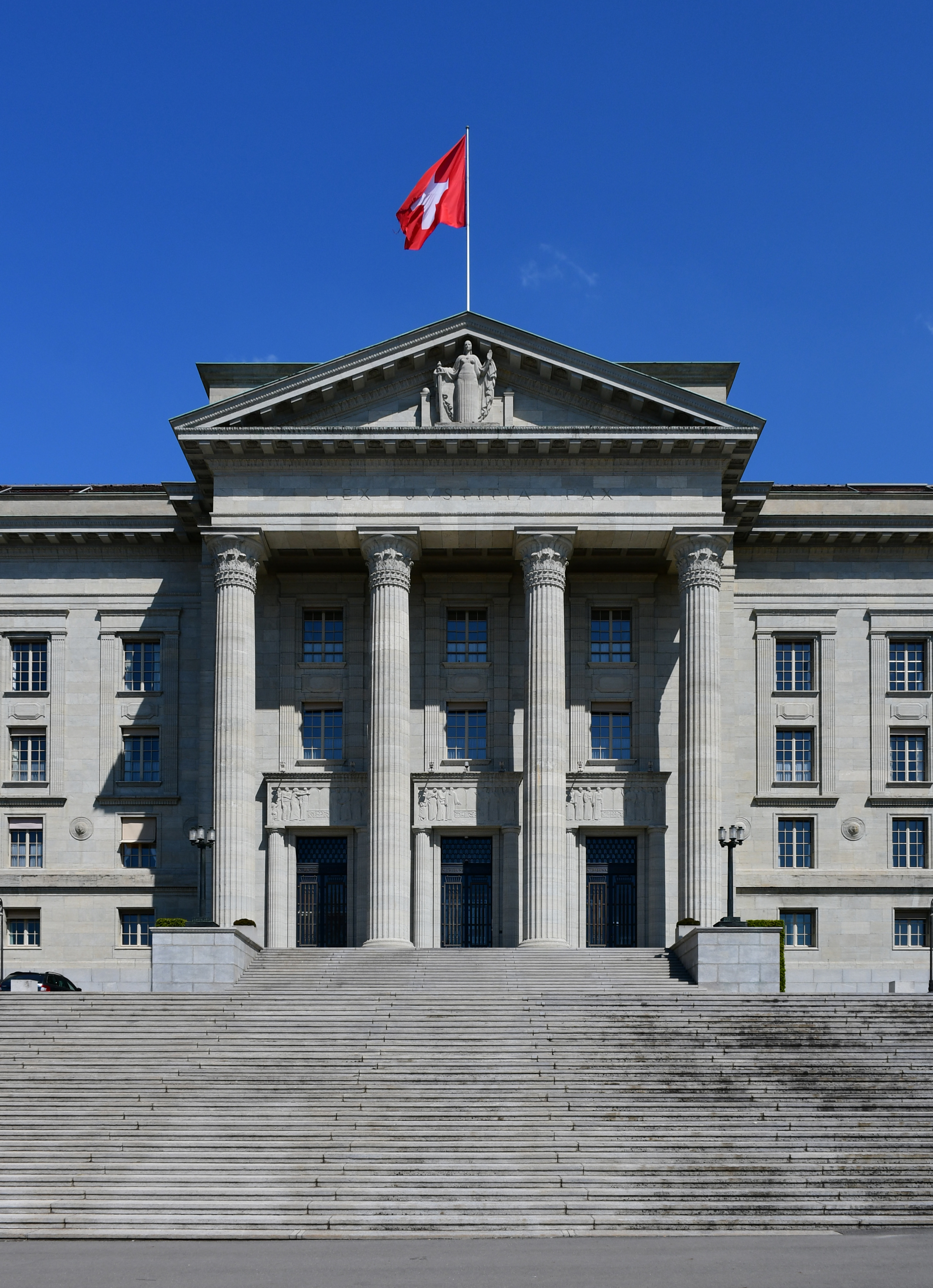
Entrance to the Federal Supreme Court, Mon-Repos Park (Lausanne)

The Federal Court begins by referring to the Frigerio ruling. According to this judgment, the federal legislator intends to uphold the validity of an international treaty binding Switzerland, as long as the same legislator does not decide to enact, consciously and voluntarily, norms of domestic law contrary to international law. However, the Court recalls that domestic law must be interpreted in a manner consistent with international law.

While referring to the legislator as the "supreme source of domestic law", the Federal Court asserts that this possibility of conscious derogation on the part of the legislator allows two things: on the one hand, to remedy certain rigidities in the interpretation of the law; on the other, to safeguard in practice interests particular to Switzerland which would be (in the eyes of Parliament) imperative. (Note: In italian: "La possibilità d'una eventuale e consapevole deroga da parte del legislatore, fonte suprema del diritto interno, consente di mitigare certi rigori e di salvaguardare in pratica determinati imperiosi interessi")

Following an analysis of the debates in the Federal Chambers, the Mon-Repos judges concluded that the Swiss legislature was fully aware of a potential breach of its international obligations in adopting the Federal Decree of 1961.

Reiterating the conclusions of the Frigerio ruling, the Federal Court applied the Federal Decree, to the detriment of the 1875 Treaty, on the basis of art. 113, paragraph 3 Cst. 1874. (Note: "The Federal Supreme Court shall apply the laws passed by the Federal Assembly [...] It shall also comply with the treaties ratified by the Federal Assembly"; this provision is taken up and rewritten in art. 190 Cst. 1999.)

=== Reception ===
The Schubert ruling has been widely criticized in the academic literature, "almost as often criticized as cited". The judgment is described as "notoriously unclear", "questionable", not to say "unconvincing", endowed with "inconsistencies", "once again creating legal uncertainty", "leaving a bad feeling after [its] reading". It is considered by some authors to be "the most controversial judgment on the question of the primacy of international law". Sassòli speaks in support of the practice, but describes it as confusing ("verwirrend"). Andreas Auer sees it as a sword of Damocles.

According to some authors, the Schubert ruling only addresses the question of the rank of international law in the Swiss legal order, not its validity or applicability, even if de facto the application of international norms is affected. In this line of thought, the ruling in no way affects the primacy of international law in the eyes of international law itself.

Some scholars consider the criteria laid down in the Schubert ruling to be restrictive, or to be applicable only in very rare cases (thereby diminishing its practical scope).

According to Baumann, it is unclear to what extent the ruling and its jurisprudence apply to customary international law. He considers that neither jurisprudence (in general), doctrine, or practice differentiates between treaty law, customary law, and general principles of law. Taking the formulation of Art. 190 Cst. (Note: "The Federal Supreme Court and other authorities are obliged to apply federal laws and international law.") as a basis, it is possible to assert that Schubert's practice also applies to customary law, as it is encompassed by the notion of "international law". However, Baumann argues that there is a difference between treaty law (which may be the subject of Schubert case law) and customary law. Customary law can only be changed by inter-state practice ("Staatenpraxis"), not by the courts of a single state.

The Federal Council and the Federal Administration took note of the decision while asserting that "it is not up to the judge [i.e. the Federal Court] to censure the legislator [i.e. the Federal Assembly] when the latter has accepted to assume the consequences of a deliberate violation of international law". The changeover to the 1999 Federal Constitution did nothing to alter this jurisprudence. In 2010, the Federal Council saw a certain parallel with American law and its relationship with international law.

Kälin draws a comparison with George Orwell's Animal Farm, asserting that federal laws are, in the eyes of the Federal Court, more equal than international treaties (echoing the famous passage "All animals are equal, but some animals are more equal than others"). Wildhaber sees the Federal Court as having a hot potato in its hands, looking to get rid of it as quickly as possible.

=== Legal and diplomatic repercussions ===
This approach had its consequences for Switzerland. It entailed the risk of finding itself in violation of a provision of international law, which could lead to the denunciation of the text concerned.

One immediate consequence was evident in 1975: Austria tried to find a solution with the Swiss Confederation to remedy the situation but without success. As a result, Austria informed Switzerland in May that art. 2 of the 1875 Treaty (guaranteeing equal treatment) was no longer applied by Vienna, due to a lack of reciprocity guarantees from Bern.

As early as 1989, the Federal Administration recognized that Switzerland's credibility on the international stage would be jeopardized if the Federal Court confined itself "to affirming the principle of the primacy of international law only when the latter does not [...] pose any problem [for Switzerland]". Moreover, in 2010, the Federal Council reiterated that Switzerland could be held liable if the Schubert ruling were applied in a future case.

== Judicial practice ==
=== Continuation ===
The Federal Supreme Court has confirmed its practice in the Schubert case on several occasions. This was the case in 1986, 1991 and 1992, ignoring the doctrinal debate that began in 1973.

However, the FC has mentioned and reaffirmed, in obiter dicta, the primacy of international law over domestic law, without mentioning the Schubert ruling, notably in 1996, where it states as follows:

"The principle of the primacy of international law over domestic law derives from the very nature of the international law, which is hierarchically superior to any domestic law norm, so that the lex posterior argument is inapplicable." - ATF 122 II 485 of November 1st, 1996, consid. 3a p. 355.

The 1996 decision, commented on by Astrid Epiney, is identified as dissociating itself from the Schubert jurisprudence, "to the surprise of the reader".

=== PKK ruling ===
==== Proceedings ====
Kurdish Workers' Party (PKK) flag

In 1997, the Federal Office for Customs and Border Security - FOCBS (German Bundesamt für Zoll und Grenzsicherheit, BAZG; French Office fédéral de la douane et de la sécurité des frontières, OFDF; Italian Ufficio Federale della dogana e della sicurezza dei confini, UDSC) seized propaganda material from the Kurdistan Workers' Party (PKK) in Riehen, a municipality in the canton of Basel-Stadt on the border with Germany. The Federal Prosecutor's Office subsequently opened a criminal investigation for violation of Article 1 of the Federal Council Decree on Subversive Propaganda (German: Bundesratsbeschluss vom 29. Dezember 1948 betreffend staatsgefährliches Propagandamaterial, Italian: DCF del 29 dicembre 1948 concernente il materiale di propaganda sovversiva, French: ACF du 29 décembre 1948 visant la propagande subversive). Having appealed against the proceedings, the claimants brought an action before the Federal Court alleging a violation of article 6 of the European Convention on Human Rights (ECHR), namely the right to a fair trial.

In its recitals, the First Court of Public Law addresses the conflict between Swiss domestic law and Article 6 ECHR. As a preliminary point, the Federal Court reaffirms that international law is binding on all state bodies, and that a domestic standard that violates international law cannot be applied. In other words, the administration and the courts must comply with international law and cannot refuse to apply it (a manifestation of monism). This non-application of domestic law (in favor of international law) is particularly appropriate if it serves the protection of human rights, (Note: In german: "Dies hat zur Folge, dass eine völkerrechtswidrige Norm des Landesrechts im Einzelfall nicht angewendet werden kann. Diese Konfliktregelung drängt sich umso mehr auf, wenn sich der Vorrang aus einer völkerrechtlichen Norm ableitet, die dem Schutz der Menschenrechte dient") relativizing in the next sentence the principle set out in Schubert.

The Federal Court therefore considers that a federal law enacted after the entry into force of an international human rights instrument binding on Switzerland (such as the ECHR) cannot be applied if it violates human rights. This practice has been confirmed and reinforced by successive rulings of the Swiss Federal Court, in 2002, 2010 and again in 2018, rendering the Schubert rule inoperative in the field of human rights.

==== Reception ====
Some authors criticize the lack of clarity in the PKK ruling, arguing that the Federal Court is hiding its true intentions. One possibility, according to Baumann and the Federal Administration, is that the Federal Court wanted to carry out a kind of preventive control in order to avoid a condemnation by the ECtHR. Indeed, if the ECtHR established a violation of the convention by Switzerland, the latter is obliged to comply with the ruling handed down by Strasbourg (seat of the ECHR) and to take measures to put an end to the violation. In addition, some authors accuse the Federal Court of deriving the primacy of international law from a text concerning human rights, and not from the (more general and internationally recognized) principle of pacta sunt servanda (these authors find the dogmatic justification unconvincing).

In terms of human rights in Switzerland, some authors criticize this ruling for creating two categories of human rights: one containing rights protected by the ECtHR and by the Federal Constitution (and therefore benefiting from the PKK ruling), the other containing rights only guaranteed by the Federal Constitution (not benefiting from the PKK ruling and subject to derogation by federal law).

While recognizing its significance on paper, other authors still question the practical significance of the PKK ruling, as it is rarely invoked by Mon-Repos (the seat of the Federal Supreme Court).

The Federal Council considered the PKK ruling to be the "exception to the Schubert exception". On the other hand, it agreed with a number of legal scholars on the practical scope of the ruling. In fact, it considered that few rulings after 1997, invoking the PKK ruling, gave precedence to an international treaty over a contrary federal law.

=== 2007 ruling concerning the Agreement on the Free Movement of Persons ===
In another ruling in 2007, the Federal Supreme Court claimed, again in obiter dictum, that the Agreement on the Free Movement of Persons (AFMP; German: Abkommen zwischen der Schweizerischen Eidgenossenschaft einerseits und der Europäischen Gemeinschaft und ihren Mitgliedstaaten andererseits über die Freizügigkeit, Italian: Accordo tra la Confederazione Svizzera, da una parte, e la Comunità europea ed i suoi Stati membri, dall’altra, sulla libera circolazione delle persone, French: Accord entre la Confédération suisse, d’une part, et la Communauté européenne et ses États membres, d’autre part, sur la libre circulation des personnes), ratified by Switzerland in a "consultazione popolare" ("popular consultation" in Italian), enjoyed democratic legitimacy, affirming their primacy in the face of a conflicting norm of domestic law. This conclusion was rejected by legal scholars, who held that the criterion of democratic legitimacy was equally applicable to laws adopted by referendum, since federal laws enacted by the Federal Assembly can also be submitted to the people for approval, if 50,000 signatures are collected within 100 days of publication of the law in the Federal Gazette (known as "optional referendum").

However, in the same ruling, the First Court of Social Law identified certain human rights provisions in the AFMP (including the principle of non-discrimination laid down in art. 9, para. 3, of its Annex 3), and therefore qualified for an extension of the scope of the PKK ruling. This case law was subsequently confirmed in 2015, in a ruling by the Second Court of Public Law, considered by some authors to be "highly controversial". The Federal Administrative Court seemed to want to confirm this jurisprudence in a 2018 ruling, while an appeal against the latter ruling was pending before the FC, which was still the case in July 2020.

=== Further relativization and possible abandonment ===
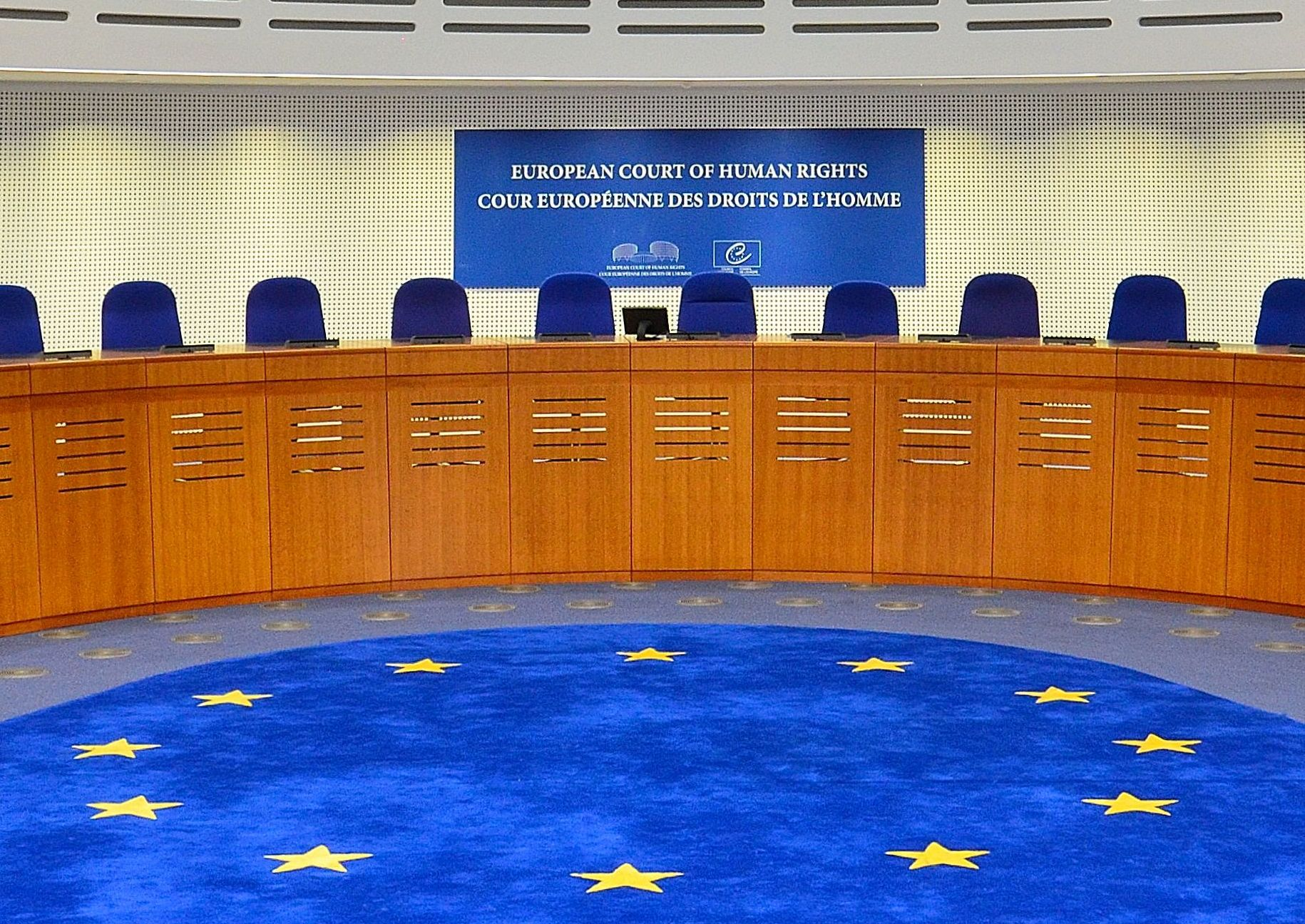
The courtroom of the European Court of Human Rights (ECtHR) in Strasbourg, responsible for enforcing the European Convention on Human Rights (ECHR)

In the same year, 2010, the Swiss Federal Supreme Court was uncertain as to the validity of the Schubert ruling.

In a first ruling (by the Second Civil Law Court) concerning a provision of the Civil Code and the ECHR, Mon-Repos attempted to overturn its decision based on the principle of the PKK ruling and apply the Schubert ruling once again to the field of human rights.

In a second decision (handed down the following day by the Second Court of Public Law), the Federal Court (re)confirms the PKK ruling and extends the primacy of Swiss law to all international law containing fundamental rights. To justify this extension, the Federal Court refers to a 1996 ruling (i.e. three years before the PKK ruling) in connection with a criminal extradition request. However, the FC inserts the phrase "in principle" into the wording of this second ruling, which, according to some commentators, leaves the door open to new exceptions. This does not prevent some authors from asserting that this hesitation is to the detriment of legal certainty.

One possible reason for this hesitation may be a conflict between the civilists and publicists who populate the Federal Supreme Court as regards the role and expansive jurisprudence of the ECtHR, with the former calling for more "self-restraint" on the part of the Strasbourg judges compared with the latter.

However, these two 2010 rulings are not mentioned in the Federal Council's report on the relationship between international and domestic law, published in the Federal Gazette (German: Bundesblatt, BBl; Italian: Foglio federale, FF; French: Feuille fédérale, FF) a few months after the publication of the said rulings.

Following the adoption of the popular initiative "For the expulsion of criminal foreigners" in 2010 (German: Eidgenössische Volksinitiative 'für die Ausschaffung krimineller Ausländer', Italian: Iniziativa popolare 'per l'espulsione degli stranieri che commettono reati', French: Initiative populaire fédérale 'Pour le renvoi des étrangers criminals'), the Federal Supreme Court was once again confronted with a conflict between national and international law (in this case, once again with the ECHR).

In an October 2012 ruling, it was confronted with the new constitutional article 121 al. 3-6 Cst. 1999, (Note: In essence, this constitutional amendment provides for perpetrators of certain criminal offences to be automatically deprived of a residence permit, expelled from Swiss territory and/or banned from entering the country.) which is in contradiction with international law, constituting a new situation (as the Schubert jurisprudence only deals with the conflict between federal law and international law).

After recalling the Schubert and PKK rulings (which only concerned federal laws, not the Constitution), the Federal Court stated: "Consequently, a federal law which is contrary to international law remains in principle inapplicable". (Note: In german: "Entsprechend bleibt eine dem Völkerrecht entgegenstehende Bundesgesetzgebung regelmässig unanwendbar") Some authors see this as a signal that the Schubert jurisprudence belongs to the past, while others cannot affirm its abandonment with the 2012 ruling. Such an abandonment requires, in the view of some, "a formal reversal confirmed by other subsequent judgments".

Part of the doctrine criticized the Federal Supreme Court for these developments in the 2010s, accusing it of being inconsistent in its practice and slow to take a clear position. Andreas Auer urged the doctrine to continue demanding an end to the practice.

At the end of 2019, the Federal Supreme Court refused to comment on the topicality of the Schubert jurisprudence. In 2020, in two rulings - the first in January, the second in July - the Federal Supreme Court mentioned this case law once again, but did not apply it to individual cases.

== As a political issue ==
The Schubert case has had a certain impact on parliamentarians and politicians skeptical of the primacy of international law or the power of international tribunals such as the ECtHR.

=== 1996 constitutional draft debate ===
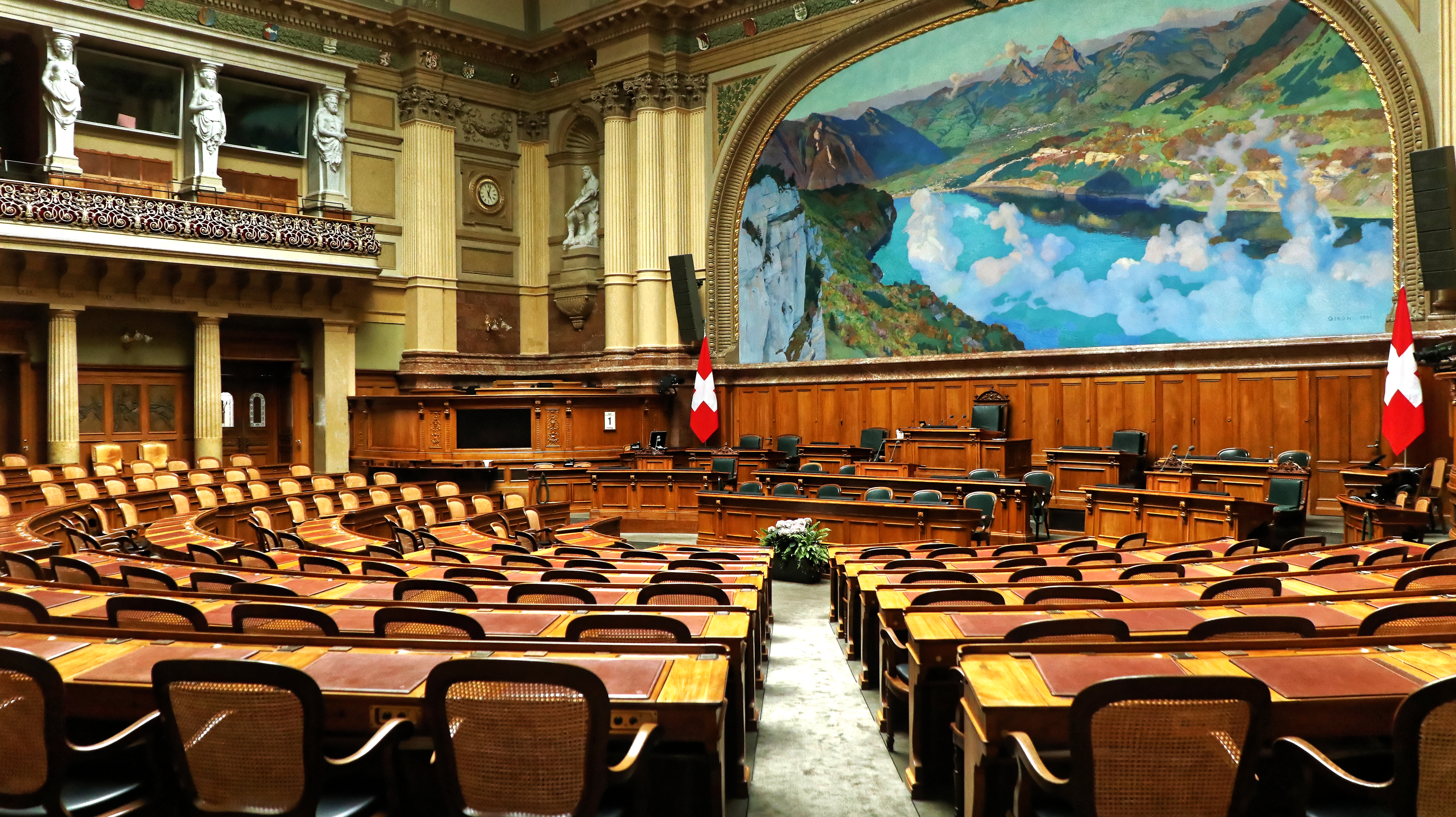
The National Council Chamber

In its message on the total revision of the Federal Constitution in 1996, the Federal Council mentioned the Schubert jurisprudence: once in the context of art. 4 para. 1 of the draft (P-Cst.; now included in art. 5 para. 4 Cst. 1999) and a second time in the context of "maintaining the primacy of international treaties" and the conflict between federal law and international law (without commenting on the jurisprudence). During parliamentary debates on the P-Cst, the Federal Chambers addressed this issue several times.

Case law remains an important key to understanding the relationship between Swiss and international law. In the Swiss system of direct democracy, conflicts between the popular will and obligations arising from international treaties and principles are possible; in this regard, the Schubert mechanism is often seen as a solution.

=== Parliamentary motions submitted by the SVP ===
As the scope of case law has narrowed, several members of the Swiss parliament have sought to enshrine Schubert in law or the constitution. In 2008, for example, St. Gallen agrarian national councillor Lukas Reimann proposed creating a "constitutional basis for Schubert practice". In its response, the Federal Council emphasized that the authors of the 1999 Constitution had deliberately chosen not to take a position, so as to enshrine the principle of the primacy of international law, while leaving open the possibility of a few exceptions. The motion was rejected by the National Council in 2010.

Reimann reiterated his motion in 2016, particularly in view of the ruling on the deportation of foreign criminals: he was told that the codification of the Schubert practice, which was too rigid, presented dangers for the implementation of international law. Here again, the National Council refused to follow up in 2017.

In 2009, the SVP group also attempted to enshrine in the Constitution the idea that "when there is a contradiction between an old international treaty or other norm of international law and a new federal law, the Federal Tribunal must adhere to the latter". The National Council's Political Institutions Committee (CIP-N) responded that the flexibility of the jurisprudential solution was better suited to case-by-case solutions. In 2010, the National Council decided not to proceed.

In 2013, Luzi Stamm, an agrarian national councillor from Grisons, proposed the primacy of domestic law, along with a codification of the Schubert practice. In particular, he proposed that the Federal Court should systematically apply an international treaty only if it had been subject to a referendum. This parliamentary initiative was rejected by the National Council, which refused to act on it in 2014.

The controversy culminated in the debate on the popular initiative on "foreign judges" (German: Selbstbestimmungsinitiative, Italian: Iniziativa per l’autodeterminazione, French: Initiative populaire fédérale suisse pour l'autodétermination). The idea of "reviving Schubert" was raised in the Federal Assembly, which discussed a possible counter-proposal, but the project was once again rejected, not least to protect Switzerland's credibility on the international stage.

== Bibliography ==
=== Doctrine ===
- ^{(de + fr)} Andreas Auer, "Ungereimtes im schweizerischen Verfassungsrecht - Incongruités constitutionnelles helvétiques", Revue de droit suisse (RDS), vol. I, 2013, p. 419-435 (ISSN 0084-540X).
- ^{(de)} Robert Baumann, "The scope of the Schubert practice", Pratique Juridique Actuelle (PJA), vol. 16, no 8, 2010, p. 1009-1019 (ISSN 1660-3362).
- ^{(fr)} Samantha Besson, Droit international public : Abrégé de cours et résumés de jurisprudence, Fribourg, Stämpfli, 2019, 4th ed. (1st ed. 2013), 530 p. (ISBN 978-3-7272-1560-5).
- ^{(fr)} Lucius Caflisch, "La pratique suisse en matière de droit international public 2011", Revue suisse de droit international et européen, April 2013 (read online archive [PDF]).
- ^{(de)} Thomas Cottier et Serge Pannatier, "Treaties of State", Schweizerische Juristische Kartothek, Genève, no 385, November 1995.
- ^{(de)} Astrid Epiney, "Bundesgericht, I. öffentlichrechtliche Abteilung, 1.11.1996, p. c. Bundesamt für Polizeiwesen (1A.263/1996), Verwaltungsgerichtsbeschwerde", Pratique Juridique Actuelle (PJA), 1997, p. 350-353 (ISSN 1660-3362).
- ^{(de)} Astrid Epiney, "The relationship between international law and national law from the perspective of the Federal Supreme Court : comment on the BGE 2C_828/2011 of October 12th 2012", Jusletter, March 18, 2013 (ISSN 1424-7410.
- ^{(fr)} André Grisel et Jean Monnier, "A propos de la hiérarchie des normes juridiques", Schweizerisches Zentralblatt für Staats- und Verwaltungsrecht (ZBl), vol. 88, 1987, p. 377-395 (ISSN 1422-0709).
- ^{(de)} Yvo Hangartner, "End or continuation of the Schubert practice?", Pratique Juridique Actuelle (PJA), vol. 3, no 5, 1997, p. 634-635 (ISSN 1660-3362).
- ^{(de)} Yvo Hangartner, "Das Verhältnis von Völkerrecht und Landesrecht", Revue Suisse de Jurisprudence (RSJ), vol. 94, 1998, p. 201-208 (ISSN 0036-7613).
- ^{(de)} Yvo Hangartner, "Bundesgerichtlicher Positionbezug zum Verhältnis von Bundesverfassung und Völkerrecht", Pratique Juridique Actuelle (PJA), vol. 22, no 5, 2013, p. 698-707 (ISSN 1660-3362).
- ^{(de)} Walter Kälin, "Schubert and the rule of law or: are federal laws more authoritative than state treaties?", Revue de droit suisse (RDS), vol. 112, no 1, 1997, p. 73-77 (ISSN 0254-945X).
- ^{(fr)} Guillaume Lammers, La démocratie directe et le droit international : Prise en compte des obligations internationales de la Confédération et participation populaire à la politique extérieure (doctoral thesis), Berne, Stämpfli, coll. "Etudes de droit suisse" (no 810), 2015, 405 p. (ISBN 978-3-7272-0348-0).
- ^{(fr)} Denis Masmejan, Démocratie directe contre droit international, Lausanne, Presses polytechniques et universitaires romandes, coll. "Savoir suisse", 2017, 160 p. (ISBN 978-2-88915-231-5).
- ^{(de)} Marco Sassòli, "Völkerrecht und Landesrecht : Plädoyer eines Völkerrechtlers für Schubert", in François Bellanger and Jacques de Werra (dir.), Genève au confluent du droit interne et du droit international : Mélanges offerts par la Faculté de droit de l'Université de Genève à la Société suisse des juristes à l'occasion du congrès 2012, Zurich, Schulthess, 2012, 227 p. (ISBN 978-3-7255-6620-4), p. 185-201.
- ^{(de)} Felix Schöbi, "The Schubert Practice of the Federal Supreme Court in the Light of the Parliamentary Discussion on the Agreement on the European Economic Area", Pratique Juridique Actuelle (PJA), vol. 1, no 7, 1993, p. 887-893 (ISSN 1660-3362).
- ^{(de)} Stefan Schürer, "Has the PKK jurisprudence relativized the Schubert practice?", Schweizerisches Zentralblatt für Staats- und Verwaltungsrecht, vol. 116, no 3, 2015, p. 115-132 (ISSN 1422-0709).
- ^{(de)} Luzius Wildhaber, "Remarks on the Schubert case concerning the relationship between international law and national law", Schweizerisches Jahrbuch für internationales Recht, 1974, p. 195-201 (ISSN 0251-2947).

=== Messages and reports from the Federal Council ===
- ^{(fr)} "La relation entre droit international et droit interne : Rapport du Conseil fédéral du 5 mars 2010 en réponse au postulat 07.3764 de la Commission des affaires juridiques du Conseil des Etats du 16 octobre 2007 et au postulat 08.3765 de la Commission des institutions politiques du Conseil national du 20 novembre 2008", Feuille fédérale, no 13, April 7, 2010, p. 2067-2144 (read online archive [PDF]).
- ^{(fr)} "Rapport additionnel du 30 mars 2011 du Conseil fédéral au rapport du 5 mars 2010 sur la relation entre droit international et droit interne", Feuille fédérale, no 7, April 27, 2011, p. 3401-3448 (read online archive [PDF]).
- ^{(fr)} "Message du 5 juillet 2017 relatif à l’initiative populaire «Le droit suisse au lieu de juges étrangers (initiative pour l’autodétermination)", Feuille fédérale, no 32, August 15, 2017, p. 5027-5078 (read online archive [PDF]).

=== Other administrative documents ===
- ^{(de + fr)} Office fédéral de la justice (OFJ), "Publication commune de l’Office fédéral de la justice et de la Direction du droit international public : Rapports entre le droit international et le droit interne au sein de l'ordre juridique suisse. Fondements juridiques et conséquences de la primauté du droit international", Jurisprudence des autorités administratives de la Confédération (JAAC), vol. 53, no 54, April 26, 1989, p. 1-32 (German), p. 32-79 (French) (ISSN 1420-2417, read online archive [PDF]).

== Appendix ==
=== Legal basis ===
- European Convention on Human Rights (ECHR) of November 4, 1950 (status February 23, 2012), RS 0.101.
- Traité entre la Confédération suisse et la Monarchie austro-hongroise, concernant l'établissement, l'exemption du service et des impôts militaires, l'égalité des ressortissants des deux Etats en matière d'impôts, leur traitement gratuit réciproque en cas de maladie et d'accidents et la communication gratuite réciproque d'extraits officiels des registres des naissances, des mariages et des décès archive of December 7, 1875 (status May 9, 1975), RS 0.142.111.631.
- Accord entre la Confédération suisse, d'une part, et la Communauté européenne et ses Etats membres, d'autre part, sur la libre circulation des personnes archive (ALCP) of June 21, 1999 (status January 1, 2019), RS 0.142.112.681.
- Federal Constitution of the Swiss Confederation archive (Cst. 1874) of May 29, 1874 (status February 7, 1999), ex RS 101 (this constitution is no longer in force, replaced by the Cst. 1999).
- Federal Constitution of the Swiss Confederation archive (Cst. 1999) of April 18, 1999 (status January 1, 2020), RS 101.
- Arrêté fédéral instituant le régime de l'autorisation pour l'acquisition d'immeubles par des personnes domicilées à l'étranger archive (AF de 1961) of March 23, 1961 (status January 1, 1971), RS 211.412.41., original deutsch version archive published in RO 1961 209 (this decree is no longer in force, substituted by the Lex Koller).

=== Decisions of the Swiss Federal Supreme Court ===
- ^{(fr)} ATF 35 I 467 ("Spengler") of June 10, 1909 read online archive.
- ^{(fr)} ATF 59 II 331 ("Steenworden") of July 17, 1933 read online archive.
- ^{(de)} ATF 76 IV 43 ("Lang") of January 27, 1950 read online archive.
- ^{(de)} ATF 94 I 669 ("Frigerio") of November 22, 1968 read online archive.
- ^{(it)} ATF 99 Ib 39 ("Schubert") of March 2, 1973 read online archive.
- ^{(de)} ATF 125 II 417 ("PKK") of July 26, 1999 read online archive.
- ^{(de)} ATF 139 I 16 ("Removal initiative") of October 12, 2012 read online archive.

=== Related articles ===
- International law and the principle pacta sunt servanda
- Law of Switzerland
- Swiss Federal Constitution
- Federal act (Switzerland)
- fr:Jurisprudence des semoules, similar jurisprudence in French law.
