= Judicial review in Sweden =

Judicial review in Sweden (Swedish: lagprövningsrätt) is a constitutional provision, by which any Swedish court or administrative authority can declare an Act of the Parliament of Sweden to be in violation of the Constitution or a Government Ordinance to be in violation of laws passed by the Riksdag and thus inapplicable in the concrete case. Since 1994, the Constitution has stipulated that no law or other regulation may violate the European Convention (Ch. 2, art. 19 of the Instrument of Government). Traditionally, a more important check on the ability of the Riksdag to pass laws in violation of the rights provided by the Constitution has been the judicial preview exercised by the Council on Legislation. The preview may or may not be respected by the legislator.

== See also ==
- Judicial review
