= Plaintiff S157/2002 v Commonwealth =

2003 Australian High Court case

- Court: High Court of Australia
- Full case name: Plaintiff S157 /2002 v Commonwealth of Australia
- Decided: 4 February 2003
- Citations: [2003] HCA 2, (2003) 211 CLR 476

Court membership
- Judges sitting: Gleeson CJ, Gaudron, McHugh, Gummow, Kirby, Hayne and Callinan JJ

Case opinions
- (7:0) The privative clauses were valid, but did not affect the availability of constitutional writs (per Gaudron, McHugh, Gummow, Kirby and Hayne, Gleeson CJ and Callinan J concurring)

Plaintiff S157/2002 v Commonwealth, also known as 'S157', is a decision of the High Court of Australia.

It is an important case in Australian Administrative Law, in particular for its holdings about Parliament's inability to restrict the availability of constitutional writs.

As of September 2020, 'S157' is the 12th most cited case of the High Court.

== Background ==
The plaintiff, (Note: The effect of the Migration Legislation Amendment Act (No. 6) 2001 (Cth) is that courts cannot name plaintiffs seeking protection visas in order to reduce the potential that the publication the applicants name may create further protection claims for people in Australia or put their families and colleagues overseas at risk of harm: "Explanatory Memorandum".) wished to challenge a decision of the Refugee Review Tribunal denying him a protection visa. Two sections of the Migration Act 1958 (Cth) denied him the right to appeal the decision. The plaintiff applied to the High Court, arguing that the relevant sections did not apply to applications for relief under s75(v) of the Constitution. s474 purported to make certain decisions ("privative clause decisions") final and unreviewable, stating that such decisions are "not subject to prohibition, mandamus, injunction, declaration or certiorari in any court on any account". S486A placed time limits on applications to the High Court in respect of these decisions.

The plaintiff argued that s474 was directly inconsistent with s75(v) and therefore invalid.

The privative clause was based on that considered in R v Hickman, with Philip Ruddock, the Minister for Immigration, stating:

Members may be aware that the effect of a privative clause such as that used in Hickman's case is to expand the legal validity of the acts done and the decisions made by decision-makers. The result is to give decision makers wider lawful operation for their decisions, and this means that the grounds on which those decisions can be challenged in the Federal and High Courts are narrower than currently.

== Decision ==
The Hickman principle was, the majority held, simply a rule of construction allowing apparently incompatible statutory provisions to be reconciled.

Two rules of construction relating to privative clauses were held to exist:

1. "if there is an opposition between the Constitution and any such provision, it should be resolved by adopting [an] interpretation [consistent with the Constitution if] that is fairly open." (per Hickman); and
2. Privative clauses are construed strictly.

Applying these principles led to the conclusion that although the two sections were valid, they did not apply to the plaintiff's action in the High Court because the section did not extend to decisions affected by jurisdictional error. Gaudron, McHugh, Gummow, Kirby and Hayne JJ said:

104. The reservation to this Court by the Constitution of the jurisdiction in all matters in which the named constitutional writs or an injunction are sought against an officer of the Commonwealth is a means of assuring to all people affected that officers of the Commonwealth obey the law and neither exceed nor neglect any jurisdiction which the law confers on them. The centrality, and protective purpose, of the jurisdiction of this Court in that regard places significant barriers in the way of legislative attempts (by privative clauses or otherwise) to impair judicial review of administrative action.
