= Pacta sunt servanda =

Latin legal phrase

Pacta sunt servanda ("agreements must be kept") is a brocard and a fundamental principle of law which holds that treaties or contracts are binding upon the parties that entered into the treaty or contract. It is customary international law. According to Hans Wehberg, a professor of international law, "few rules for the ordering of Society have such a deep moral and religious influence" as this principle.

In its most common sense, the principle refers to private contracts and prescribes that the provisions, i.e. clauses, of a contract are law between the parties to the contract, and therefore implies that neglect of their respective obligations is a violation of the contract. The first known expression of the brocard is in the writings of the canonist Cardinal Hostiensis from the 13th century AD, which were published in the 16th.

== History of the brocard ==
According to tradition, the brocard origins can be traced back to Cicero's De Legibus in its full form:

"Pacta sunt servanda pietate" which can be translated as "Let vows be piously performed."

== Modern jurisprudence ==
In both civil law and common law jurisdictions, the principle is related to the general principle of correct behavior in commerce, including the assumption of good faith. While most jurisdictions in the world have some form of good faith within their legal systems, there exists debate as to how good faith should be evaluated and measured. For example, in the United States—a common law jurisdiction—the implied duty of good faith and fair dealing exists in all commercial contracts.

== International law ==
Under international law, "every treaty in force is binding upon the parties to it and must be performed by them in good faith." This entitles states party to the Vienna Convention on the Law of Treaties (signed 23 May 1969 and entered into force on 27 January 1980) to require that obligations instituted by treaties be honored and to rely on such obligations being honored. This basis of good faith for treaties implies that a party to a treaty cannot invoke provisions of its municipal (domestic) law as justification for negligence of its obligations pursuant to the treaty in question.

The only limits to application of pacta sunt servanda are the peremptory norms of general international law, which are denominated "jus cogens", i.e. compelling law. The legal principle of clausula rebus sic stantibus in customary international law also permits non-satisfaction of obligations pursuant to treaty because of a compelling change of circumstances.

== See also ==
- International law
- Natural law
- Clausula rebus sic stantibus
- Customary international law
- Breach of contract
- Breach of the peace
- Schubert Jurisprudence
- Efficient breach of contract
- Fundamental breach
- Hugo Grotius
- List of Latin phrases
- List of legal Latin terms
