= Lex Koller =

Swiss law limiting the acquisition of real estate by persons abroad

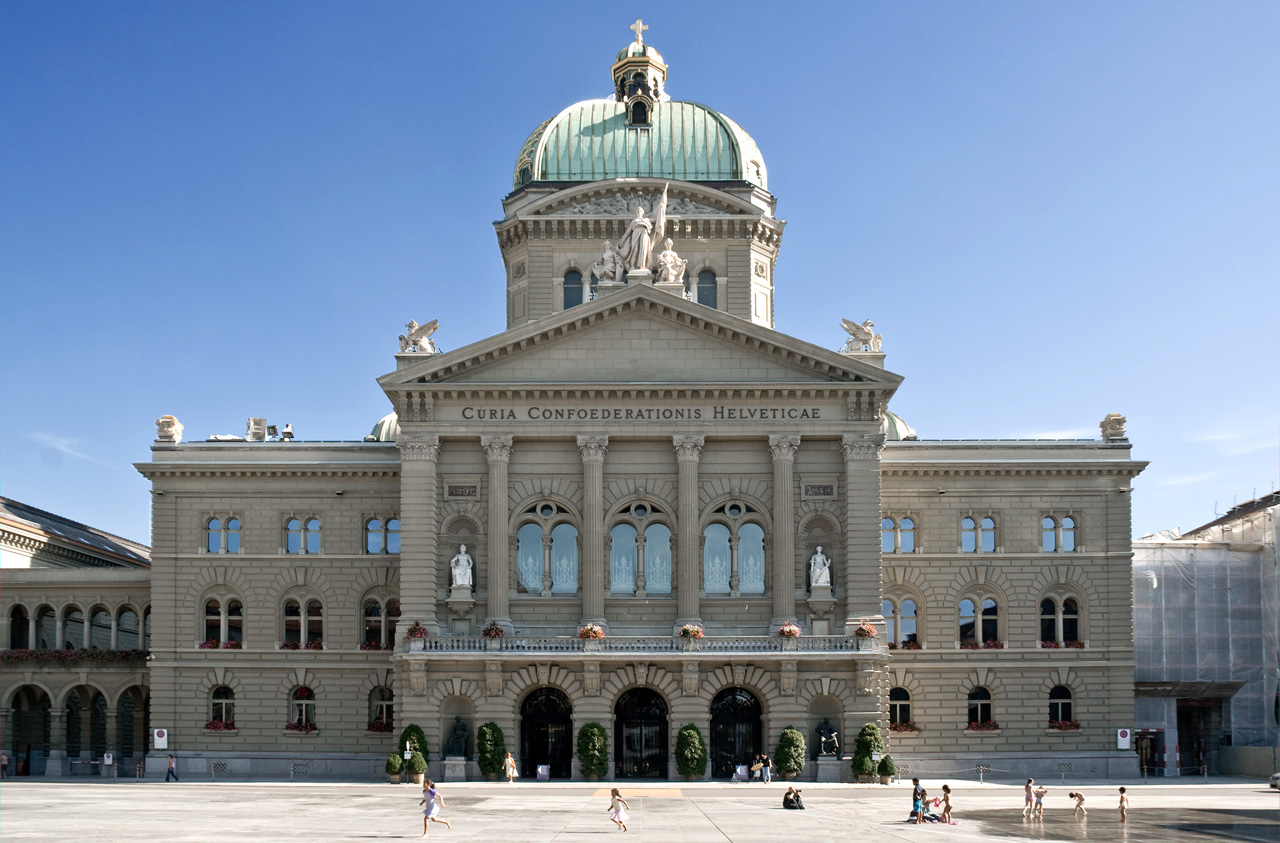

Federal Assembly of Switzerland
- Long title: Federal Act on Acquisition of Real Estate by Persons Abroad (SR 211.412.41)
- Territorial extent: Switzerland
- Enacted by: Federal Assembly of Switzerland
- Enacted: 16 December 1983
- Commenced: 1 January 1985

Repeals
- Federal Decree establishing the system of authorization for the acquisition of real estate by persons domiciled abroad (23 March 1961)
- Status: Current legislation

The Federal Act on Acquisition of Real Estate by Persons Abroad (Note: German: Bundesgesetz über den Erwerb von Grundstücken durch Personen im Ausland, BewG; French: Loi fédérale sur l'acquisition d'immeubles par des personnes à l'étranger, LFAIE; Italian: Legge federale sull’acquisto di fondi da parte di persone all’estero, LAFE) was adopted on December 16, 1983, by the Federal Assembly and came into force on January 1, 1985. This Swiss federal law, also known as the Lex Koller, limits the acquisition of real estate by persons abroad. It succeeded the Lex Friedrich and was extensively amended in 1997 to take the name of Federal Councillor Arnold Koller, then head of the Federal Department of Justice and Police.

The 1961 Federal Decree that this law replaced is the source of the famous Schubert jurisprudence.

The objective being to "prevent foreign influence on Swiss soil", any acquisition of real estate by a person domiciled abroad is subject to an administrative authorization, the conditions for which are exhaustively listed in the law and its implementing provisions. Without such authorization, the legal act is null and void and the transfer cannot be entered in the land register.

It is the authority designated by the canton that decides on the question of whether a legal act is subject to the authorization system and on the granting of the authorization.

== Persons abroad as defined by the law ==
Persons abroad are defined as any person domiciled abroad who is not a Swiss national as well as any person actually domiciled in Switzerland who is not an EU/EFTA national but who does not hold a valid settlement permit (C permit).

The question of domicile is fundamental. According to Swiss law, domicile is only established at the place where a person:

- resides with the intention of settling there permanently,
- is the center of his or her existence and personal relations,
- lives regularly in his free time,
- has family and friends and
- takes part in a social life.

Thus, a foreigner who wishes to acquire a property in Switzerland and who claims to be effectively domiciled there must prove it, if necessary by taking into account other elements than just the cantonal residence permit and the municipal certificate of arrival.
