= Judicial supervision (Soviet Union) =

Soviet legal system for review of court actions

In the law of the Soviet Union, judicial supervision (Russian: судебный надзор) was a system for review of court sentences, orders, and decrees that have entered into legal force. It was regulated by the Article 48 of the Basic Principles of Criminal Legislation of the USSR and the Union Republics. A review under this system could be carried out only upon the request of a procurator, the chairman of a court, or deputy chairman to whom this right was assigned by legislation.

It is distinguished from cassation.

Judicial supervision was carried out by the bodies of Supreme Courts of the Union Republics, and in a limited number of situations by the Supreme Court of the Soviet Union.

William Partlett argues that this practice, historically grounded in the legal practice of the Russian Empire, was "justified as a way of ensuring a centralised vertical of power for Party policy" and enforced legality by reviewing the administrative and judicial decisions. This practice was re-used in legal systems of other communist states.

A lower-level of supervision to ensure legality was the prosecutorial supervision.

== See also ==
- Judicial review
