= Jurisdictional fact =

Legal concept in administrative law

Jurisdictional fact are facts which must objectively exist before a statutory power can be exercised by a decision-maker. They are created by and operate in the context of government authority produced by statute and are linked to the legal concept of jurisdiction. A number of scholars have tried, with limited success, to categorise them.

== United Kingdom ==
In the United Kingdom, the seminal definition is the English law case of Anisminic.

Some countries, like Singapore, India and Canada that have written constitutions, can be constrained in their definition of "jurisdictional facts" and due to the restraints in their constitutions.

== Australia ==
In Australia the High Court has been reticent to define jurisdictional facts finding that "The principles as to how one determines whether something is a jurisdictional fact are settled but necessarily imprecise. That must be so." and that "to define Jurisdictional fact is neither necessary nor desirable." Despite this, Australian courts have made efforts to define the concept of jurisdictional fact, including the following:

- "A condition of jurisdiction".
- "A preliminary question on the answer to which … jurisdiction depends".
- An "event or requirement" constituting "an essential condition of the existence of jurisdiction". ...."a condition of jurisdiction", without which a tribunal can not act.
- But the leading definition in Australia is the "criterion, satisfaction of which enlivens the power of the decision-maker" found in Enfield.

These criteria of jurisdiction are created by and operate through statute, and may be subjective, or objective in nature and may also be a complex of interactions. but they must not be illogical, or capricious and must be actual.

== Singapore ==
In Singapore the concept is called "precedent fact errors".

== See also ==
- Jurisdictional error
