= Judicial review in Malaysia =

Although Malaysia inherited the political system of British India based on the Westminster system, which made no provision for judicial review, the Federal Constitution of Malaysia instituted a system based on that of India which was in turn influenced by other constitutions including that of the United States. Judges are empowered to declare laws or executive actions ultra vires if they clashed with the Constitution and/or the parent legislation. However, this power was curbed after the 1988 Malaysian constitutional crisis by then Prime Minister Mahathir Mohamad through amendments to the Federal Constitution. A particularly significant amendment was the removal of the judicial power and subjecting the judiciary to such jurisdiction and powers as may be conferred by or under federal law. The merits of detentions made under the Internal Security Act are also not subject to judicial review, but the procedures are.
