= Judicial review in Switzerland =

Article 190 of the Swiss Federal Constitution states that federal statutes and international law are binding on the Swiss Federal Supreme Court. In consequence, the courts are not empowered to review the constitutionality of federal statutes, but will, where possible, construe statutes so as not to create a conflict with the Constitution. The courts can suspend the application of federal statutes that conflict with international law, but tend to exercise this power cautiously and deferentially: In Schubert (BGE 99 Ib 39), the Federal Supreme Court refused to do so because Parliament had consciously violated international law in drafting the statute at issue.

The reason traditionally given for the lack of judicial review is the Swiss system of popular democracy: If 50,000 citizens so demand, any new statute is made subject to a popular referendum. In this sense, it is the people themselves that exercise review.

The situation described above for Swiss federal law applies mutatis mutandis to the constitutional and legal systems of the individual cantons. However, owing to the derogatory power of federal law, federal courts as a matter of course exercise judicial review on cantonal law, as well as on federal executive law (ordinances, executive orders etc.).
