= Jurisdictional error =

Legal concept in administrative law

Jurisdictional error is a concept in administrative law, particularly in the UK and Australia. Jurisdiction is the "authority to decide", and a jurisdictional error occurs when the extent of that authority is misconceived. Decisions affected by jurisdictional error can be quashed by judicial review. Examples of jurisdictional errors include asking a wrong question, ignoring relevant material, relying on irrelevant material, and breaching natural justice.

== Australia ==
In Australia, the definition of jurisdictional error can be found in High Court judgements.

Hayne J has defined jurisdictional error in the following terms:

The difficulty of drawing a bright line between jurisdictional error and error in the exercise of jurisdiction should not be permitted, however, to obscure the difference that is illustrated by considering clear cases of each species of error. There is a jurisdictional error if the decision maker makes a decision outside the limits of the functions and powers conferred on him or her, or does something which he or she lacks power to do. By contrast, incorrectly deciding something which the decision maker is authorised to decide is an error within jurisdiction.

A more specific definition of Jurisdictional error is defined as follows:

Jurisdictional error is at its most obvious where the inferior court purports to act wholly or partly outside the general area of its jurisdiction in the sense of entertaining a matter or making a decision or order of a kind which wholly or partly lies outside the theoretical limits of its functions and powers.

The power of superior courts to respond to jurisdictional error by issuing the prerogative writs is entrenched in Australia's constitution:

[T]he jurisdiction of this Court to grant relief under s 75(v) of the Constitution cannot be removed by or under a law made by the Parliament. Specifically, the jurisdiction to grant s 75(v) relief where there has been jurisdictional error by an officer of the Commonwealth cannot be removed.

However, the term has been subject to criticism. In 2008, Kirby J held:

The classification is conclusory. It is very difficult to define and to apply. In recent years it has been substantially discarded by English legal doctrine. Jurisdictional error is nearly impossible to explain to lay people even though the Constitution (including the central provisions in s 75(v)) belongs to them. Most non-lawyers would regard it as a lawyer's fancy.

=== Types ===
Mark Aronson identifies eight categories of jurisdictional error:

- A mistaken assertion or denial of the very existence of jurisdiction
- A misapprehension or disregard of the nature or limits of the decision-maker's functions or powers
- Acting wholly or partly outside the general area of the decision-maker's jurisdiction, by entertaining issues or making the types of decisions or order which are forbidden under any circumstances. An example is a civil court trying a criminal charge.
- Mistakes as to the existence of a jurisdictional fact or other requirement when the relevant act treats that fact or requirement as something which must exist objectively as a condition precedent to the validity of the challenged decision.
- Disregarding relevant considerations or paying regard to irrelevant considerations, if the proper construction of the relevant act is that such errors result in invalidity.
- Errors of law, although where the decision-maker is an inferior court or other legally qualified adjudicative body, the error will probably have to be such that it amounts to a misconception of the nature of the function being performed or of the body's powers.
- Acting in bad faith
- Breaching the hearing or bias rules of natural justice

This list is non-exhaustive, as these grounds lead to invalidity and therefore jurisdictional error.

Jurisdictional error is a separate ground of review under the ADJR Act, sought on the ground "that the person who purported to make the decision did not have jurisdiction to make the decision". The nine statutory grounds of review provided for in s 5 of the ADJR Act overlap substantially with the concept of jurisdictional error at common law. Jurisdictional error can "be seen to embrace a number of different kinds of errors" administered in an administrative tribunal. As such, the circumstances of a particular case may permit more than one characterisation."

== Canada ==
Canadian administrative law has a similar set of concepts called substantive review which incorporates most of the criteria of jurisdictional error.

== Singapore ==
In Singapore they are known as "precedent fact errors" but work effectively like the United Kingdom jurisprudence.

== Hong Kong ==
Judicial review in Hong Kong is effectively the English system and is enshrined in Article 35 of the constitution.

== United Kingdom ==
In the UK, the House of Lords has held they are "... an incorrect interpretation of a statutory phrase by the ... authorities [that] amounted to an error of law that was judicially reviewable".

As with Canada, judicial review in Scotland does not use the term but holds many of the concepts in their judicial review system.

=== Grounds ===
In the CCSU Case, Lord Diplock suggests that the grounds can be reduced to three or four broad concepts – illegality, irrationality, procedural impropriety and proportionality.

== Other countries ==
The term jurisdictional error is not used in:

- Malaysia
- New Zealand
- United States of America
