= Dinsdale v R =

Judgement of the High Court of Australia

- Court: High Court of Australia
- Full case name: Dinsdale v The Queen
- Decided: 7 September 2000
- Citations: [2000] HCA 54, 202 CLR 321

Court membership
- Judges sitting: Gleeson, Gaudron, Gummow, Kirby, and Hayne JJ

Case opinions
- appeal allowed The suspended sentence imposed by the trial judge was not manifestly inadequate Gleeson CJ & Hayne JJ; Gaudron & Gummow JJ; Kirby J

Dinsdale v R is an Australian legal case decided in the High Court.

It is notable in Australian criminal law as an authority on suspended sentences, the discretion of appellate courts to overturn sentences imposed by lower courts, and the nature of crown criminal appeals.

The facts of the case involved a man indicted in Western Australia's District Court on two counts relating to the sexual abuse of a child under 13 years.

According to LawCite, it is the 33rd most cited case of the High Court.

== Facts ==
Pictured: The Coat of Arms of Western Australia. Dinsdale had been sentenced under the Sentencing Act 1995 (WA)

Christin Robert Dinsdale had been indicted in the District Court of one count of sexual penetration of a child under 13 years, and one count of indecently dealing with that child. Both offences were alleged to have occurred on the same date and place. He pleaded not guilty, but was convicted on both counts. The trial judge, Justice Viol, sentenced him to concurrent terms of suspended imprisonment, each of 18 months length.

The Court of Criminal Appeal allowed the prosecution appeal, and set aside the sentence imposed by the trial judge on the offence of sexual penetration. They ordered that the appellant be sentenced to 30 months imprisonment. The order for suspension was set aside.

Dinsdale then appealled to the High Court.

== Judgement ==
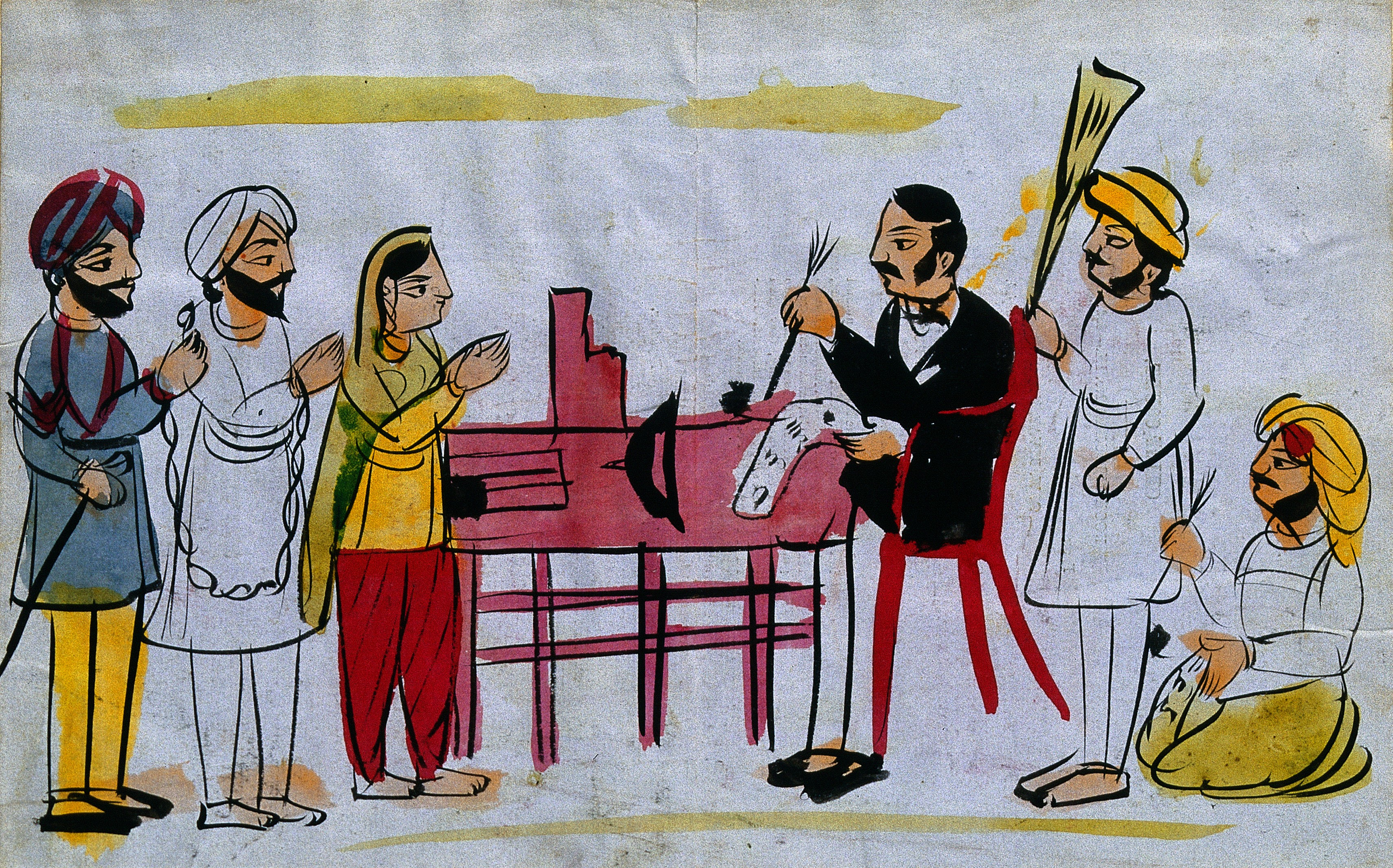
Depicted: a courtroom scene of a judge imposing a sentence upon two offenders

The High Court unanimously upheld Dinsdale's appeal. It found that the trial judge's sentence was not manifestly inadequate, and that the Court of Appeal ought not have interfered. Kirby J additionally found that the Court of Appeal had considered too narrow a set of factors in deciding not to impose a suspended sentence. He found that the appellate court had only considered Dinsdale's prospects for rehabilitation, and preferred the trial judge's more wholistic view of factors relevant to that decision. (Note: The trial judge's approach, which was preferred by Kirby took into account: "all the circumstances and information available, including the nature of the particular offence, the low likelihood of the appellant's reoffending, and the impact which a prison sentence, immediately served, would have on the appellant and his family." 202 CLR 321, at para [88]) (Note: Gaudron & Gummow JJ concurred with Kirby's reasons on this point)

== Significance ==
Dinsdale has been cited many times for its comments about written reasons in the event of an appellate court finding manifest error in criminal sentencing. Gleeson CJ & Hayne JJ wrote:

"Manifest inadequacy of sentence, like manifest excess, is a conclusion. A sentence is, or is not, unreasonable or plainly unjust; inadequacy or excess is, or is not, plainly apparent. It is a conclusion which does not depend upon attribution of identified specific error in the reasoning of the sentencing judge and which frequently does not admit of amplification except by stating the respect in which the sentence is inadequate or excessive. It may be inadequate or excessive because the wrong type of sentence has been imposed (for example, custodial rather than non‑custodial) or because the sentence imposed is manifestly too long or too short. But to identify the type of error amounts to no more than a statement of the conclusion that has been reached. It is not a statement of reasons for arriving at the conclusion. A Court of Criminal Appeal is not obliged to employ any particular verbal formula so long as the substance of its conclusions and its reasons is made plain. The degree of elaboration that is appropriate or possible will vary from case to case."

The case has also been numerously cited for Kirby J's comments regarding crown criminal appeals. He wrote:

"For reasons of legal history and policy, the position of Crown appeals against sentence has long been regarded, in Australia and elsewhere, as being in a class somewhat different from that of an appeal against sentence by a convicted offender. When first introduced, Crown appeals were considered to cut across "time-honoured concepts" of the administration of criminal justice in common law legal systems. For this reason, it has sometimes been said that, as a "matter of principle", such appeals should be a comparative rarity. The attitude of restraint reflected in such remarks has often been justified on the basis that a Crown appeal against sentence puts the prisoner in jeopardy of punishment for a second time, a feature that is ordinarily missing from an appeal, or application for leave to appeal, brought by those who have been sentenced. The consequence is that where the Crown appeals, it is normally obliged to demonstrate very clearly the error of which it complains. The further consequence is that, where such demonstration succeeds, it is conventional for the appellate court to impose a substituted sentence towards the lower end of the range of available sentences. This convention tends to add an additional restraint upon interference, given the strong resistance that exists against appellate "tinkering" with sentences."

The case is additionally known for the proposition that rehabilitation of an offender is not the only relevant factor when deciding to impose a suspended sentence. Other factors, such as the objective gravity of the offending, may also be relevant.

== See also ==
- House v R
- Veen v R (No 2)
