= Minister for Immigration and Ethnic Affairs v Wu Shan Liang =

Judgement of the High Court of Australia

MIEA v Wu Shan Liang
- Court: High Court of Australia
- Full case name: Minister for Immigration and Ethnic Affairs v Wu Shan Liang, Huang Chang Jiang and Liu Jun Liang
- Decided: 1996
- Citation: 185 CLR 259

Court membership
- Judges sitting: Brennan CJ, Toohey, McHugh, Gummow, and Kirby JJ

Case opinions
- Appeal allowed Brennan CJ, Toohey, McHugh, & Gummow JJ; Kirby J

MIEA v Wu Shan Liang is a decision of the High Court of Australia.

It is an important case in Australian Administrative Law, particularly for the court's discussion of the 'proper role of a reviewing court' when examining decisions made by the executive.

According to LawCite, Guo has been cited the fourth most times of any High Court decision.

== Facts ==
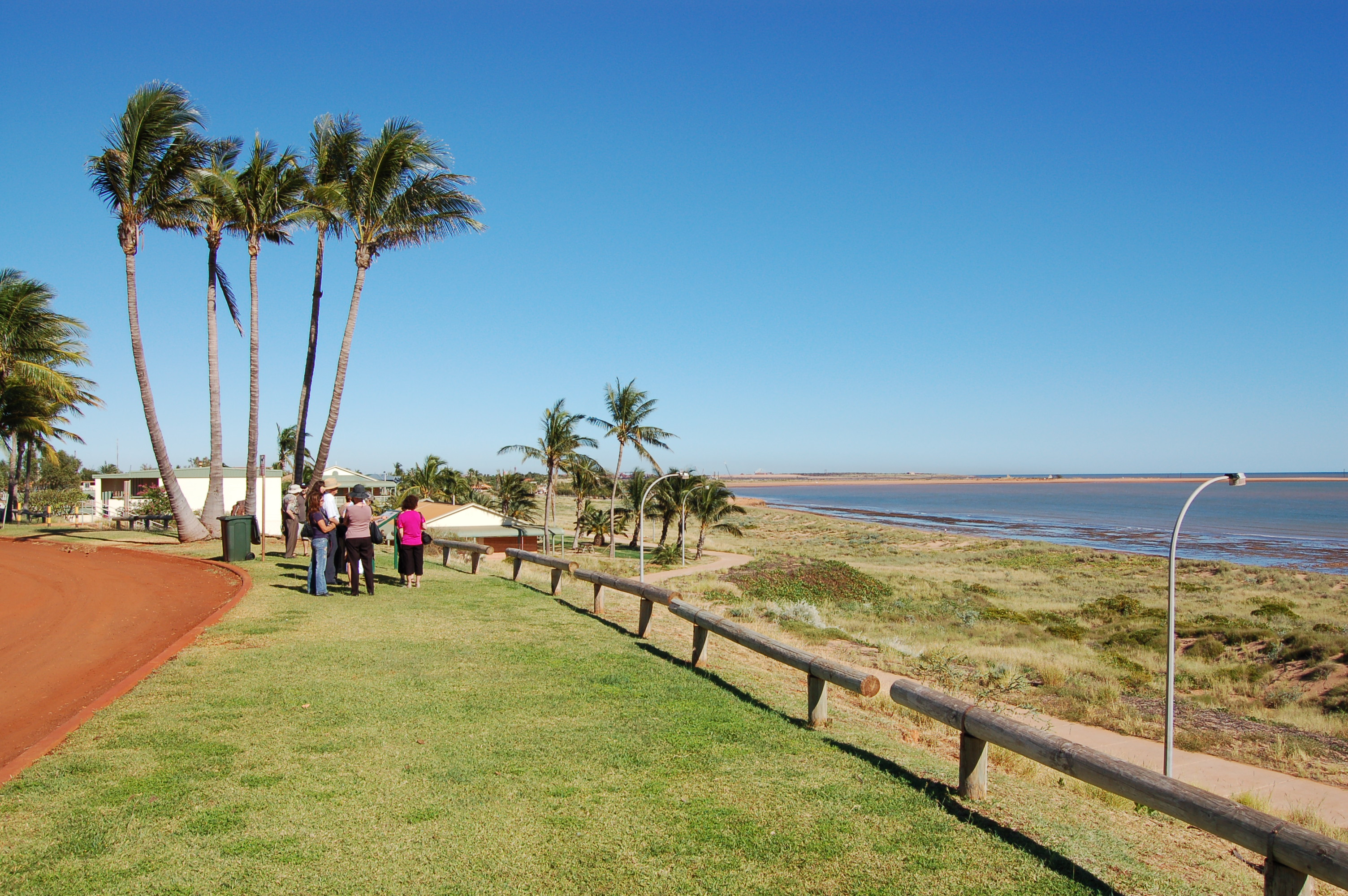
a photograph at Port Hedland, the town in which the respondents to the appeal were detained

Wu Shan Liang and the other respondents to the appeal were nationals of the People's Republic of China. They had arrived by boat at Christmas Island in 1992 in a group of 68 Chinese nationals. All of the group were detained in Port Hedland. Some of the group were granted refugee visas, others abandoned their claims and returned to China.

Some of the nationals persisted in their claims. Their claims for refugee status were rejected by ministerial delegate. They then appealed to the Federal Court. Wilcox J rejected their appeals, finding that error had not been shown on the part of any of the delegates involved in the respondent's cases.

On appeal to the Full Federal Court, Sheppard, Lee and Carr JJ sided for the visa applicants; finding that the delegates had applied the wrong legal test. After analyzing the delegate's written reasons about the applicants having a 'well founded fear of persecution', they concluded that the delegate had incorrectly applied the 'balance of probabilities' test; instead of the 'real chance' test. (Note: Chan v Minister for Immigration & Ethnic Affairs established that the 'real chance' test is to be applied when determining whether or not a refugee applicant has a well-founded fear of persecution)

The Minister then obtained special leave at the High Court.

== Judgement ==
The High Court overturned the Full Federal Court, finding that the delegate had not misapplied the 'real chance' test. While the delegate had used some language in their decisions suggesting the balance of probabilities test had been applied, it was clear from other areas of their reasons that they were aware of the correct test that ought to have been applied.

Additional comment was made on the principle of 'beneficial construction' when reviewing written reasons of the executive. The High Court endorsed prior commentary on the issue by a lower court which had held that; 'The reasons for the decision under review are not to be construed minutely and finely with an eye keenly attuned to the perception of error.'

The court additionally commented upon the difference between merits review and judicial review, writing:

'These propositions are well settled. They recognise the reality that the reasons of an administrative decision-maker are meant to inform and not to be scrutinised upon over-zealous judicial review by seeking to discern whether some inadequacy may be gleaned from the way in which the reasons are expressed. In the present context, any court reviewing a decision upon refugee status must beware of turning a review of the reasons of the decision-maker upon proper principles into a reconsideration of the merits of the decision. This has been made clear many times in this Court.

For example, it was said by Brennan J in Attorney-General (NSW) v Quin:

"The duty and jurisdiction of the court to review administrative action do not go beyond the declaration and enforcing of the law which determines the limits and governs the exercise of the repository's power. If, in so doing, the court avoids administrative injustice or error, so be it; but the court has no jurisdiction simply to cure administrative injustice or error. The merits of administrative action, to the extent that they can be distinguished from legality, are for the repository of the relevant power and, subject to political control, for the repository alone.'

After concluding that the delegate had applied the correct legal test in assessing the respondent's refugee claims; the High Court found for the Minister.

== See also ==
- Chan Yee Kin v Minister for Immigration & Ethnic Affairs
- House v The King
- Briginshaw v Briginshaw
