= Applicant S v MIMA =

Judgement of the High Court of Australia

- Court: High Court of Australia
- Full case name: Applicant S v Minister for Immigration and Multicultural Affairs
- Decided: 27 May 2004
- Citation: 217 CLR 387

Court membership
- Judges sitting: Gleeson CJ, McHugh, Gummow, Kirby, and Callinan JJ

Case opinions
- Appeal allowed The tribunal failed to consider whether young able-bodied men comprised a social group that could be distinguished from the rest of Afghan society Gleeson CJ, Gummow and Kirby J concurring McHugh J dissenting Callinan J

Applicant S v MIMA is a decision of the High Court of Australia.

The case is an important decision in Australian refugee law. It is particularly known for its holdings about the meaning of 'particular social group' under the Refugee Convention, and for its holdings regarding when a law of general application may be considered to give rise to discriminatory treatment.

According to LawCite, it has been cited the ninth most times of any High Court decision.

== Facts ==
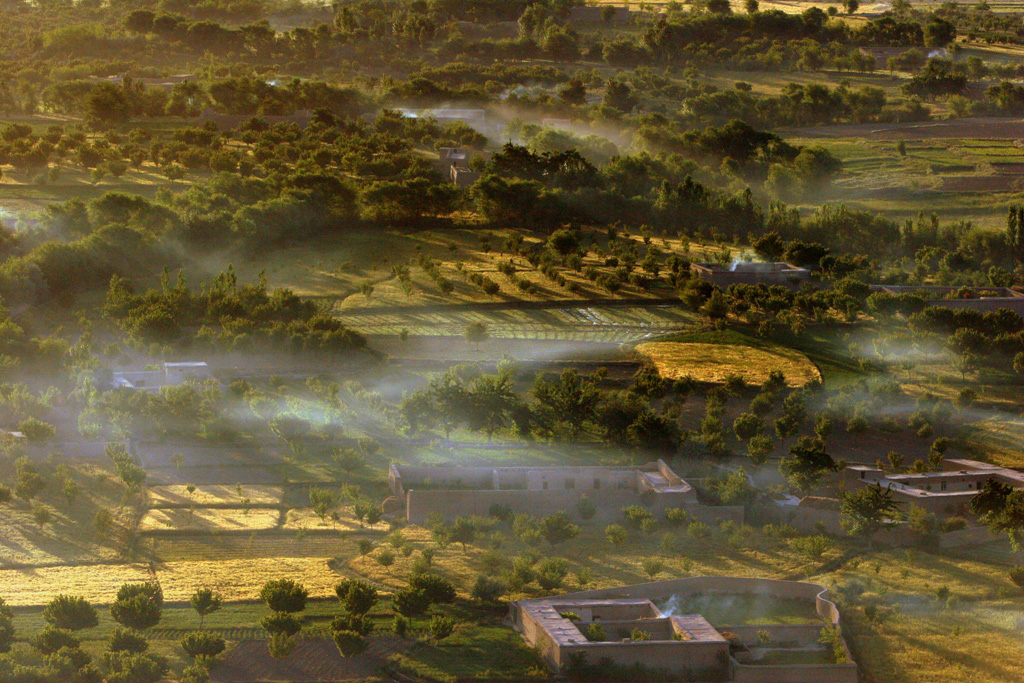
a photograph of fields in Uruzgan province, where Applicant S originated from before arriving in Australia

Applicant S was a married Afghan male of Pashtun ethnicity, from Malizo village of Gizab district in Orozgan province, Afghanistan. He arrived in Australia on 11 July 2000 by boat. On 25 July, he applied for a protection visa and was subsequently refused by ministerial delegate. He reviewed this decision, and it was affirmed by the Tribunal.

It was accepted by decision-makers that the reason Applicant S had left Afghanistan was to avoid forcible recruitment by the Taliban. However, his refugee visa application was rejected because;

'he was not targeted to the extent that he was listed or registered for recruitment by the Taliban but was merely seen as a young man who was available in that area at that time and, in the random manner of such an ad hoc drive he was able to avoid recruitment for a second time'

On appeal to the federal court, Carr J overturned the Tribunal's decision for failing to have considered whether the appellant was a member of a 'particular social group' and whether his persecution was by reason of his membership of that group. Specifically, it should have considered whether 'able-bodied young men' comprised a 'particular social group' within the meaning of the Refugee Convention.

The Full Federal Court then overturned that appeal; on the basis that no evidence existed before the Tribunal which would have supported a claim that Afghan society perceived young able-bodied men as comprising a separate group.

Applicant S then obtained special leave to appeal at the High Court. He primary ground of appeal was that while a society's perceptions of the existence of a particular social group is relevant to a finding that the group exists; it is not a requirement for the group to be held to exist.

== Judgement ==
The High Court upheld Applicant S's primary ground of appeal. The court then laid out a general framework for determining whether a group falls within the definition of 'particular social group' in Art IA(2) of the Refugee Convention; as follows:

First, the group must be identifiable by a characteristic or attribute common to all members of the group.

Secondly, the characteristic or attribute common to all members of the group cannot be the shared fear of persecution.

Thirdly, the possession of that characteristic or attribute must distinguish the group from society at large.

Borrowing the language of Dawson J in Applicant A, a group that fulfills the first two propositions, but not the third, is merely a "social group" and not a "particular social group". As this Court has repeatedly emphasized, identifying accurately the "particular social group" alleged is vital for the accurate application of the applicable law to the case in hand.

The minister additionally submitted that the Taliban conscription drive was effectively a law of general application, and therefore non-discriminatory. The High Court pointed out that while the conscription law was one of general application, it was nevertheless capable of being enforced in a discriminatory manner. The court endorsed a prior holding in Applicant A, in which McHugh J had spelled out criteria for determining when a law that results in discriminatory treatment actually amounts to persecution. He had held that;

'the question of whether the discriminatory treatment of persons of a particular race, religion, nationality or political persuasion or who are members of a particular social group constitutes persecution for that reason ultimately depends on whether that treatment is "appropriate and adapted to achieving some legitimate object of the country [concerned]"'

For various reasons, the Taliban policy of recruitment was held to have failed this legal test. Ultimately, Applicant S's appeal was upheld because:

The majority of the Full Court erred in law by requiring that there had to be evidence before the Tribunal that would support the claim that Afghan society perceived young able-bodied men as comprising a separate group. Further, however, the Tribunal failed to consider the correct issue. This was whether because of legal, social, cultural, and religious norms prevalent in Afghan society, young able-bodied men comprised a social group that could be distinguished from the rest of Afghan society. Given the correct issue was not considered, the evidence put before the Tribunal in respect of the position of young able-bodied men in Afghanistan was scant and related only to the Tribunal's finding that the Taliban appeared to be recruiting young men.

The Tribunal decision was then set aside, with the matter to be remitted to it for re-determination.

== See also ==
- Chen Shi Hai v MIMA
- MIMA v Haji Ibrahim
- MIMA v Khawar
