= Appellant S395/2002 v MIMA =

Judgement of the High Court of Australia

S395/2002 v MIMA
- Court: High Court of Australia
- Full case name: Appellant S395/2002 v Minister for Immigration and Multicultural Affairs
- Decided: 2003
- Citation: 216 CLR 473

Court membership
- Judges sitting: Gleeson CJ, McHugh, Gummow, Kirby, Hayne, Callinan and Heydon JJ

Case opinions
- appeal allowed
- Concurrence: McHugh, Kirby JJ, Gummow, Hayne JJ
- Dissent: Gleeson CJ; Callinan, Heydon JJ

Appellant S395/2002 v MIMA is a decision of the High Court of Australia.

The case is important to refugee law in Australia, especially for its elaboration upon legal principles as they apply to LGBTIQ asylum seekers.

Appellant S395 is the 21st most cited High Court case according to LawCite.

== Facts ==
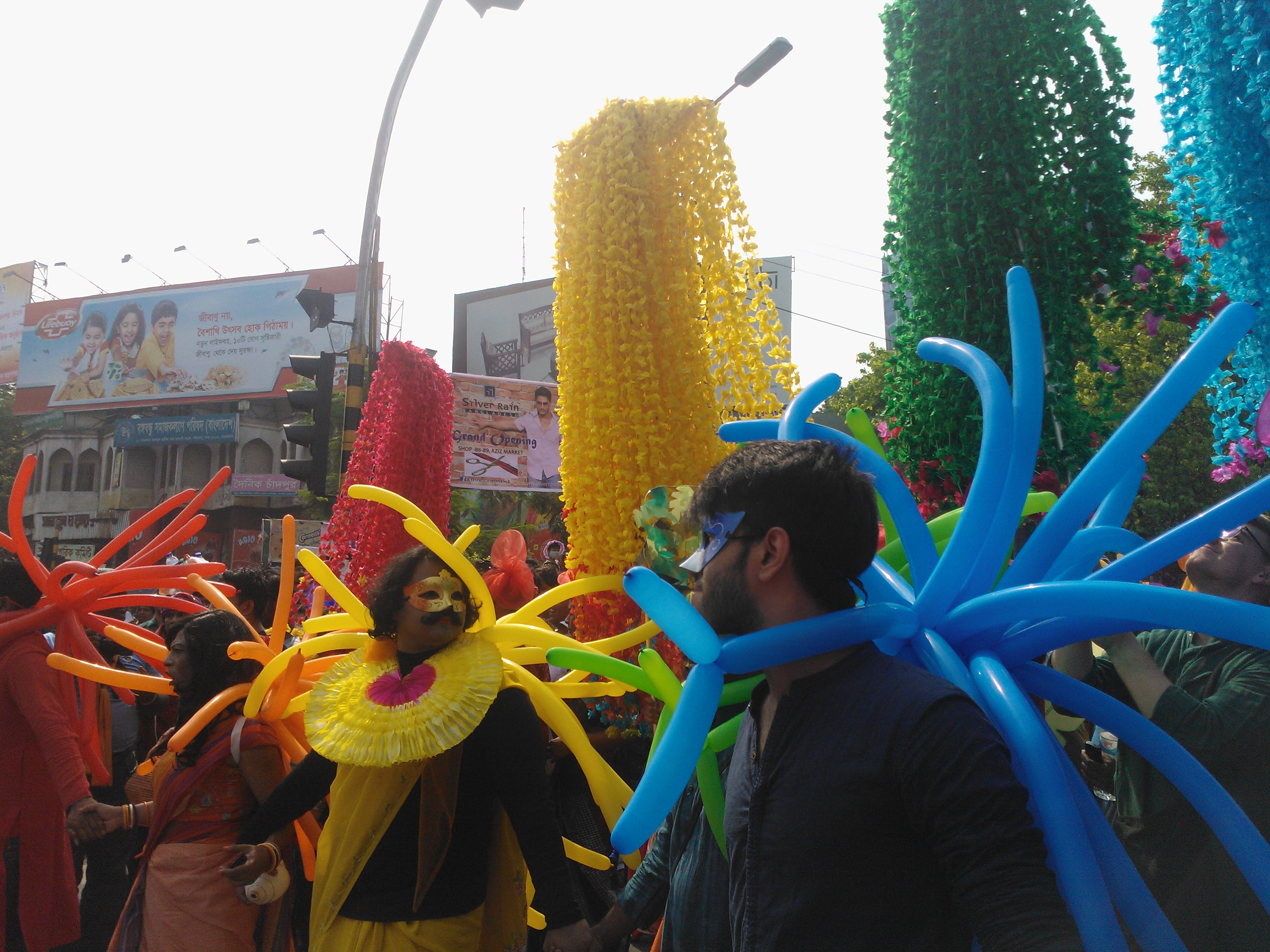
Pictured: a 2015 LGBT rights rally during the Pohela Boishakh, in Dhaka, Bangladesh

The appellants were two gay Bangladeshi men. Whilst in Australia they applied for refugee visas. They argued that they had a well-founded fear of persecution as members of a particular social group, if forced to return to Bangladesh.

A Ministerial delegate found that if the men kept their relationship a secret, they would not suffer any serious harm; and so refused them visas for having failed to take reasonable steps to avoid harm. The Tribunal affirmed this decision to refuse them protection visas. The decision was affirmed again at review before the RRT.

Appeals to the Federal Court and Full Federal Court were dismissed. They then were granted special leave to appeal at the High Court.

== Judgement ==
The High Court held by majority that the tribunal erred by splitting the social group of 'homosexual men' invalidly into two other purported social groups; discreet and non-discreet homosexual men.

It held while refugee visa applicants must take reasonable steps to avoid harm before a 'well founded fear' can be recognised; that this does not extend to a requirement that people facing discrimination be discreet about their sexuality.

The court then remitted the decision to the Tribunal.

== See also ==
- Applicant S v MIMA
- LGBT rights in Bangladesh
- List of High Court of Australia cases
- MIMA v Khawar
