= MIEA v Guo =

Judgement of the High Court of Australia

- Court: High Court of Australia
- Full case name: MINISTER FOR IMMIGRATION AND ETHNIC AFFAIRS v GUO & ANOR (Matter No S151 of 1996); MINISTER FOR IMMIGRATION AND ETHNIC AFFAIRS v PAN & ANOR (Matter No S152 of 1996)
- Decided: 1997
- Citation: 191 CLR 559

Court membership
- Judges sitting: Brennan C.J., Dawson, Toohey, Gaudron, McHugh, Gummow, and Kirby JJ

Case opinions
- Appeal allowed Brennan CJ, Dawson, Toohey, Gaudron, McHugh, & Gummow JJ; Kirby J

MIEA v Guo, also known as 'Guo', is a decision of the High Court of Australia. The case is an important decision in Australian refugee law. The case has been described as setting out 'what is required for a decision-maker to have a "rational basis" for determining whether an applicant for refugee status has a well founded fear of persecution'.

According to LawCite, Guo has been cited the eighth most times of any High Court decision.

== Facts ==
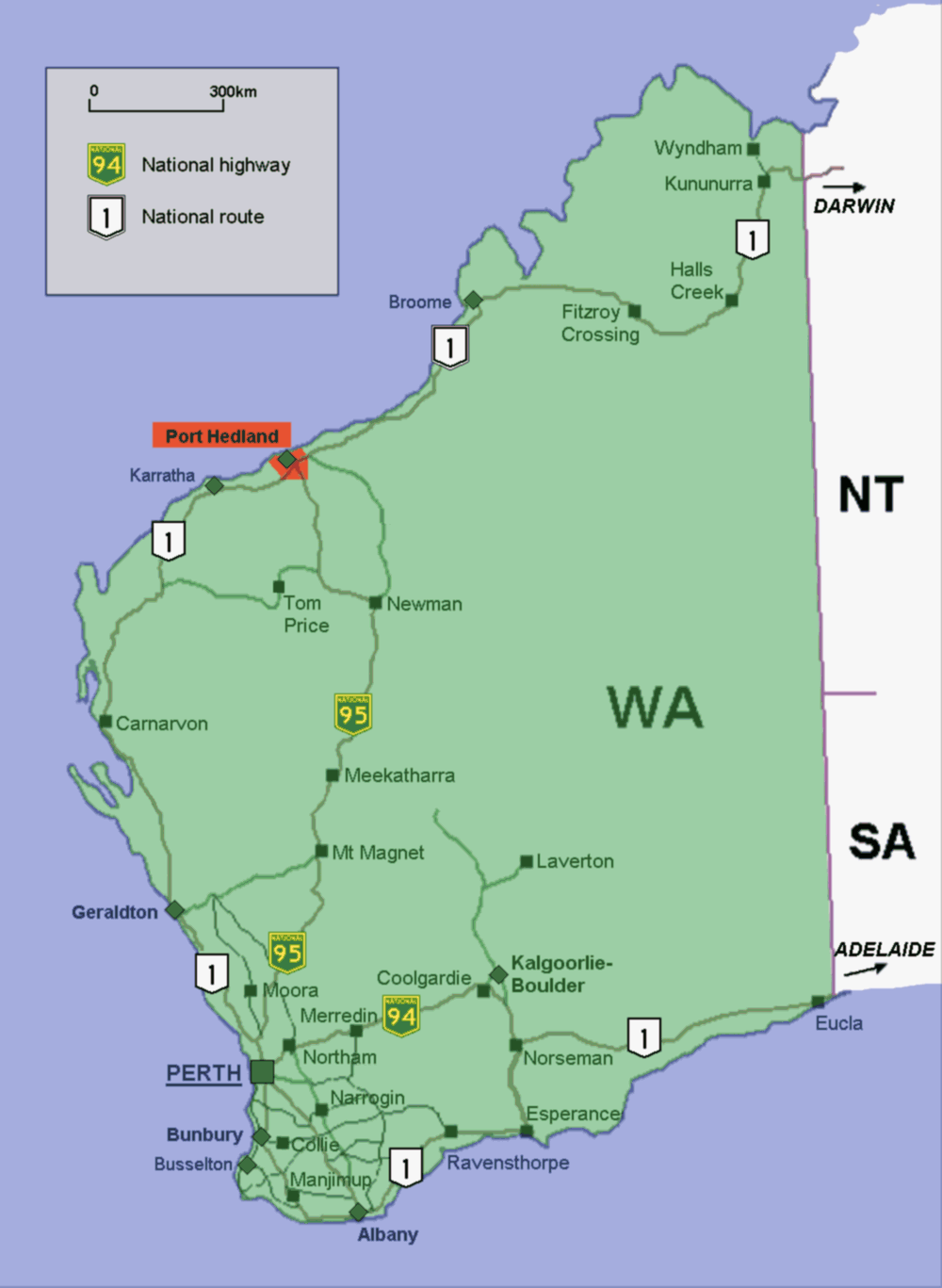
Port Hedland; the location of the detention centre in which Guo and his wife were detained

Mr Guo and his wife, Ms Pan, the appeal respondents; were citizens of China. In May 1992 they arrived by boat in Australia, after having left China without permission from the authorities. Officials from the Department of Immigration & Ethnic Affairs detained the respondents alongside other passengers on the boat in a detention center. Sometime that month an application was made by Guo for a refugee visa. A delegate refused the application on 28 May 1992. The respondents then applied for review of the delegate's decision at committee. The committee affirmed the delegate's decision, and their findings were affirmed by another delegate.

Prior to deportation Mr Guo and his brother participated in a public protest at Port Hedland. He and other protestors wore headbands marked with Chinese characters for 'hunger strike', and bore placards protesting against their treatment by the department. Three members jumped off a rooftop during the protest, including Mr Guo. Guo was identified as the protest leader in the publicity that subsequently arose.

Subsequently, Guo others were deported to the PRC. Upon their re-entry they were detained for five days. The two brothers were then detained a further 23 days and fined 3,000 RMB. Guo claimed to have been rearrested and detained for four months from 5 June 1993, however the Tribunal rejected this claim in a later application. (made seven months later, and the subject of this appeal)

On 5 December 1993 Guo and a group of relatives arrived in Broome. On 14 December the department received applications for refugee status; on the ground they had a well-founded fear of persecution of reason of political opinion. They claimed that, because they had illegally departed the PRC in 1992, and in 1993 had breached the one child policy; they would be persecuted for their political opinion. They also claimed to belong to a social group of Chinese citizens opposed to the one child policy. A delegate refused this application on 31 January 1994, and this was affirmed by Tribunal.

The Tribunal found that nothing that occurred to Guo after he was deported to the PRC in 1992, was politically motivated. It found that his detention in China had merely been a consequence of penalties for illegal departure, and not because of his political activities. Charges for illegal departure were found to be unrelated to convention grounds; as they were applied to the Chinese population in general.

Guo then sought judicial review. The Full Federal Court upheld his appeal, unanimously. Beaumont J upheld Guo's appeal, finding that the Tribunal had not considered whether political reasons could be inferred as informing the PRC authority's actions. Marcus Einfeld held that the Tribunal had erred in making findings on the balance of probabilities, undermining the real chance test established in Chan.

The Minister appealed to the High Court, in doing so making an undertaking as to costs.

== Judgement ==
The High Court unanimously held that the Tribunal had not effectively applied a balance of probabilities test. The majority discussed the four elements for a 'refugee' finding, under the convention. They found that Guo did not satisfy one of the elements; that the person must be persecuted for a 'convention reason'. Membership of a social group consisting of 'parents of one child in China' did not constitute, the court held, a 'particular social group' under the convention.

Turning to the 'well-founded fear' element of the test, the High Court criticized the Federal Court's direct application of Chan's real chance test. The court stressed that the test was a clarification of the convention's term 'well-founded', and shouldn't be used in substitution for the convention's words. They accused Einfeld J of having substituted and used the 'real chance' test exclusively; when he found the Tribunal had erred for having 'shunned speculation'

The court then turned to the FFCA's finding that the Tribunal had applied the balance of probabilities test, instead of the 'real chance' test. The High Court quoted a previous statement in Wu Shan Liang, which had said:

"When conflicting information available to the Minister's delegate relates to some past event ... the attribution of greater weight to one piece of information as against another or an opinion that one version of the facts is more probable than another is not necessarily inconsistent with the correct application of the Chan test."

Despite this, they found that courts must consider both possible outcomes within any balance of probabilities finding; to ensure that the well-founded test is what applies. I.e. 'If, for example, a Tribunal finds that it is only slightly more probable than not that an applicant has not been punished for a Convention reason, it must take into account the chance that the applicant was so punished when determining whether there is a well-founded fear of future persecution'. They found that in the case before it, the Tribunal had 'no real doubt that its findings both as to the past and future were correct'.

The Court therefore found for the Minister.

== Significance ==
Guo is a significant judgement for the legal tests that apply for refugee determinations. Its development of that jurisprudence shortly followed the High Court's previous rulings in Chan and Wu Shan Liang. Guo is frequently cited alongside those cases in judgements and Tribunal decisions which discuss the convention's determination requirements. For example, in MIMA v Rajalingam Sackville J wrote:

"... the requirement in Wu Shan Liang and Guo (is) simply an aspect of the obligation to apply correctly the principles for determining whether an applicant has a “well-founded fear of being persecuted” for a Convention reason. The reasonable speculation in which the decision-maker must engage may require him or her to take account of the chance that past events might have occurred, even though the decision-maker thinks that they probably did not."

The case has also been regarded as an authority for the proposition that 'past harm may be relevant to, but not determinative of, future persecution'.
