= Cranssen v R =

Judgement of the High Court of Australia

Cranssen v The King
- Court: High Court of Australia
- Full case name: Cranssen v The King
- Decided: 1936
- Citation: 55 CLR 509

Court membership
- Judges sitting: Starke J, Dixon J, Evatt J, McTiernan J

Case opinions
- Starke J Dixon, Evatt, McTiernan JJ

Cranssen v the King is a decision of the High Court of Australia.

The case is notable for its statements of principle that apply to sentencing discretion in Australia. For this purpose, it was most recently cited by the High Court in 2011. It is often cited alongside House v The King.

At issue was an appeal of sentence by Fr Anthony Cranssen, a Dutch Catholic priest who was convicted of arson in the Territory of New Guinea. He had been sentenced to five years imprisonment and hard labour by the Supreme Court at Rabaul. Cranssen had organised an armed group of Papuans, and instructed them to burn down huts belonging to Lutheran Papuans from outside the locality of his mission.

The case was reported on by The Otago Daily Times.

== Facts ==
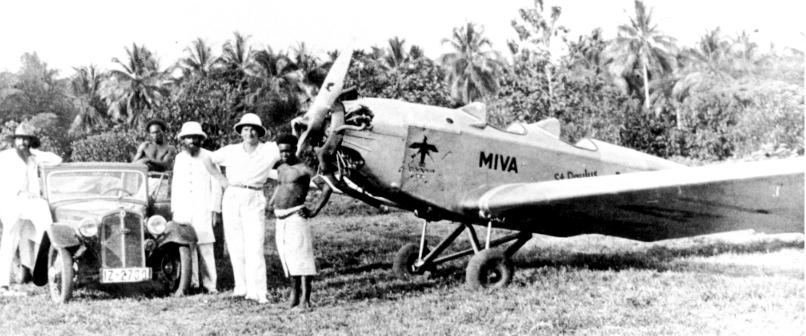
Pictured: The mission plane, the Miva which took missionaries to the highlands of New Guinea where Cranssen was based. He likely rode this plane; as it was owned and operated by his religious order.

Map of modern-day Madang province

Anthony Cranssen was an ordained Catholic priest from Holland, who had been sent by the Society of the Divine Word to a mission at Alexishafen in the Territory of New Guinea. He remained there a few months and then was sent into an uncontrolled area of the Madang district. To obtain a permit to enter that area, he was required by the territory Administrator to be accompanied by ten men; four of whom had to be capable with firearms.

He entered an area called Iwam along with two other missionaries and thirty coastal Papuan men. They established a station at a place called Guyebi. The Papuans in that area had never been contacted before by Europeans. Cranssen's fellow missionaries left the station within three months, and he remained there as the lone European from that point. He established various outstations nearby during this time.

After two years, in December 1934, another priest in charge of a mission station two hours distance from his location was killed by local Papuans. He embarked for that station, and there met other missionaries. They were all attacked at that time, but made their way back to safety. In January 1935 another missionary, a similar distance away, was shot and killed by arrows. He embarked for that location with a large number of Guyebi Papuans; however they returned to his residence before he did, broke into his house, and surrounded it for days while armed.

Due to these incidents the colonial administrator closed the Iwam area. Nevertheless, in June, a Lutheran missionary named Welsch obtained a permit to enter. He visited Crassen's outstations and left two or three Lutheran coastal Papuans at each location. This was against colonial administrator instructions that coastal Papuans had to be accompanied by a European when in that area. Huts were built for those Papuans, which they lived in for months.

In November 1935 Crassen was informed that the presence of the Lutheran Papuans was causing tension with Papuans nearby one of his outstations. He then told one of them, at the outstation nearby Kekaru, that he had to leave the area; and he would be put in jail if he remained. He saw an increasing amount of weapons being carried openly by local Papuans during this time. Crassen additionally claimed that two of the Lutheran Papuans had plotted with another local Papuan to make an attack while 'his natives' were at church. He first confirmed these reports, and then on the following Sunday took measures to get rid of two Lutheran Papuans at Keraku.

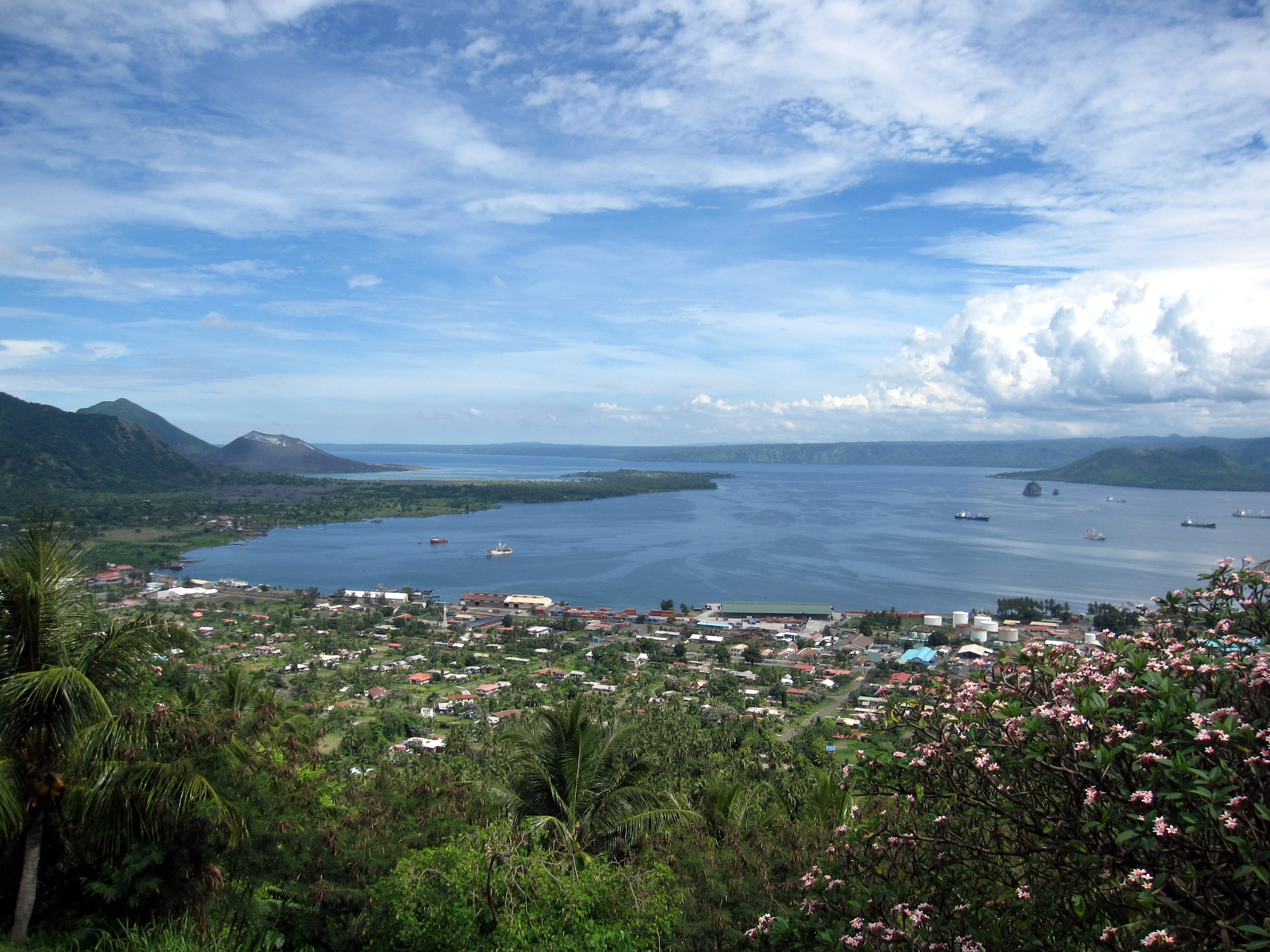
Pictured: Present day Rabaul, the location of the Supreme Court in which Cranssen received his initial 5-year sentence from Wanliss J

Cranssen then sent six of his coastal Papuan men to Keraku with instructions to eject the two Lutherans from their huts, and burn them down. They took two rifles and two shotguns with them; and he instructed his men to use them against local Papuans if attacked, but not against the two Lutherans. The firearms weren't used. The huts were partially burned down, and the two Lutherans were assaulted and forcibly brought to Crassen.

He then commended the actions of his men and ordered the Lutherans to leave. They did so, and as a result of their report, Cranssen was called upon for an explanation by the colonial administrator. His explanation of the affair was delivered in broken English. He stated in effect that he had acted in self-defence; that the Lutheran mission had 'unwarrantably' come into his field of work and left men there without supervision. He said that his created a feeling of danger across the missions, and he would be attacked. He said it was necessary to burn down their huts otherwise they might return.

Cranssen was then prosecuted for wilful and unlawful destruction of native dwellings. He was committed to trial, and at the Supreme Court at Rabaul; he was indicted for arson. He was advised by his solicitor to plead guilty and he did so. He later claimed before the High Court that he was unaware of what he was pleading guilty to, and that his solicitor had advised him that a guilty plea would only result in a fine of between five and ten pounds.

The Chief Justice David Wanliss took a 'most adverse view' of Cranssen's conduct and sentenced him to five years' imprisonment with hard labour. Wanliss J is reported to have called Cranssen during the trial 'a traitor to his church - a church that had spread Christianity to all parts of the earth', and said 'you are rendering the work of the Government more hard and more dangerous, and your conduct may be the cause of loss of life for years to come'.

Cranssen then sought leave to appeal at the High Court. He was represented by Eugene Gorman KC.

== Judgement ==
=== Dixon, Evatt, McTiernan JJ ===
The majority re-iterated its contemporaneously recent comments in House v The King, that sentences will ordinarily not be interfered with; unless there is a reason to believe that the lower court improperly exercised its discretion. The improper inclusion or exclusion of relevant considerations, mistakes as to the facts, errors of law, or 'views or opinions which are extreme or misguided' were all cited as reasons to interfere. However the court said that it isn't 'necessary that some definite or specific error be assigned'. An obvious or manifest error would also suffice to justify an interference.

The majority wrote:

'In short, the principles which guide courts of appeal in dealing with matters resting in the discretion of the court of first instance restrain the intervention of this court to cases where the sentence appears unreasonable, or has not been fixed in the due and proper exercise of the court's authority. Moreover, this court has always recognized that, in appeals from courts of the territories, there may be many matters upon which the court appealed from is in a better position to judge than we can be. It is familiar with the special conditions which obtain in the territory and thus should be better able to estimate the importance of considerations arising out of them, or the significance of facts associated with them.

...

In accordance with these principles this court recently refused leave to appeal in a case in which the same learned judge inflicted a severe sentence upon a missionary who made a punitive raid upon natives in his district, took one of them captive and kept him bound, and behaved towards the natives in a harsh and provocative manner. To estimate the gravity and consequences of such an offence appeared to be peculiarly within the province of the Supreme Court of the Territory of New Guinea and this court refused to interfere, not because it approved of the sentence, but because it was unable to say that the sentence so exceeded the occasion as to be unreasonable, or to find any circumstances vitiating the exercise of the learned judge's discretion.'

Writing specifically of Cranssen's appeal, the court wrote:

'In the present case it appears manifest that a sentence of five years' imprisonment is out of all proportion to any view of the seriousness of the offence which could reasonably be taken. More over, we are not without knowledge of the views which actuated the learned judge in inflicting so great a punishment. His Honour seated at length his opinion of the facts, of the applicant's behaviour and of the consequences to which it might tend. No purpose is served by traversing this statement. But it contains many observations which support and confirm the conclusion that his Honour took altogether too extreme a view of the matter.

...

It may be granted that in no circumstances could the applicant be justified in causing the Lutheran boys' three huts to be burnt, that he ought not to have sent out his boys with arms upon any such enterprise, that such actions endanger the relations with the natives, and that in the motives which actuated him he was not free of resentment at the intrusion of the Lutherans in what he regarded as his field of missionary work. Allowing all this and allowing too that others must be deterred from following such an example, yet a term of five years' imprisonment appears a crushing punishment bearing no proportion either to the impropriety of the applicant's conduct or the kind of penalty which would suffice as a deterrent. After all, the offence consisted in burning three flimsy structures readily replaced. It is impossible completely to disregard the circumstantial account given by the applicant of the conditions of actual and apprehended danger in which he stood, and it is not denied that the Lutheran boys ought not to have been left in the area alone without white supervision, and that their continued presence there was unwarranted.'

The majority affirmed Cranssen's guilty verdict, but substituted his five-year sentence for one of six months.

== Aftermath ==
Cranssen served his sentence at the Emu Plains prison farm in New South Wales. It is not known what happened of him upon release. Copies of court and administrative records relating to the trial, conviction and appeals are stored at the University of Queensland.

== Significance ==
The Cranssen incident appears to have been of minor interest to historians, with documents relating to the incident and the trial stored at the ANU and University of Queensland.

Legally, Cranssen v R is often cited alongside House v R in appeals relating to the use of discretion in sentencing. As of October 2020 the case was most recently cited by the High Court in Lacey v Attorney-General, and it is often cited in Australia's lower courts of appeal. In Lacey it was cited for the propositions that there is no mandated deference by Courts of Appeal to a sentencing judge's advantage at trial; and that for a superior court to interfere with a sentence, it isn't enough that they would have imposed one of a different length, rather there must be a reason to believe the discretion was improperly exercised.
