= MIMA v Khawar =

Judgement of the High Court of Australia

- Court: High Court of Australia
- Full case name: Minister for Immigration and Multicultural Affairs v Khawar
- Decided: 11 April 2002
- Citation: 210 CLR 1; 2002 HCA 14

Court membership
- Judges sitting: Gleeson C.J., McHugh, Gummow, Kirby, and Callinan JJ

Case opinions
- Appeal dismissed Gleeson CJ; McHugh & Gummow JJ; Kirby J dissenting Callinan J

MIMA v Khawar is a decision of the High Court of Australia.

The case is an important decision in Australian refugee law. According to LawCite, the case has been cited the seventh most times of any High Court decision.

At issue in the appeal was an application for a protection visa by Ms Khawar, a citizen of Pakistan. Ms Khawar had fled Pakistan as a victim of domestic violence.

== Facts ==
World map of countries that are signatories of the Convention Relating to the Status of Refugees

Khawar and her children had arrived in Australia in June 1997, and lodged applications for protection visas shortly after. Her application was refused by a ministerial delegate. This refusal was then affirmed by the Refugee Review Tribunal.

In her failed applications for appeal Khawar had submitted evidence of the Pakistan police refusing to assist her in the face of serious domestic violence. She also made a submission that in effect claimed that discrimination against women in Pakistan is partly tolerated and sanctioned by the state. The Tribunal refused to make any findings regarding either of these submissions. It considered both claims irrelevant to her application. It assumed that the harm that Khawar feared was only motivated by personal circumstances relating to her marriage; and only examined the motivations of the perpetrator as being relevant. (Note: Under Art IA(2) of the refugee convention; to be eligible for protection, the fear of harm to a person must arise for reason of 'race, religion, nationality, political opinion, or membership of a particular social group')

Khawar made a successful appeal to the Federal Court before Branson J. The court found the Tribunal erred for incorrectly applying the refugee convention, and for failing to make findings in response to Khawar's submissions. The Minister's appeal to the full federal court was dismissed. Special leave was then granted by the High Court.

== Judgement ==
It was found that the refugee convention's requirement of 'persecution' could be satisfied even when harm to a victim is perpetrated by a non-State actor. A victim could be eligible for refugee protection if denied assistance they would ordinarily expect from the state in attempting to resolve a harm, so long as the reason for that neglect was a 'convention reason'. (Note: discrimination is for a 'convention reason' when it is motivate by reasons of race, religion, nationality, political opinion, or membership of a particular social group)

The court additionally found that it would be open for the Tribunal to declare that 'women in Pakistan' meets the description of 'particular social group' under the refugee convention. On the issue of such a group being quite large, Gleeson CJ wrote:

'The size of the group does not necessarily stand in the way ... There are instances where the victims of persecution in a country have been a majority. It is power, not number, that creates the conditions in which persecution may occur.'

The Minister's appeal was then dismissed by the court. Khawar's application was remitted to the Tribunal, for findings to be made regarding her submissions.

== See also ==
- MIMA v Haji Ibrahim
- List of High Court of Australia cases
