= Chan Yee Kin v Minister for Immigration & Ethnic Affairs =

Judgement of the High Court of Australia

Chan v MIEA
- Court: High Court of Australia
- Full case name: Chan v Minister for Immigration and Ethnic Affairs
- Decided: 1989
- Citation: 169 CLR 379

Court membership
- Judges sitting: Mason C.J., Dawson, Toohey, Gaudron and McHugh JJ

Case opinions
- Appeal allowed The delegate's decision was unreasonable, and should be set aside Mason J Dawson J Toohey J Gaudron J McHugh J

Chan Yee Kin v Minister for Immigration & Ethnic Affairs (Chan) is a decision of the High Court of Australia.

The case is an important decision in Australian refugee law, as it is relevant to the legal tests for refugee status. In particular, the case is authority for the High Court's view; that under the 1951 Refugee Convention and 1967 Status of Refugees protocol; a 'well founded fear' of persecution may be found to exist if there is a 'real chance' they will suffer that harm. aka; the 'real chance' test.

According to LawCite, Chan has been cited more times than any other decision of the High Court.

== Facts ==
Chan was born in 1951 in the PRC. He held citizenship in that country. In an interview with a departmental officer, he claimed as follows:

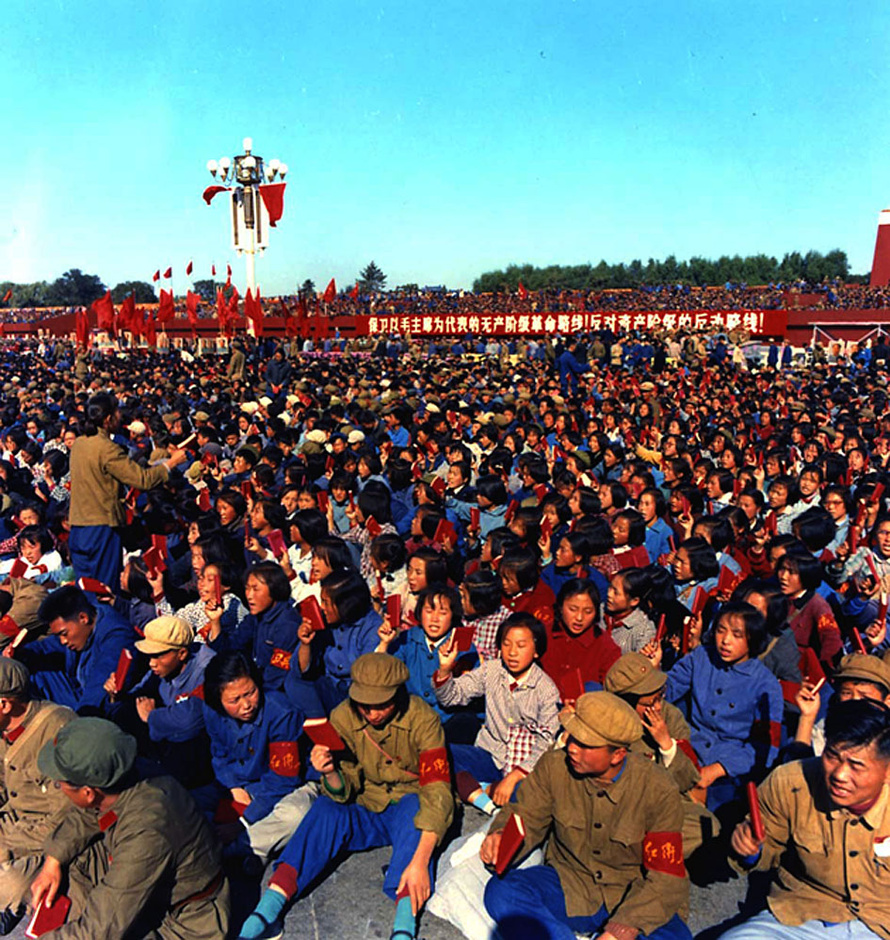
Red Guards in Tian'anmen Square, 1966

Chan had been a member of the Red Guards, and supported Chairman Mao. He later came to disagree with Mao's ideas, and joined a Political faction within the Red Guards opposed to Mao. After their struggle for power was unsuccessful, the faction's members were questioned by Police. This resulted in him being detained for two weeks in 1968 at a police station. His name was locally displayed in public as a person opposed to the state. He was assessed as a counter-revolutionary and exiled from his local area. Authorities had also discriminated against him and his family for his father's membership with the Kuomintang.

He was free to move around where he had been sent, but couldn't return to his home village or travel without written permits. He was detained three times between 1972 and 73 attempting to escape from his place of exile.

In 1974 he escaped to Macau where his father had arranged residency and identity documents. He then stowed away on a ship to Hong Kong where he resided illegally. He was deported to Macau, and returned to Hong Kong; before unlawfully entering Australia in August 1980.

In 1982 Chan applied for a visa by section 6A of the Migration Act 1958 (Cth). Subsection (I)(c) allowed for visas to be granted to people who: ... (b) met the status of Refugee under two relevant international agreements. These agreements were the 1951 Refugee Convention, and the 1967 Status of Refugees protocol. Relevantly under those agreements, a refugee was a person who 'owing to a well-founded fear of being persecuted for reasons of ... political opinion, is outside the country of their nationality'.

Chan's initial application for refugee status in accordance with his visa application; was unanimously rejected by the relevant committee. A review was made, which also determined he was not a refugee. Due to legal doubts, his application was again reconsidered. Chan was interviewed for this purpose by a departmental officer in June 1986. The committee reexamined him, and repeated their unanimous recommendation that his refugee status ought not be recognized. In August 1986 a Ministerial delegate reviewed that recommendation, and found that Chan was not a refugee under the convention.

At interview, the applicant was questioned about the relevance of his experiences in the 1960s to contemporary China. He said he knew the authorities still paid attention to him. They opened letters to his family, and questioned them as to his whereabouts. He said he feared imprisonment in China. Years earlier he had expressed (although later retracted), that if he had to be deported, he would rather it be to mainland China than Hong Kong or Macau. He was questioned about this statement at interview. His explanation was that he'd thought upon arrival he would face imprisonment in those places, followed thereafter by a deportation to the mainland.

When his application for a visa was rejected in April 1987, the delegate wrote that:

'I considered that the Applicant had no real political profile in the PRC ... he was unable to convey in detail his claimed political differences with the current regime in the PRC, nor provide any credible explanations that his internal exile and periods of detention were related to any political activities on his behalf.

I accepted that he may have been discriminated against to a limited degree due to the apparent perception the local authorities had of his family, but I considered that this did not amount to persecution within the terms of the Convention.

I accepted the Committee members' views that while he may be the subject of some attention having escaped from the area where he was assigned in the PRC, any such attention would not constitute a basis for a well-founded fear of persecution.

I also noted that his original preference if made to leave Australia was to return to the PRC, a statement not likely to be made by someone with a well-founded fear of persecution in that country. Although I note his latest preference of return to Macau (within guarantees), I consider it inconsistent with a well-founded fear that he would not have at all times considered the suggested alternatives of Hong Kong or Macau as preferable to his country of citizenship. I concluded that the Applicant did not have a well-founded fear of persecution should he be returned to the PRC Accordingly, I determined he was not a refugee within the meaning of the Convention and Protocol'

A consequence of Chan's application being rejected by the delegate was that his family's visas would also be cancelled. Chan had been residing in Australia with his wife and young child.

Keely J overturned the decision at appeal on an ADJRA ground that the minister's decision was unreasonable. On appeal the Full Federal Court set aside Keely J's decision and restored that of the delegate.

Chan then appealed to the High Court.

== Judgement ==
Chan's case was that three aspects of the delegate's reasons were unreasonable;

1. That Chan's exile and subsequent detention, didn't amount to persecution under the convention.
2. That the authorities subjecting Chan to "some attention" for escaping his place of exile, didn't provide a basis for a well-founded fear of persecution.
3. That there was no well-founded fear of persecution because Chan had stated his original preference, if deported, was to go back to China.

In five separate judgements, each Justice allowed Chan's appeal. Each found on the evidence that the Minister had acted unreasonably.

=== Justice McHugh ===
McHugh observed that international common law courts have given different interpretations to the term 'well founded fear' under the convention and protocol. He noted US decisions holding that a 'well-founded fear' may be established, even if persecution is unlikely. The US Justices had remarked that even a low chance, like a 10 percent chance that persecution would occur, was enough.

He then found that 'if there is a real chance that the applicant will be persecuted, his fear should be characterised as "well founded" for convention purposes'. Obviously though, he noted, 'far fetched possibilities' of persecution would be excluded. He then discussed the scope and contents of the word 'persecuted' under the convention and protocol.

He noted that delegates finding that Chan had 'been discriminated against to a limited degree' due to political perceptions. The delegate said that 'this did not amount to persecution under the convention'. McHugh found this statement to be unreasonable, as the discrimination had involved Chan being exiled for six years. McHugh held 'exile for such a lengthy period for (a political) reason would be a serious invasion of the appellant's freedom and would constitute "persecution" within the Convention'.

Turning to the second appeal point; McHugh noted it wasn't clear what the delegate had meant by 'some attention'. Regardless, he found it unreasonable for the delegate to have held Chan's fear of further exile or detention as not well founded. Chan was identified with counter-revolutionary political opinion and had previously been exiled for it. Authorities had maintained an interest in Chan. On the evidence, McHugh found; exile for an indeterminate period, or imprisonment of up to two years 'must be regarded as having a real chance of occurring'. Therefore, McHugh found the delegate's reasons were in error and couldn't be supported 'on any reasonable basis'.

Turning to third reason, McHugh found;

'the appellant's preference was not inconsistent with a well-founded fear of persecution in China if, as he asserted, he would be sent back to China in any event, perhaps after being imprisoned in Macau or Hong Kong. There was no evidence repudiating this assertion. Hence, the delegate could not reasonably find that the appellant's preference for a return to China was inconsistent with a well-founded fear'.

The respondent was ordered to pay costs, and the decision on Chan's visa was remitted to the Minister for reconsideration.

== Significance ==
Chan has been frequently cited in Australian courts for the legal tests associated with refugee findings. It is authority for the High Court's view that under the convention; a finding that a person has a 'well founded fear' of persecution, need only be satisfied by there being a 'real chance' they will suffer that harm. Chan's legal test is sometimes referred to in shorthand as the 'real chance' test.

It is the most often cited legal test of the High Court, according to LawCite. The frequency with which Chan has been cited, may be due to the high number of written Tribunal decisions that have been generated by decisions on refugee status at the Administrative Appeals Tribunal and its predecessor bodies.

== See also ==
- Chen Shi Hai v MIMA
- MIEA v Guo
- List of High Court of Australia cases
