= Veen v R (No 2) =

Australian legal case

- Court: High Court of Australia
- Full case name: Veen v. The Queen (No.2)
- Decided: 29 March 1988
- Citations: [1988] HCA 14, 164CLR 465

Court membership
- Judges sitting: Mason CJ, Wilson, Brennan, Deane, Dawson, Toohey & Gaudron JJ

Case opinions
- appeal dismissed Mason CJ, Brennan, Dawson, Toohey JJ dissent Wilson J Deane J Gaudron J

Veen v R (No 2) is a decision of the High Court of Australia.

The case is a notable decision in Australian Criminal Law, as it is an authority for the principles that apply when a sentence is imposed by a court.

It is the High Court's 25th most cited case.

== Facts ==
=== Background prior to matter ===
Robert Charles Vincent (known as Bobby Veen) was born February 13, 1955 in Bourke, NSW. Veen was a member of the Stolen Generations, removed from his Aboriginal family in 1956. He was placed in an orphanage at La Perouse, NSW, before being fostered in 1957 by the Veen family in Albury, NSW. Although his legal name remained Robert Charles Vincent throughout his life, he was convicted under the name Robert Charles Vincent Veen.

The transcript for Veen v R (No 2) [1988] HCA 14 states: "A male teacher at his school introduced him to homosexual activity." However, records indicate that he was 12 years old at the time, meaning this incident constituted childhood sexual abuse rather than consensual activity. This context is relevant in understanding the background to his later offending.

Anecdotally, among family and close associates, Veen reportedly saw himself as a "paedophile hunter" and believed that both of his victims were paedophiles. This belief was never tested in court. His childhood trauma and its impact on his actions remain a significant aspect of the case’s historical and legal analysis.

In 1971 at the age of 16, Veen was apprehended by police in Sydney's Hyde Park. He was taken to Darlinghurst Police Station where he stabbed himself. No charges were laid. Later that year he stabbed his landlady four times after a bout of drinking. He appeared before the Children's court and was convicted of malicious wounding, and was committed to an institution.

In 1975, then aged 20 and a sex worker, Veen killed Trevor Michael Ward. (Veen v R (No 1). The two had been drinking heavily, and Ward had refused to pay for sexual services, racially abusing Veen for being Aboriginal when he requested payment.

One of the character witnesses at Veen’s sentencing hearing in Veen v R (No 1) was Father Vincent Kiss, a Catholic priest with experience in youth welfare. In 2002, Kiss was convicted of sexually abusing teenage boys during the 1960s.

Veen was charged with murder but convicted of manslaughter by a jury. This derived from a tacit finding by the jury that Veen was suffering from 'such abnormality of mind ... as substantially impaired his mental responsibility'. Rath J the trial judge sentenced Veen to life imprisonment. This was then overturned on a successful appeal to the High Court, which instead imposed a sentence of 12 years. Veen was granted a parole release on 20 January 1983.

=== Veen No 2 offence ===
On 27 October 1983 Veen killed Paul Edmund Hoson, whom he had stabbed repeatedly with a bread knife. Hoson had invited Veen to his flat for sex. Veen was again charged with murder but the Crown accepted a plea of guilty to manslaughter, again on the grounds of diminished responsibility. Evidence was led at the sentencing hearing about Veen's personal circumstances. Veen had been raised by foster parents, and had a disturbed childhood. He was removed from his foster parents care, and was sexually abused by a male teacher at his school. He performed poorly academically, and had brain damage due to excessively drinking alcohol.

Despite accepting these submissions, the trial judge Justice Hunt sentenced Veen to life imprisonment. After noting the similarities between Veen's killing of Hoson and his prior manslaughter conviction, Hunt J wrote:

'I am satisfied that the prisoner is potentially or indeed, certainly – a continuing danger to society when released, in that he is likely to kill again or to inflict serious injury upon his release by reason of his brain damage should he be under the influence of alcohol and find himself in any situation of stress. I therefore feel unable to mitigate the severity of a life sentence by reason of the prisoner's abnormal mental condition.'

Veen's appeal to the Court of Appeal failed. He then applied for special leave at the High Court. Leave wasn't granted, instead the special leave application was deferred to coincide with the full hearing.

== Judgment ==
The majority held for the crown, dismissing Veen's appeal. After discussing the facts of the case, the majority elaborated upon sentencing principles.

The purposes of sentencing were discussed by the majority, in a passage that has since been cited many times:

'... sentencing is not a purely logical exercise, and the troublesome nature of the sentencing discretion arises in large measure from unavoidable difficulty in giving weight to each of the purposes of punishment. The purposes of criminal punishment are various: protection of society, deterrence of the offender and of others who might be tempted to offend, retribution and reform. The purposes overlap and none of them can be considered in isolation from the others when determining what is an appropriate sentence in a particular case. They are guideposts to the appropriate sentence but sometimes they point in different directions.'

== Aftermath ==
Veen was released from prison on compassionate grounds in 2015, after being diagnosed with cancer. He was eligible for parole in 2003, but was refused because 'No one wanted to be the one responsible for Bobby Veen, releasing him back into society and then having it happen for a third time'. In prison, he sought solace in art and classical music, and found an opportunity to reconnect with his indigenous family and heritage.

== Significance ==
The purposes behind sentencing as mentioned in Veen is relevant to all sentencing decisions that draw upon the common law in Australia. The Veen principles have been codified in some states, such as in the NSW Crimes (Sentencing Procedure) Act 1986
