= MIMA v Haji Ibrahim =

Court decision

- Court: High Court of Australia
- Full case name: Minister for Immigration and Multicultural Affairs v Haji Ibrahim
- Decided: 26 October 2000
- Citation: 204 CLR 1; 2000 HCA 55

Court membership
- Judges sitting: Gleeson C.J., Gaudron, McHugh, Gummow, Kirby, Hayne and Callinan JJ

Case opinions
- Appeal allowed Gleeson CJ; Gummow J Hayne J Callinan J dissent Gaudron J McHugh J Kirby J

MIMA v Haji Ibrahim is a decision of the High Court of Australia.

The case is an important decision in Australian refugee law.

According to LawCite, the case has been cited the fourth most times of any High Court decision.

== Facts ==
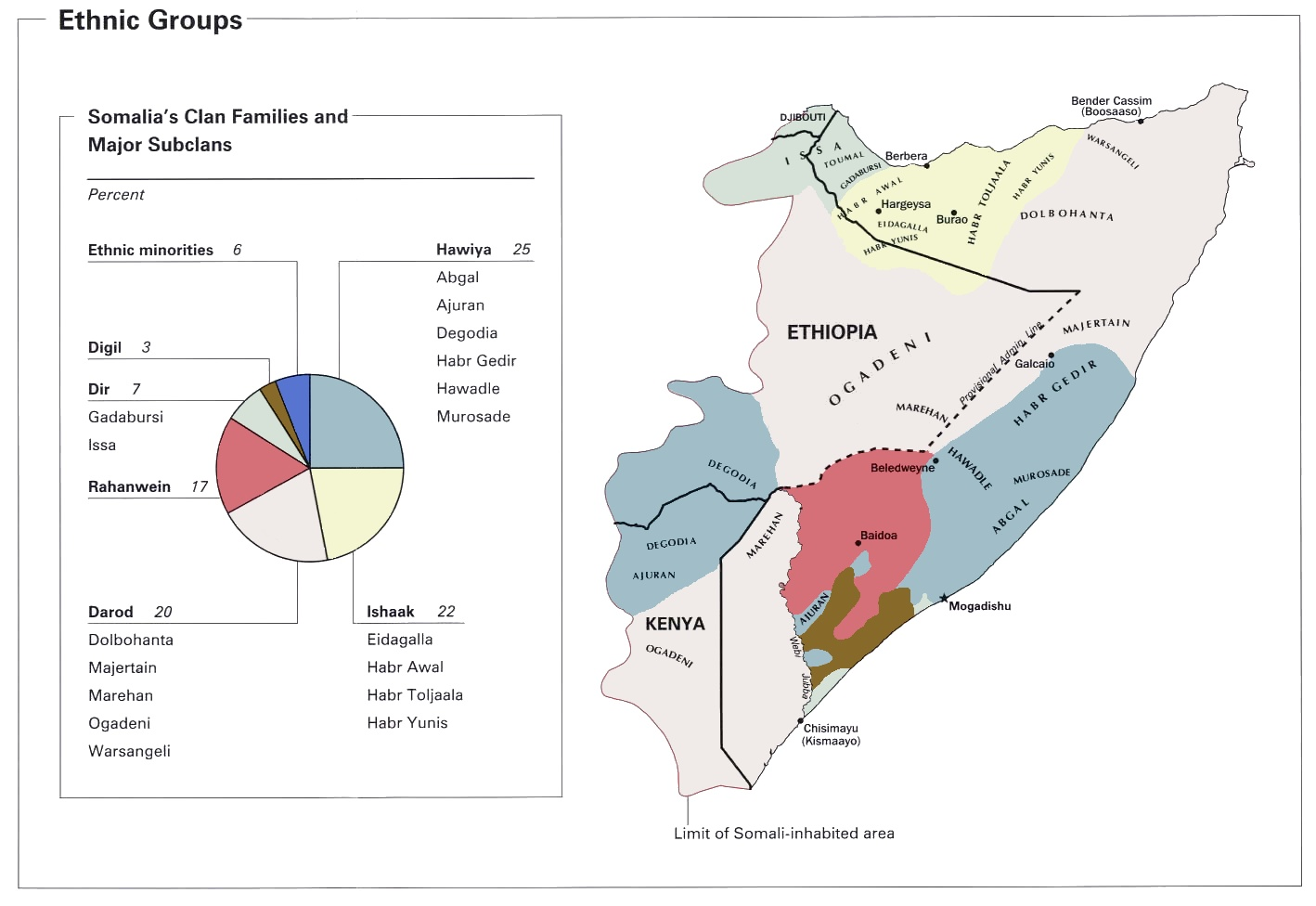
Pictured: a map of Somali ethnic groups in 2002

Haji Ibrahim was refused a protection visa by a delegate of the immigration minister in 1998. He appealed the decision, and was unsuccessful at first instance before Katz J, but won at a full court hearing before O'Connor, Tamberlin, and Mansfield JJ.

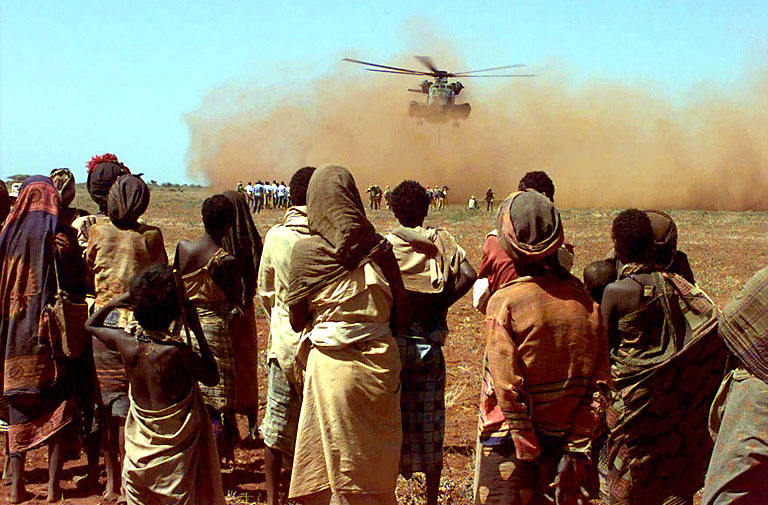
Pictured: an American helicopter delivering wheat donated by the Australian Government during the 1990s civil conflict in Somalia. Haji Ibrahim had fled this conflict.

The Tribunal had affirmed the Minister's refusal. It was unsatisfied that Ibrahim possessed a 'well-founded fear of being persecuted for reasons of race, religion, nationality, membership of a particular social group or political opinion' if he was to return to Somalia. It found that while Somalia was in a state of civil war; the danger arising from this fact alone was not enough to make a finding of refugee status. According to the tribunal, while Ibrahim belonged to a minority ethnic group named the Rahanweyn clan, the persecution he would have faced was indicative of 'the ordinary risks of clan warfare, largely involving struggles for power and resources, in a context of instability and anarchy'. Members of all clans were found to be at risk, but this was not enough, in the Tribunal's view; to 'convert the conflict into persecution'.

The Full Court agreed that 'the mere fact a civil conflict is 'clan based' does not make its victims the victims of persecution. It found that the tribunal should have assessed the motivation behind the clan based warfare to determine whether there had been persecution for a convention reason. The Tribunal's failure to assess the motivation behind an incident where Ibrahim had been captured was found an error of law. The court found it should have evaluated whether the reason he was detained was 'driven by the intent to repress his particular clan'.

The Minister was then granted special leave to appeal before the High Court.

== Judgement ==
In separate judgements, a majority of the High Court found that the Tribunal had not committed an error of law. The decision to refuse Ibrahim a refugee visa was affirmed by the court.

== Significance ==
Ibrahim is one of the High Court's most cited cases, as it is often included in the written reasons of Tribunal and Court decisions for refugee visa matters. For this reason it is one of the most cited High Court cases in Australia, ranking number four on LawCite.

The case is frequently cited for the proposition that 'the Convention definition of ‘refugee’ does not encompass those fleeing generalised violence, internal turmoil, or civil war'.

== See also ==
- Chan Yee Kin v Minister for Immigration & Ethnic Affairs
- List of High Court of Australia cases
