= Heihaizi =

Unregistered births in China

- Traditional Chinese: 黑孩子
- Simplified Chinese: 黑孩子
Transcriptions
Standard Mandarin
- Hanyu Pinyin: hēiháizi
- Bopomofo: ㄏㄟㄏㄞˊ ˙ㄗ

Heihu
- Traditional Chinese: 黑戶
- Simplified Chinese: 黑户
Transcriptions
Standard Mandarin
- Hanyu Pinyin: hēihù
- Bopomofo: ㄏㄟㄏㄨˋ

Person without hukou
- Traditional Chinese: 無戶口人員
- Simplified Chinese: 无户口人员
Transcriptions
Standard Mandarin
- Hanyu Pinyin: wú hùkǒu rényuán
- Bopomofo: ㄨˊ ㄏㄨˋ ㄎㄡˇ ㄖㄣˊ ㄩㄢˊ

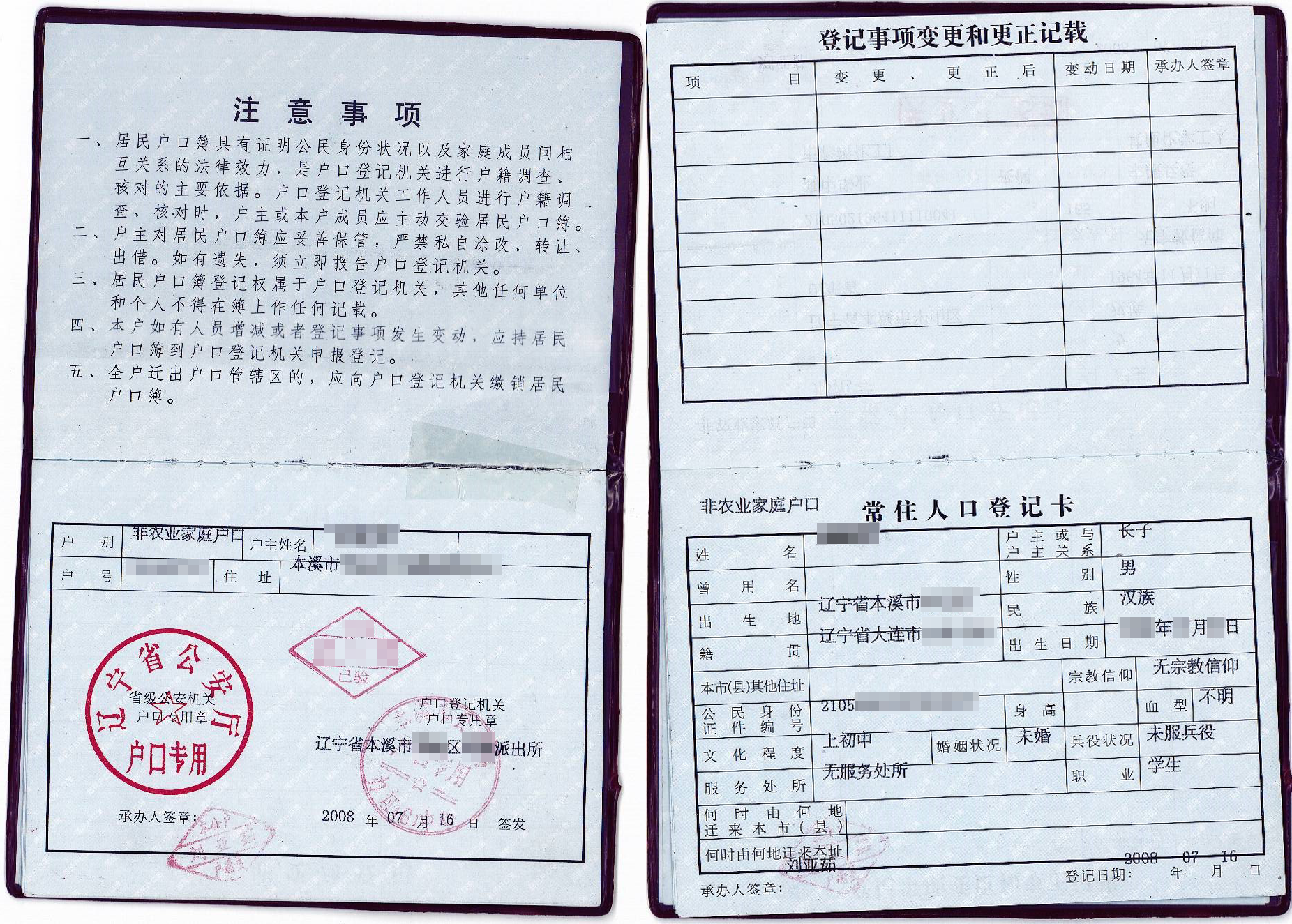
Heihaizi lacked any ability to obtain their household registration (hukou, example pictured above), a critically important identity document in the People's Republic of China, for decades

Heihaizi (lit. 'black children') is a term applied in the People's Republic of China. Also rendered in English as illegal children or invisible children, the term heihaizi refers to children born in spite of the one-child policy, or more generally any children who are not registered in the national household registration system (hukou system), such as children born out of wedlock. Such children faced severe discrimination and lack of access to government services in China, with some even becoming stateless. The synonymous term heihu (lit. 'black hukou') refers to an unregistered person of any age.

After changes to Chinese law in 2015, access to family registration began to be decoupled from one's family planning status, and fees for receiving registrations were abolished, leading to almost 750,000 registrations in the first six months of the relaxed rules. However, older overseas Chinese adults and those without proper documentation may continue to experience barriers due to their status as heihaizi.

== History ==
During the rule of Chairman of the Chinese Communist Party Mao Zedong, the availability of safer food and water and better living conditions led to a 400% decrease in infant mortality and an almost doubling of the average life expectancy from thirty years prior. As a result, the Chinese Communist Party officials began drawing conclusions regarding the effect of this rapid population growth on their modernizing economy and decided that something must be done. Influenced by Chen Muhua's goal of "reducing the country's birth rate to 10% within three years," a government plan was created in 1979 to limit the number of children a mother could have to two.

The desire for China to expand and grow economically following the Cultural Revolution became the driving force behind the one-child policy because the Chinese Communist Party believed such a goal could not be achieved without slowing population growth and limiting the population to 1.1–1.2 billion by 2000. Implementation of the one-child policy included incentivizing families using privileges regarding education, living accommodations, and access to health care as well as monetary aid. Having more than one child was also discouraged by penalizing families by limiting or removing their access to those same privileges.

These incentives and penalties were used to regulate the number of children allowed and spacing between those children should the family be allowed to have a second child. They were also used to regulate childbearing years of older couples that decided to get married. While the State Family Planning Bureau sets specific expectations for the one-child policy, local family-planning departments are in charge of implementation within their own region. This has led to a wide variation from province to province in the system that governs incentives and penalties used to regulate Chinese families. Minority groups are considered one of the few families that are exempted from the one-child limit.

Other exceptions include families where both parents are only children or occupy dangerous jobs. It is also possible that a couple could be permitted a second child if their firstborn is disabled. Outside of these specific exceptions, some families are permitted a second child depending on where they live. Government employees and other city residents face very strict enforcement of the law while rural communities are often granted another child, mostly if their firstborn is female.

The household registration system in China, also called hukou, works in conjunction with the birth registration process to signify that each child is properly registered. Registration with hukou is necessary for the child to acquire the citizenship needed for specific benefits and programs under the one-child policy. In order to register with hukou, each child must have proper documentation from the public health and local family planning department and a medical birth certificate, both of which are received after birth registration, as well as valid identification of the parents.

Any child whose birth was illegal under then-existing Chinese law was likely to be unreported to the authorities through the required birth registration process, the family register, often to avoid financial or social penalties. Such unregistered children are termed heihaizi. Other children of such illegal birth, whose parents choose to properly report the birth and pay the monetary penalty imposed, are not heihaizi. Being excluded from the family register (in effect, a birth certificate), they do not legally exist and as a result cannot access most public services, such as education and health care, and do not receive protection under the law.

Without birth and hukou registration, the child cannot inherit or obtain property, receive insurance coverage for medical or social purposes, collect financial aid, or attend school unless financial penalties are paid. These "black-listed" children are also denied many rights when they become adults. They are unable to apply for government or other jobs, get married and start a family, or join the armed forces. Aside from illegal occupation that does not require registration, such as organised crime and prostitution, heihaizi have the option to remain with their family and assist with private work, such as agriculture or private businesses.

In some parts of China children are conceived and born with the purpose of being sold to human traffickers, usually soon after birth. Traffickers then sell them to wealthy families within China or take them abroad, again, to sell them. These children may be used for factory labour, whilst a large market in child brides and underage brothels also exists for girls in particular.

During the 2000 Chinese census report the number of persons not registered was estimated at 8,052,484 persons, which amounted to 0.65% of the total population at the time.

In cases where contraception fails resulting in an unapproved pregnancy, some women choose not to have an abortion. These women tend to avoid seeking medical care throughout the pregnancy and during delivery due to the chance they will be forced to have an abortion or the financial penalties they would face. This has resulted in a high rate of maternal and infant deaths.

== Gender ==
Due to the one-child policy and a cultural preference for male over female children, some Chinese women are known to give birth to female children in secret, hoping that a later child will be male. The male child is then registered as the parents' only child.

A large percentage of heihaizi in China are female, as a result of their expendability in the eyes of Chinese culture. According to Li, Zheng, and Feldmen, a surprise investigation of a Chinese province in 2004 revealed that 70–80% of the 530,000 people found to be unregistered were females. These "nonexistent" females are forced to live in concealment without access to education or medical care unless they are abandoned in an orphanage. As a result of underreporting of more female than male births, population statistics for China are compromised and infant sex ratios are drastically skewed. However, secretly giving birth to a female accounts for only part of compromised population statistics.

While it is illegal in China to participate in sex-selective abortion, it is still widely used, distorting the infant sex ratio and increasing the sex-ratio gap. In some instances where a second child is permitted, it is known that if the firstborn is female, subsequent pregnancies bearing a female will "disappear", leaving open the option for the family to have a son. Females have become scarce due to the decline in female births which has led to the development of criminal activities involving kidnapping and selling women as brides. This industry could threaten the stability of an already-insecure Chinese population through the rise of HIV and other STDs spread by commercial sex workers. The female population is also declining because the pressure for females to give birth to a son, and the pressure of the secret lives of heihaizi women is so overwhelming, that China has one of the highest suicide rates among adult women in the world.

== Living as a heihaizi ==
As a heihaizi, a person does not possess a hukou, "an identifying document, similar in some ways to the American social security card." This document is essential for a person to access or use any type of government service, which due to the political structure of China means that hospitals, traveling, education, and in many cases even jobs are not available.

Heihaizi are often forced to work illegal jobs in organized crime, such as prostitution and drug dealing.

== Abolishment of the one-child policy ==
In December 2015, General Secretary of the Chinese Communist Party Xi Jinping announced that nearly 13 million heihaizi would be given household registration, regardless of past family-planning violations. A State Council guideline issued on 14 January 2016 instructed local police stations to register eight categories of residents without hukou—including children born outside birth quotas or out of wedlock—"as legal residents" with no preconditions aside from basic documents.

This central government policy delinked hukou registration from the payment of any of the fines or penalties for "social compensation" that had previously been levied on parents for unauthorized births, leading to almost 750,000 registrations in the first six months of the relaxed rules. In one instance, a Beijing woman named Li Xue received her hukou twenty-three years after she was born. As of 2021, China's amended Population and Family Planning Law has abolished the levying of fines for giving birth to children out of wedlock ("out-of-plan").

Overseas Chinese are likewise able to receive their hukou registration by either approaching authorities inside China or at Chinese embassies and consulates abroad. According to the Ministry of Public Security, all Chinese citizens have the "right to [a] hukou".

A 2015 study found that half of unregistered Chinese citizens were illiterate; this, combined with the effects of prolonged lack of access to health care and social services means that even once an adult has received their hukou, the effects on their lives of having been born as heihaizi can be permanent.

== See also ==
- Human rights in China
- Missing women of China

== Bibliography ==
- Hesketh, Therese; Lu, Li; Xing, Zhu Wei (2005). "The effect of China's one-child family policy after 25 years" (PDF). New England Journal of Medicine. 353 (11): 1171–76. doi:10.1056/NEJMhpr051833. PMID 16162890.
- Kane, Penny; Choi, Ching Y (1999). "China's One Child Family Policy". British Medical Journal. 319 (7215): 992–4. doi:10.1136/bmj.319.7215.992. PMC 1116810. PMID 10514169.
- Li, Shuzhuo; Zhang, Yexia; Feldman, Marcus W (2010). "Birth Registration in China: Practices, Problems, and Policies". Population Research and Policy Review. 29 (3): 297–317. doi:10.1007/s11113-009-9141-x. PMC 2990197. PMID 21113384.
- Vortherms, Samantha A. (June 2019). "China's Missing Children: Political Barriers to Citizenship through the Household Registration System". The China Quarterly. 238: 309–330. doi:10.1017/S0305741018001716. ISSN 0305-7410.
- Zhou, Yingying (14 June 2005). "Uncovering Children in Marginalization: Explaining Unregistered Children in China". International Union for the Scientific Study of Population (conference paper). Office of Population Research, Princeton University. Archived from the original (PDF) on 18 July 2011.
