= Chen Shi Hai v MIMA =

Judgement of the High Court of Australia

- Court: High Court of Australia
- Full case name: Chen Shi Hai v The Minister for Immigration and Multicultural Affairs
- Decided: 13 April 2000
- Citation: 201 CLR 293

Court membership
- Judges sitting: Gleeson C.J., Gaudron, Gummow, Kirby, and Hayne JJ

Case opinions
- Appeal allowed with costs Gleeson CJ, Gaudron, Gummow, and Hayne JJ; Kirby J

Chen Shi Hai v MIMA, also known as 'Chen', is a decision of the High Court of Australia.

The case is an important decision in Australian refugee law. According to LawCite, Chen has been cited the third most times of any High Court decision.

== Facts ==
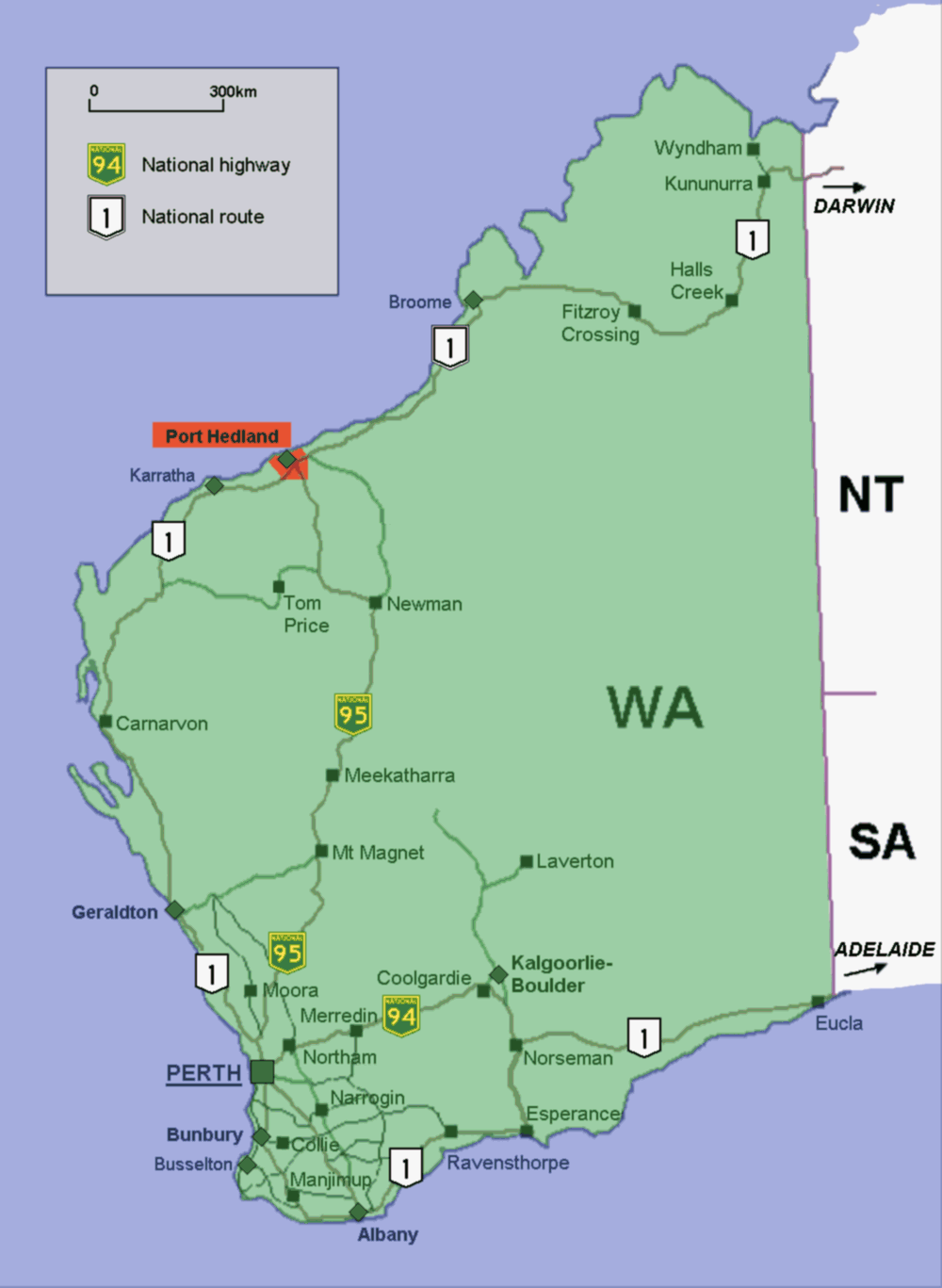
Port Hedland; the location of the detention centre in which Chen and his family were detained

Chen Shi Hai was conceived and born in 1996 whist his parents were being held in the Port Hedland Immigration Detention Centre. His parents were in breach of China's 'one child policy', as they had already had two other children, Chen's siblings; on the mainland. Chen's brother was with him in the centre, but his sister was in China at the time. The parents had been refused protection in Australia by the Department of Immigration. Chen's father sought a refugee visa on his behalf, arguing that as he was a 'black child' under the one child policy, he would suffer persecution if returned to China.

The application for a protection visa was refused. This decision was affirmed by the RRT. The Tribunal found that:

(the appellant) 'faces a real chance of persecution ... because of (in a strict causative sense) his membership of a particular social group' but not for reasons of his membership of [that] group'. That was because the consequences which the appellant would be likely to suffer in China would not 'result from any malignity, enmity or other adverse intention towards him on the part of the [Chinese] authorities'. Rather, in the Tribunal's view, it would result from their intention 'to penalize those who have children outside the approved guidelines'

Chen's father then sought judicial review on his behalf. At first instance, French J found that Chen was entitled to refugee protection, and on that basis remitted the decision to the Tribunal.

The Minister appealed, and won at the Full Federal Court. The majority (O'Loughlin and Carr JJ, R D Nicholson J dissenting) found that the adverse treatment likely to befall Chen was not by reason of him being a member of a social group of 'black children'. Rather, they held; it was because of his parents conduct in contravening the relevant laws of China'. They further found that more generally, 'black children' as a group were not a relevant social group capable of securing protection under the Refugee convention.

Chen's father then arranged an appeal to the High Court.

== Judgement ==
The High Court upheld Chen's appeal, finding that he was entitled to refugee protection. They found that he was a 'black child' under China's one child policy, and as such; was a member of a 'particular social group' for the purposes of the Refugee Convention. They adopted the Tribunal's finding that persecution would be suffered by Chen upon return; and that a 'well founded fear' existed, as his parents' held those fears on his behalf.

In making its decision, the court distinguished Chen from the case Applicant A v MIEA; a case which had found persons who feared enforced sterilization for opposing China's one-child policy, did not constitute a 'particular social group' under the convention. The distinction drawn by the High Court derived from an observation that Chen did not contravene the policy, rather, he was born in contravention of it.

The High Court then discussed the meaning of 'persecution' under the convention, saying:

... the question whether the different treatment of persons of a particular race, religion, nationality or political persuasion or who are members of a particular social group constitutes persecution for that reason ultimately depends on whether that treatment is "appropriate and adapted to achieving some legitimate object of the country [concerned]". Moreover, it is "[o]nly in exceptional cases ... that a sanction aimed at persons for reasons of race, religion or nationality will be an appropriate means for achieving [some] legitimate government object and not amount to persecution

Whether the different treatment of different individuals or groups is appropriate and adapted to achieving some legitimate government object depends on the different treatment involved and, ultimately, whether it offends the standards of civil societies which seek to meet the calls of common humanity. Ordinarily, denial of access to food, shelter, medical treatment and, in the case of children, denial of an opportunity to obtain an education involve such a significant departure from the standards of the civilized world as to constitute persecution. And that is so even if the different treatment involved is undertaken for the purpose of achieving some legitimate national objective.

The fact that "black children" are treated differently in China in consequence of the "one-child policy", which is a policy of general application, is relevant to the question whether that treatment amounts to persecution. But if the conduct in question does amount to persecution, that consideration cannot then result in the conclusion that that persecution is not for the reason that they are "black children".

The High Court therefore overturned the lower court, making a finding that Chen was a member of a 'particular social group', in the convention sense.

== Legal Significance ==
Chen is one of the High Court's most cited cases, particularly for its discussion of when laws of a general application might give rise to a refugee protection claim. It has also been cited for the proposition that 'motivation in the sense of intention to inflict harm, is not necessarily an element of the concept of persecution', and for its general comments about what the act requires. It developed the jurisprudence of the meaning of the terms 'particular social group', and 'persecution' as relevant to refugee protection claims.

As it is often included in the written reasons of Tribunal and Court decisions for refugee visa matters; it is one of the most cited High Court cases in Australia, ranking number three on LawCite.

== Aftermath ==
Little public information is available about how Chen and his family fared after the High Court's decision. According to Dr Tania Penovic; Chen Shi Hai was detained from birth until he was five and a half; 28 days after his family members were issued with visas. As of 2003, Chen had been detained by the Australian government for a longer period of time than any other child. His total length of detention was 1,998 days.
