= House v The King =

Australian High Court Judgment

- Court: High Court of Australia
- Full case name: House v The King
- Decided: 1936
- Citation: 55 CLR 499

Court membership
- Judges sitting: Starke J, Dixon J, Evatt J, McTiernan J

Case opinions
- Starke J Dixon, Evatt, McTiernan JJ

House v The King is a decision of the High Court of Australia.

The case is notable as a statement of principle for sentencing discretion in Australian Criminal Law. Specifically, the case elaborates upon five types of errors that may lead to an appellate court exercising its own sentencing discretion in substitution for that of the sentencing judge. While House was a criminal case, its statement of principle regarding appeals of discretion is relevant to all areas of law.

House v The King has the second highest number of citations among High Court cases. (Note: LawCite citation statistics track the written judgments of courts, journal articles, and tribunals. (both in Australia and overseas)) (Note: Data is as of July 2023)

== Facts ==
Everard Henry House, a bankrupt, was ordered to apply for his discharge by the Federal Court of Bankruptcy. When the application was heard by the court, he was charged with offenses under the Bankruptcy Act 1924. The court had found that six months prior to House's petition in bankruptcy he had pawned unpaid property obtained on credit.

The presiding judge Lukin J sentenced House to three months imprisonment with hard labour. House sought appeal to the High Court on the ground that the sentence was excessive.

== Judgment ==
The majority judgment of Dixon, Evatt, and McTiernan JJ began with a brief recitation of the facts. They then stated legal principle regarding appeals of sentences writing:

'... the judgment complained of, namely, sentence to a term of imprisonment, depends upon the exercise of a judicial discretion by the court imposing it. The manner in which an appeal against an exercise of discretion should be determined is governed by established principles. It is not enough that the judges composing the appellate court consider that, if they had been in the position of the primary judge, they would have taken a different course.

It must appear that some error has been made in exercising the discretion. If the judge acts upon a wrong principle, if he allows extraneous or irrelevant matters to guide or affect him, if he mistakes the facts, if he does not take into account some material consideration, then his determination should be reviewed and the appellate court may exercise its own discretion in substitution for his if it has the materials for doing so.

It may not appear how the primary judge has reached the result embodied in his order, but, if upon the facts it is unreasonable or plainly unjust, the appellate court may infer that in some way there has been a failure properly to exercise the discretion which the law reposes in the court of first instance. In such a case, although the nature of the error may not be discoverable, the exercise of the discretion is reviewed on the ground that a substantial wrong has in fact occurred.'

Applying this statement of principle, the majority declined to interfere with the sentence imposed upon Mr House. His appeal was therefore dismissed. This statement of legal principle is the most cited passage of the High Court in its history.

== Significance ==
The joint majority judgment gave rise to what is sometimes referred to as the 'House errors'. Those errors are still used to determine whether appellate courts ought interfere with lower court sentencing.

Briefly stated, the five errors derived from the judgment are whether the lower court judge:

1. Acted on a wrong principle
2. Was guided by extraneous or irrelevant facts
3. Mistook the facts
4. Failed to take into account a material consideration
5. Imposed a sentence manifestly unreasonable, or plainly unjust

The law regarding appeals of sentences has developed in complexity since House v. The King.

The majority's statement of principle is not limited to criminal appeals, but applies to any appeal calling for a review of discretion. E.g. discretion exercised by public servants is reviewable on House grounds (excluding any effect of privative clauses).

== See also ==
- Federal Court of Bankruptcy
- Cranssen v R
