= General Motors New Zealand =

Subsidiary of General Motors

- Formerly: Holden New Zealand
- Type: Subsidiary
- Industry: Automotive
- Founded: 4 January 1926
- Headquarters: Karangahape Road, Auckland, New Zealand
- Key people: Jess Bala (Managing director)
- Products: Automobiles
- Brands: Buick; Chevrolet; Cadillac; Oldsmobile; Pontiac; Holden; Isuzu; Opel; Vauxhall; Bedford
- Number of employees: 35 (July 2016)
- Parent: General Motors

General Motors New Zealand Limited, formerly Holden New Zealand Limited, is a subsidiary of General Motors that distributes GM' motor vehicles, engines, components and parts in New Zealand.

This company was incorporated on 4 January 1926 to build and operate a local assembly plant in New Zealand. It was General Motors' first owned, not leased overseas plant. The plant began with the assembly of American GM vehicles – Chevrolet, Pontiac, Buick and Oldsmobile, followed by British Vauxhalls five years later. Following World War II, British sourced Vauxhalls continued to keep the plant running together with limited numbers (restricted by currency shortages) of Chevrolets and Pontiacs. Buick and Oldsmobile were dropped. In the late 1950s the Vauxhall, Chevrolet and Pontiac cars began to be replaced with Australian-sourced Holdens and the move to the Holden brand was completed in the 1970s.

The assembly of vehicles ended in 1990 and thereafter the business became a distributor of complete imported GM vehicles and spare parts, mainly from Australia and Korea. General Motors began withdrawing from right-hand drive markets in 2017, leaving the United Kingdom, Japan, India and Thailand over the next three years.

With Holden new-car sales in its home country nose-diving to just 4.1 per cent of the Australian market by the end of 2019, General Motors announced on 17 February 2020 that it would be retiring the Holden brand and pulling out of the last remaining right-hand-drive markets. It also announced that GM's right-hand-drive assembly plant in Thailand had been sold to Great Wall Motor.

As of 2022 General Motors New Zealand consists of three business groups, GM Specialty Vehicles (GMSV), Isuzu trucks, and Holden Aftersales.

== Assembly plants ==
=== Petone ===
The Petone assembly plant opened in 1926 and the first New Zealand assembled Chevrolet appeared on 31 August that year. Four months later its first Pontiac was assembled and Buicks followed a month after that. Oldsmobiles were added to the range in 1928. Vauxhalls first came off the line on 9 May 1931 and they were soon followed by Bedford trucks. The plant was expanded in 1938 and again in 1939 and production diversified to include Frigidaire refrigerators and freezers, Frigidaire's parent company was owned by GM from 1919 to 1979. By the outbreak of World War II in 1939 there were almost six acres under one roof. Wartime output included munitions and Universal Carriers as well as many other smaller products. Post-war Chevrolet production began in early 1947 but for some decades new car numbers were severely limited by government controls.

Although from March 1980 it made all the spark plugs for General Motors' production in Australia as well as New Zealand the Petone plant, GM announced plans to close the Petone plant in 1983, with the loss of 270 jobs. It was sold to ASC Flowers for use as a warehouse, with the sale being completed by September 1984.

=== Trentham ===
The Trentham assembly plant at the inland opposite end of the Hutt Valley was opened on 26 August 1967 by the Prime Minister of New Zealand Keith Holyoake and the Petone plant devoted to Frigidaire appliances. At this time, the company had almost one million square feet of floor space, situated on three (Petone and Trentham: assembly/manufacturing plants; Upper Hutt: parts, and later, assembly, warehouse and office facilities) properties in the Hutt Valley totalling 117 acres (0.47 km^{2}). In 1988, General Motors New Zealand announced plans to end local assembly of all but one car model, the Holden Commodore sedan, with the Holden Commodore wagon, Camira and Gemini, along with the Suzuki Swift being phased out and replaced with fully-assembled imports. In 1991, it ended all local assembly of passenger cars. In 2015, the former Trentham plant was sold to Weta Digital, while existing space is used by the New Zealand Army.

== Brands ==
General Motors New Zealand assembled and imported GM products from Chevrolet, Buick, Oldsmobile, and Pontiac from the United States; Holden from Australia; Isuzu from Japan; Opel from Germany; and Vauxhall and Bedford from the United Kingdom. However, for such a small market, it made little sense to have so many brands, so each was rationalised from the 1960s.

=== Chevrolet ===
==== 1926–1968 ====
Chevrolet motor vehicles were imported into New Zealand in factory right-hand drive from GM's Canadian assembly plant in Oshawa in Semi-Knock-down (SKD) kit form for local assembly. The first locally-built Chevrolet came off the line in August 1926 and the first Pontiac came off the line in December 1926. Production stopped during World War II but was resumed from 1947. The Petone plant assembled the Chevrolet Thriftmaster pickup the Chevrolet Deluxe four-door sedan, and the Chevrolet 210.

GM New Zealand produced the Chevrolet Bel Air from 1955 to 1960, but only as four-door sedans.

Throughout the 1960s the Canadian Chevrolet Impala was assembled, also only as four-door sedans.

General Motors management in the USA re-evaluated its export operations in 1968 and decided to cease all right-hand-drive exports of Chevrolet and Pontiac passenger vehicles worldwide after 1968 and thus Chevrolet as a brand effectively disappeared in New Zealand (and elsewhere) for the next three decades, other than by private or special-purpose imports, such as for ambulances and hearses.

==== 1998–2001 ====
Both Australia and New Zealand imported the Chevrolet Suburban built in right-hand-drive in Silao, Mexico, between February 1998 and January 2001. The model was badged in both countries as "Holden."

==== 2012–2020 ====
The Isuzu-derived Chevrolet Colorado went on sale in June 2012 in both Australia and New Zealand, sourced from General Motors Thailand in Rayong, Thailand. The Brazilian-built Chevrolet S-10 dual-cab became the 2017 facelifted model. Holden New Zealand's managing director, Kristian Aquilina said of it: "The Chevrolet Colorado revealed by our Brazilian colleagues is the result of ongoing work between Holden, Chevrolet Brazil and Chevrolet Thailand and is a clear indication of where the Holden Colorado is heading." The Colorado and Chevrolet Trailblazer SUV were made at the GM Thailand plant for both the North American and Australasian markets and was badged as "Holden" in both Australia and New Zealand.

The first-generation Chevrolet Volt was sold in New Zealand from late 2012, badged as a Holden. Due to poor sales in New Zealand (and also Australia) the second-generation Volt was not available in New Zealand. The car failed in both countries due to the huge price tag that put the model out of reach for most people.

The third-generation Chevrolet Equinox (EQ series) went on sale in Australia and New Zealand in December 2017. It was produced at GM's Ramos Arizpe assembly facility in Mexico, and replaced the Korean-built Holden Captiva five-seater. On 17 October 2018, Holden Australia halted production on the Equinox due to slow sales and unsold inventory at its dealerships however the Equinox continued to be sold in New Zealand through to 2020.

In 2018 the U.S. Chevrolet Silverado and Chevrolet Camaro were introduced to the New Zealand market through Holden Special Vehicles (HSV.) Both vehicles are "re-engineered" (converted from LHD to RHD) by HSV Australia's production facility in Clayton South and imported into New Zealand. Both retain their original "Chevrolet" badging in both countries. The Silverado range includes the 2500HD WT, 2500HD LTZ, 2500HD LTZ "Midnight" Edition, 2500HD LTZ "Custom Sport" Edition and the 3500HD LTZ.

Camaro models offered are the ZL1 and 2SS. Of the initial 550 2SS Camaros produced in Australia in 2018, 38 of those were built for the New Zealand market. HSV's Managing Director, Tim Jackson, said: "This project has been over three years in the making and involved millions of dollars of investment in product development, testing and validation. We set out with the goal of retaining the integrity of the left-hand-drive vehicle through the adoption of extensive engineering, development, and manufacturing processes. We are proud to say we believe we have achieved our goal". Production of the facelifted 2019 models commenced in Australia from April, 2019 with New Zealand receiving its first Camaro ZL1 models in late 2019.

The Holden Colorado made number five in New Zealand's top-10 new car sales for 2019. No other Holden products made the top-10.

==== 2021– ====
In July 2019 Holden New Zealand announced plans for the first ever factory-right hand drive, mid-engine Chevrolet Corvette for the Australian and New Zealand markets. Following General Motors announcement in February 2020 of the demise of Holden, Chevrolet later confirmed that the Corvette may still go ahead, possibly set to arrive in 2021 through GM Speciality Vehicles (GMSV), the successor to HSV. The first factory right-hand-drive C8 arrived in New Zealand in October 2021, with a further 28 Corvettes arriving in 2023. All 28 were pre-sold. The right-hand-drive Camaros are built at GM's Bowling Green facility in Kentucky, United States and exported directly to New Zealand (and Australia.) The NZ-market C8 is priced at NZ$154,990 for the 2LT Coupe, rising to NZ$169,990 for the 2LT Convertible and 3LT Coupe, NZ$184,990 for the 3LT Convertible, and NZ$197,990 for the Carbon Edition Coupe. All NZ models come with GM's mid-mounted 369 kW 6.2-litre V8 engine.

As of 2023, the Chevrolet Silverado continues to be imported to New Zealand from Australia in three variants: 1500 Trail Boss (priced at NZ$119,990), 1500 LTZ Premium (priced at NZ$130,990) and the HD LTZ Premium (priced at NZ$159,990.)

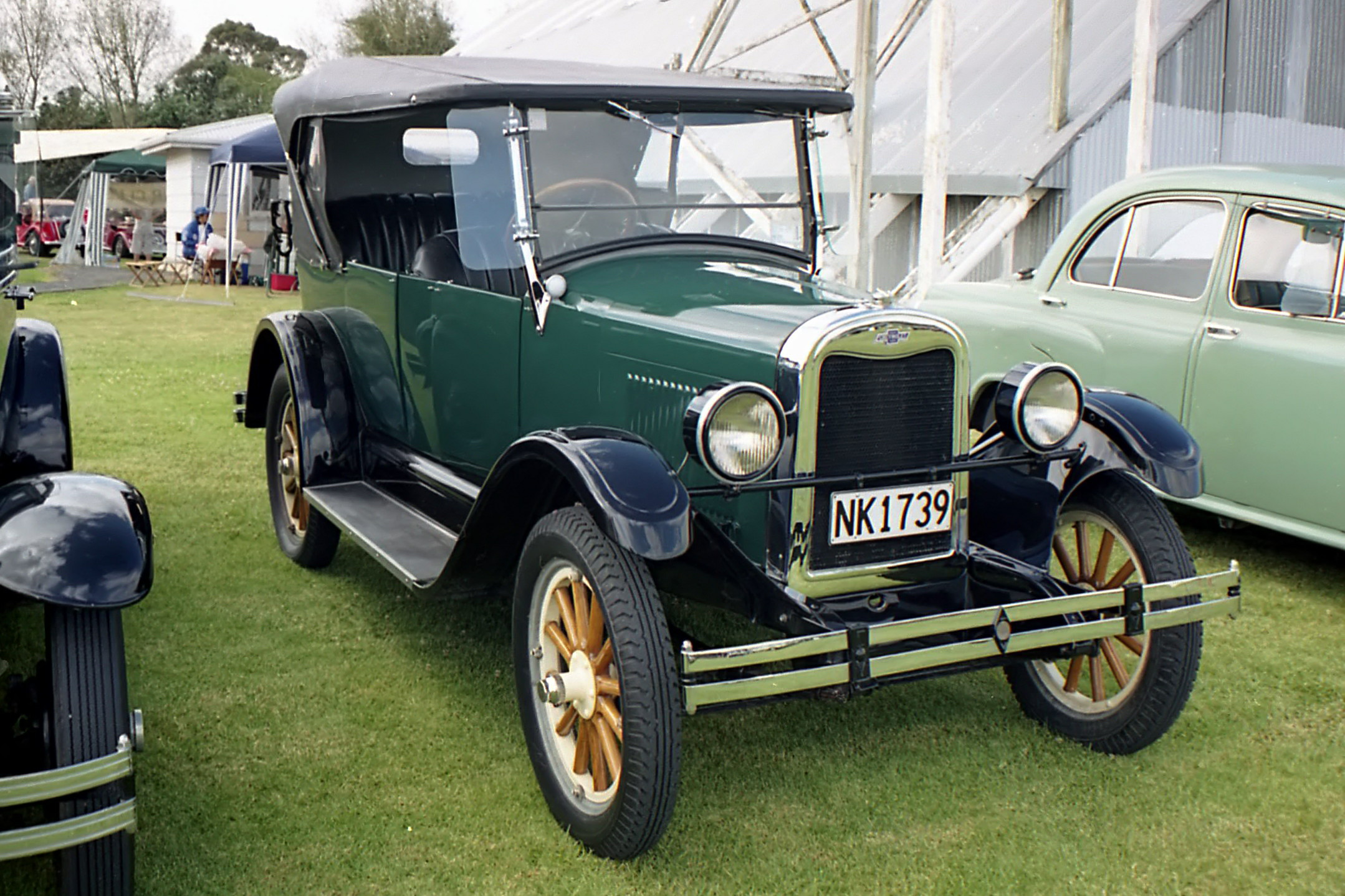
1926 Chevrolet Tourer. 1926 was the first year of New Zealand-assembled Chevrolet vehicles

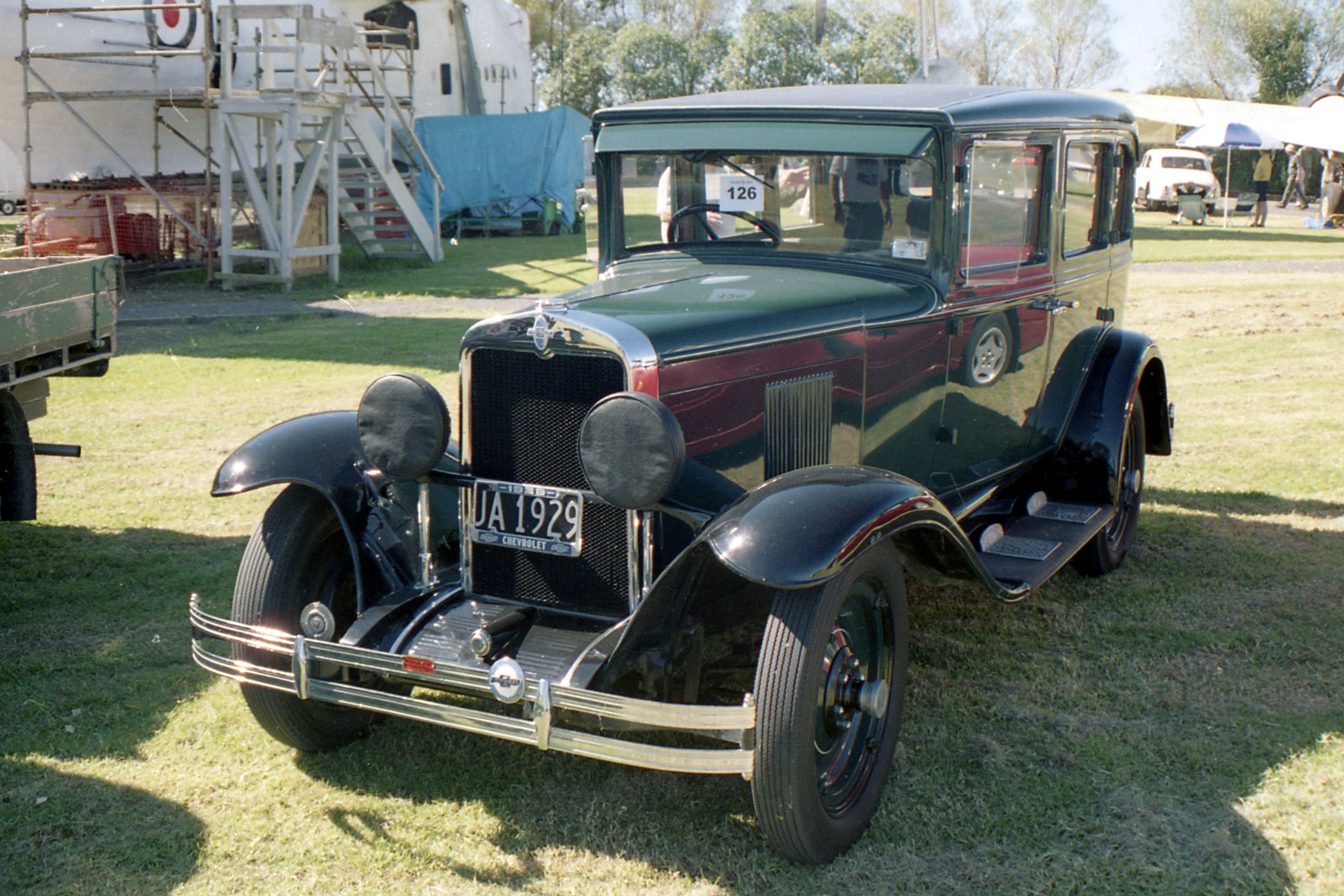
1929 Chevrolet. Built at General Motors New Zealand plant in Petone

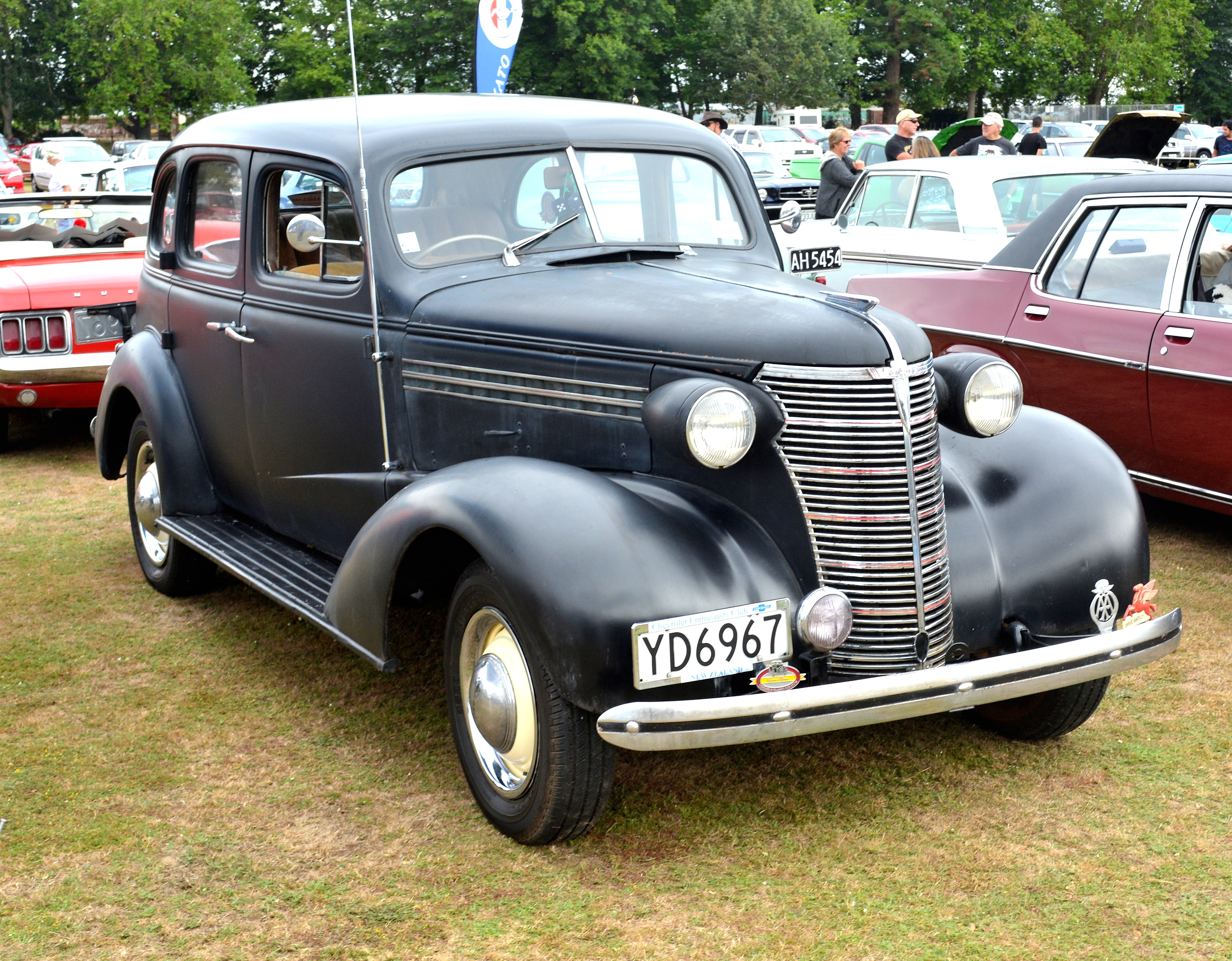
1938 Chevrolet Deluxe (New Zealand)

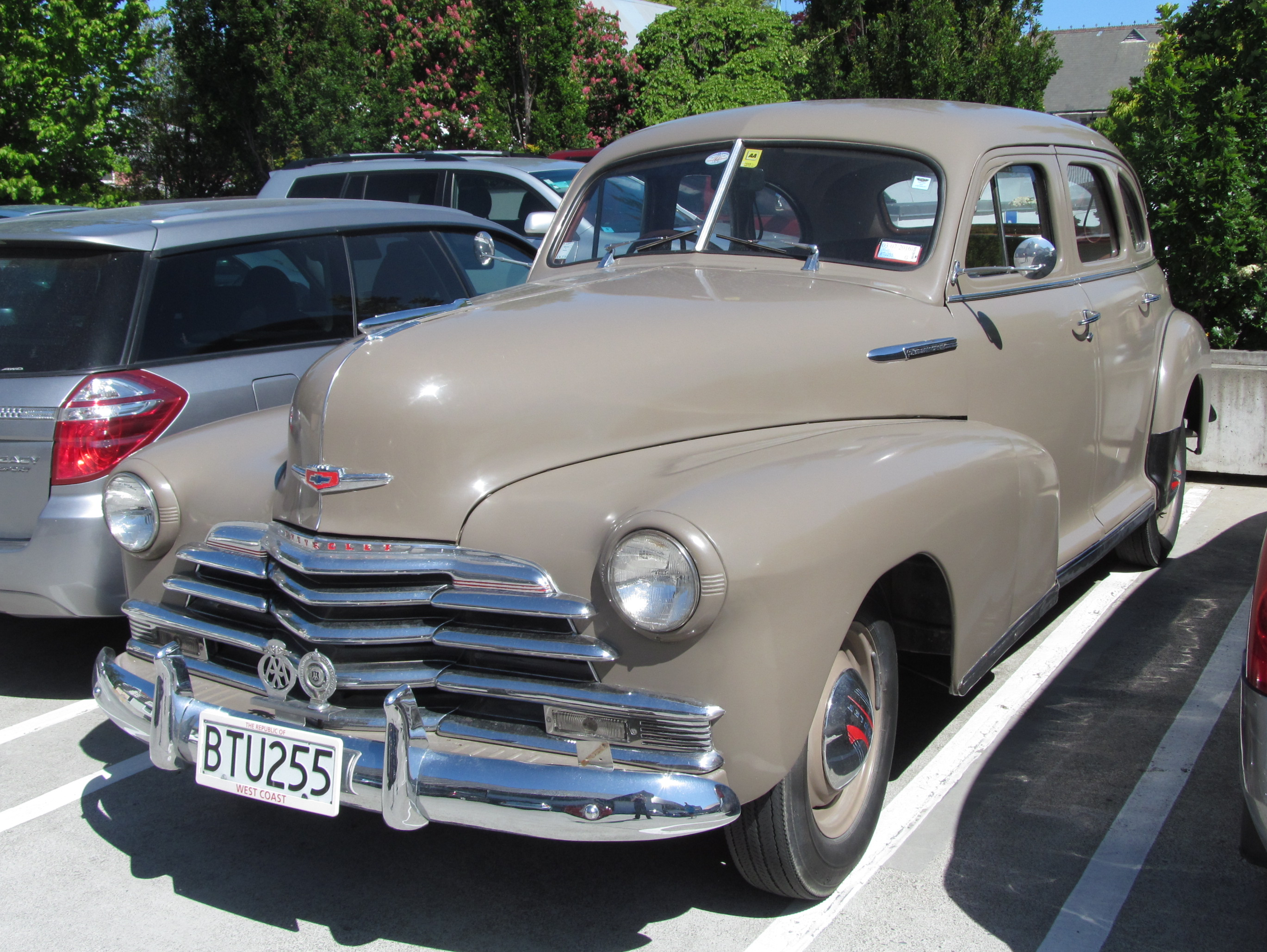
1947 Chevrolet Stylemaster Sport Sedan (New Zealand)

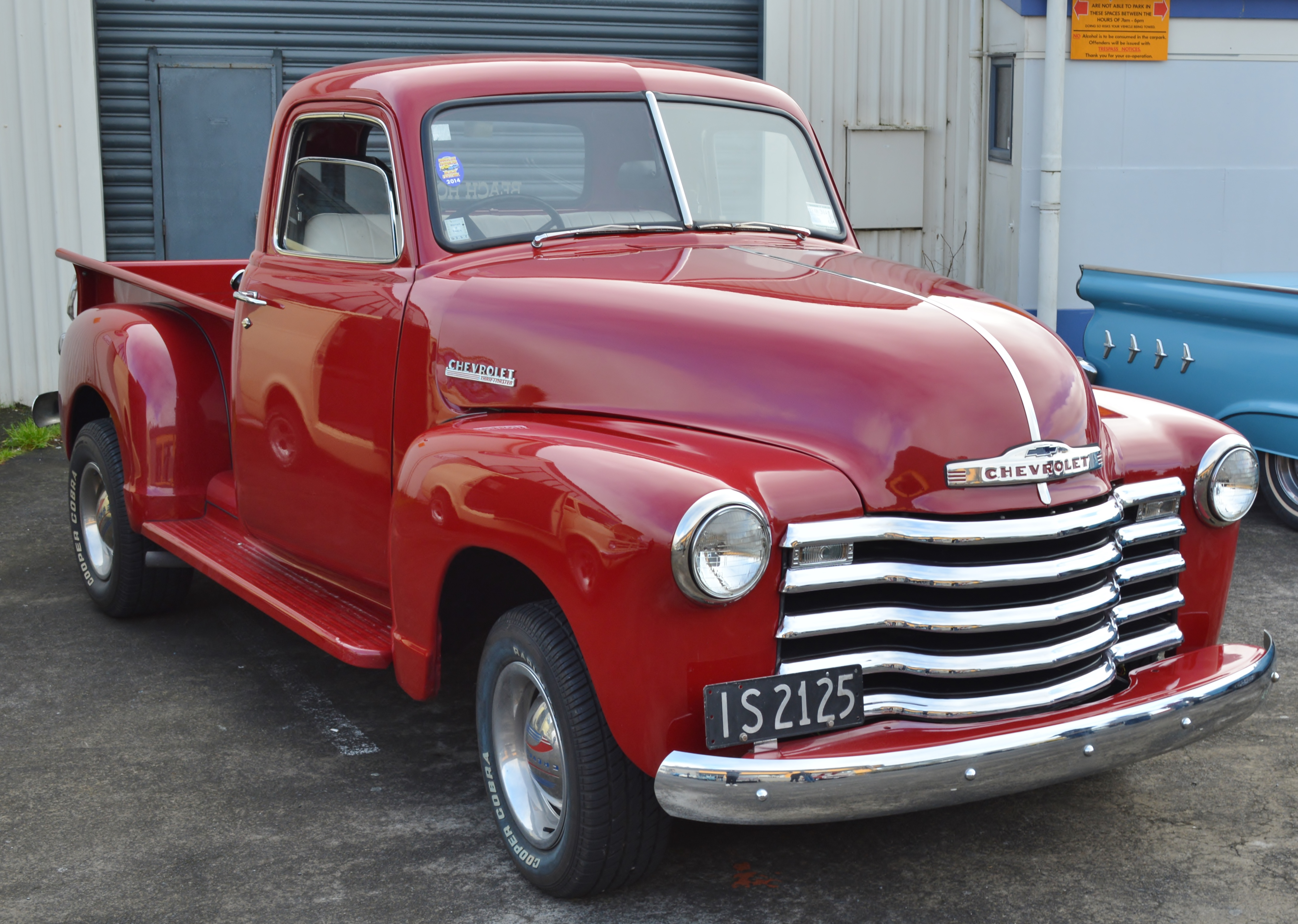
1948 Chevrolet Thriftmaster pickup truck (New Zealand)

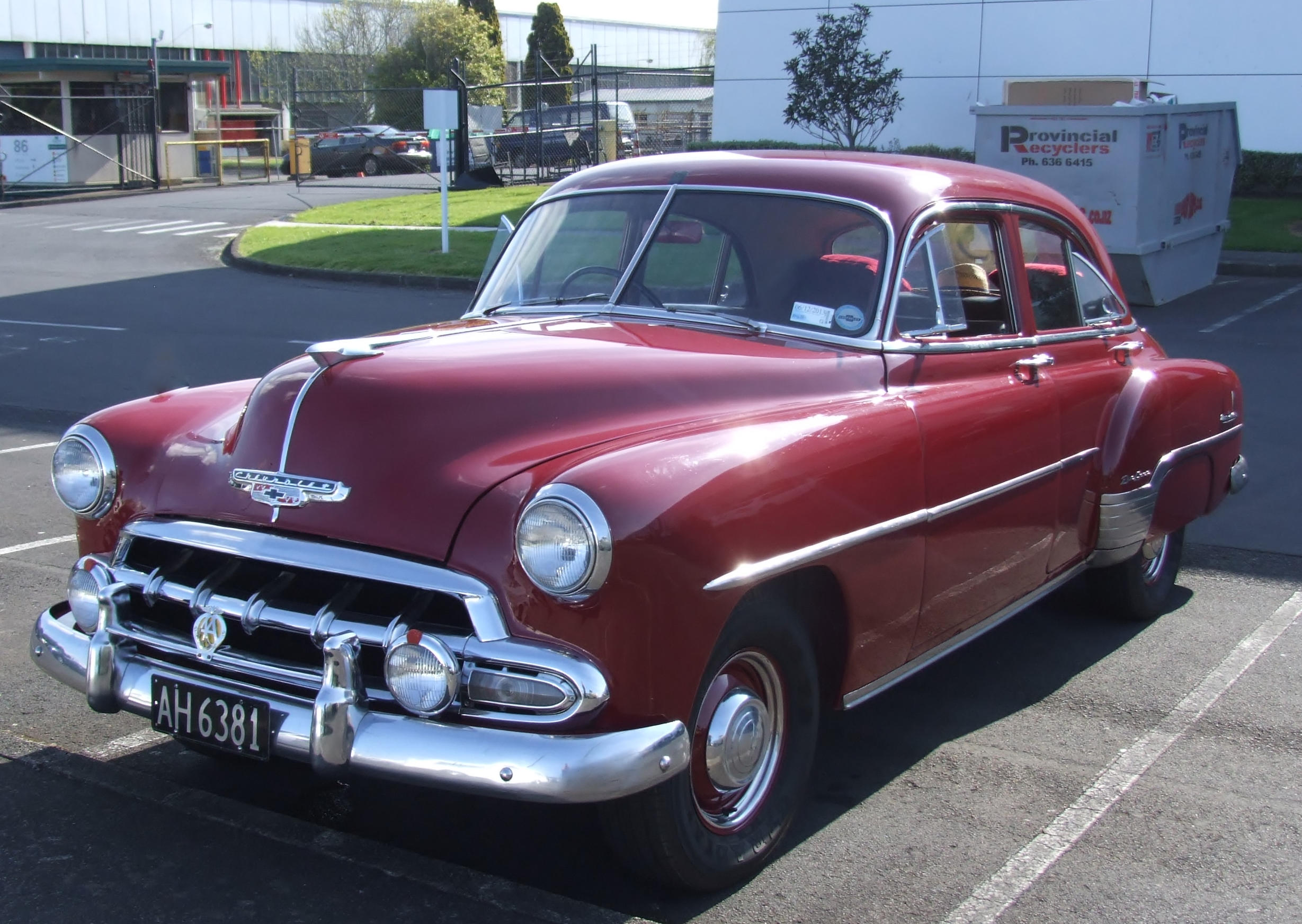
1952 Chevrolet Deluxe, assembled in New Zealand

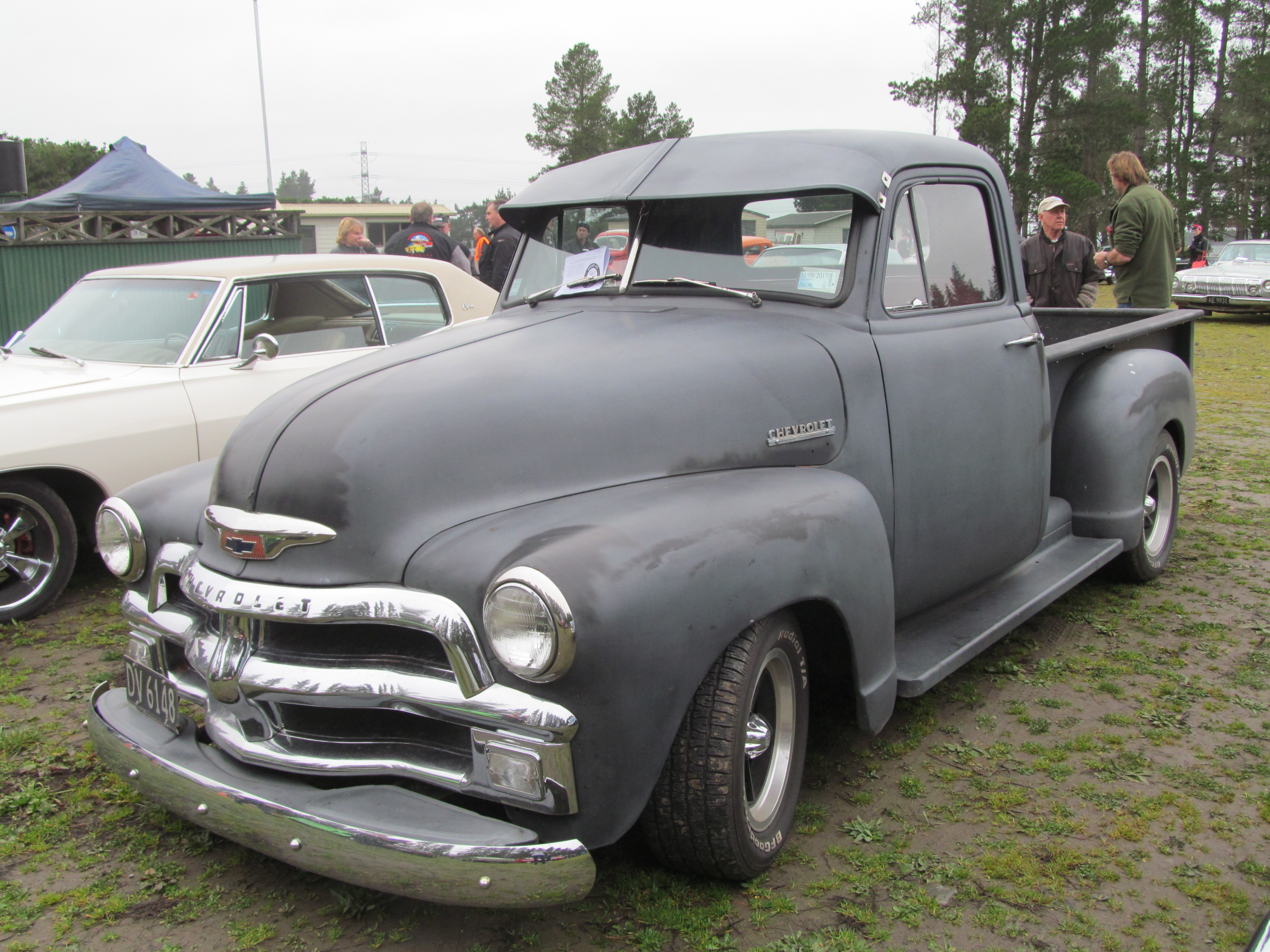
New Zealand-new 1955 (U.S 1954) Chevrolet Thriftmaster pickup

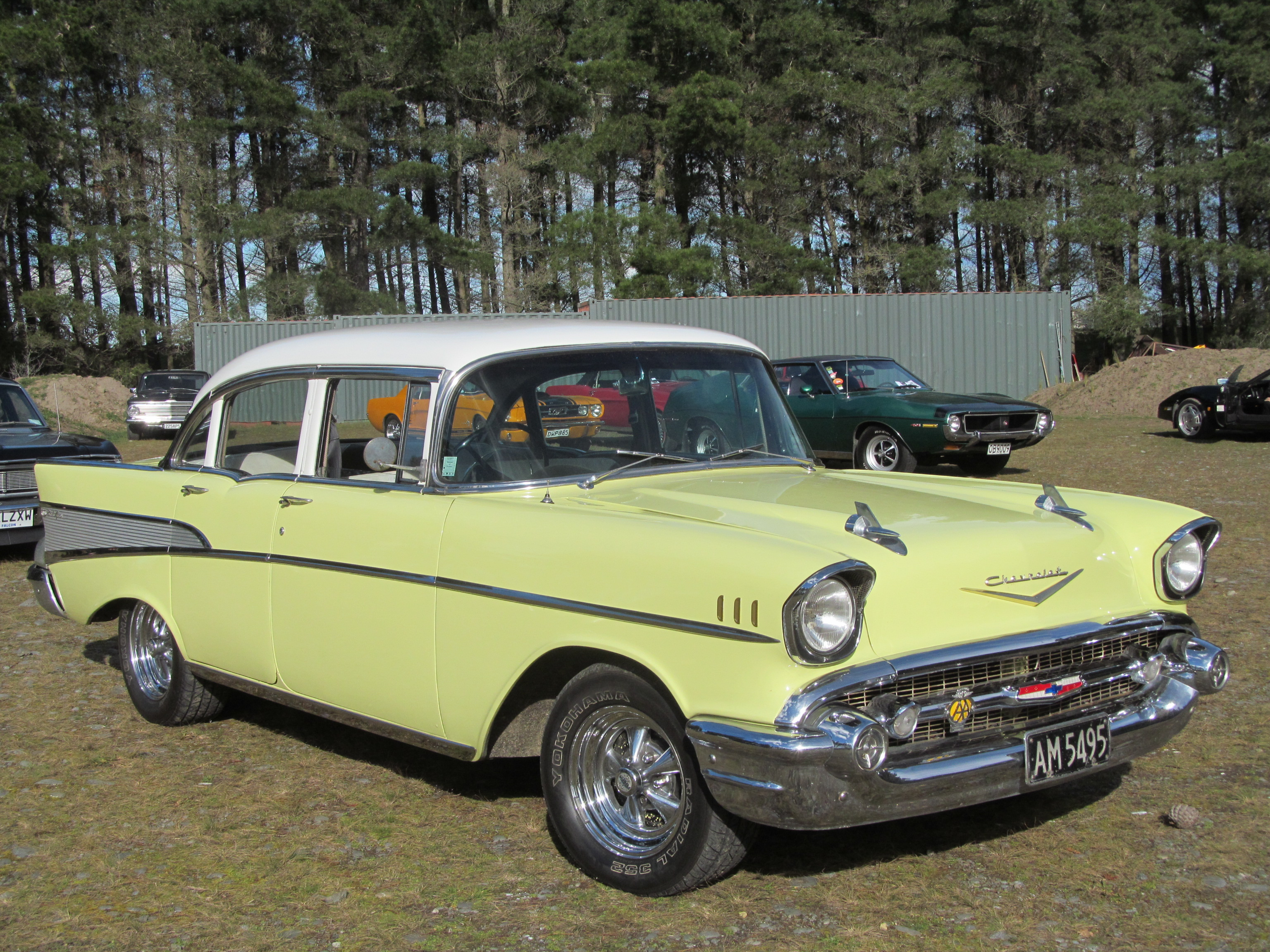
New Zealand-assembled 1957 Chevrolet Bel Air. Only 4-door sedans were assembled in New Zealand

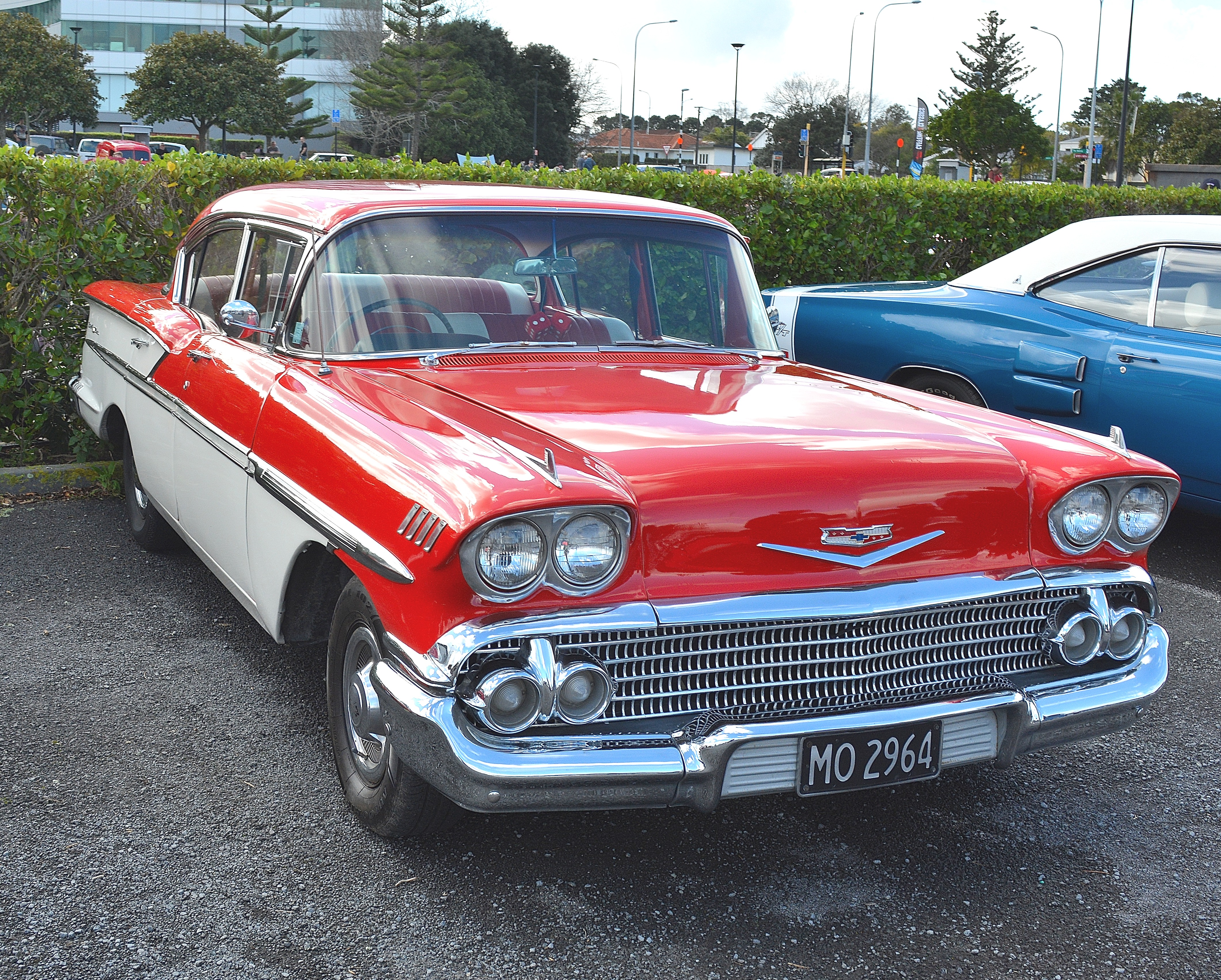
New Zealand assembled 1958 Chevrolet Bel Air 4-door sedan.

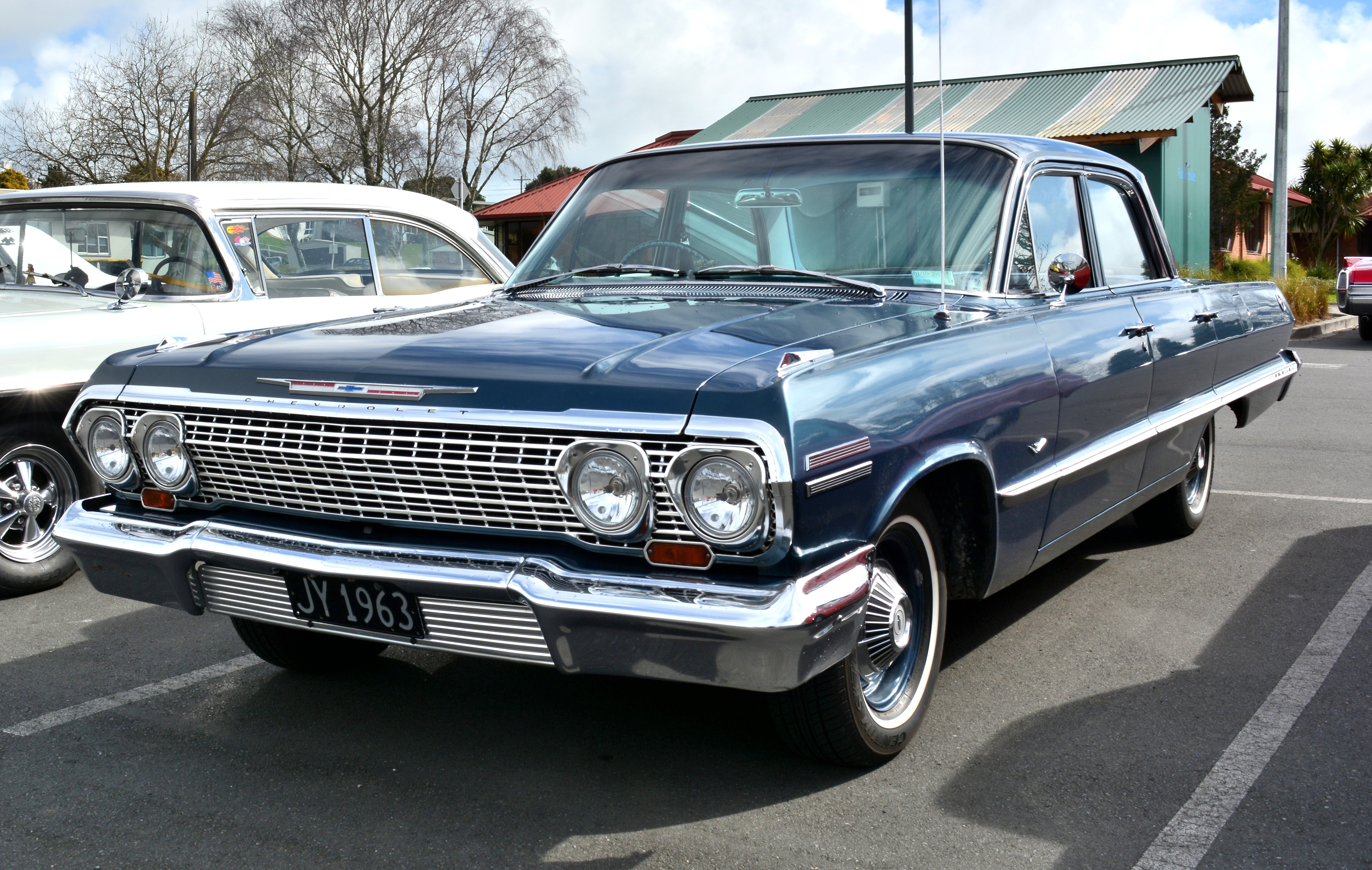
New Zealand-assembled 1963 Chevrolet Impala. Only 4-door sedans were assembled in New Zealand.

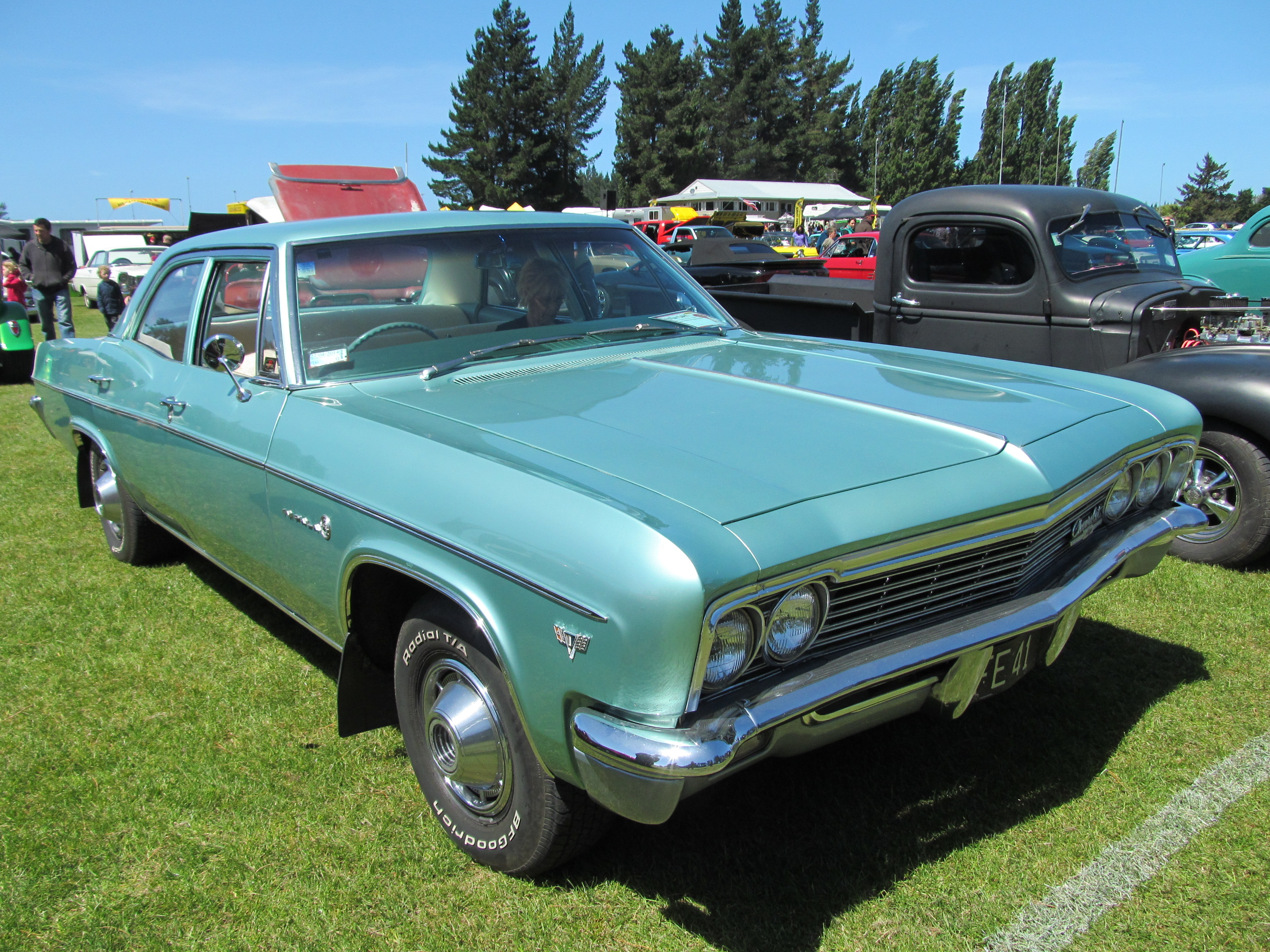
New Zealand-assembled 1966 Chevrolet Impala.

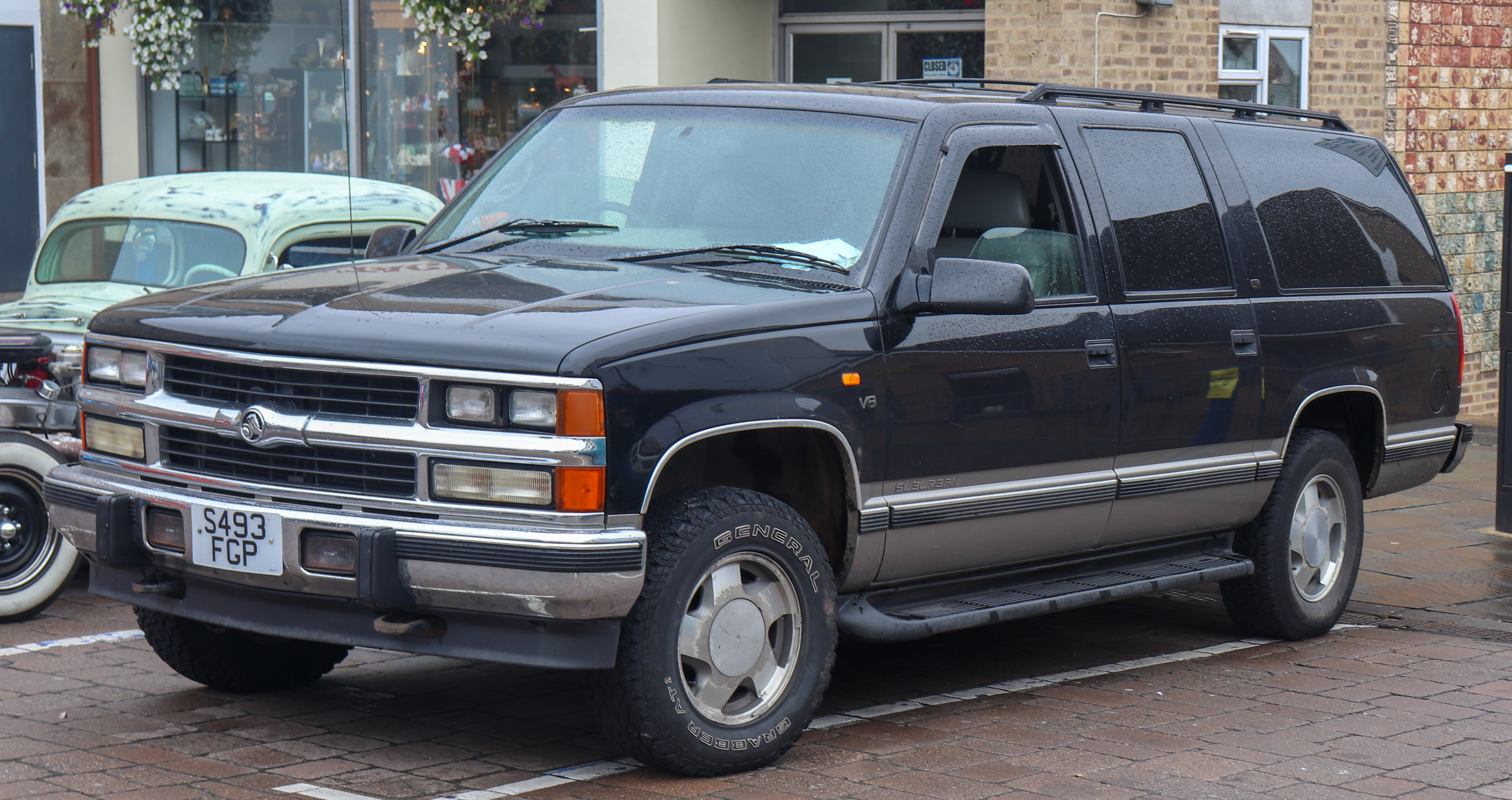
1998 Chevrolet Suburban 1500, badged in New Zealand as a "Holden."

=== Pontiac ===
Pontiac was the second marque to be assembled by General Motors New Zealand at the Petone assembly plant, with the first Pontiac vehicles coming off the line in December 1926. As with Chevrolet, Pontiacs were assembled in right-hand-drive from knock down kits, also sourced from GM's Canadian assembly plant in Oshawa, Ontario. Production was halted during World War II and did not resume after the war, although Chevrolets resumed production from 1947.

After a break of 20 years Pontiac assembly resumed from 1959 with the Petone plant manufacturing the Canadian Bel Air-based Pontiac Laurentian and Pontiac Parisienne until 1968. In Australia, General Motors-Holden assembled the Canadian Laurentian until 1963, and the Parisienne to 1968.

In General Motors review of export operations in 1968, it was decided right-hand-drive exports of Pontiac too would cease along with Chevrolet, thus effectively ending the two brands in all right-hand-drive markets internationally thereafter.

Pontiac made a single reappearance in New Zealand from 1988 to 1993 when the badge-engineered version of the Opel Kadett E-derived Daewoo LeMans, manufactured by Daewoo in South Korea, was sold in the United States and New Zealand as the Sixth-generation Pontiac LeMans.

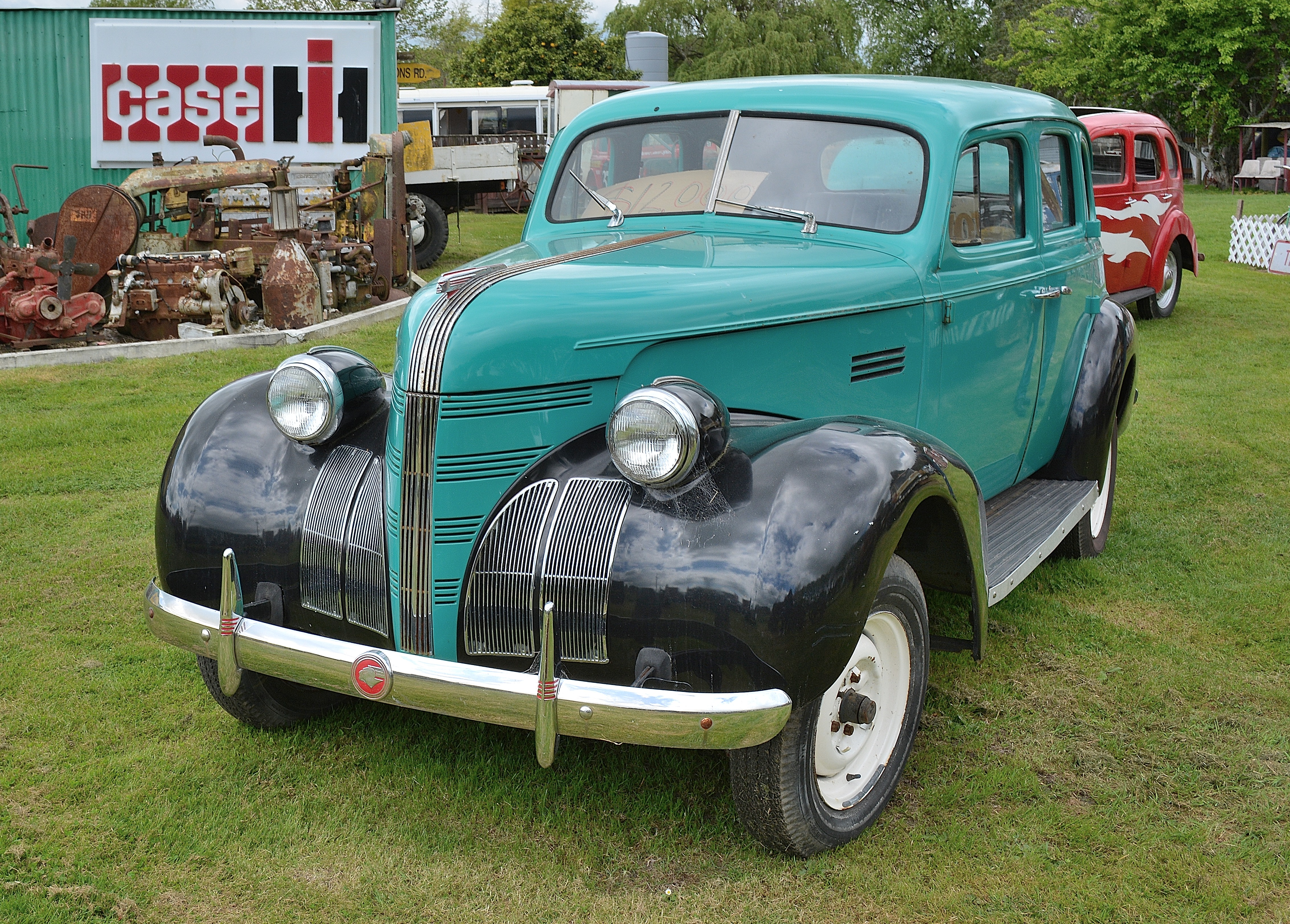
1939 Pontiac Deluxe (New Zealand)

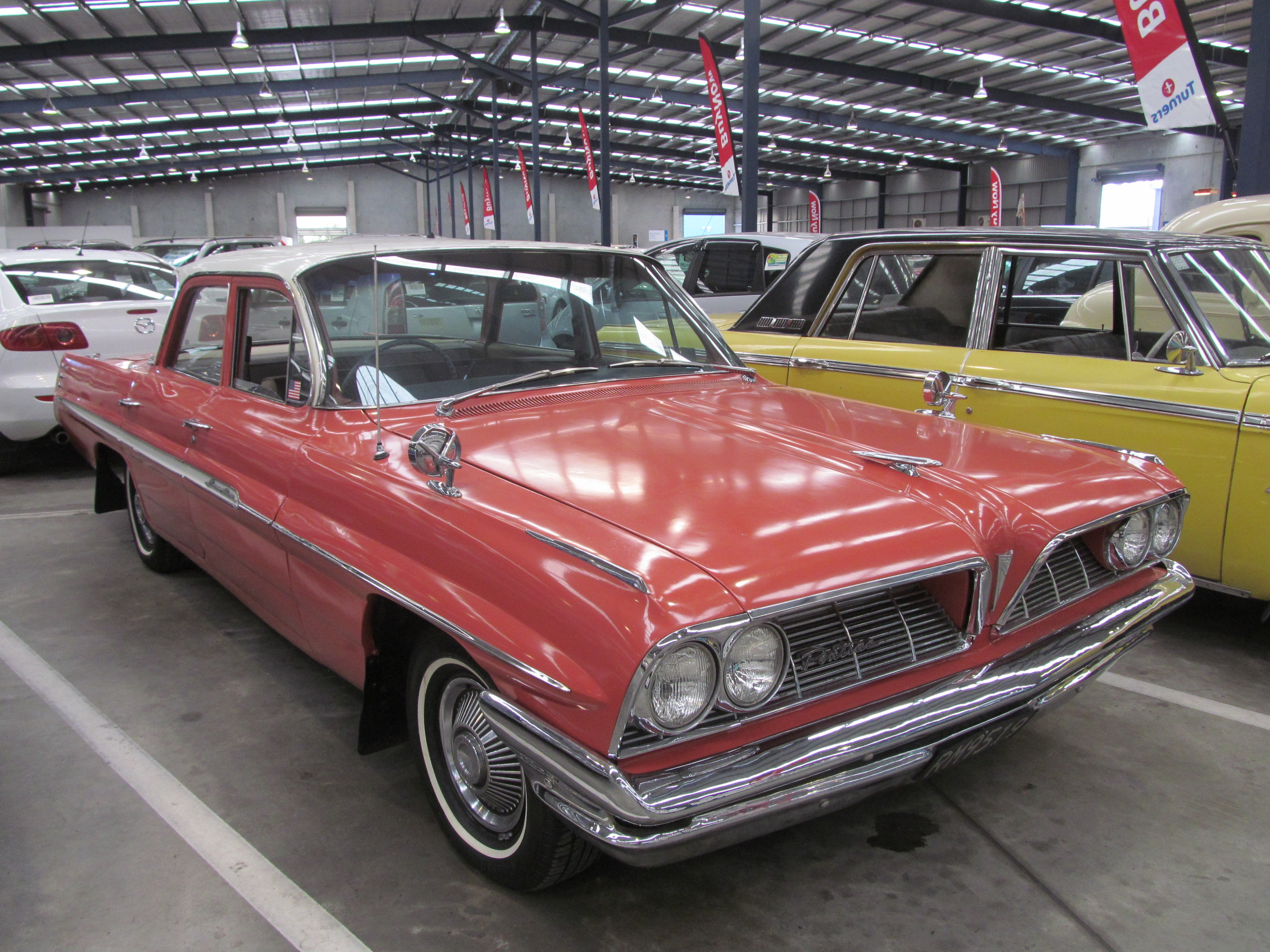
New Zealand-assembled 1961 Pontiac Laurentian

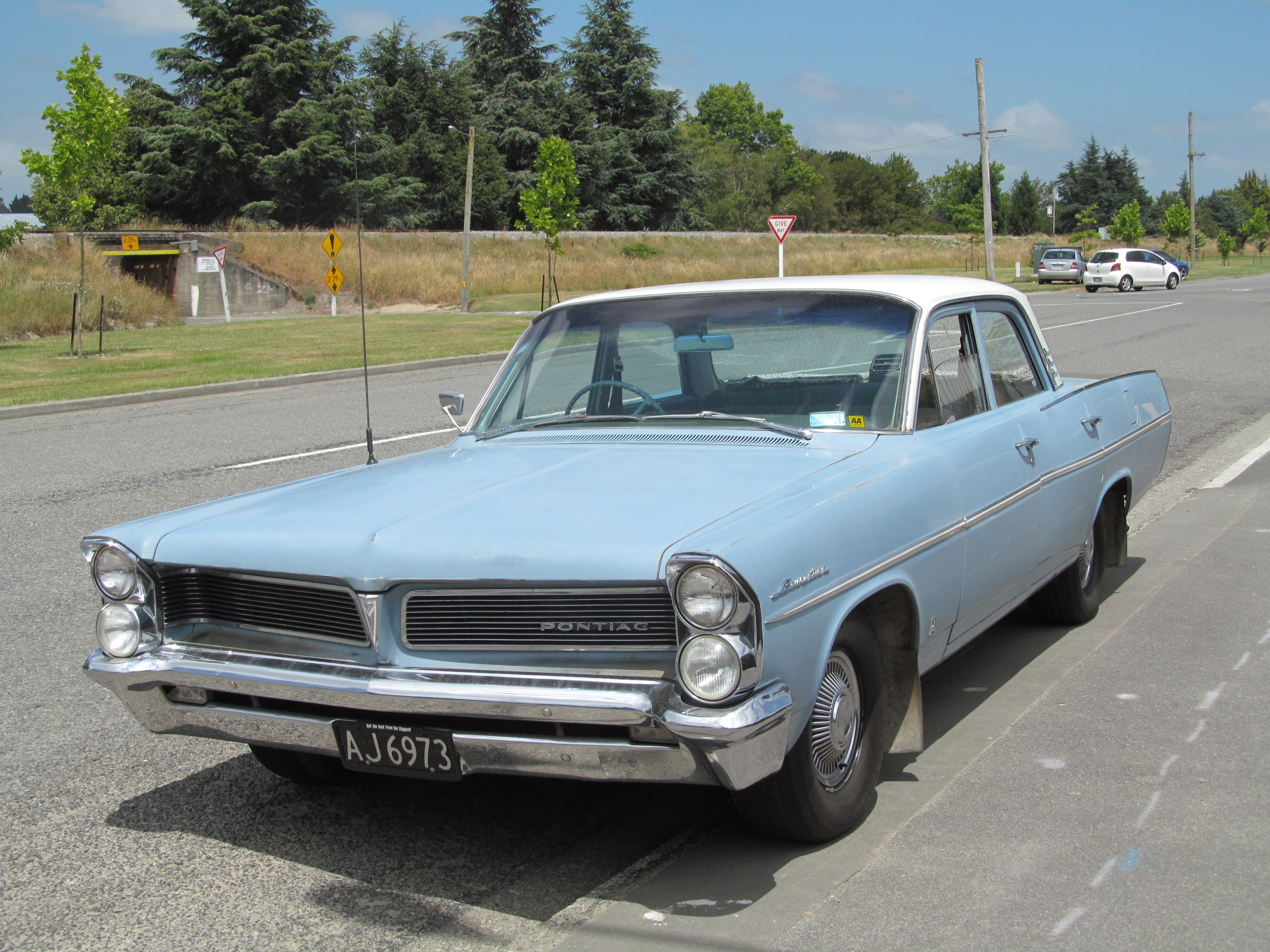
1963 Pontiac Laurentian (New Zealand)

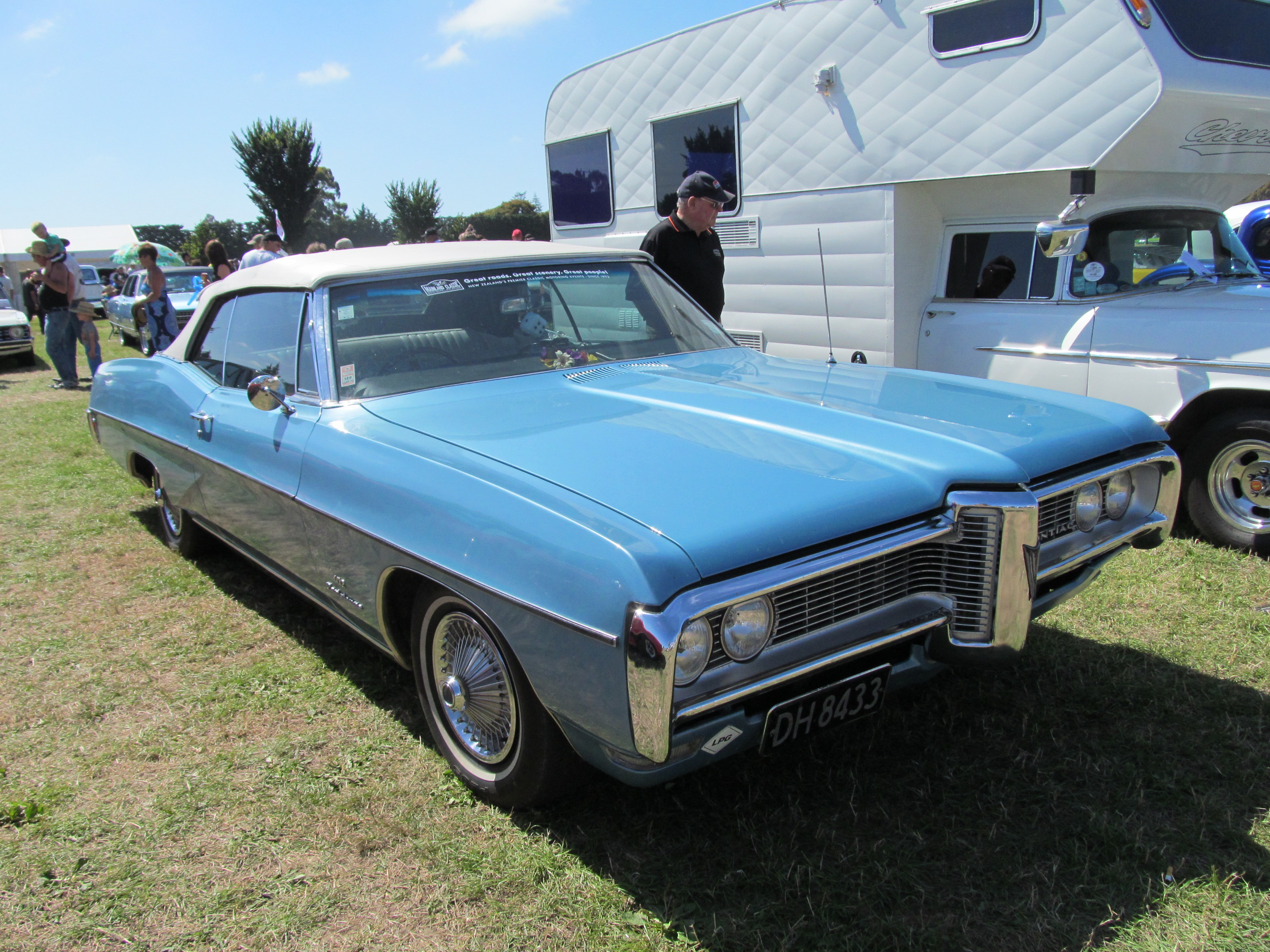
New Zealand-assembled 1968 Pontiac Parisienne

=== GMC ===
Although General Motors Truck Company (GMC) never existed as a marque in New Zealand, GMC products were sometimes privately imported as grey-imports, a large market in New Zealand.

Since the 1920s, GMC and Chevrolet trucks in the United States became largely similar, built as variants of the same platform, sharing much the same body sheetwork, except for nameplates and grilles, but with different engines. GMC advertising marketed its trucks to commercial buyers and businesses, whereas Chevrolet's advertising was directed towards private owners. GMC had no market presence in right-hand-drive truck markets, as this market was otherwise filled initially by GM's Chevrolet, and later Bedford and Isuzu brands.

During the 1970s and 1980s, most ambulances in New Zealand were Bedfords or International Harvesters. When production of the Bedford ceased in 1984, the national Ambulance Advisory Transport Board had to look for alternatives. Following world-wide investigations, the Ambulance Advisory Transport Board in 1988 came up with a shortlist of two suitable replacements: the Ford Transit and the Chevrolet C/K-GMC Sierra. The Ford proved to be unsuitable and so General Motors New Zealand imported the GMT400-platform Sierra, beginning in 1989, exclusively for ambulance use. They were converted to right-hand-drive in New Zealand. Although the "Sierra" name applied to the GMC variant in the United States, it was called "Chevrolet Sierra" in New Zealand and was badged as a Chevrolet. (Australia similarly imported the Sierra for ambulance use during the 1990s although they retained their GMC badging and were called GMC 2500.) Sierras served as ambulances for the St John Ambulance Service throughout the 1990s. The GMC Vandura was also imported and converted to right-hand-drive for the Wellington Free Ambulance and St Johns Ambulance Service, and saw service during the 1990s and 2000s. As with the Sierra, the Vandura was badged as "Chevrolet."

When the C/K was replaced in the United States by the first-generation Chevrolet Silverado (second-generation GMC Sierra) in 1998, subsequent imports were badged as the "Chevrolet Silverado." The Silverado saw use right through the 2000s. Since the 2010s the Mercedes-Benz Sprinter and Ford Transit have been the main vehicles used for ambulances, and more recently the Fiat Ducato, with bodies built in New Zealand. Some Sierras, Vanduras, and Silverados are still in use with private EMS services such as Medimax, TransitCare, and Horizons Healthcare.

With Holden Australia ending local manufacturing in 2017, Holden turned to the wider GM portfolio for future products, including the United States. Being a left-hand-drive market General Motors in the United States had traditionally never produced GMC-branded right-hand-drive vehicles. Consequently, General Motors developed their first factory-right-hand-drive model, the second-generation GMC Acadia which was introduced to the Australian and New Zealand markets wearing "Holden" badges in November 2018. Built at GMC's Spring Hill Manufacturing plant in Tennessee, it was the only RHD model to be made by GMC in the United States, and was exclusively manufactured for the Australasian market.

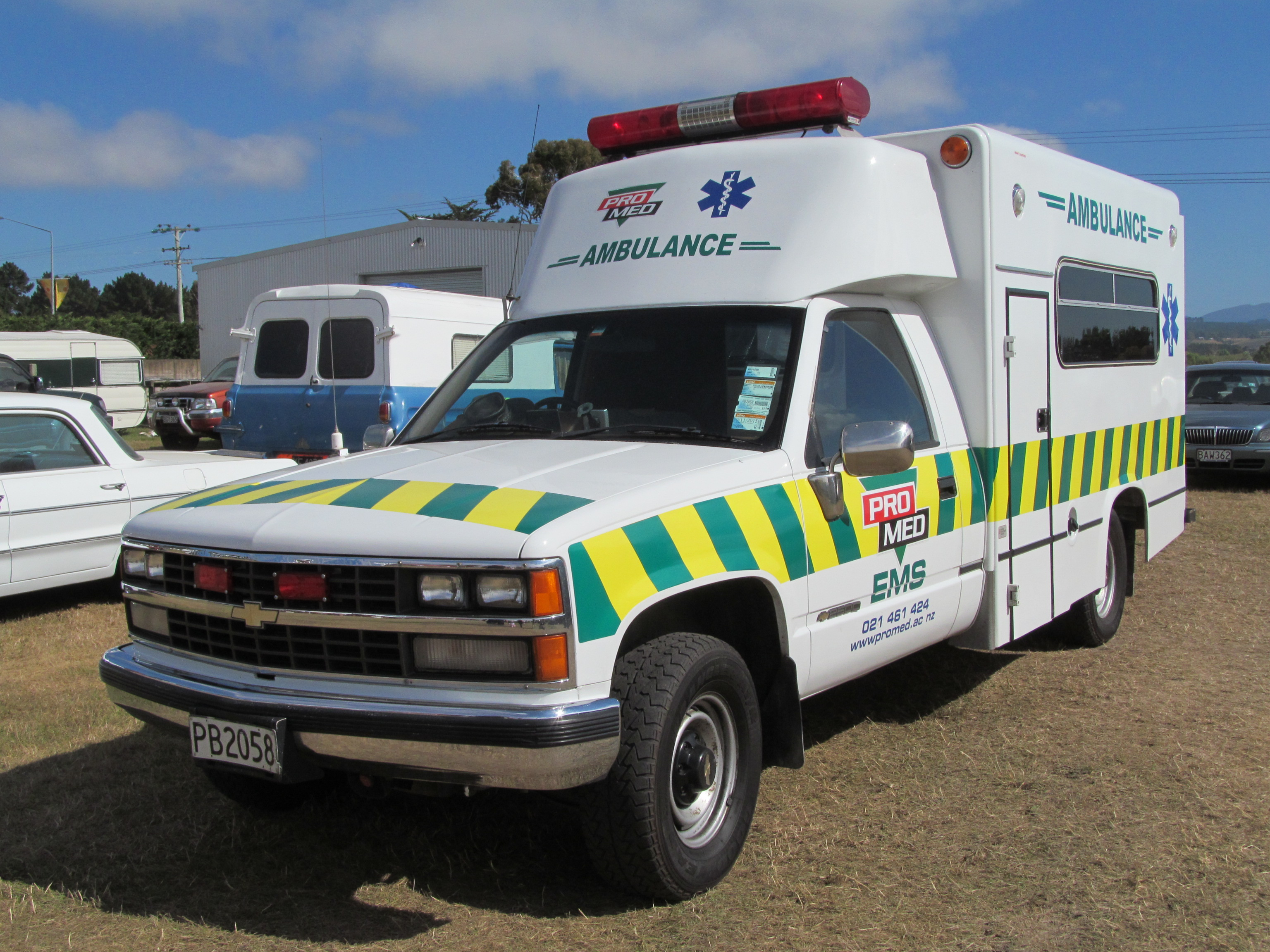
1990 Chevrolet Sierra ambulance. In use by a private EMS service (New Zealand)

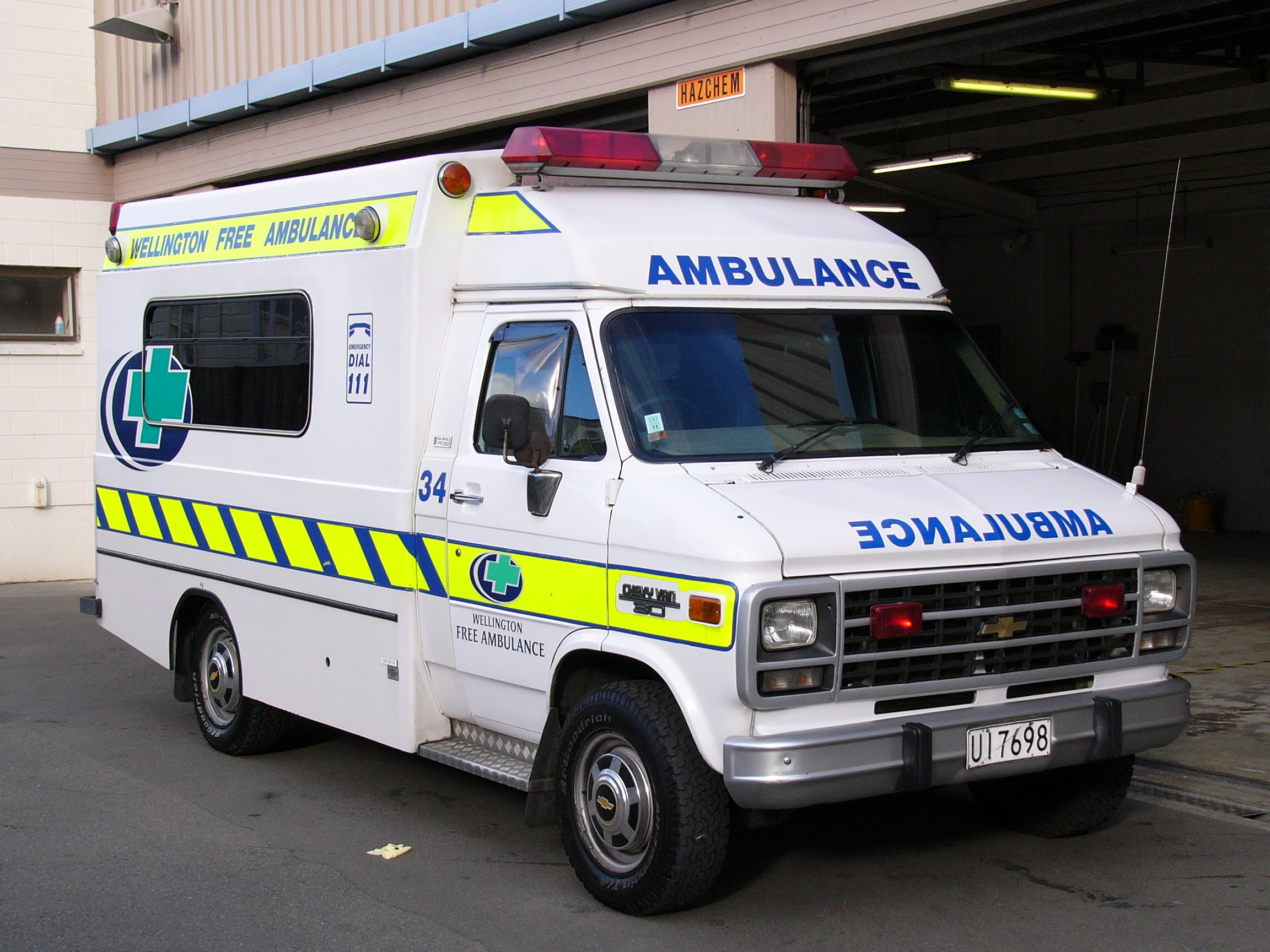
GMC Vandura ("Chevrolet" in NZ) Wellington Free Ambulance (New Zealand)

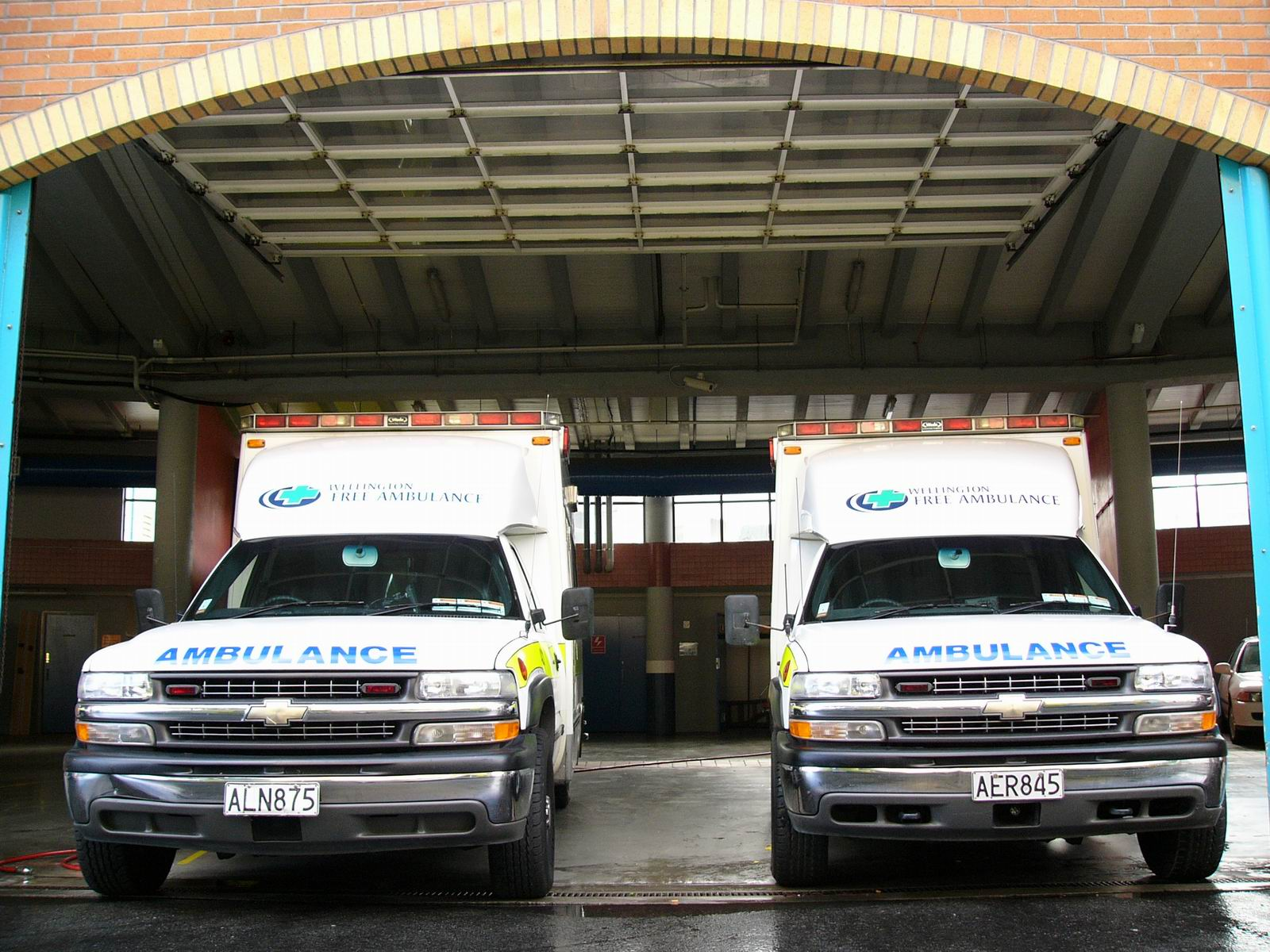
2001 Chevrolet Silverado (GMC 2500) ambulances, Wellington Free Ambulance (New Zealand)

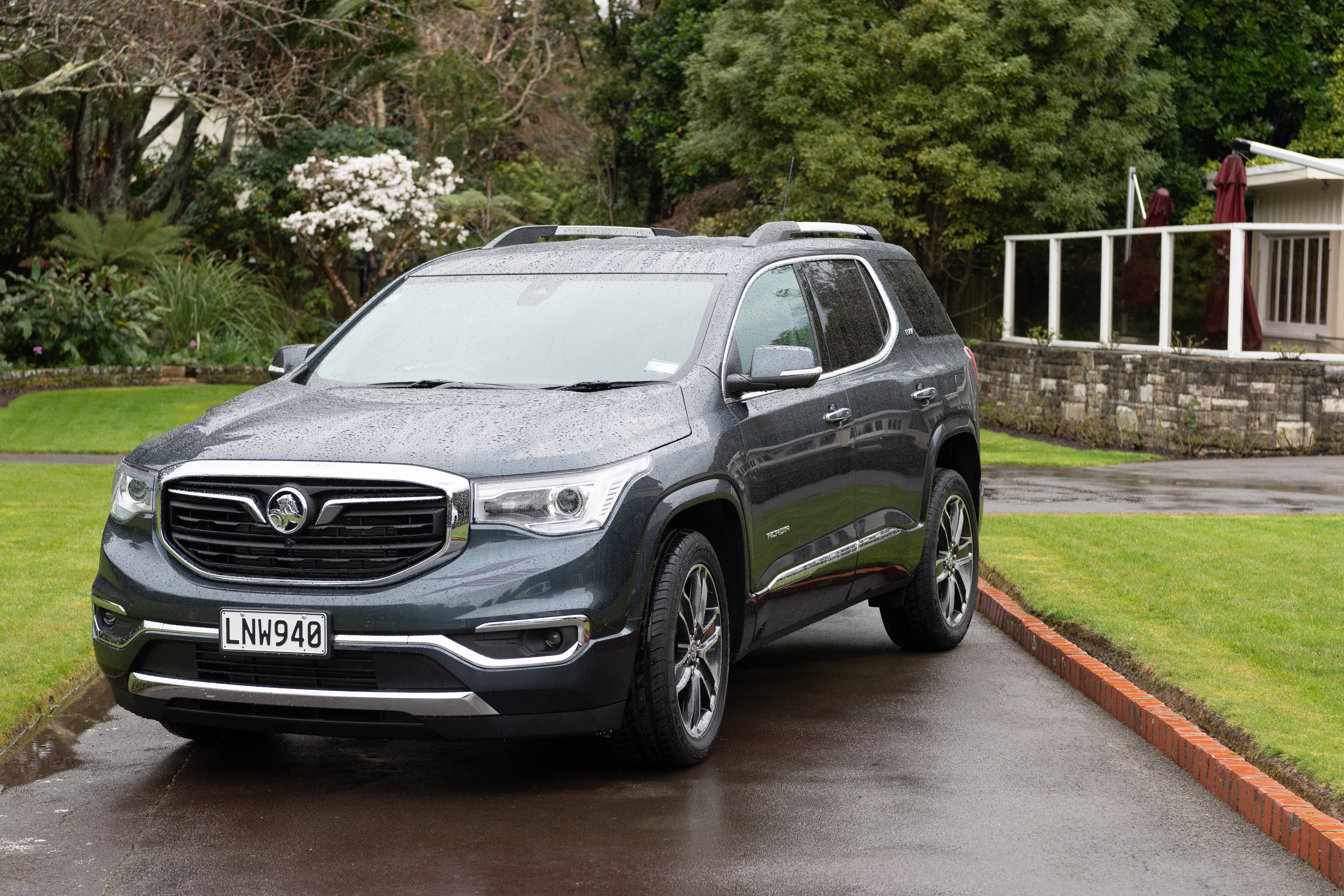
Factory right-hand-drive "Holden" Acadia. Built in USA. Launched in New Zealand on 29 August 2018

=== Buick/Oldsmobile/Cadillac ===
Buick and Oldsmobile automobiles were brought in to New Zealand by various automotive importers from the onset of the 20th century and throughout the 1920s until the formation of General Motors New Zealand. Both brands were locally assembled at the GMNZ Petone plant, with Buick from January 1927, and Oldsmobile from 1928. A snapshot of the automotive industry in 1933 shows that 86% of vehicles on New Zealand roads were American and 7% of those were Buick. Cadillac vehicles were bought in, in limited numbers and at limited times. Knock-down kits were sourced from Canada.

Outside of General Motors New Zealand, Newmans Coach Lines in Nelson (and other local competitors) used Cadillacs for passenger services (called "service cars") during the 1930s. The Cadillac 353E was the most common model. These were brought in, often second hand, from the United States, and were stretched and rebodied in New Zealand by motor body builders Crawley Ridley in Wellington. Some of these original 1930s models remained in service with various North Island and South Island passenger services into the 1950s.

In 2008 General Motors planned to introduce the Cadillac brand to Australia and New Zealand but the plan was canned at the eleventh hour. 88 of 89 factory-right-hand-drive Cadillac CTS cars which had already arrived in Australia for the release were instead sold in May 2009 to New Zealand Holden dealership Ebbett Group for sale in New Zealand. All were sold with a three-year, 100,000 km warranty. In January 2010 Ebbett imported a further 71 vehicles that had been built for the UK market and these were sold in New Zealand on similar terms. The Ebbett Group which sells multiple car brands, is now the sole distributor for Cadillac in New Zealand.

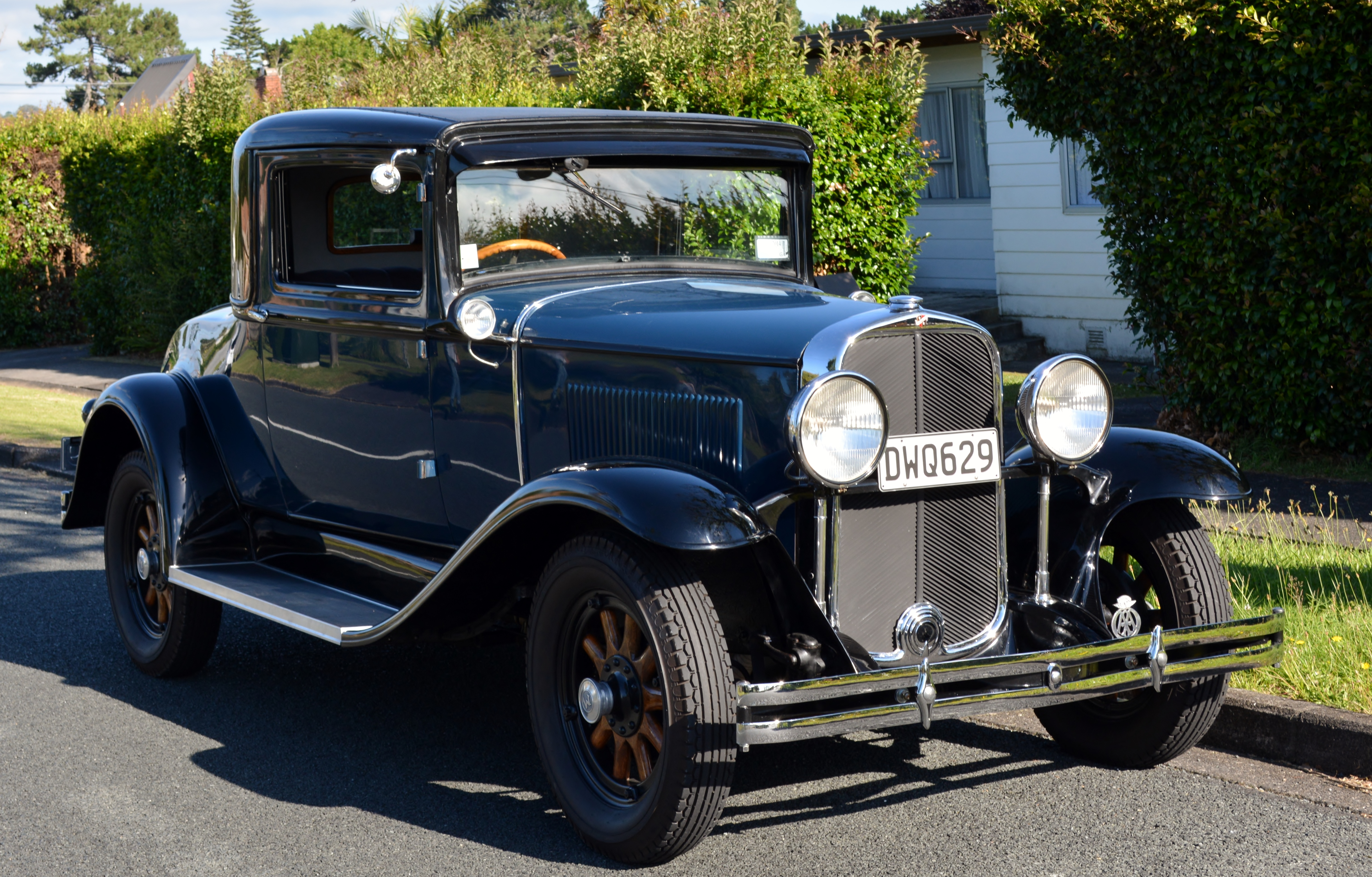
1930 Buick Marquette (New Zealand)

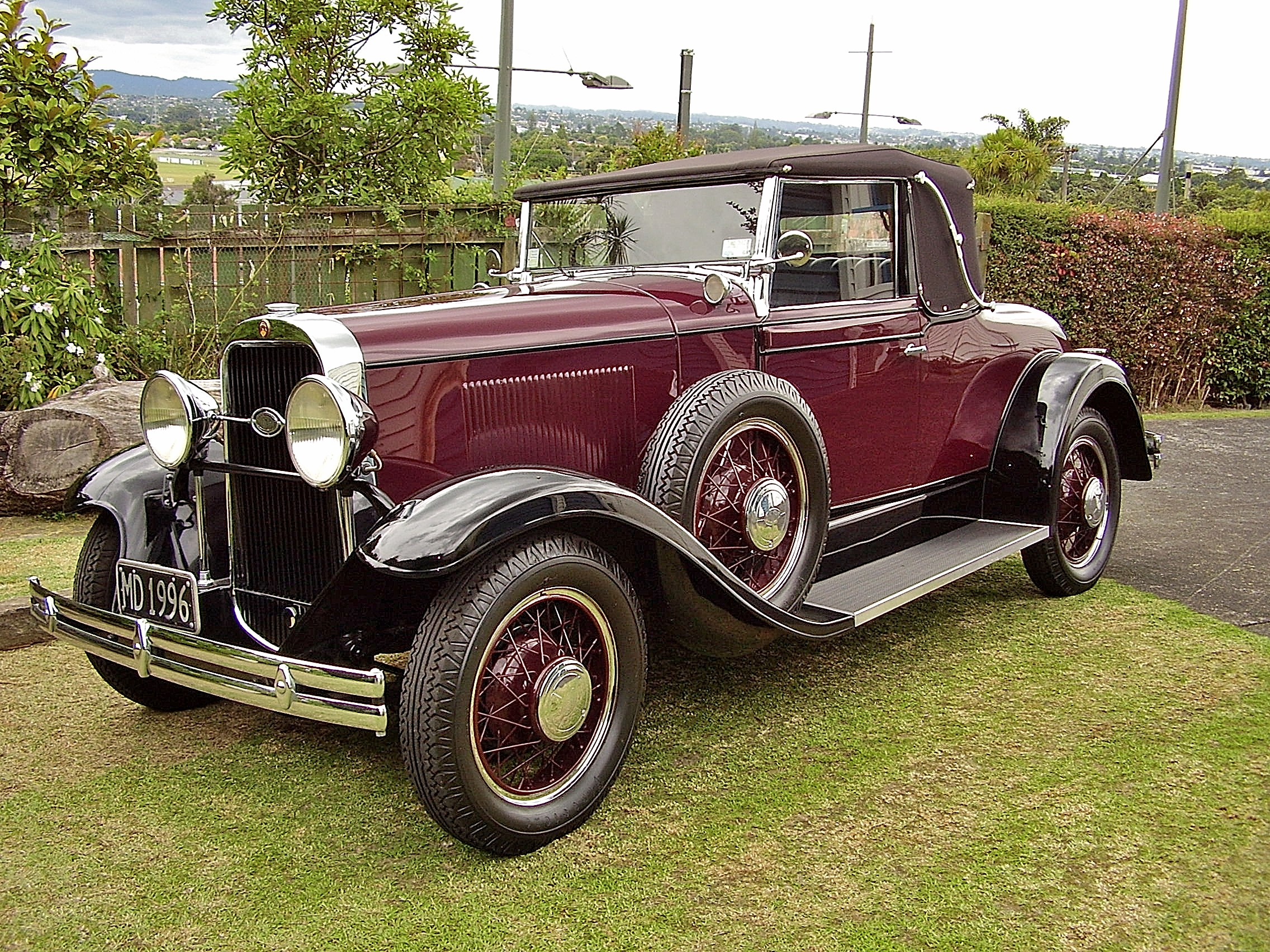
1930 Oldsmobile Roadster convertible (New Zealand)

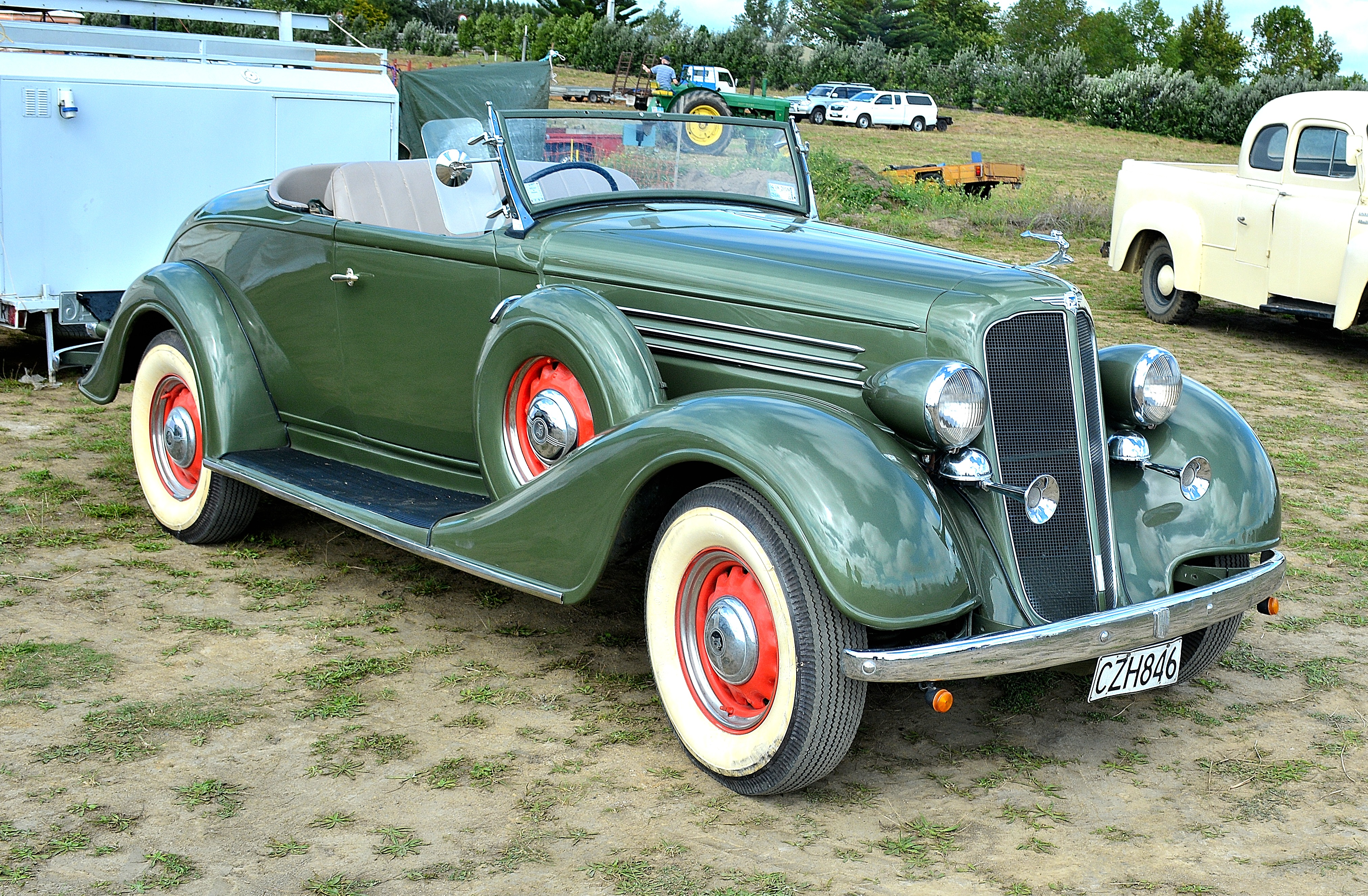
1934 Buick Straight 8 (New Zealand)

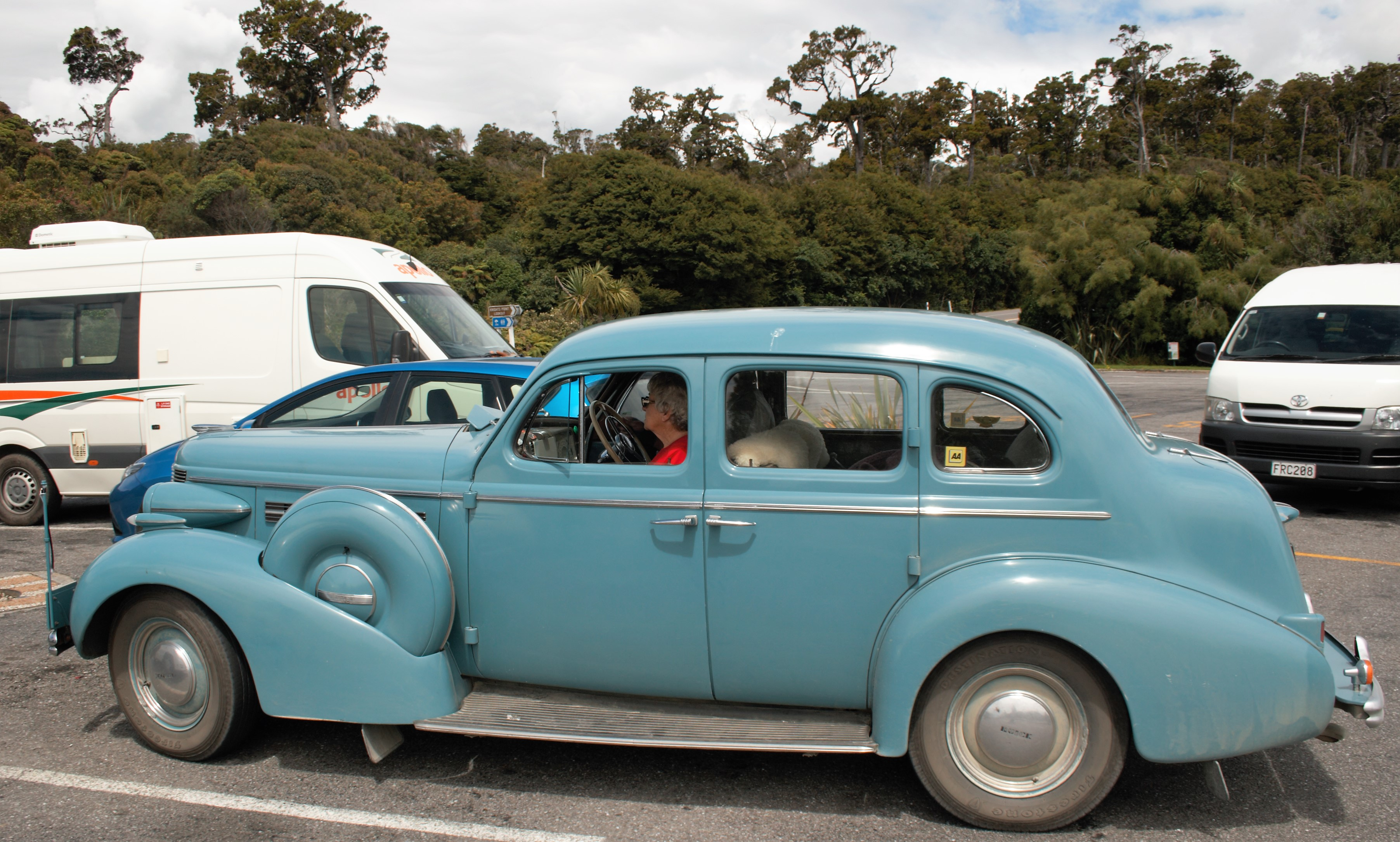
1937 Buick sedan (New Zealand)

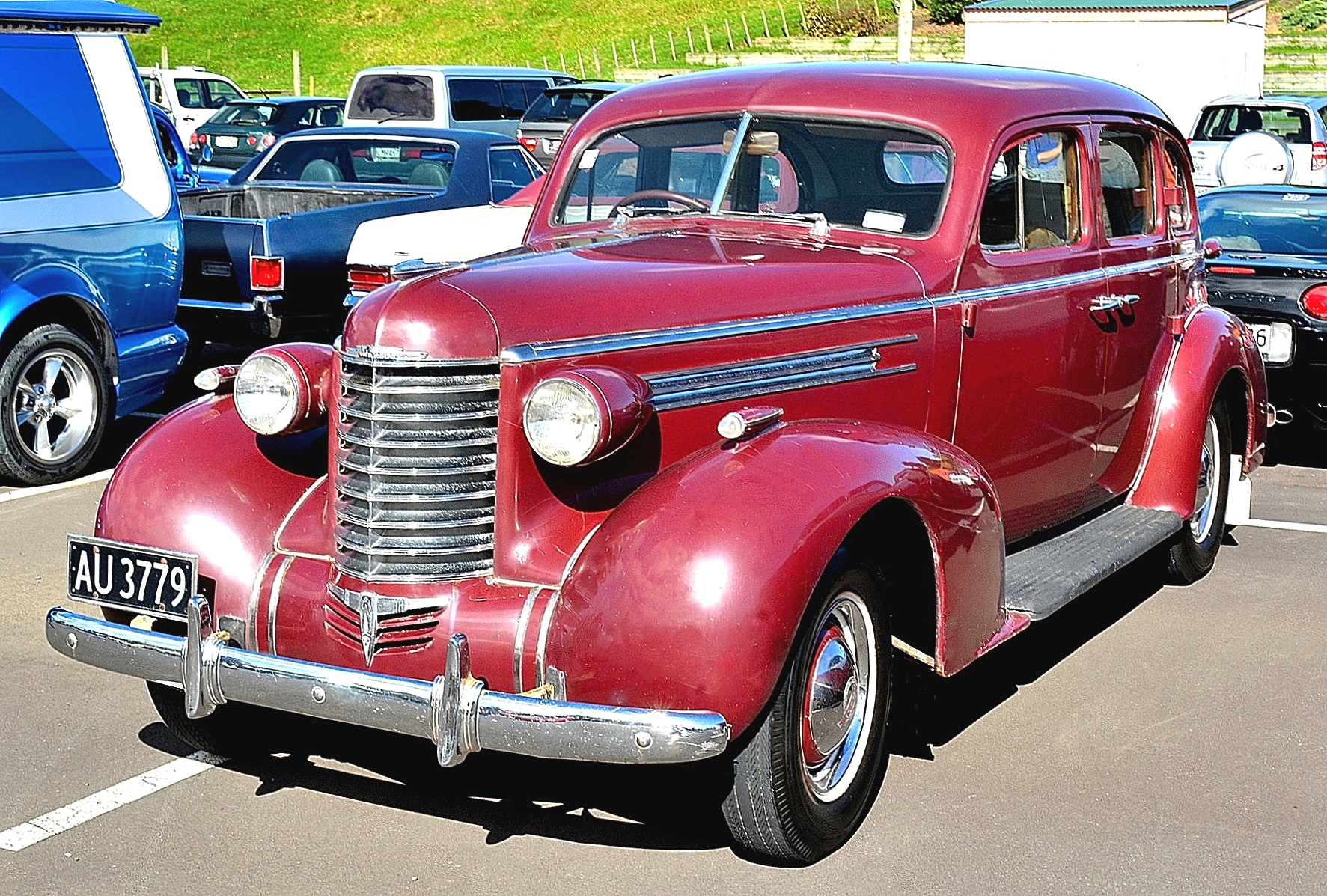
1937 Oldsmobile 2-door coupe (New Zealand)

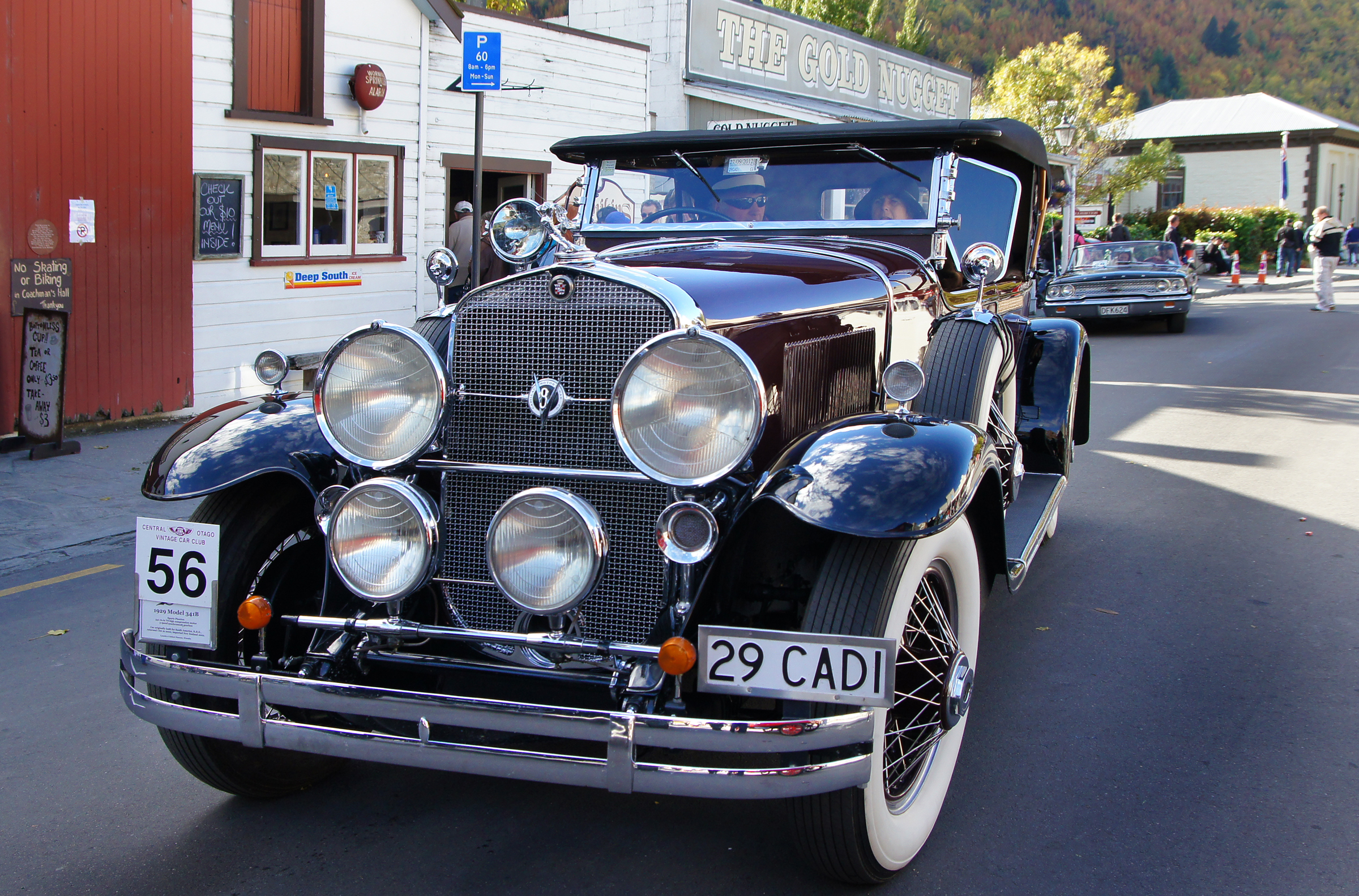
1929 Cadillac (New Zealand)

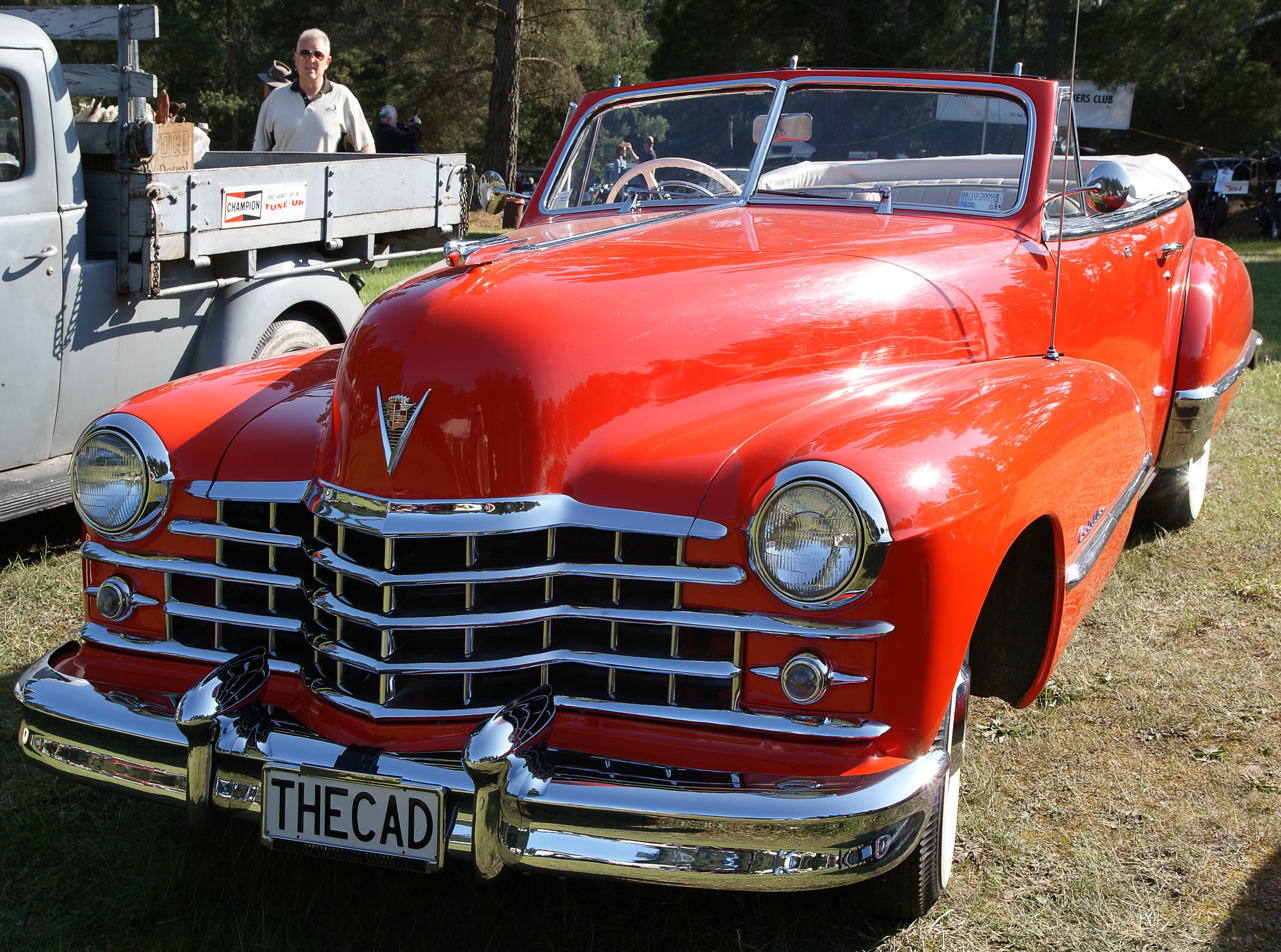
1947 Cadillac convertible (New Zealand)

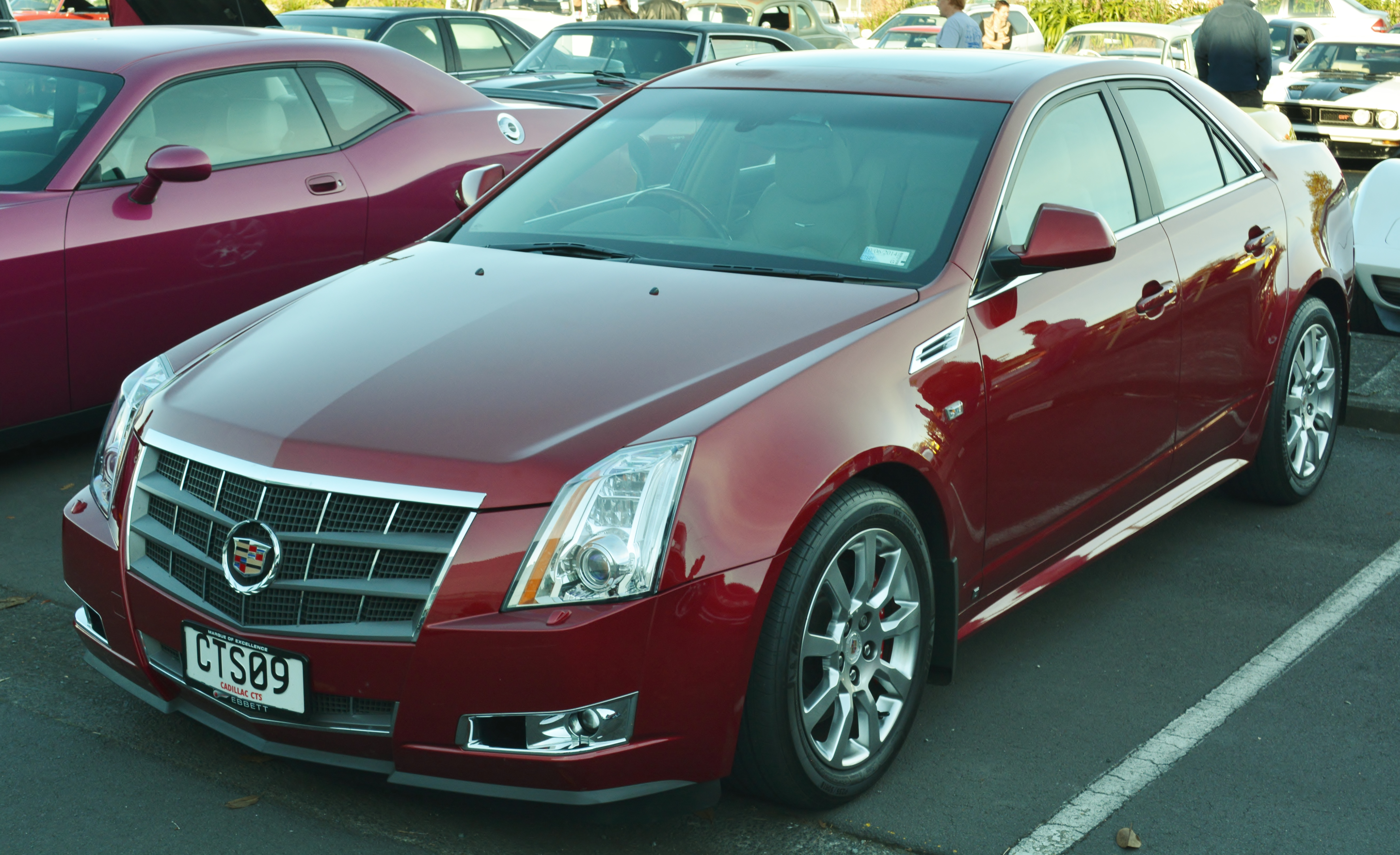
1 of 88 Cadillac CTS sedans sold in New Zealand following the failed launch of the brand in Australia in 2008

=== Vauxhall ===
Following General Motors' purchase of Vauxhall in 1925, General Motors New Zealand added British Vauxhalls to their production line, beginning in 1931. The Petone plant began with the Vauxhall Cadet. After World War II the plant assembled the Velox, and Wyvern and, between 1955 and 1960, the Cresta. 1957 saw the arrival of the Vauxhall Victor and in 1964, the Vauxhall Viva. The Vauxhall Cresta was then fully imported from Britain until 1965 and the PC Cresta Standard in 1966 replaced the locally-built PB Velox after the Velox nameplate was discontinued by Vauxhall in the United Kingdom in 1965. From early 1966 the Cresta was locally built at the Petone plant and, from late 1967 at Trentham, and remained largely unchanged until production end. The top-of-the-line Cresta was a rare import only model named "Viscount" and came standard with power steering, electric windows, reclining seats, a vinyl roof, walnut dashboard, inertia reel seat belts front, and heated rear window. The final 1971 facelifted UK model did not make it to New Zealand.

Victor sedans were assembled at the Petone plant with variations from their UK and Australian counterparts, and saw extensive use as government fleet vehicles. Although rare, wagons were fully imported. Victors were dropped in New Zealand before the final UK model series was released in 1972. The last New Zealand-assembled Victors were fitted with Holden gearboxes.

While the 1967–1969 HB Viva was assembled and sold in New Zealand as a Vauxhall, in neighbouring Australia the HB was marketed as the Holden Torana, which would become further developed and built in Australia over three generations. HB Torana SL sedans were imported from Australia to give Holden dealers a small car to sell in competition with the separate Vauxhall-Chevrolet dealer chain but this was short-lived and the updated 1969 models did not come over. New Zealand Vivas were built at the Trentham plant from late 1967 including a New Zealand-only van version derived from the Viva station wagon. Whereas the Vauxhall Magnum in the UK was a Viva with double headlights and the highest trim level, in New Zealand the name was applied from 1975 to the Viva 1300 and 1800 which had the four-headlight frontal treatment of the British Magnum, but standard Viva interior trim.

The Vauxhall range was pared back to the Chevette and Viva by 1977 as Australian Holdens otherwise became the dominant models.

The Chevette was assembled in New Zealand between 1976 and 1981 and was usually in the top-10 for "most popular new car" throughout its time. All body styles that were available in the UK were sold. The Chevette was not sold in Australia. The Vauxhall 1,256 OHV (from the Viva and Magnum) was the standard engine for all New Zealand Chevette models. A lower trim commercial fleet model called the Chevanne was also offered, based on the Chevette station wagon bodyshell. In 1979 the New Zealand Chevette received Holden-developed "Radial Tuned Suspension" and wider tyres, giving the car superior handling over its rivals. This mechanical update was not fitted to the European models. The Chevette competed with the expanding Japanese small-car market, finally losing out in 1980. The Chevette was the last British-sourced GM product to be assembled in New Zealand, with the last car leaving the line in June 1981. The Australian Holden Gemini TE series replaced the New Zealand Chevette in 1981 and the Vauxhall marque was discontinued in New Zealand thereafter.

The HSV VXR Turbo was a Vauxhall Astra VXR which was imported by Holden Special Vehicles New Zealand in 2008 and again in 2015 (as "Astra VXR.") The Vauxhall models were right-hand-drive versions of the Opel Astra OPC, made in Poland and tuned by Vauxhall in the UK. The only changes made by HSV for both generations was to replace the "Vauxhall" badges with "Holden" badges.

Holden Australia again used the VXR designation for the 2018–2019, sportier V6 ZB Commodore liftback to replace the SS nameplate used on previous higher-performance Commodore models. The liftback was also sold in New Zealand.

In 2017, Holden released a station wagon to complement the Opel-based BK Astra hatchback. It was a badge-engineered Vauxhall Astra sportwagon built and sold in the United Kingdom and was sold in Australia and New Zealand as the Astra Sportwagon.

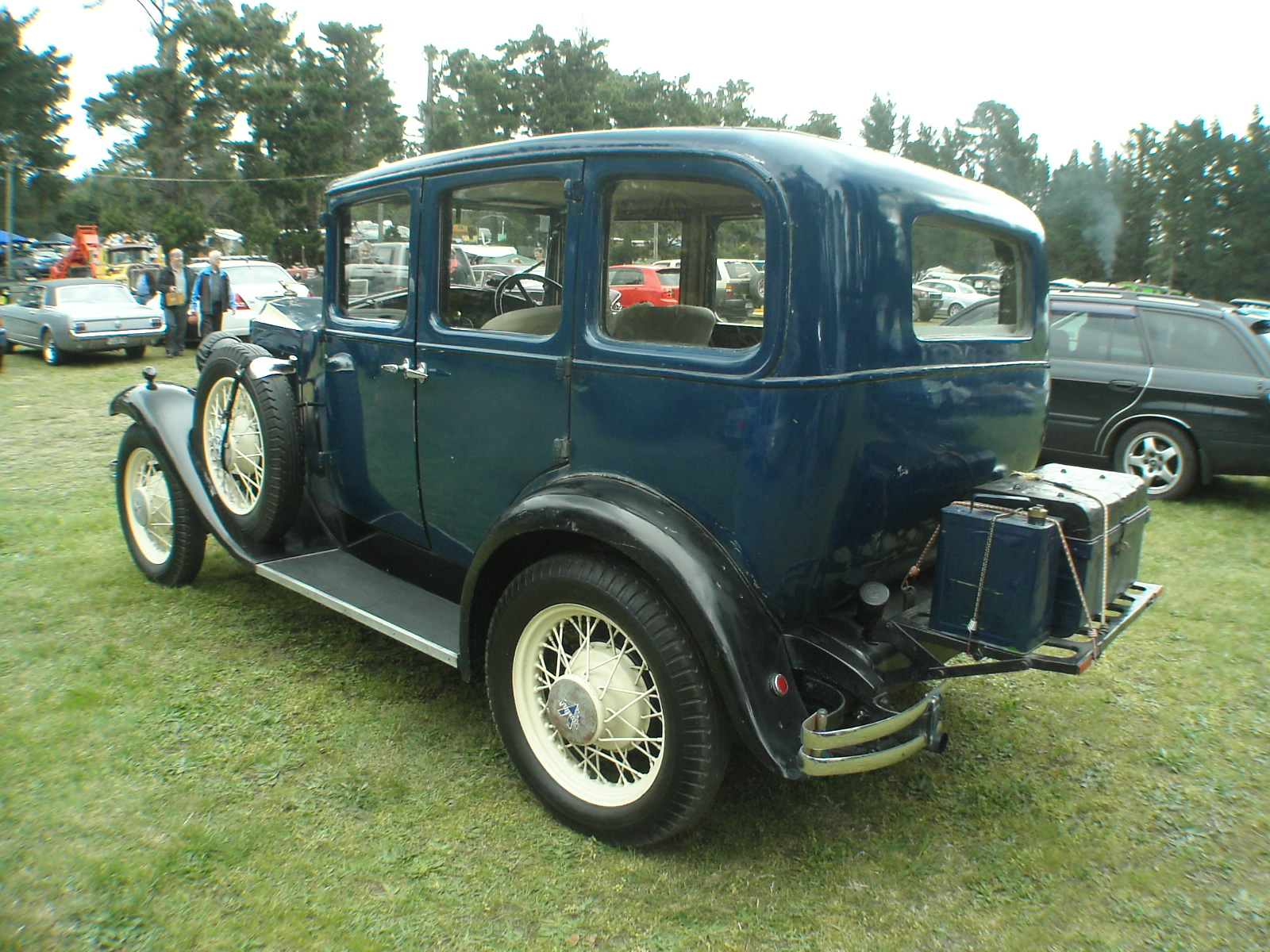
1931 Vauxhall Cadet. 1931 was the first year of Vauxhall assembly in New Zealand

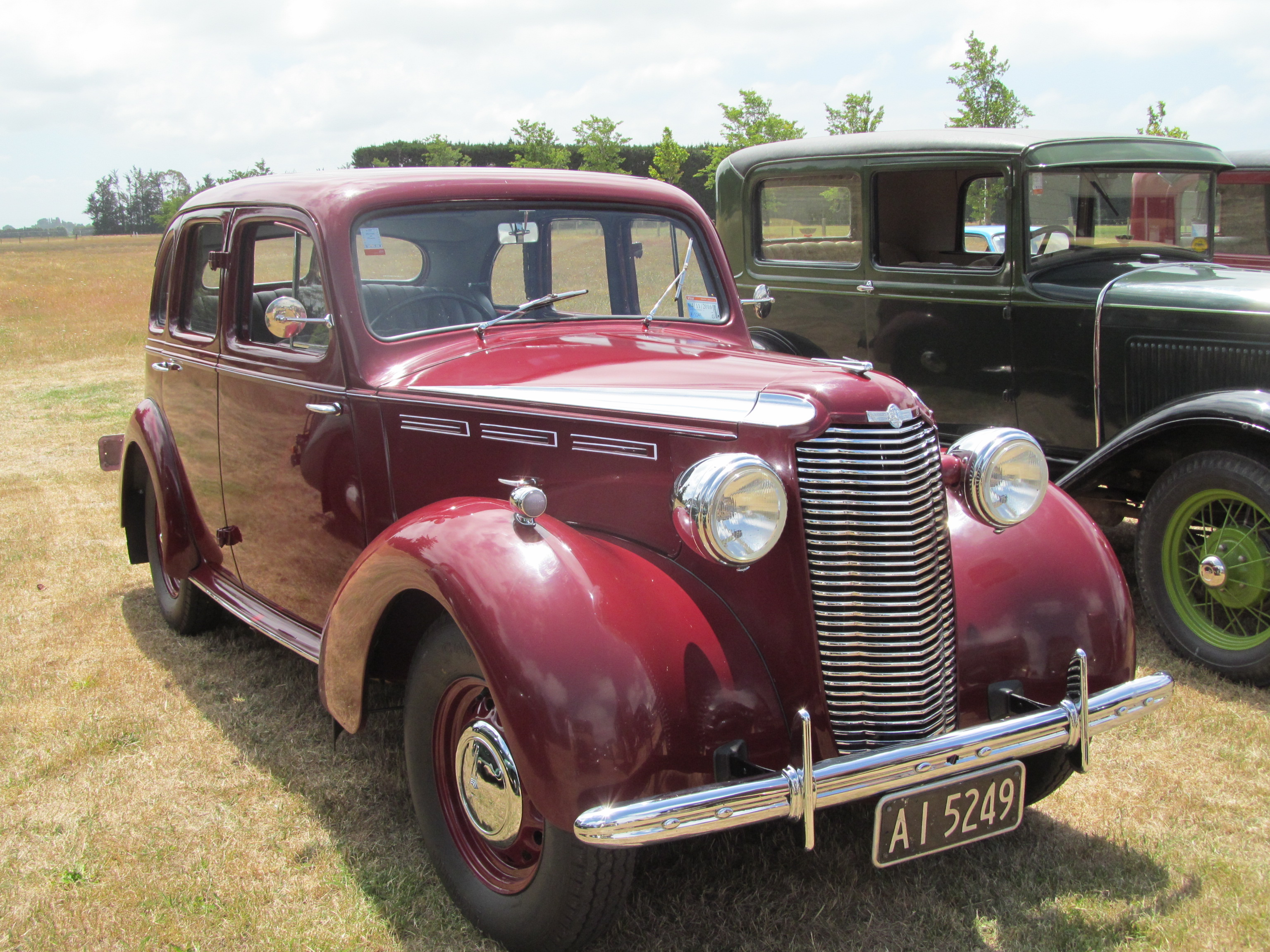
1948 Vauxhall 14 Model J (New Zealand)

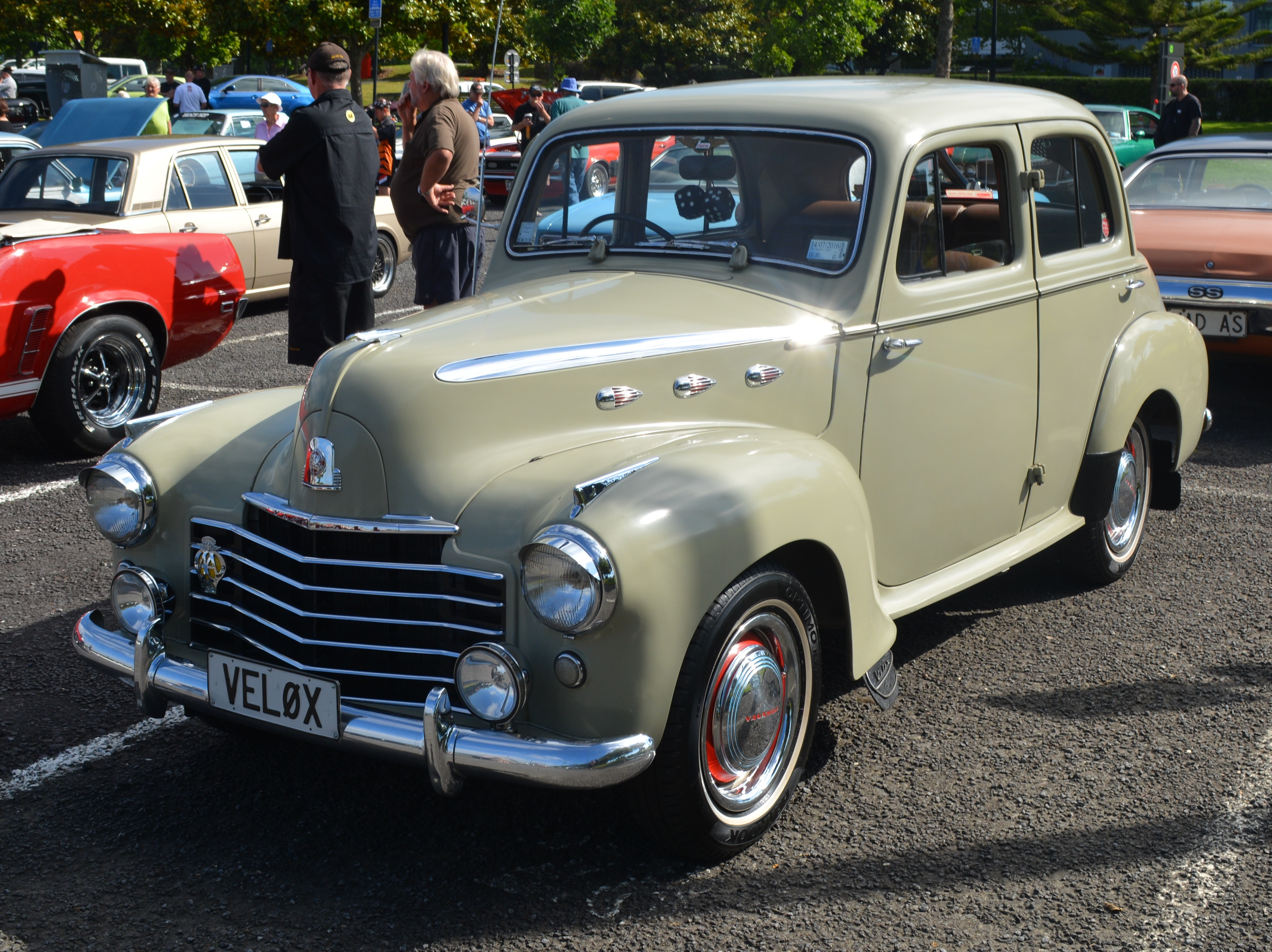
1951 Vauxhall Velox (New Zealand)

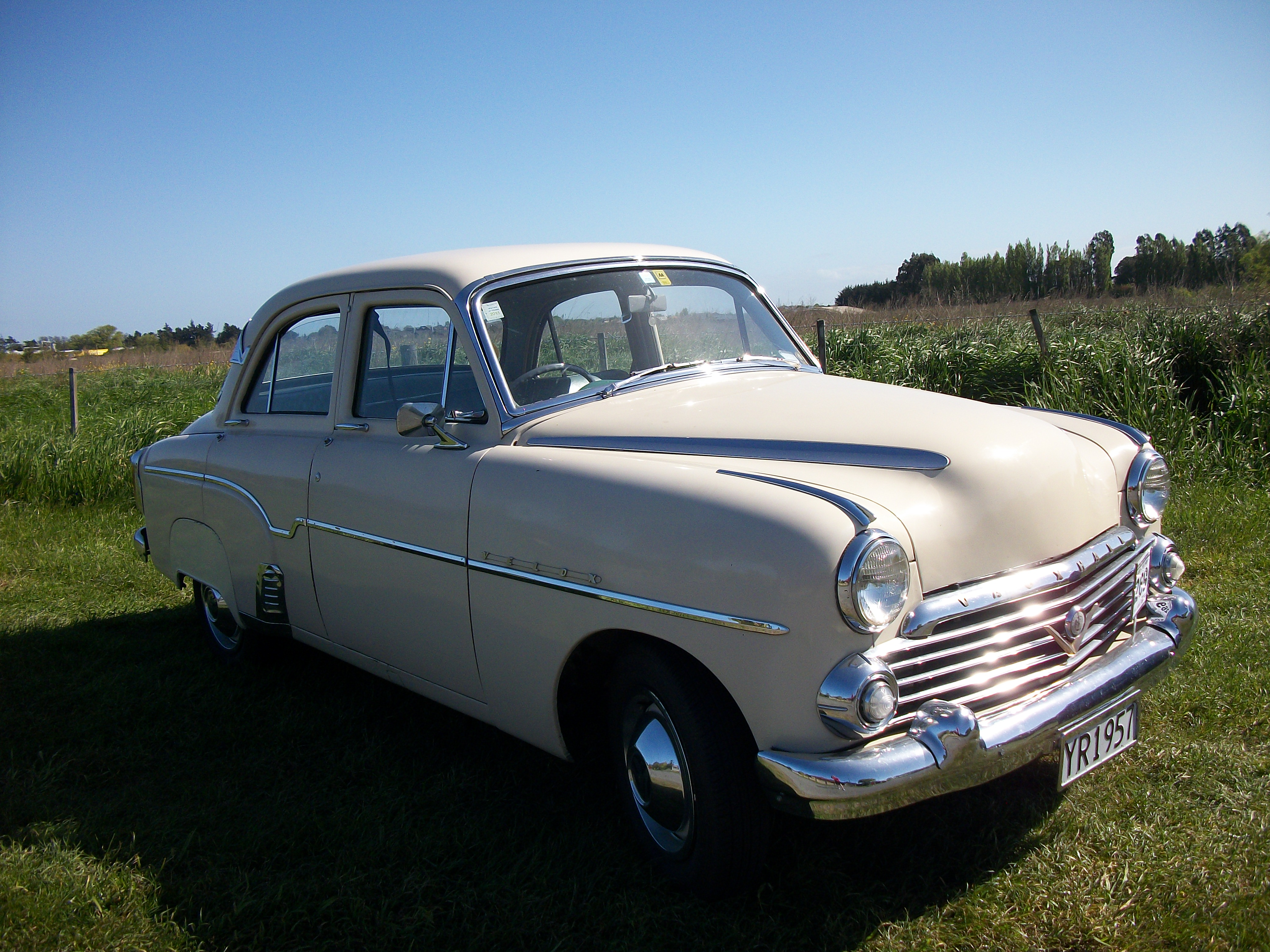
1957 Vauxhall Velox (New Zealand)

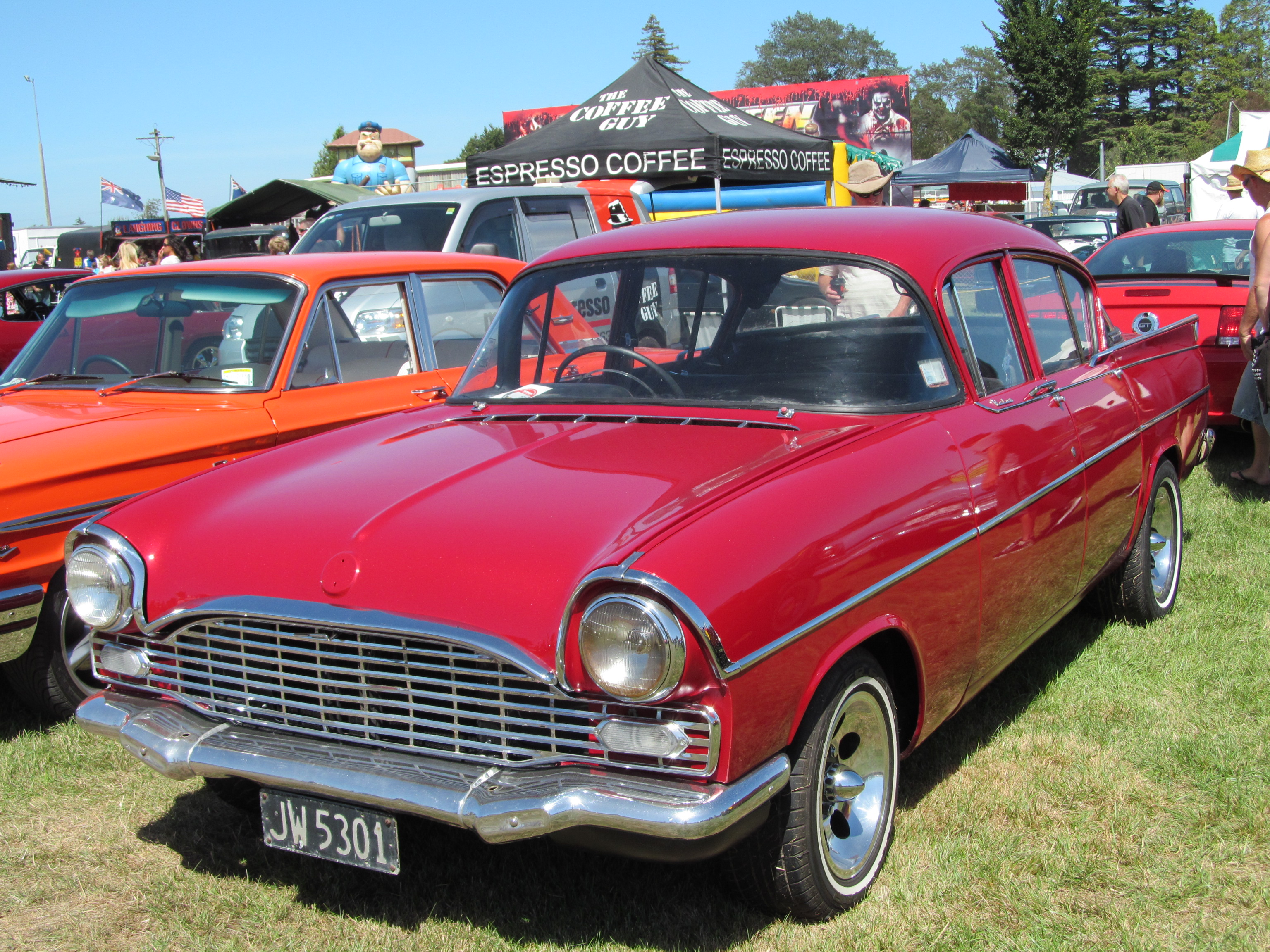
1961 Vauxhall Velox PA (New Zealand)

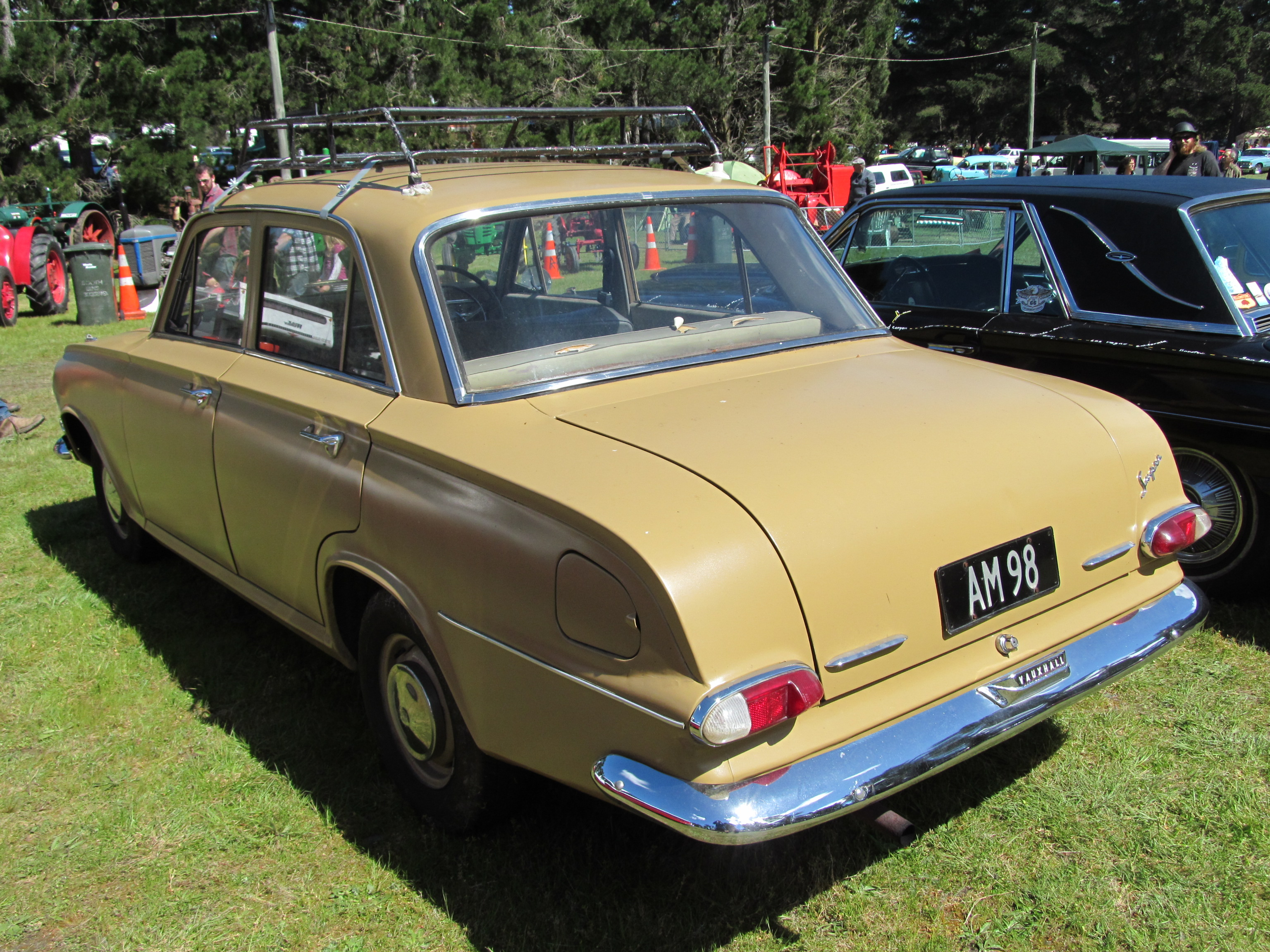
1963 Vauxhall Victor (New Zealand)

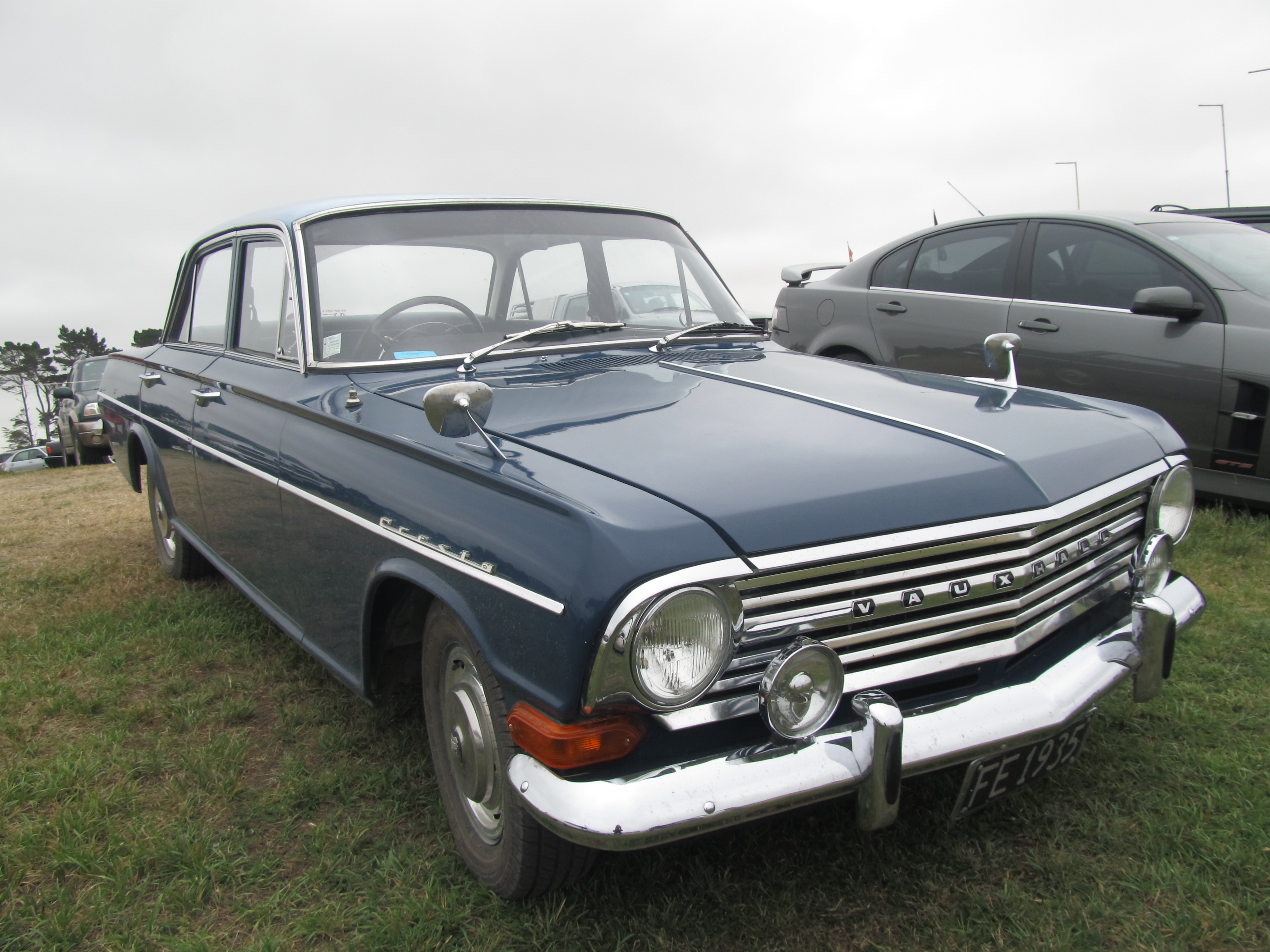
1965 Vauxhall Cresta (New Zealand)

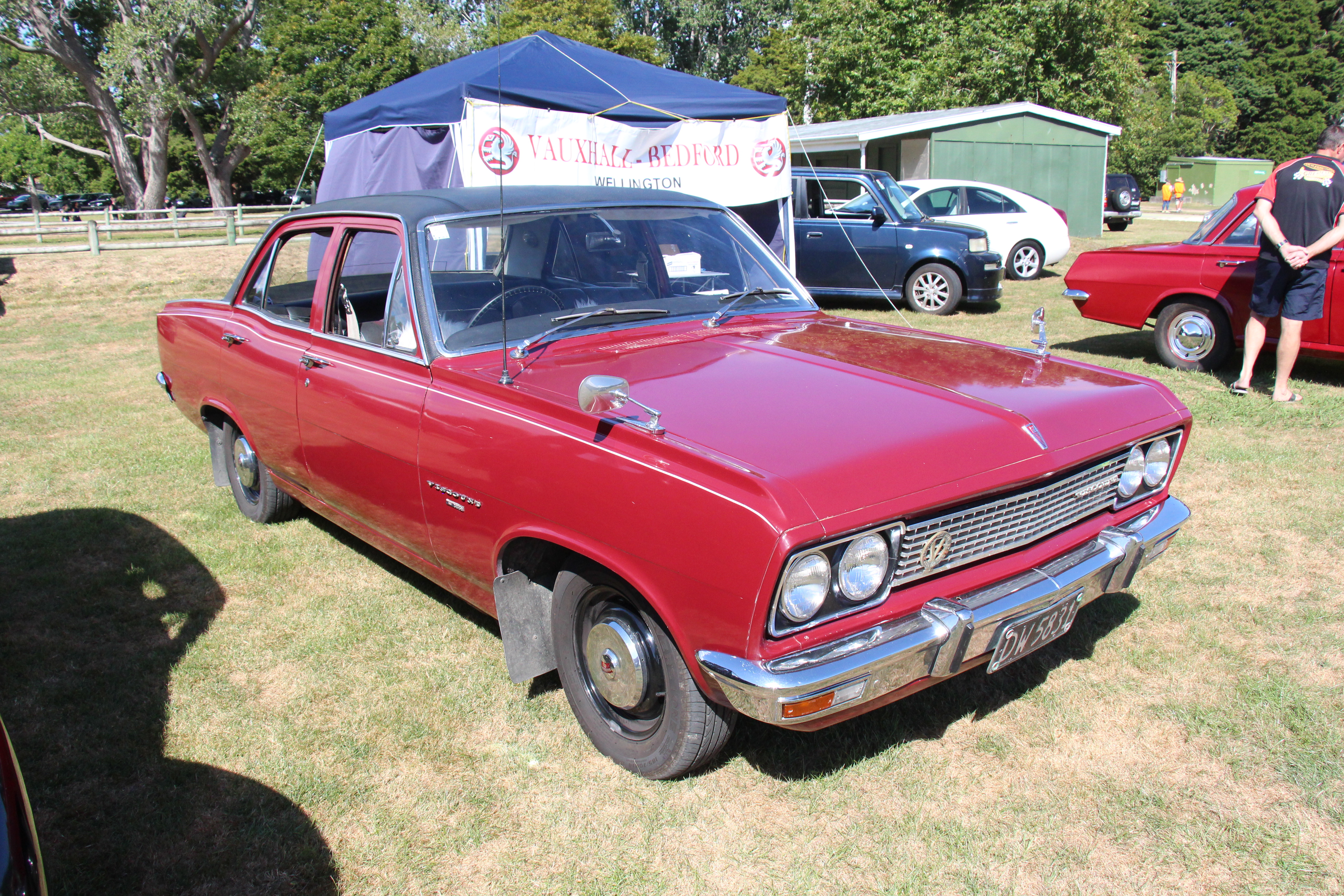
1966 Vauxhall "Viscount", the top of the line Cresta model, introduced in 1966 (New Zealand)

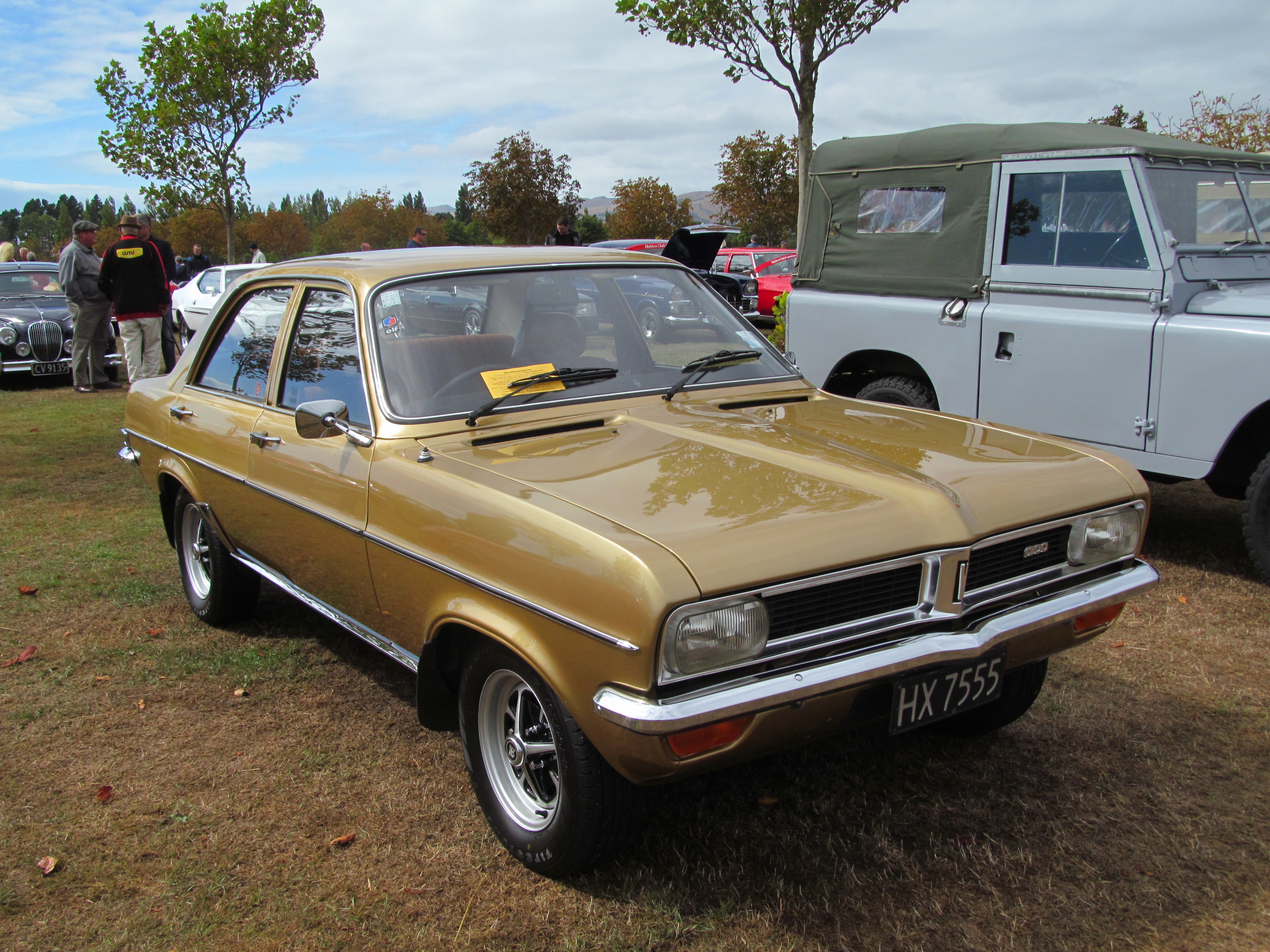
1976 Vauxhall Viva 1300 (New Zealand)

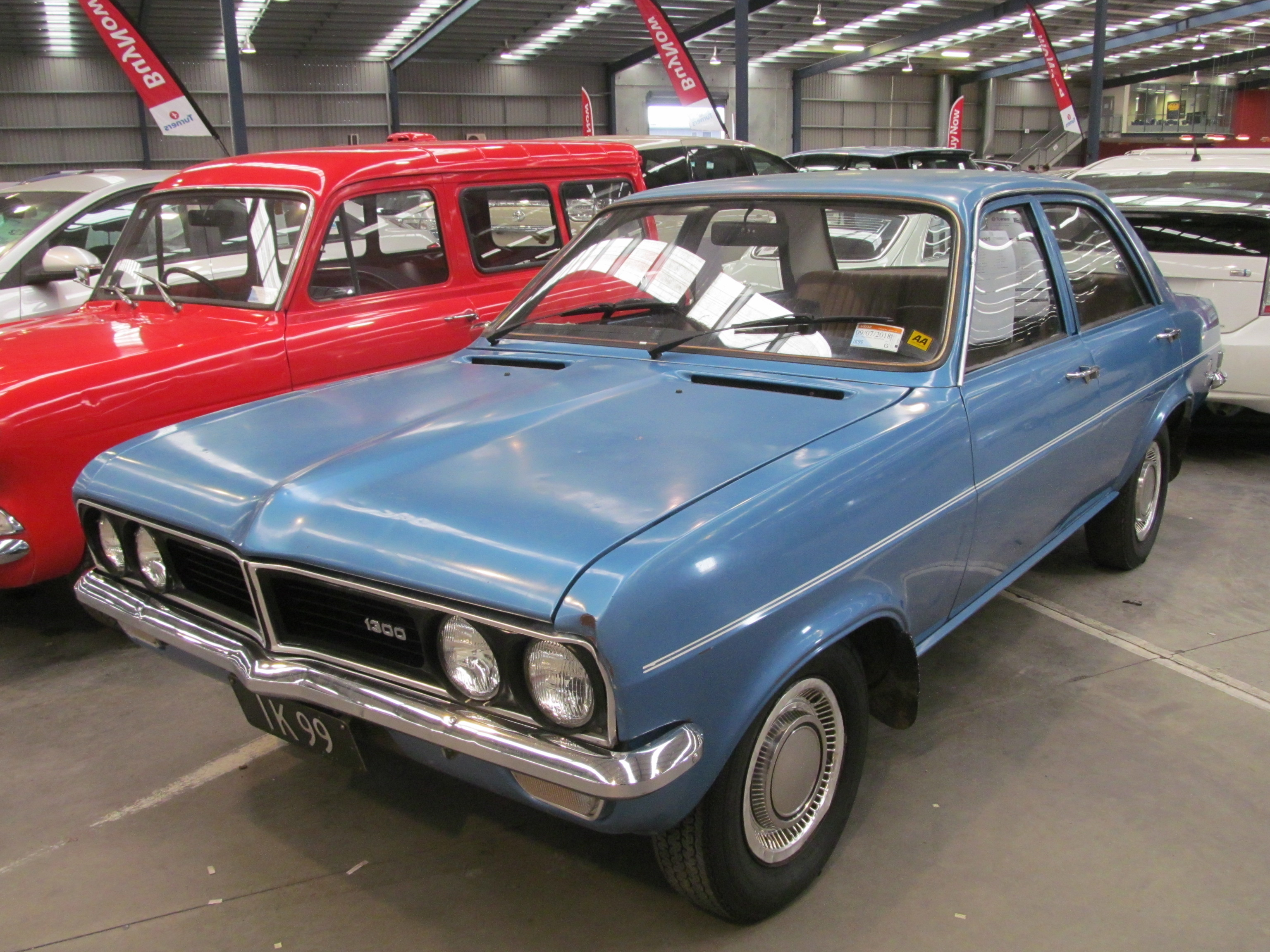
1977 Vauxhall Magnum 1300. Unlike the upmarket UK model, the New Zealand Magnum was just a plain Viva with double headlights

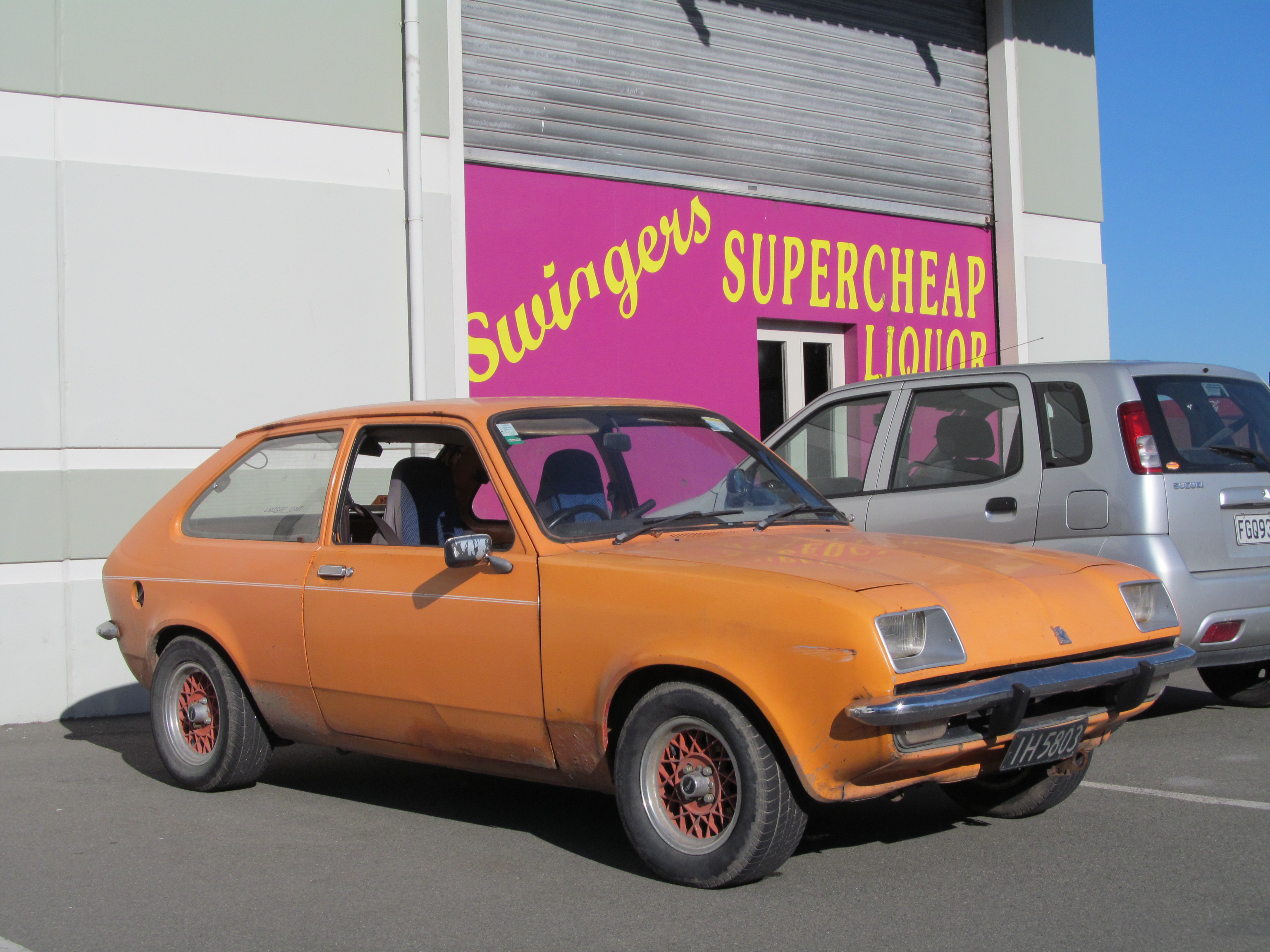
1977 Vauxhall Chevette hatchback (New Zealand)

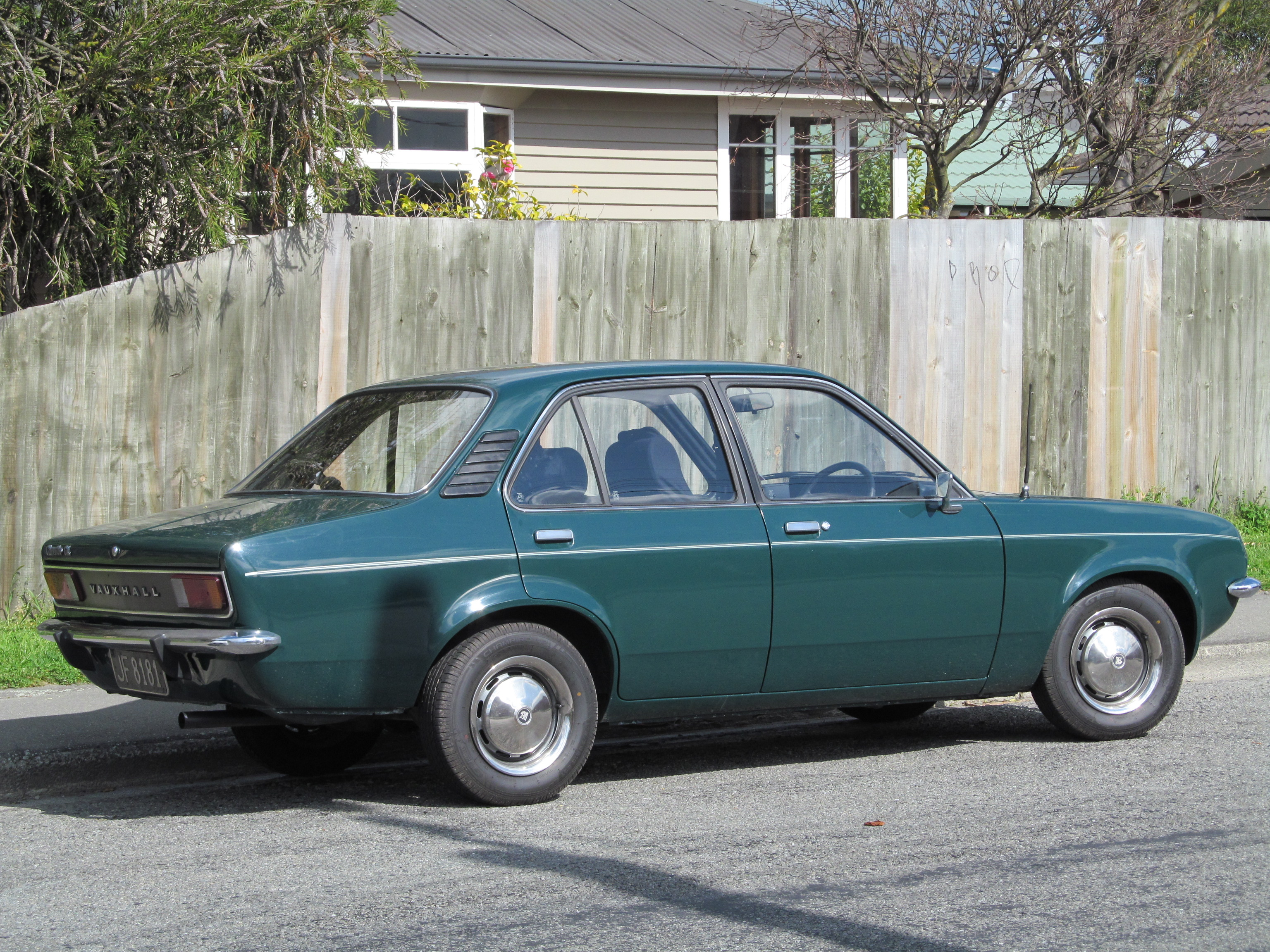
Last of the Vauxhalls in New Zealand. 1980 Vauxhall Chevette "saloon" (sedan)

=== Bedford ===
Bedfords were assembled in New Zealand from 1931, at the same time as the Vauxhalls were introduced. During the 1940s General Motors New Zealand built what would become the standard bus for the New Zealand Railways Road Services, using the Bedford truck chassis with bodies built by New Zealand Motor Bodies. When the Bedford SB was released in Britain in 1950, NZRRS continued to use the SB with the coach bodies built by NZMB right up until 1980. NZRRS had the largest fleet of SB buses in the world with 1,280 SB buses built between 1954 and 1981.

After World War II, Bedford trucks became very popular in New Zealand and were used as trucks, tow trucks, buses, fire engines, and ambulances during the 1950s, 1960s, and 1970s. The Bedford TK was assembled at Petone throughout the 1960s and into the 1970s. Over 500,000 of the TK were produced. It was succeeded by the Bedford TM series, followed by a "Bedford-by-Isuzu" model assembled from knock-down kits from Japan. These Bedford badged Isuzu trucks were marketed in an attempt to boost sales of Isuzu trucks by associating the brand with the trusted Bedford marque.

Bedford vans were assembled in New Zealand throughout the 1960s and 1970s with the last CF series assembled in 1984 upon the closure of the Petone assembly plant. Its original four-cylinder 1.8L engine was eventually replaced in New Zealand and Australia with Holden's 202 cubic-inch straight-six in the 1980s.

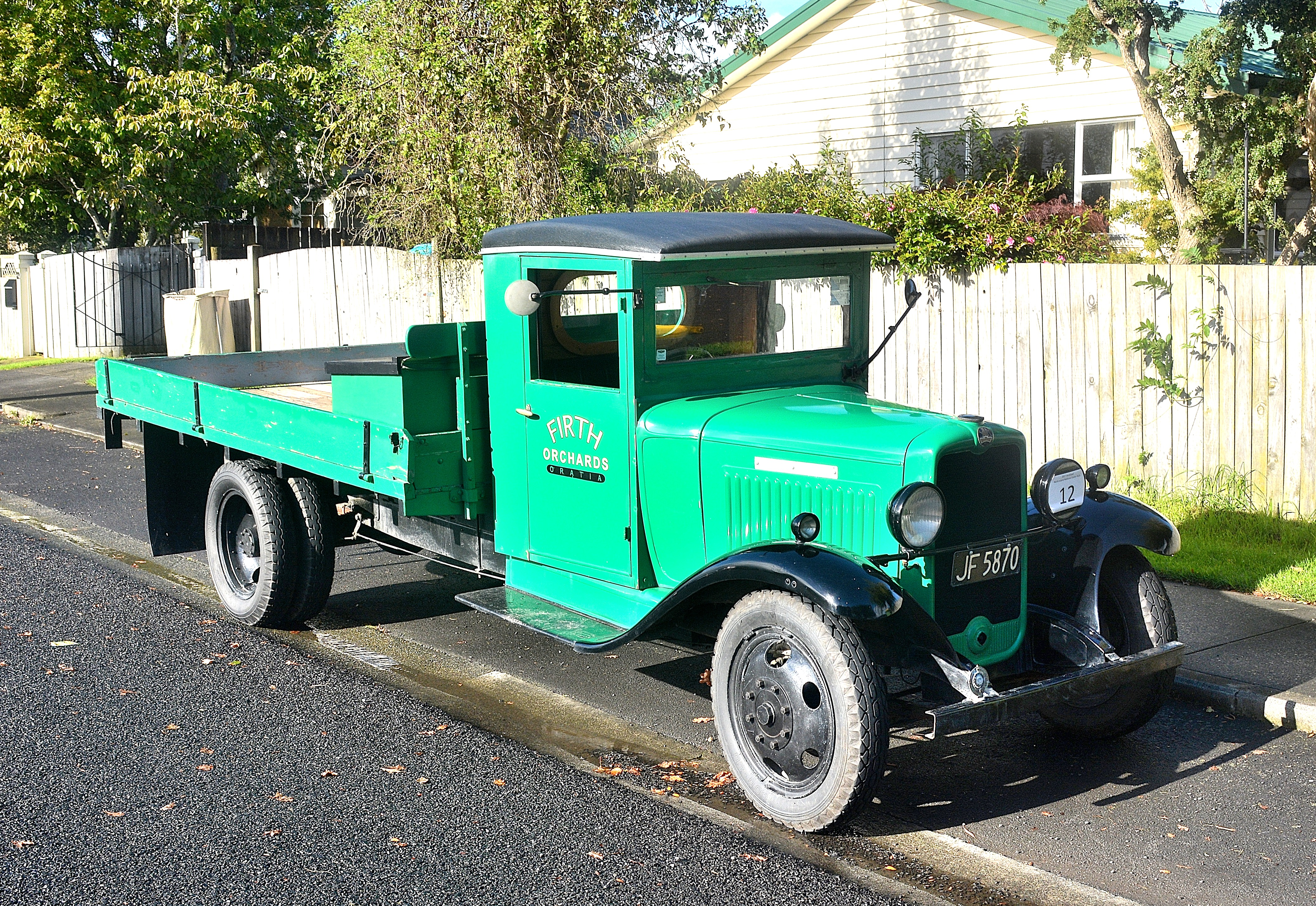
1931 Bedford WLG truck. The first Bedford model to be assembled in New Zealand

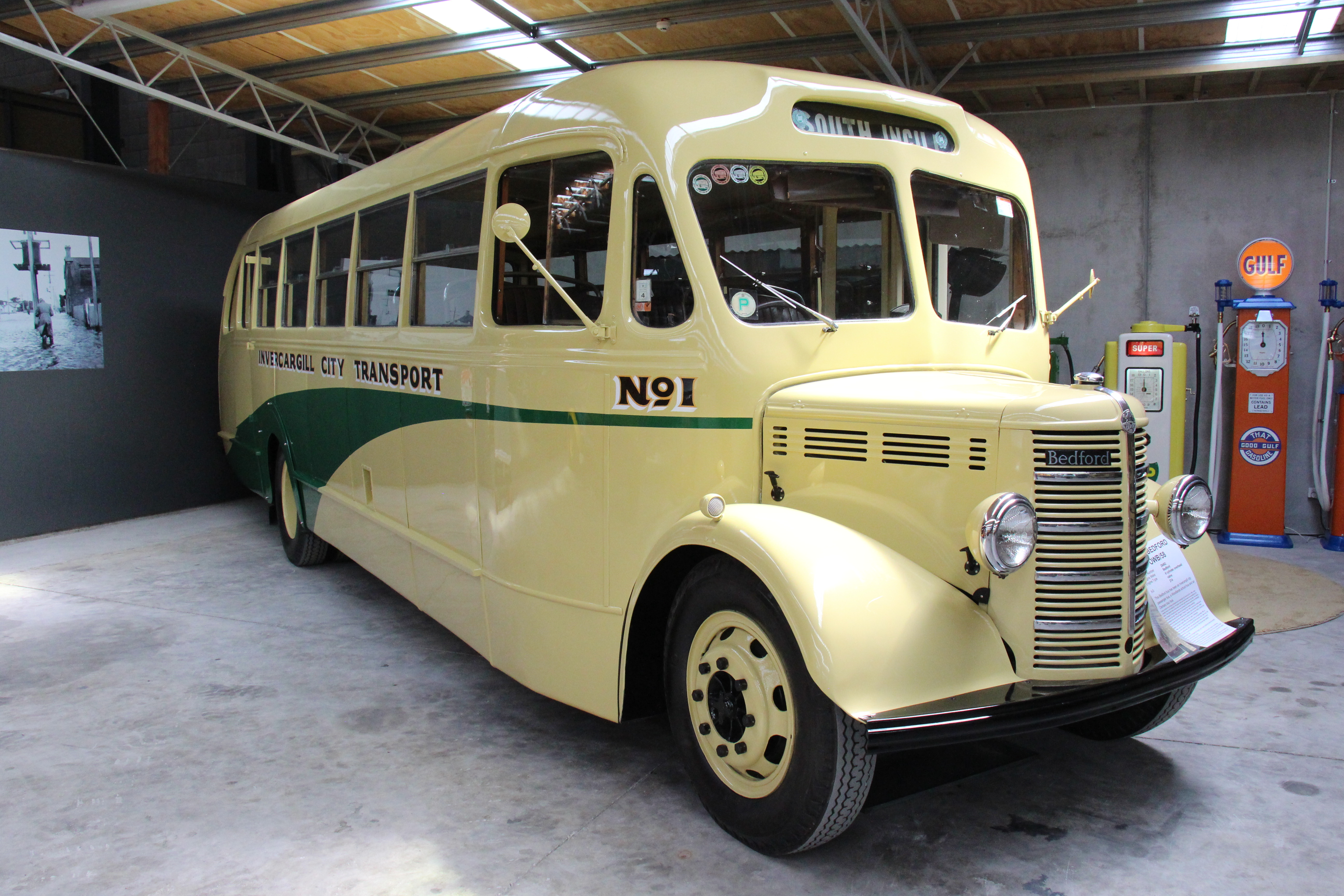
1946 Bedford bus. "Invercargill City Transport" (New Zealand)

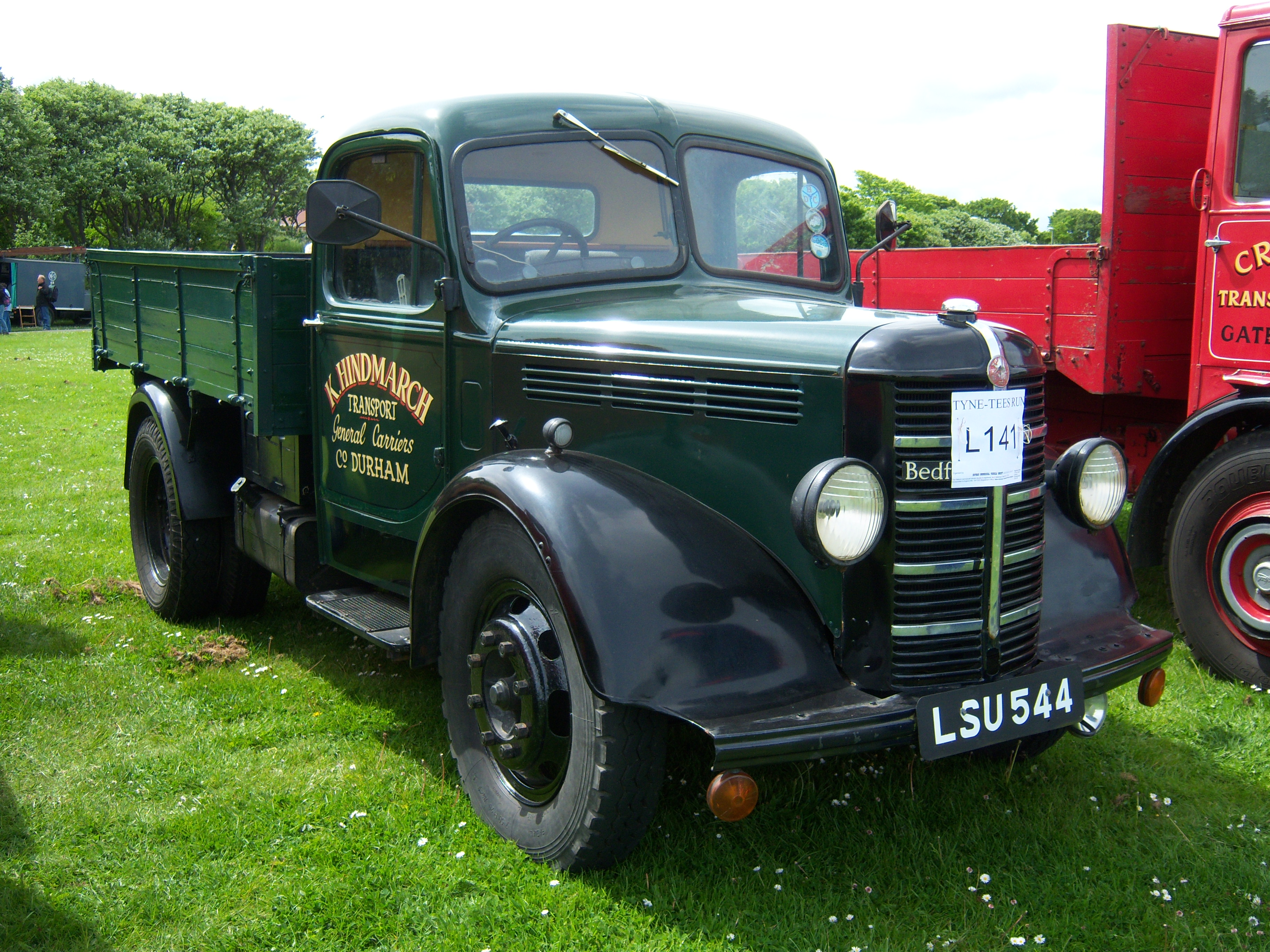
1948 Bedford MSD truck with drop-sides (New Zealand)

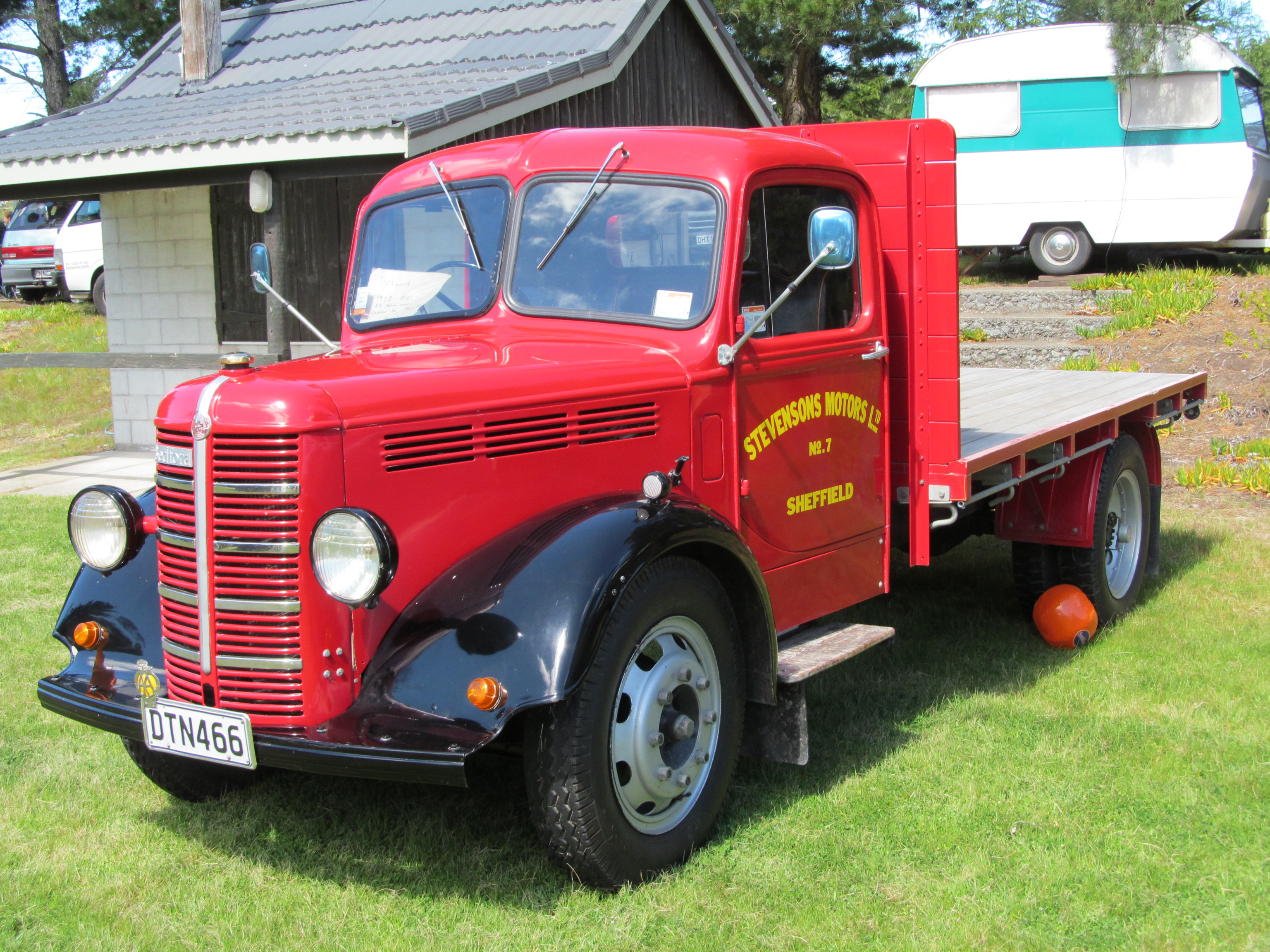
1952 Bedford MLC truck (New Zealand)

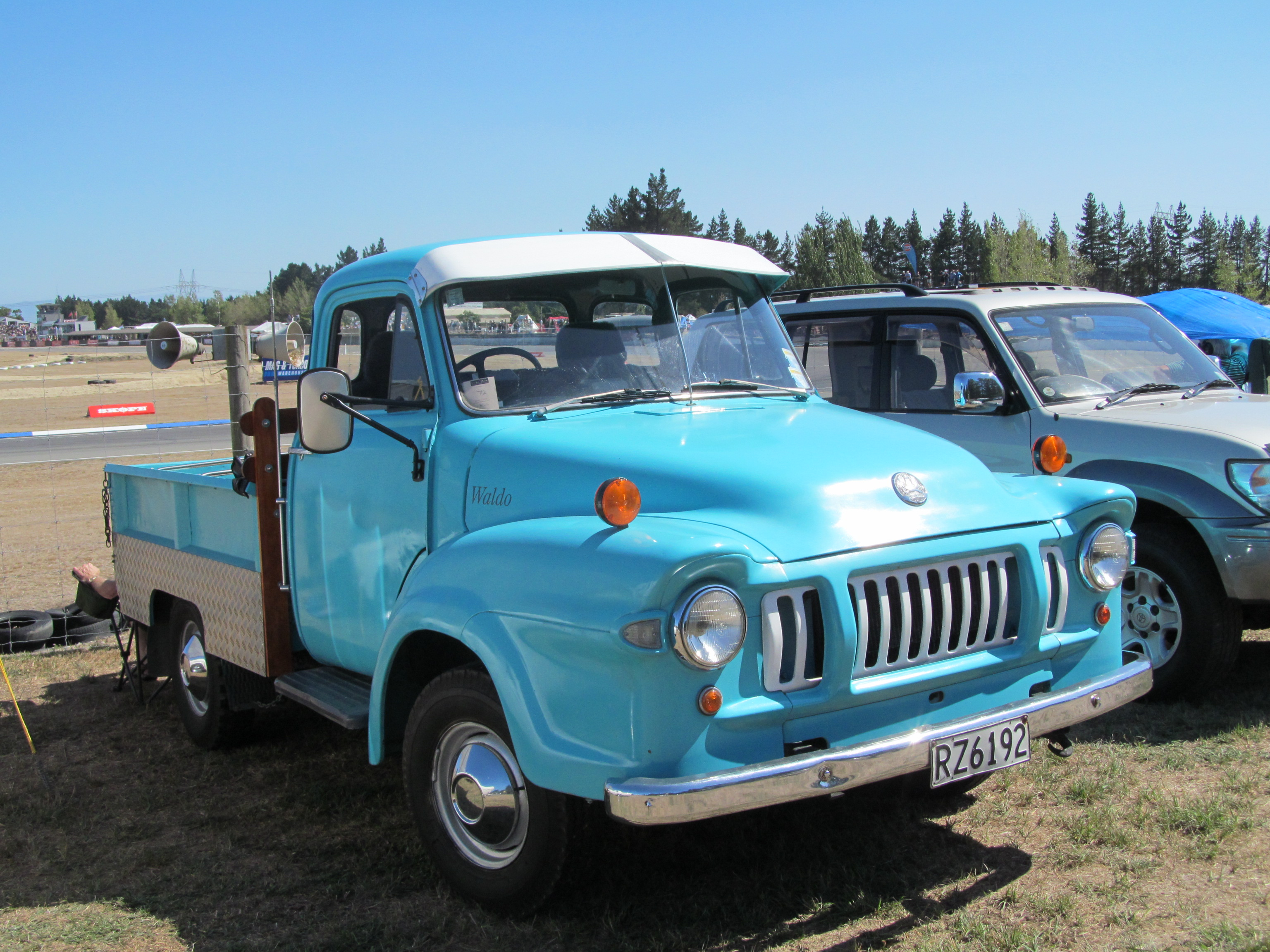
1965 Bedford J6 pickup truck (New Zealand)

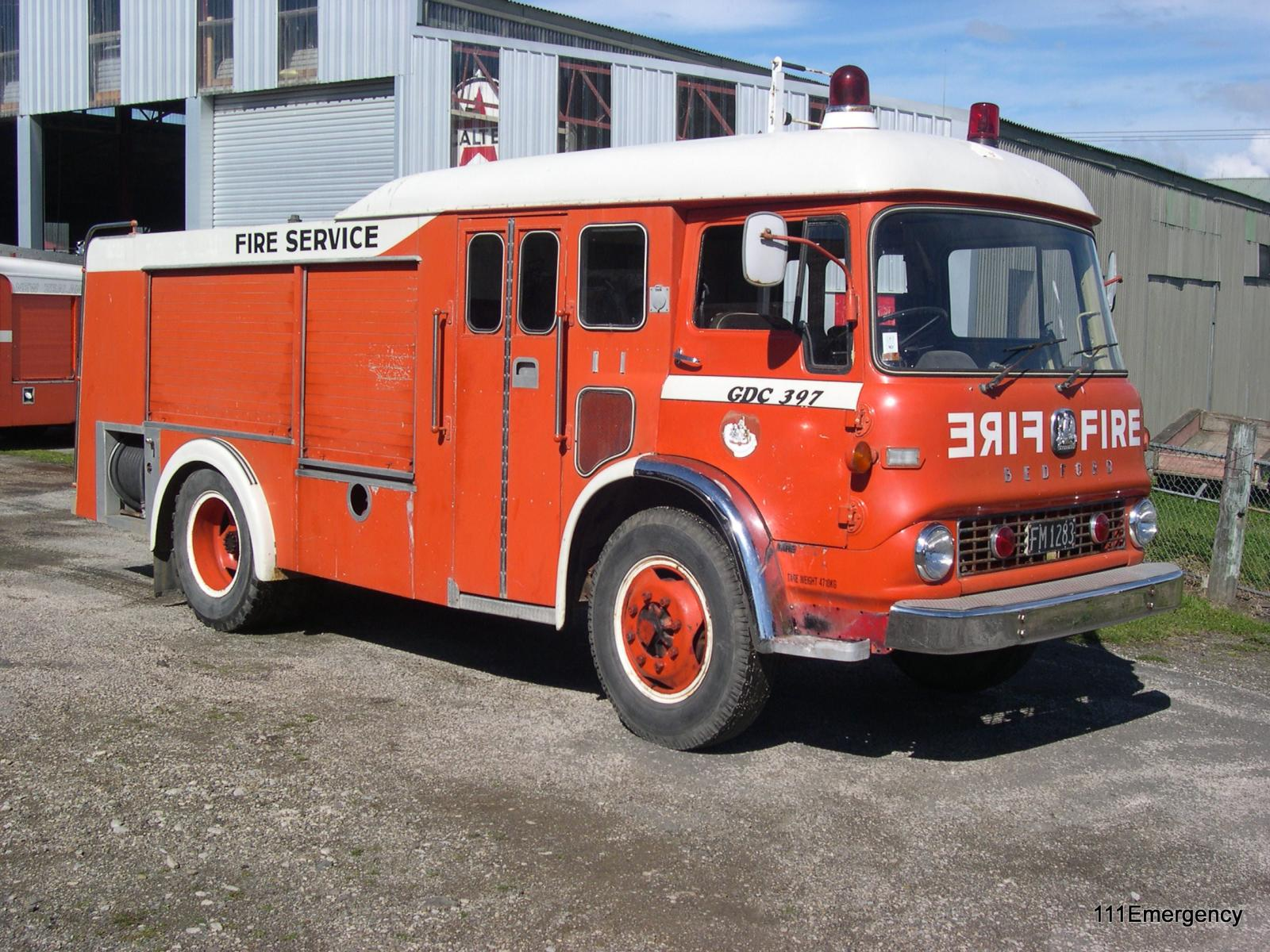
Bedford fire truck at East Coast Museum of Transport, Gisborne (New Zealand)

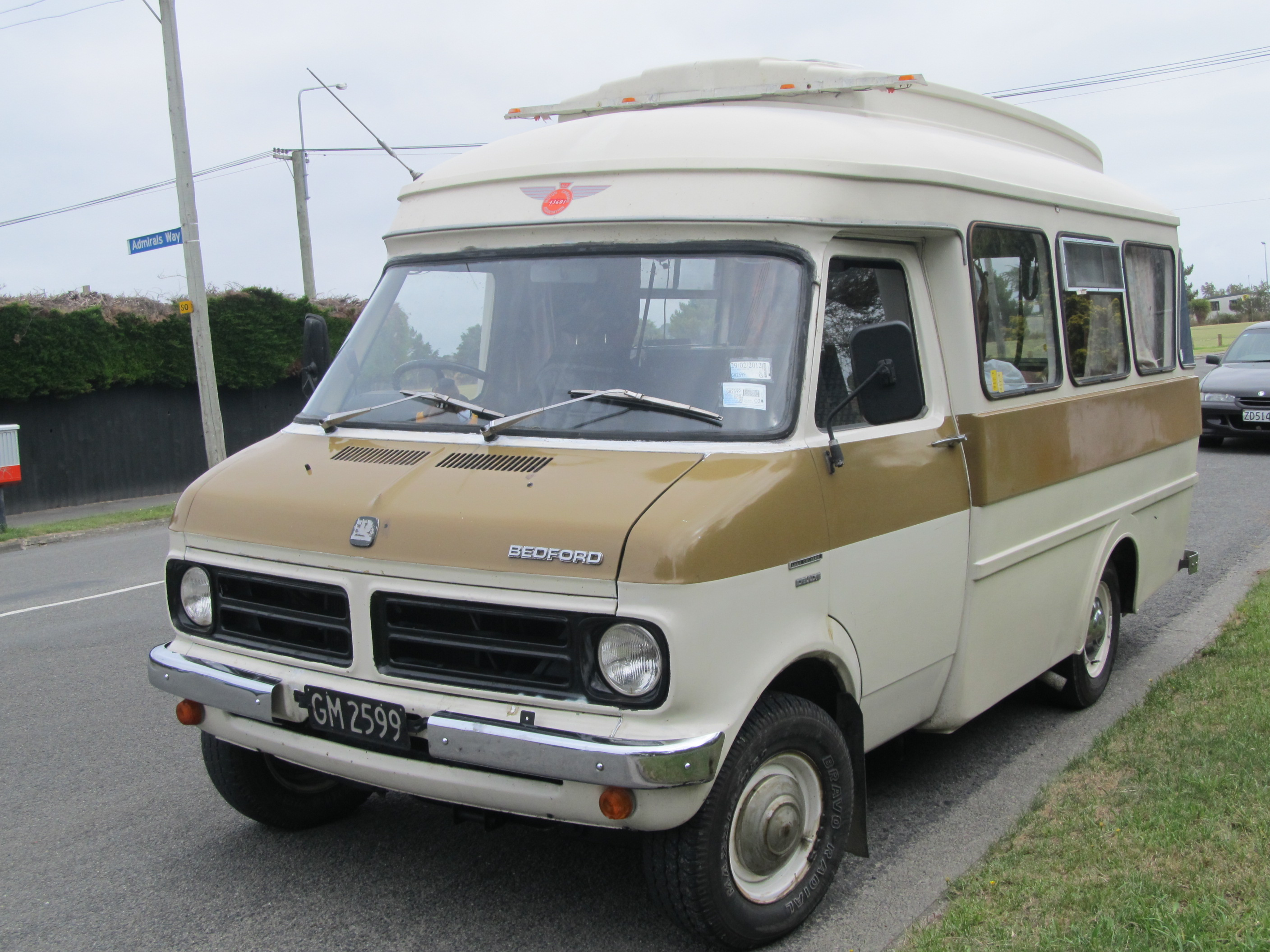
1972 Bedford CF campervan (New Zealand)

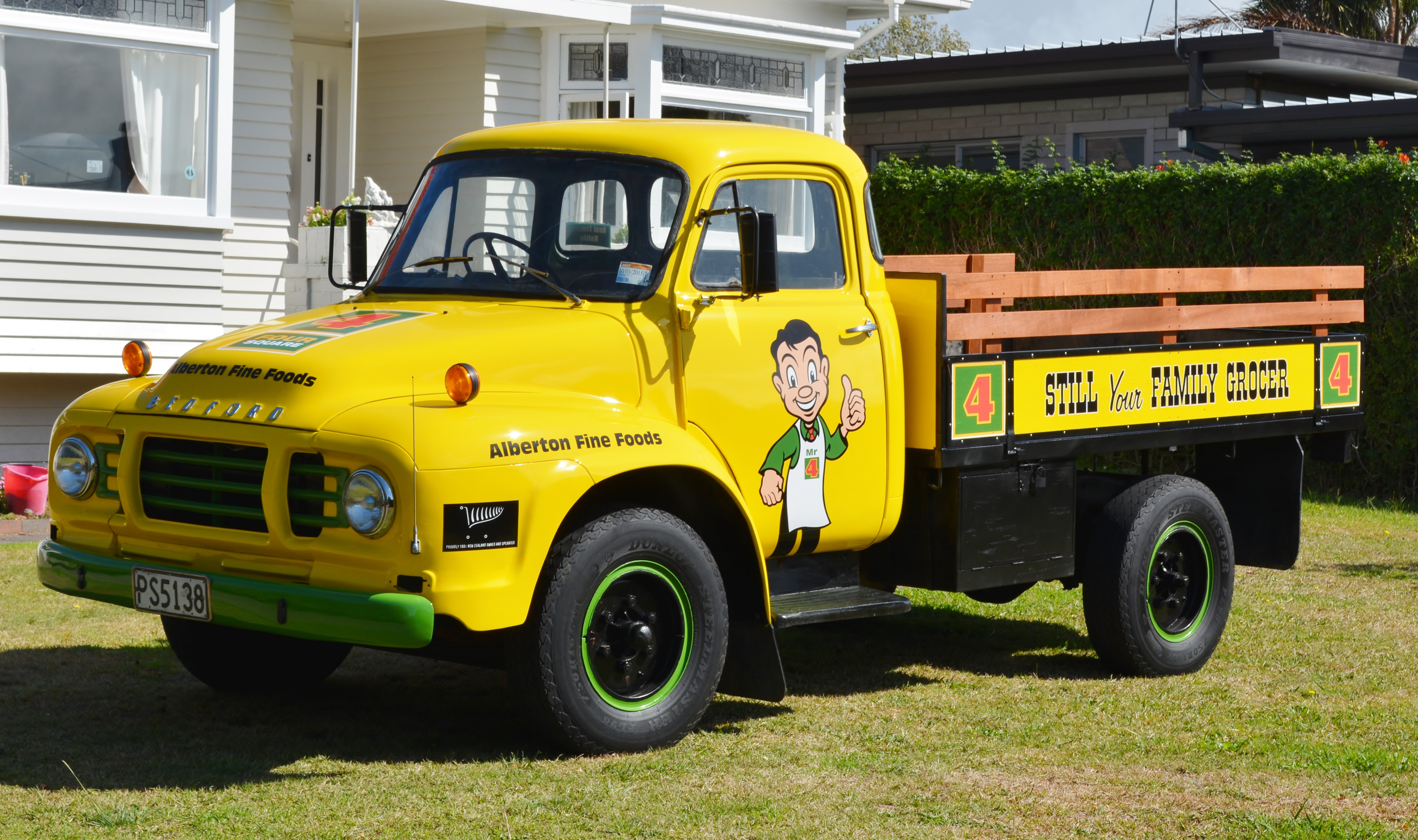
1976 Bedord J1 truck. Over 500,000 Bedford trucks were built on the TK platform in New Zealand

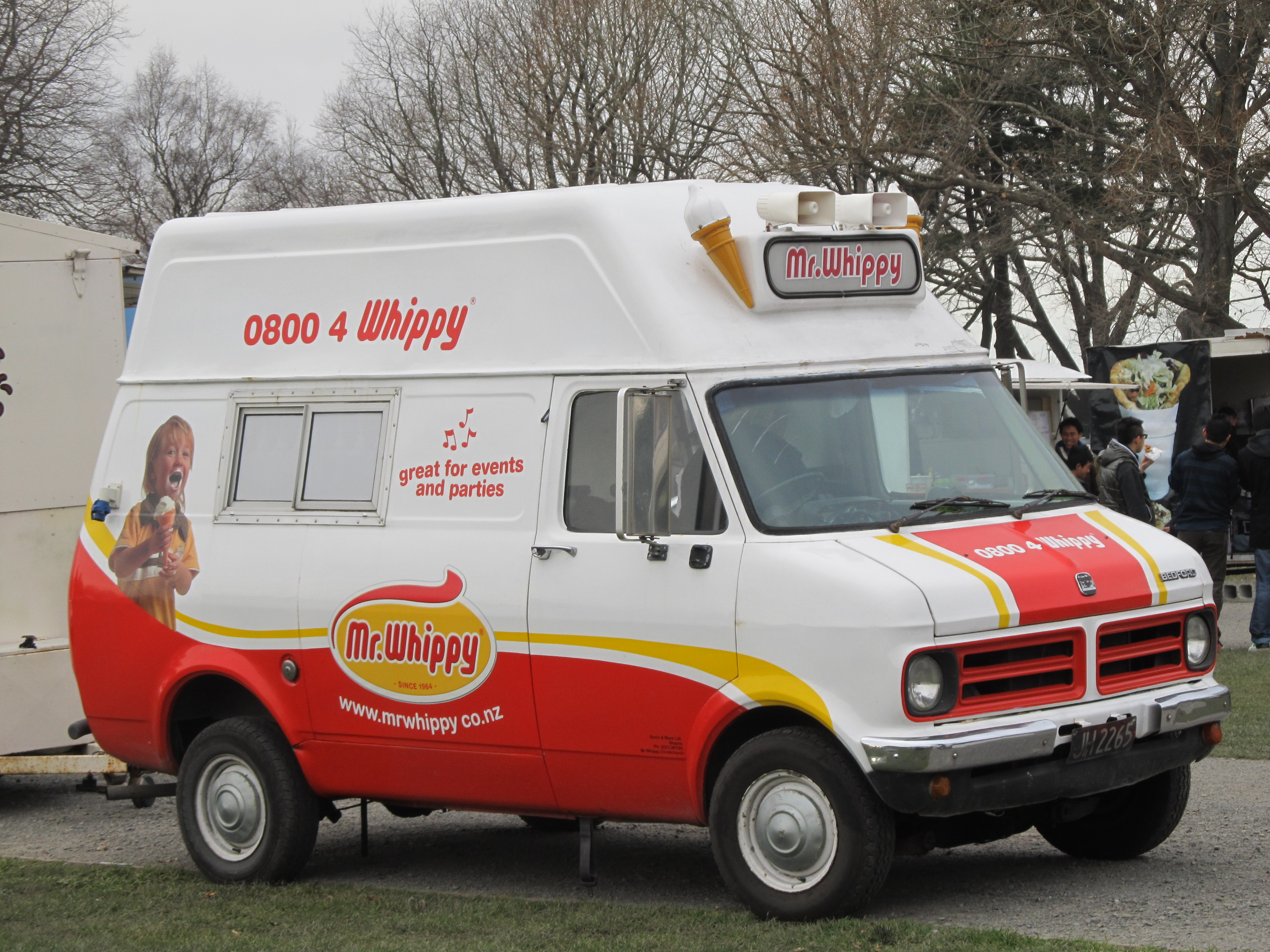
1979 Bedford CF ice-cream truck (New Zealand)

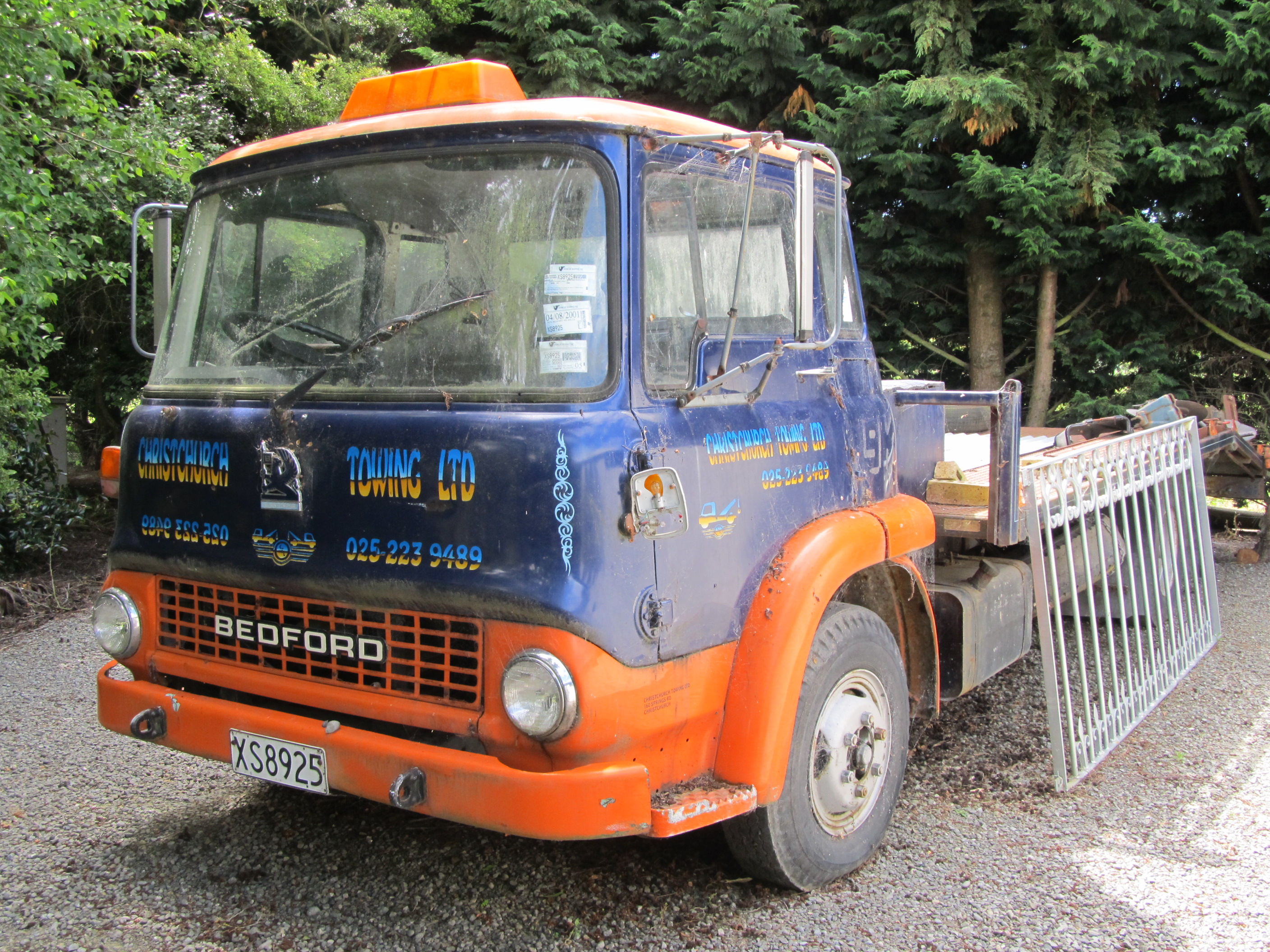
Bedford TK tow truck (New Zealand)

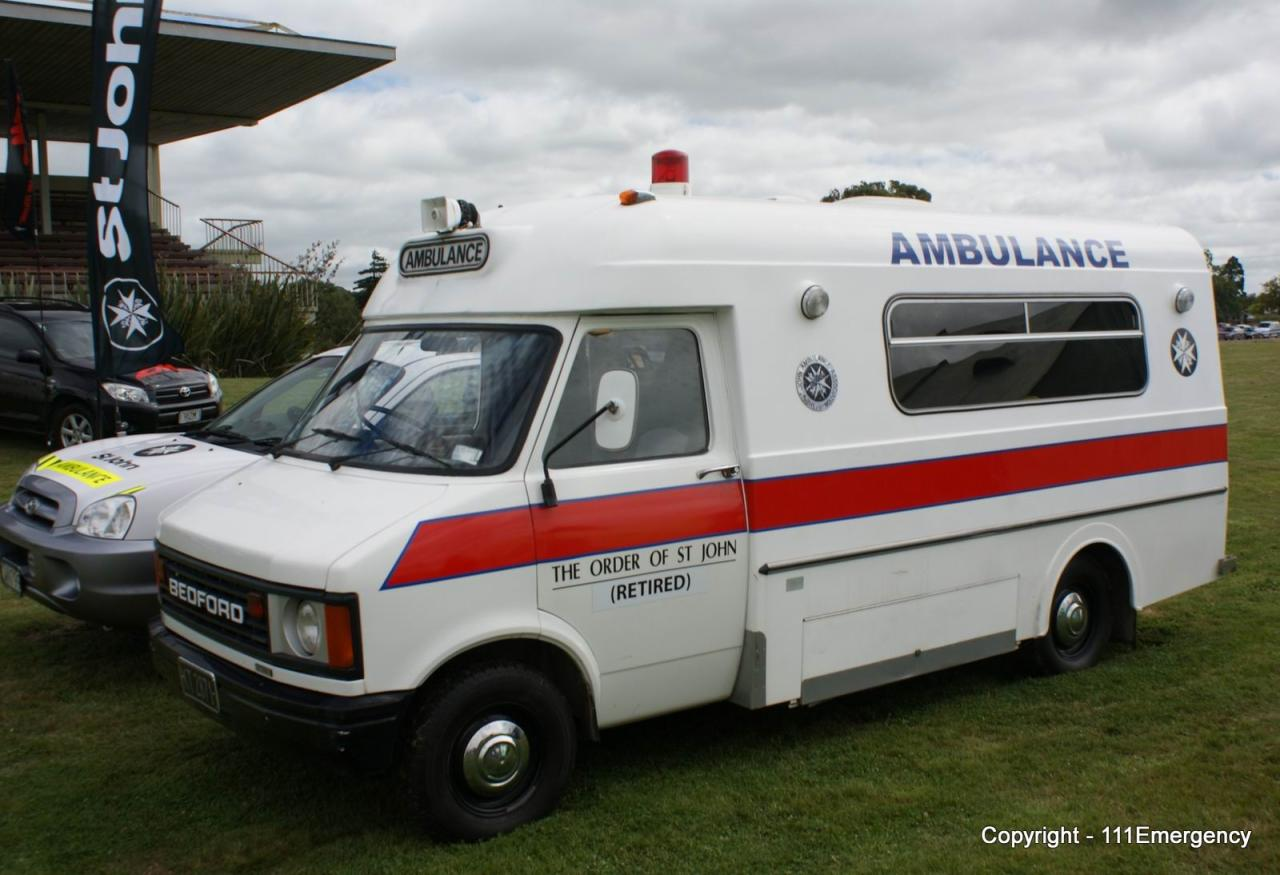
Bedford ambulance, built on the CF platform

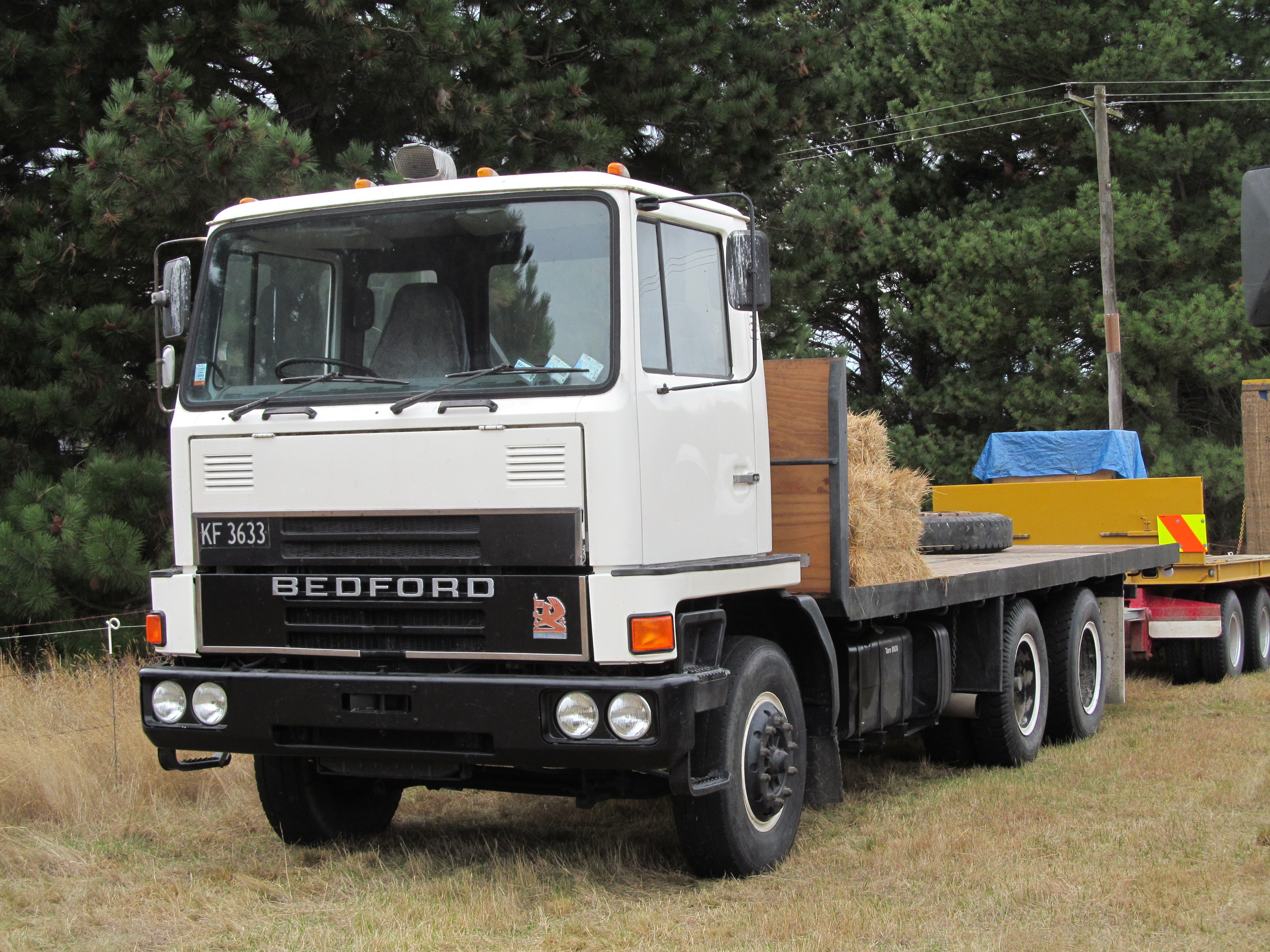
1981 Bedford TM truck (New Zealand)

=== Holden ===
Holdens were fully imported from Australia until 1957. The first Holden assembled in New Zealand was an FE sedan which came off the line on 31 January 1957. During the 1960s the Holden range expanded to include the Holden Special, Belmont, Kingswood, and Premier followed by Holden's mid-sized cars: the Vauxhall Viva-derived Torana and Sunbird, into the 1970s. The Holden Monaro was always fully imported.

Holden Australia's new Holden HQ series was released in 1971 and all models were assembled in New Zealand from knock-down kits at GMNZ's Trentham plant using some local content. Subsequent HJ, HX, HZ, and WB models continued to be assembled locally with the exception of the Monaro which was imported, as with previous models. During the 1970s Belmonts and Kingswoods became the main Police cars for both the New Zealand Ministry of Transport and New Zealand Police.

GMNZ assembled the long-wheelbase, Statesman HJ, HX, HZ, and WB models until 1984. A variant of the HQ, built in Australia, was marketed in New Zealand as the "Chevrolet 350" from 1971 to 1974. This was in reality an Australian Statesman with the bigger American Chevrolet 350-cubic-inch V8 and badged as a "Chevrolet." While Statesman was its own marque in Australia, in New Zealand it was the model name, marketed as "Holden Statesman."

1979 saw the Opel Rekord-derived Holden Commodore arrive in New Zealand.

As 1983 began, GM New Zealand began fielding something close to a full range: the Isuzu-based Holden Gemini as the entry-level car, the Australian-built Holden Camira as the mid-sized one, and the New Zealand-built, Australian Commodore in the large sector. All ranges had sedan and wagon variants (the Gemini also had a van version), and each lineup included sporting and luxury versions. However, the Australian GM J Car-based JB Camira fared so badly in New Zealand due to quality problems that local GM bosses decided to replace it with the GM J car-based Isuzu Aska (or "JJ") from Japan instead of the facelifted and upgraded Australian-built JD Camira. Still badged as a "Holden", this was known as the JJ Camira, and proved to be much better than its Australian predecessor. The Isuzu-based model survived until the Australian-built JE Camira was released in 1987. A far better car than its predecessors, the JE Camira arrived in New Zealand in 1987.

Australian Commodore models were also locally built (and later imported) with New Zealand-only engine and transmission variants and trim levels, marketed in New Zealand as the Holden Commodore Royale:

- The New Zealand-built Holden Commodore (VH) Royale (1981–1984) was built with the Holden straight-six 1.9-litre Starfire inline-four engine with either a five-speed manual transmission or three-speed automatic transmission.
- The New Zealand-built Holden Commodore (VK) Royale (1984–1987) was based on the Australian VK Calais and featured the Holden 1.9-litre engine as fitted to the previous VH Royale, or the optional 3.3-litre Black straight-six. Unique alloy wheels were also fitted along with several other minor detail changes.
- The New Zealand-built Holden Commodore (VL) Royale (1987–1989) sold alongside the more upmarket VL Calais, but did not share its unique semi-concealed headlamps and rear disc brakes. Engine-wise, the 2.0-litre Nissan RB20 straight-six engine was fitted, with the 3.0-litre Nissan RB30E six-cylinder made optional. Both engines were coupled with a four-speed automatic.
- The Holden Commodore (VN) Royale (1992) was built in Australia exclusively for the New Zealand market. Like the VL, the VN Royale sold alongside the more upmarket VN Calais, but was fitted with the 2.0-litre Opel C20NE four-cylinder engine with a four-speed automatic transmission.
- The Holden Commodore (VS II) Royale (1998) was built in Australia and sold exclusively in New Zealand. While in similar specification to the VS Calais also sold in New Zealand, this model featured the front-end of the Holden Caprice (VS), the alloy wheels from the Holden Berlina (VS) and Opel X25XE 2.5-litre V6 engine.
- The Holden Commodore (VT) Royale (1998–2000) was the New Zealand version of the Holden Berlina (VT) sedan, built in Australia and sold exclusively in New Zealand.
- The Holden Commodore (VX) Royale (2000–2002) was the New Zealand version of the Holden Berlina (VX) sedan, built in Australia and sold exclusively in New Zealand.

On 21 November 1990, a 3.8-litre Commodore V6 was the last vehicle to be assembled by GM in New Zealand, before the plant was closed in June 1991. After local assembly ended, all subsequent models of the Holden Commodore sedan, wagon, and ute continued to be imported from Australia until production end in 2017. During this time New Zealand also received the Caprice and Statesman models which were reintroduced by Holden Australia in 1990 under the Holden marque. Production of the Statesman ended in 2010, however, the Caprice remained until production end in 2017.

After importing the Korean-built Chevrolet Cruze until 2009, Holden in Australia announced a locally produced version of the model which would be made in Australia. Marketed as the "Series II" Holden Cruze, or "JH" series, the Australianised Cruze was built at Holden's Elizabeth assembly plant in South Australia and went on sale in Australia and New Zealand in March 2011. The Australian-built Cruze diverted from the global model in appearance and in features, receiving a facelift and additional mechanical and feature updates in 2013. Holden ceased production of the model in 2016, replacing it with the fifth-generation Opel Astra hatch variant and 2016 second-generation Cruze sedan in February 2017, sold together in both Australia and New Zealand under the Astra nameplate.

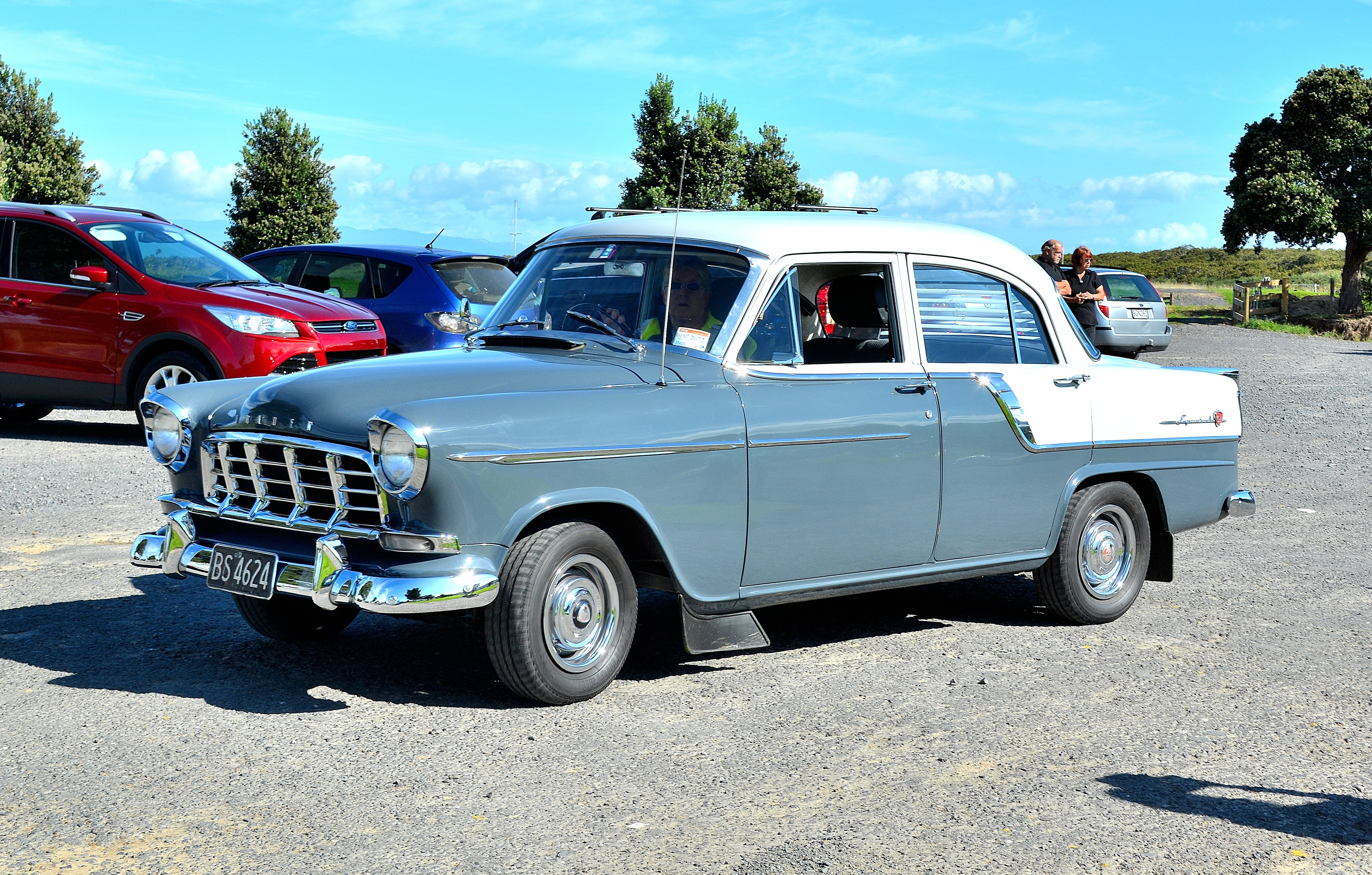
1958 FE Holden Special sedan, the first Holden model to be assembled by GM New Zealand

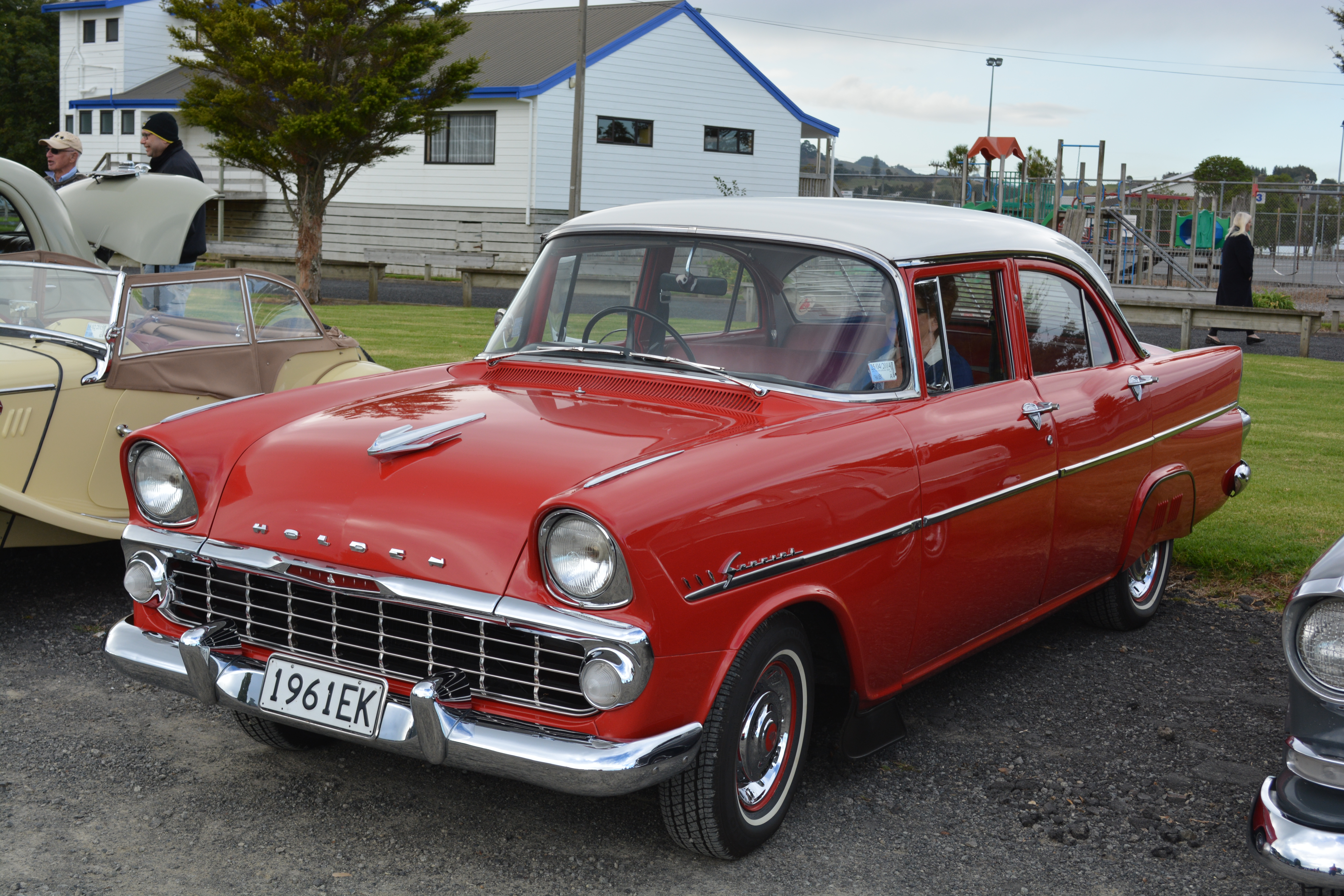
1961 EK Holden Special (New Zealand)

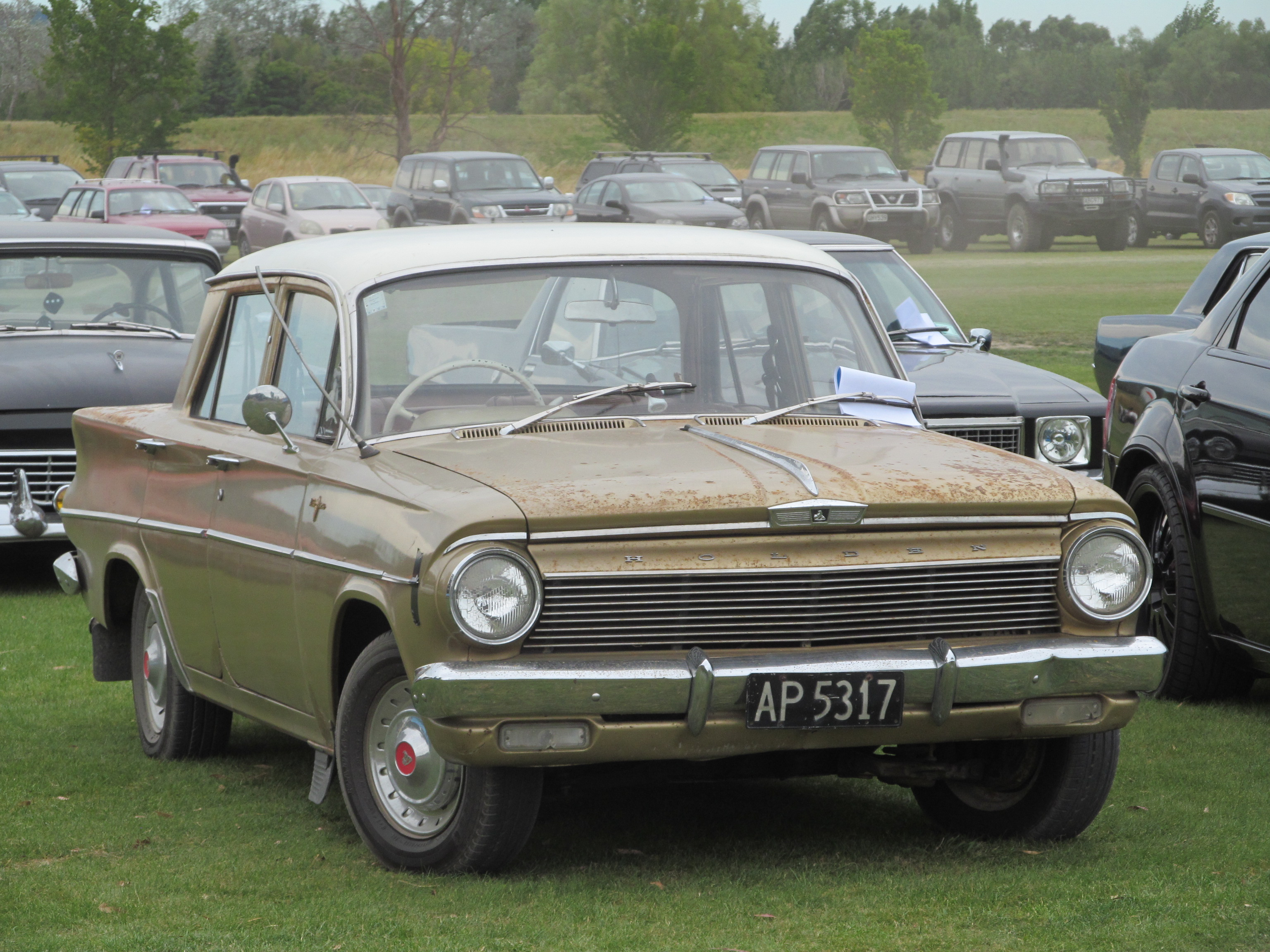
1963 EJ Holden sedan (New Zealand)

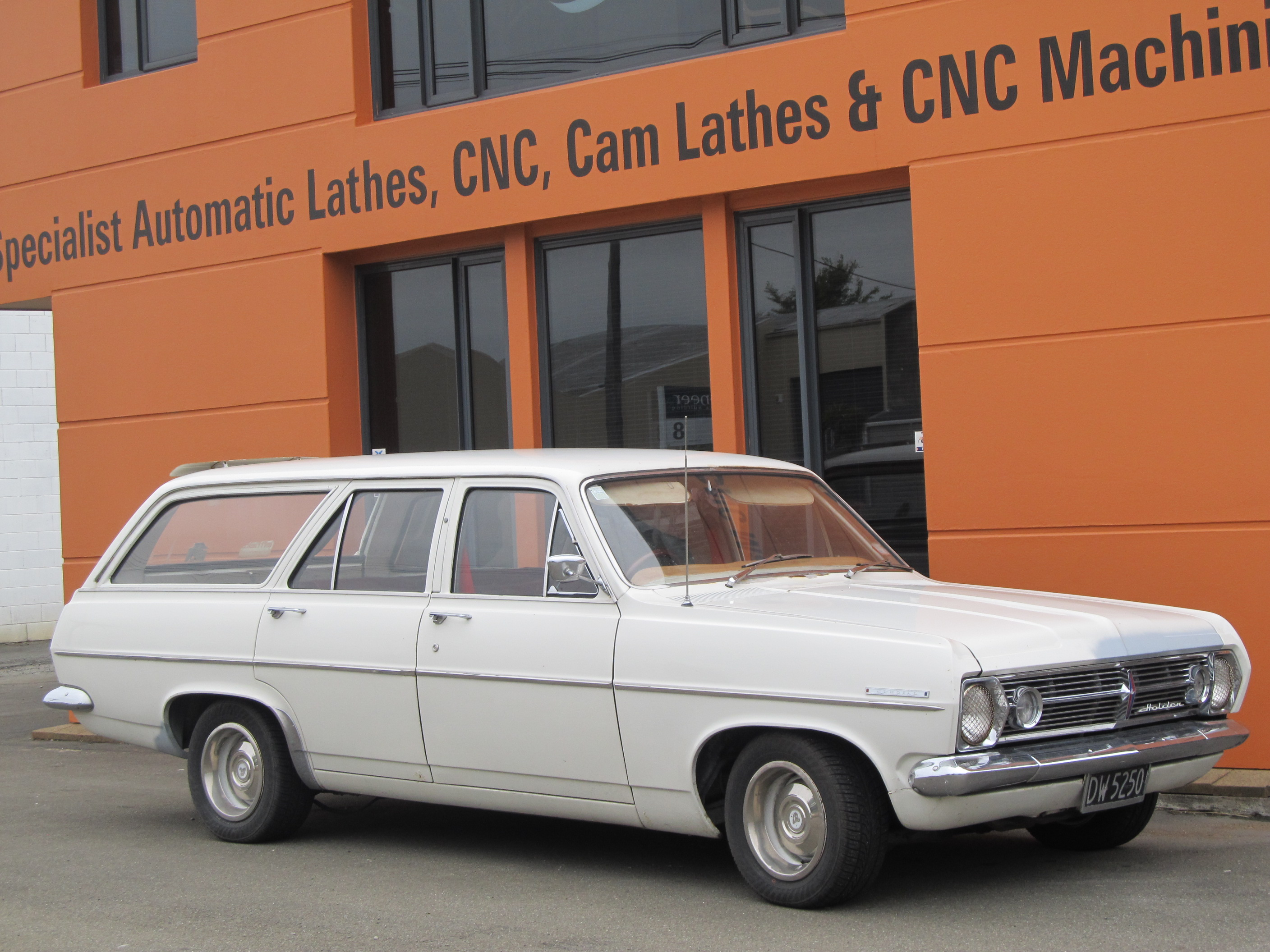
1966 HR Holden Special station wagon (New Zealand)

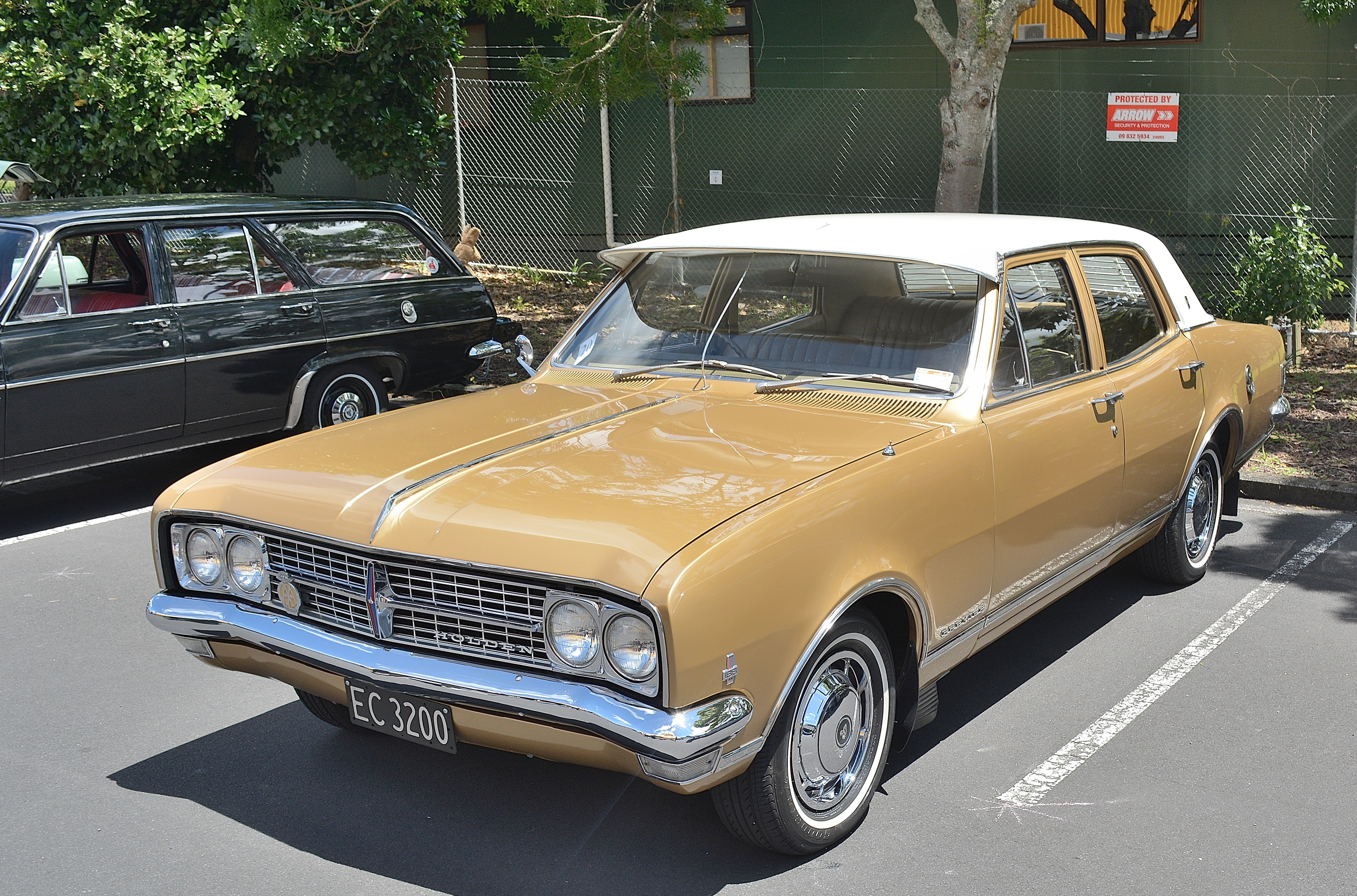
1968 Holden Premier (New Zealand)

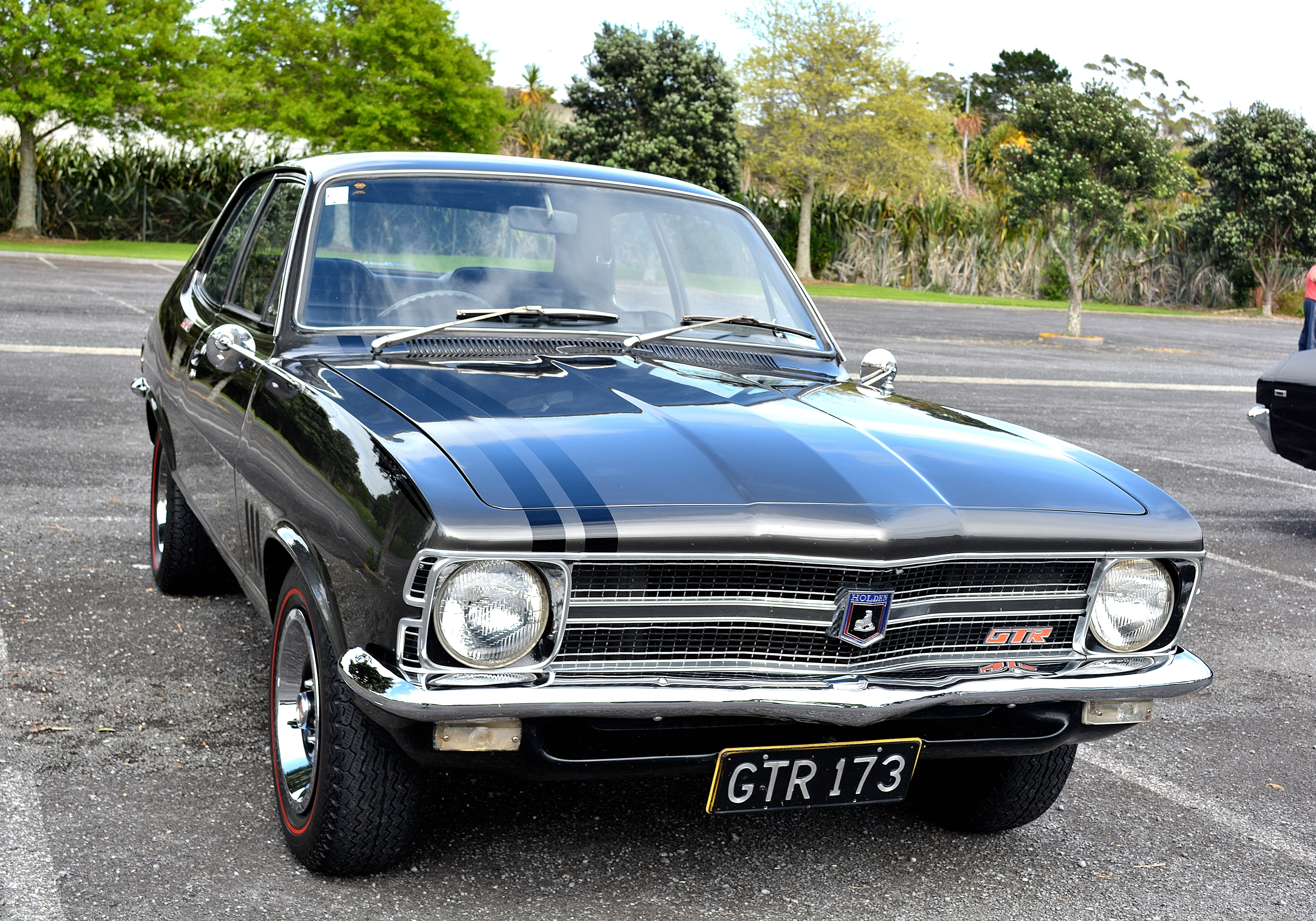
Vauxhall Viva-based 1971 Holden Torana (New Zealand)

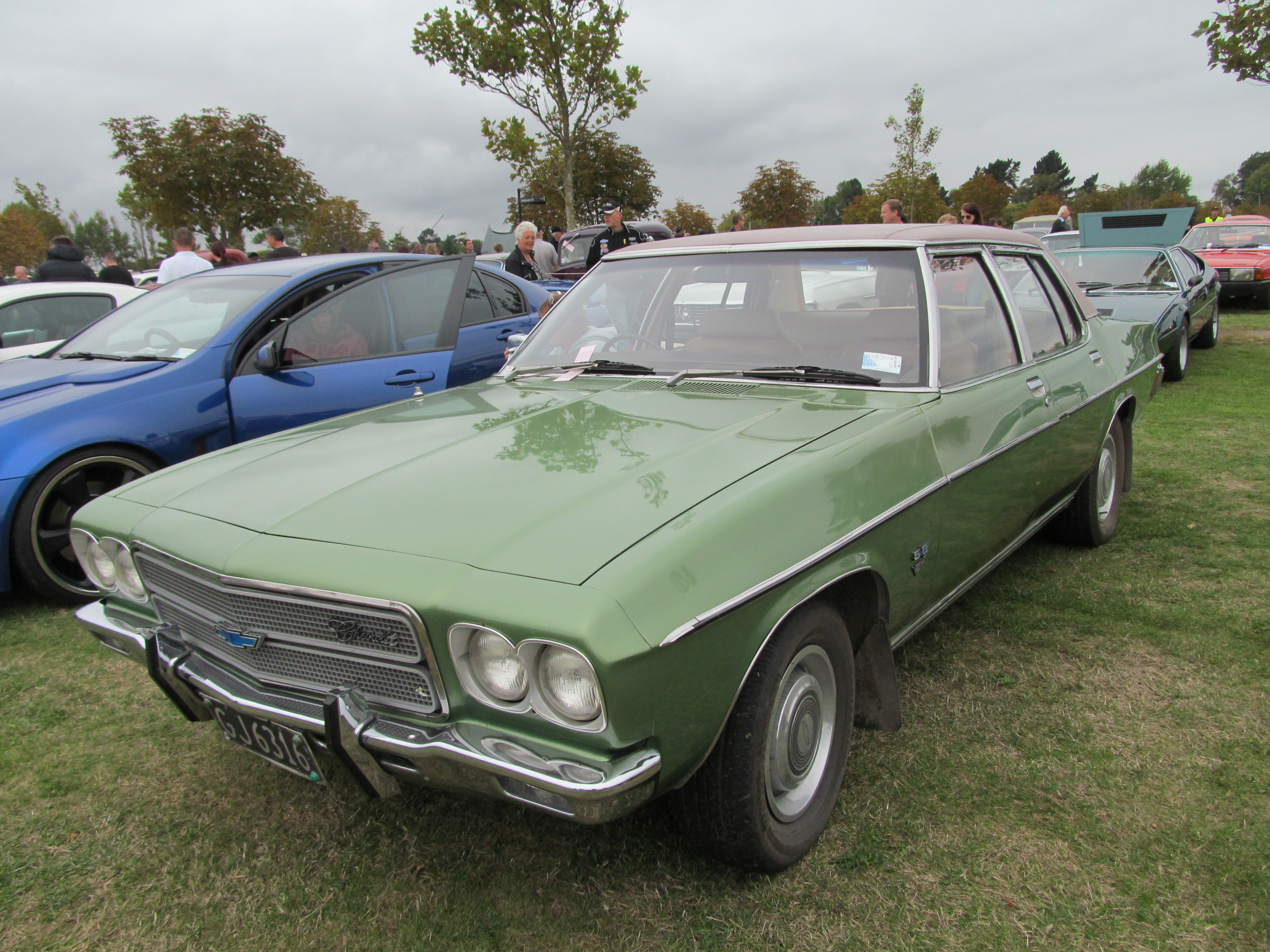
Chevrolet 350 sedan (New Zealand)

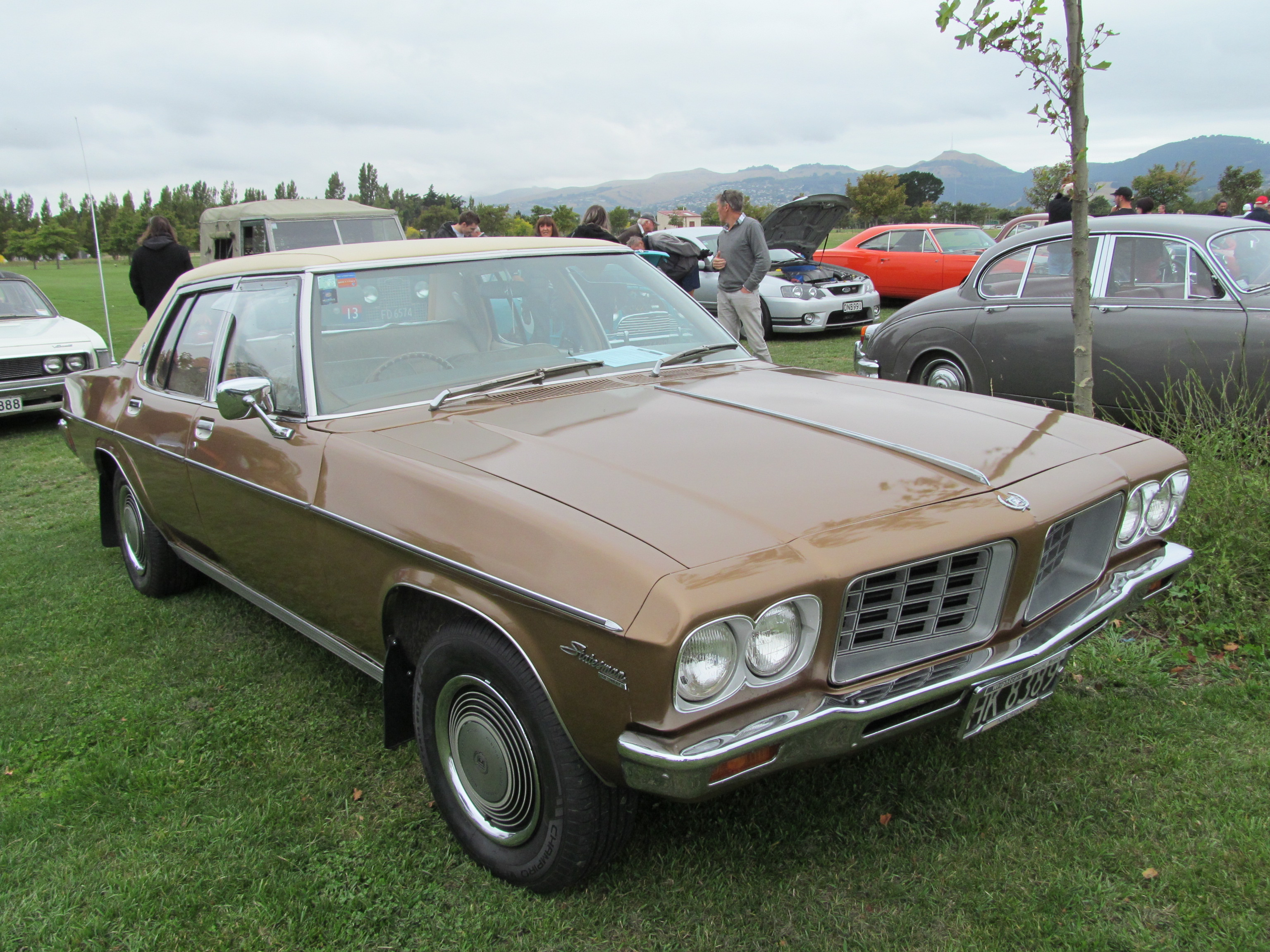
Statesman de Ville (HQ) (New Zealand)

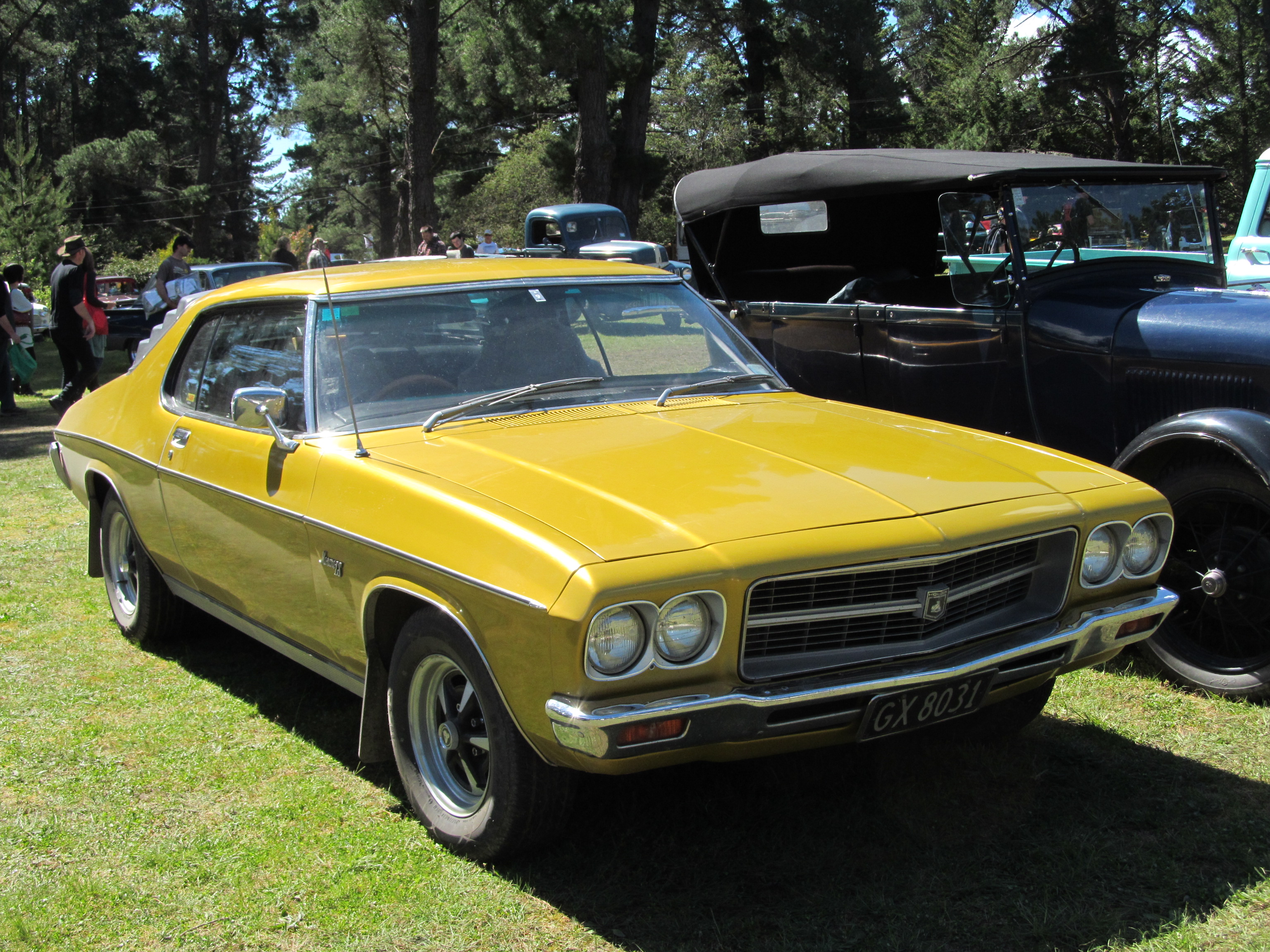
1973 HQ Holden Monaro. The Monaro was not built in NZ but was fully imported from Australia

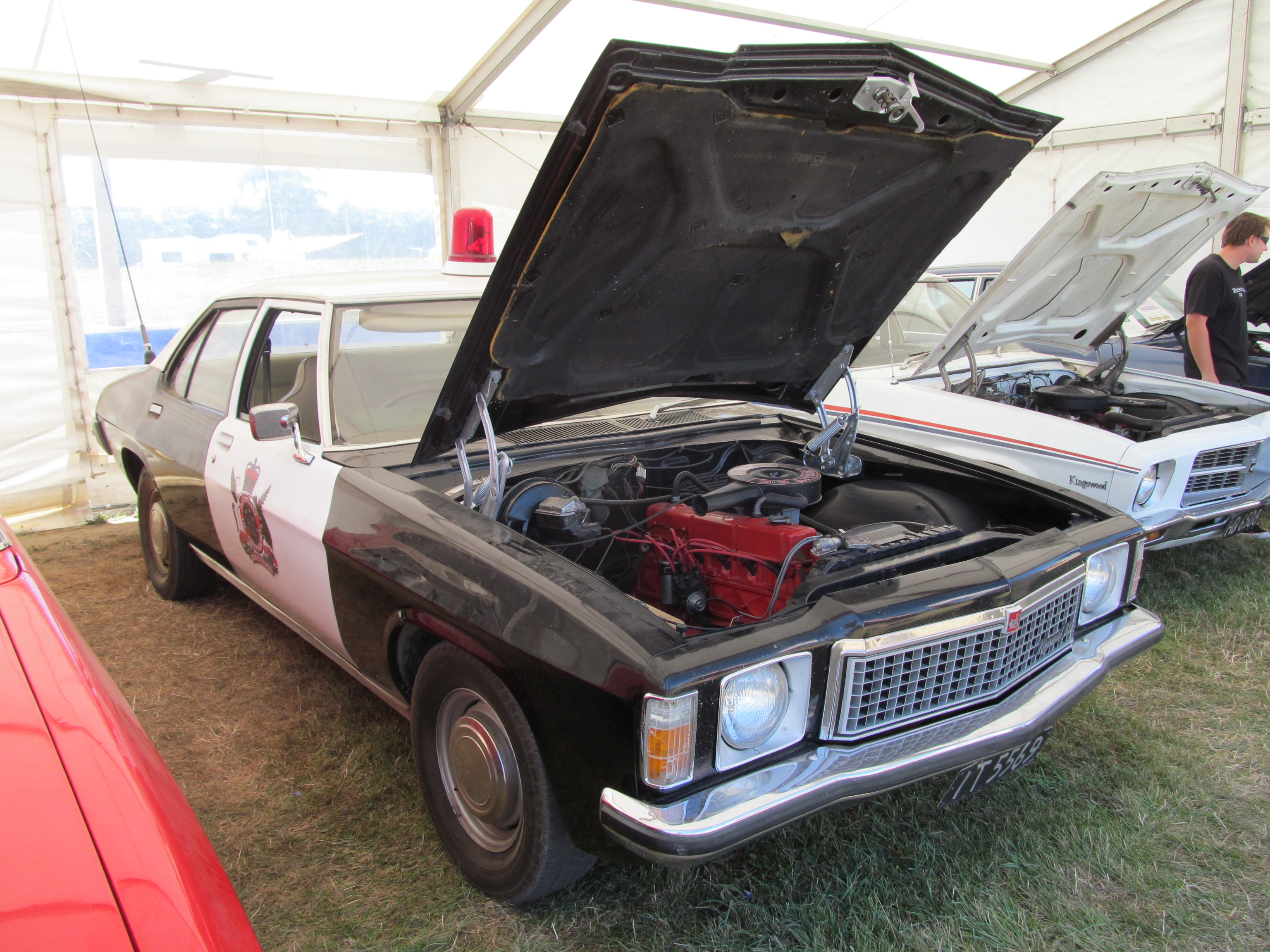
1978 Holden Kingswood MOT Police car (New Zealand)

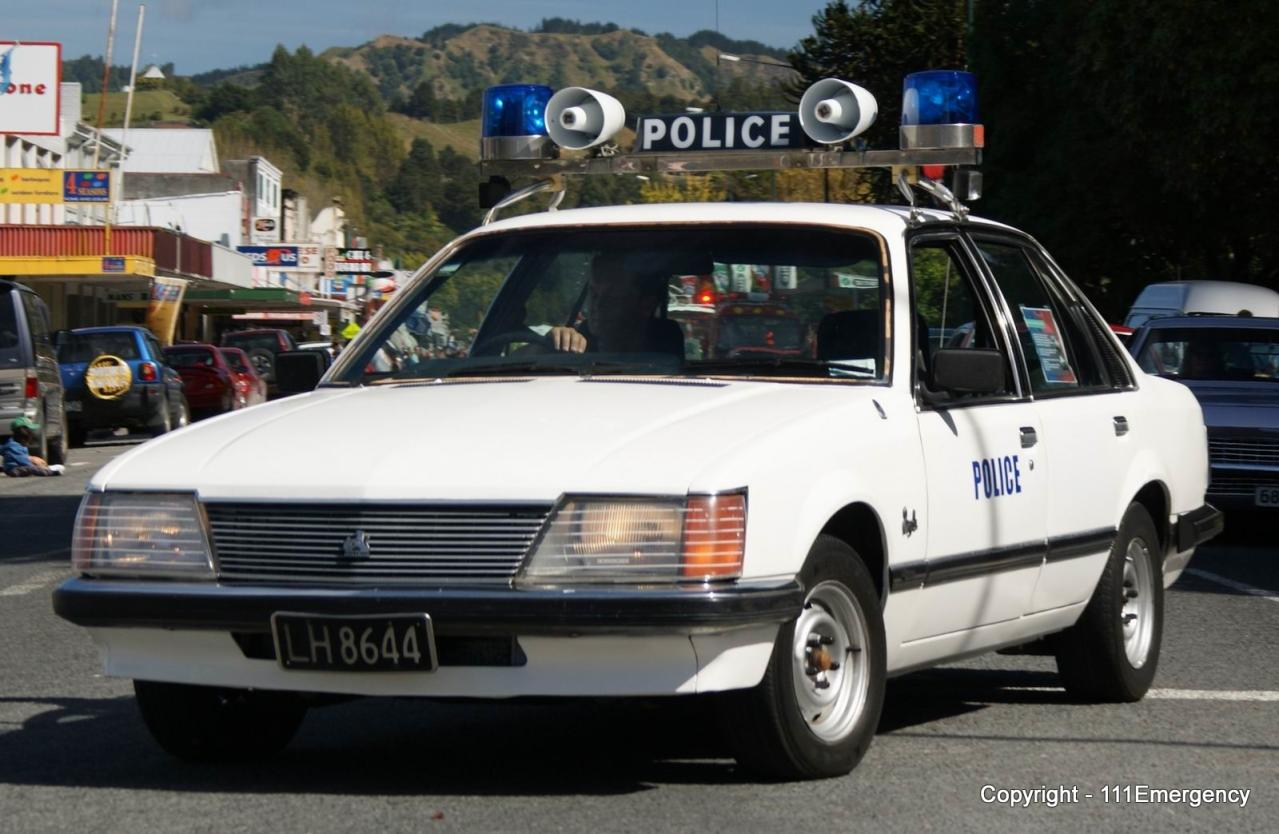
1981-1984 New Zealand-only Holden Commodore Royale (New Zealand Police)

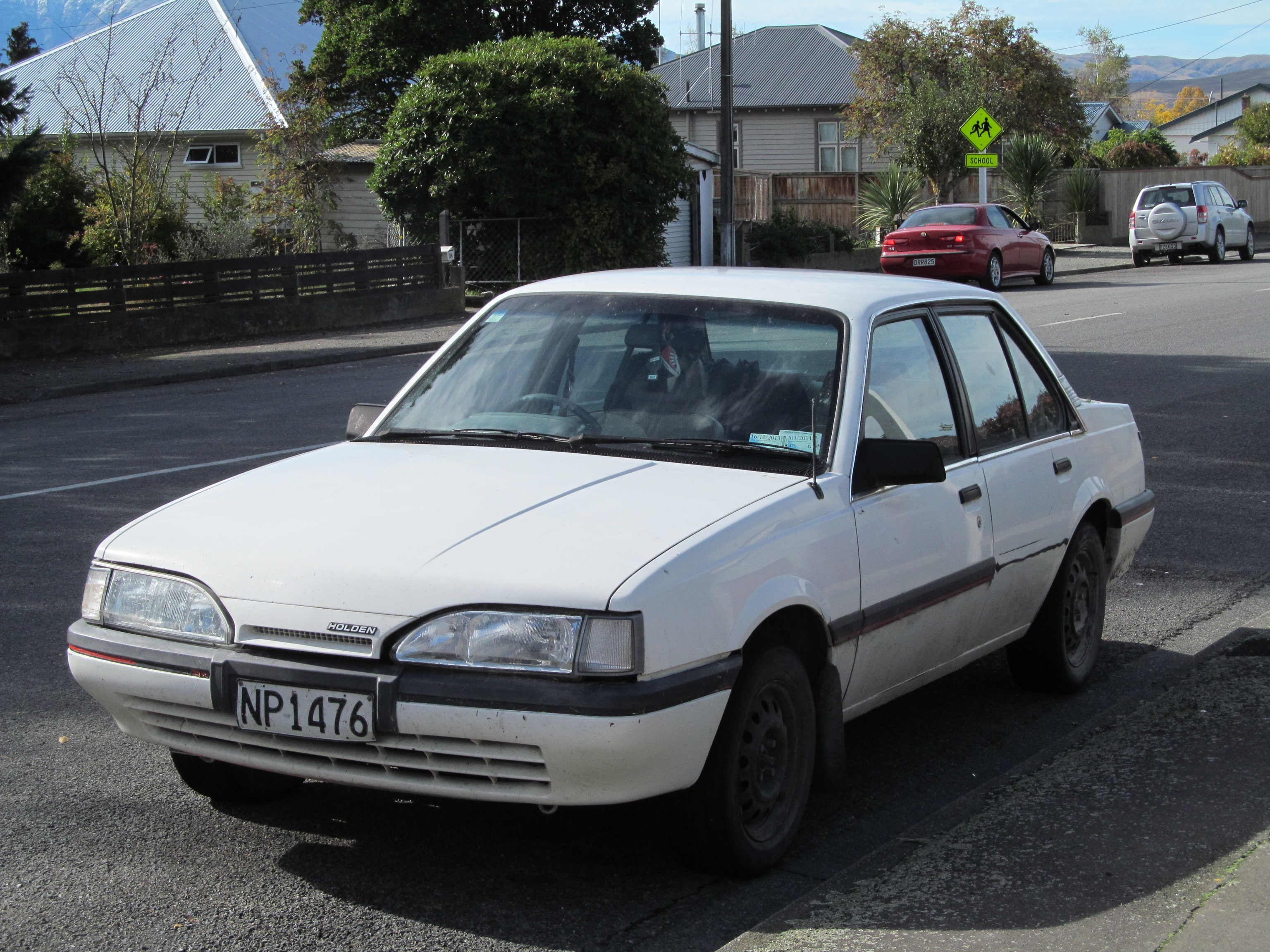
1988 JE Holden Camira SL-X. The previous Camira model in New Zealand was a rebadged Isuzu JJ

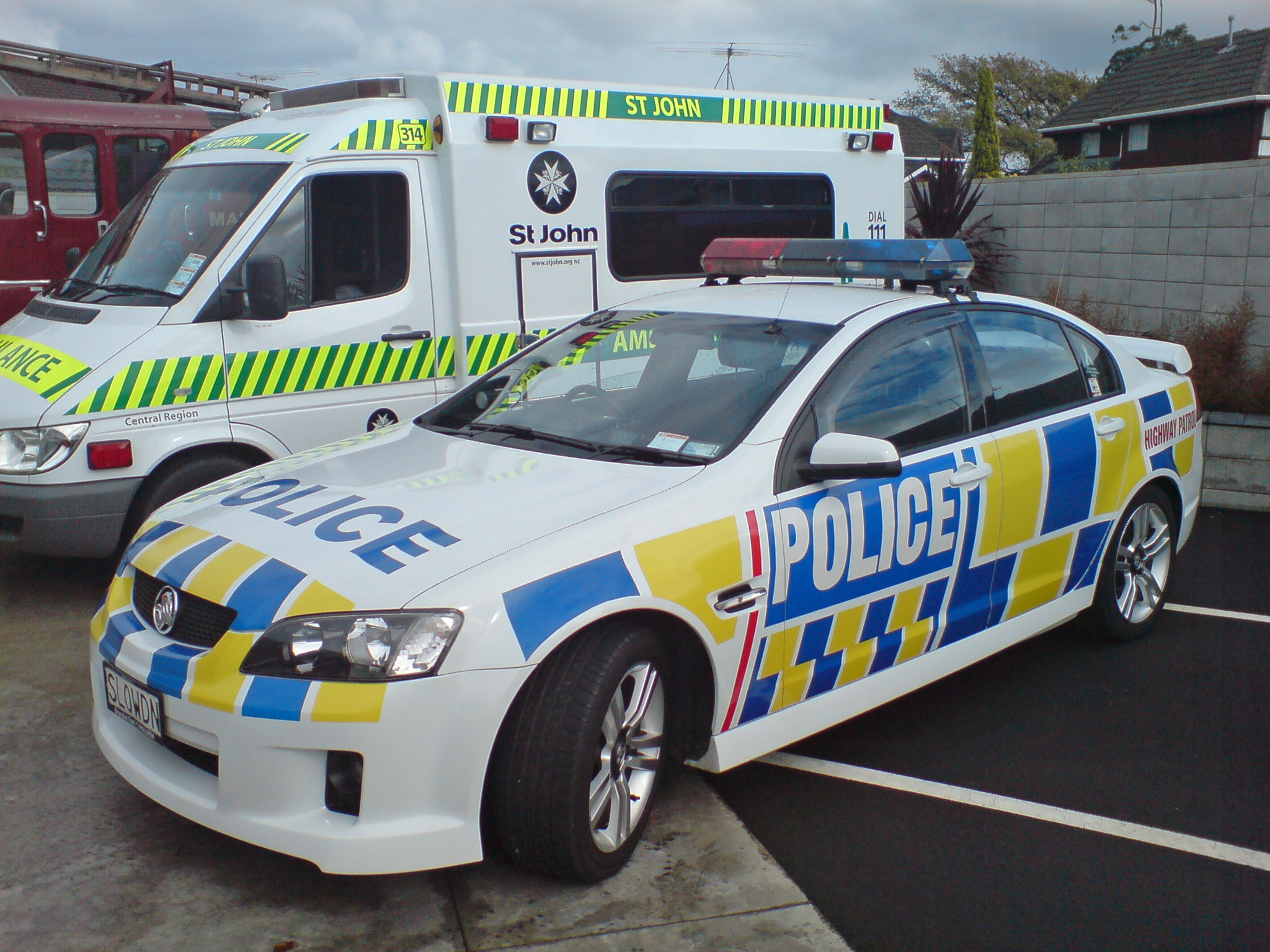
2006-2008 Holden VE Commodore SV6 sedan (New Zealand Police)

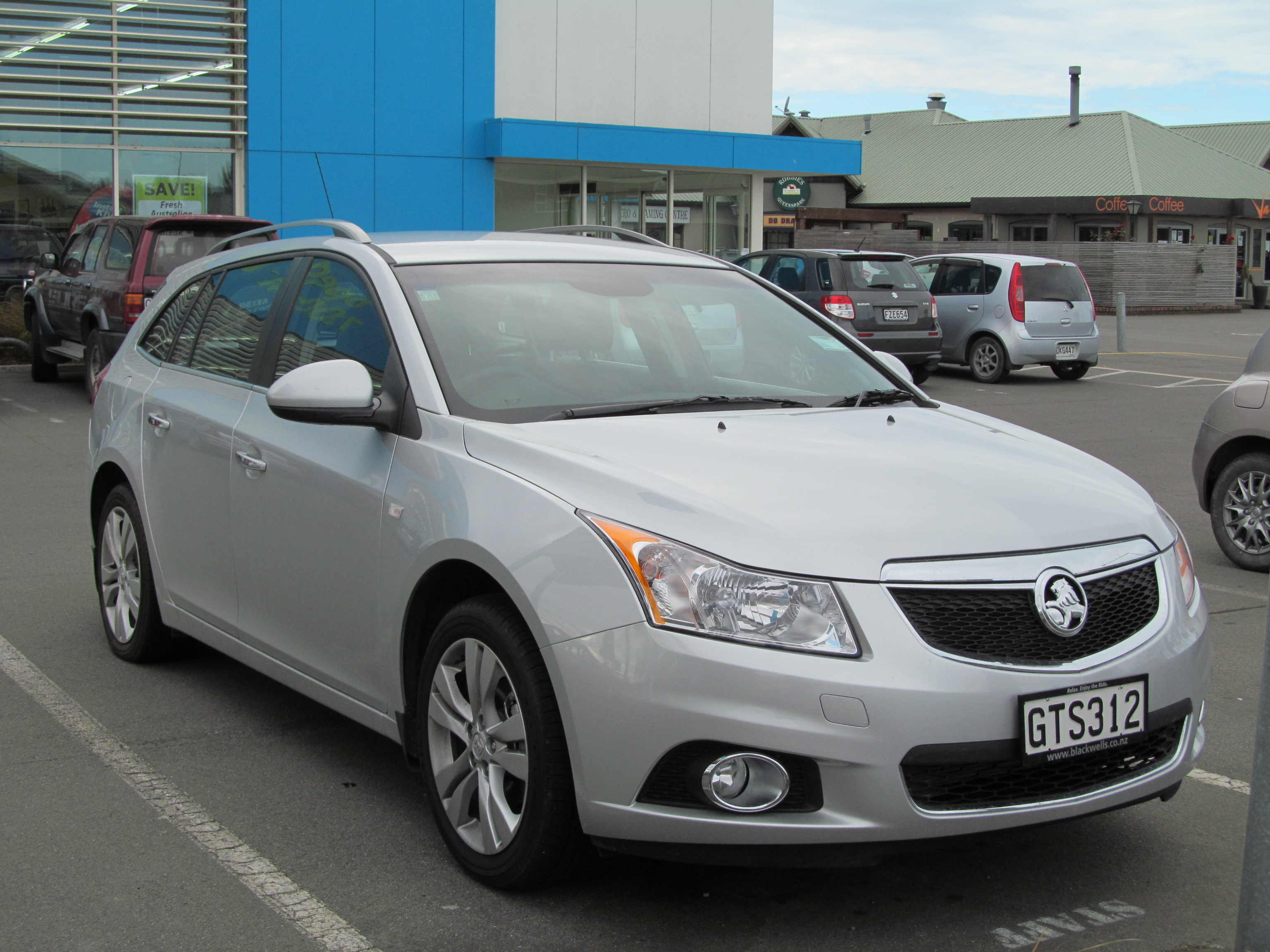
2013 "Series II" JH Holden Cruze station wagon (New Zealand)

=== Opel ===
During the 1980s Holden's future became uncertain. In around 1985, there were strong rumours, and a GM report, that indicated that Holden Australia would cease to exist in its current form and that its models would be exclusively designed offshore. Certainly what was happening in Australia did not instil confidence: rebadged Suzukis, Nissans and Isuzus were occupying the bottom end of the range, while the Commodore was about to shift to a Japanese-designed 3-litre engine. To avoid getting caught up in Holden Australia's woes, General Motors New Zealand pondered the reintroduction of other GM brands for its own market. As a result, GMNZ turned to Europe and to Opel. With this, Opel made a small reintroduction into New Zealand with a limited selection of highly priced European models: the Opel Kadett GSi, Ascona GT, Senator, Manta, and Monza. At the same time Holden in Australia was developing the fourth-generation VK Commodore which was a hybrid of the Opel Senator and Opel Rekord Series E.

From 1989 until 1994 the British-built Opel Vectra A (Vauxhall Cavalier Mark III in Britain) was sold in New Zealand as an Opel; it was rebadged as a Holden until 1996 when the model was replaced by the Vectra B, also badged as Holden.

Holden Australia produced the Vectra B from 1998 to 1999 at their plant in Elizabeth, South Australia for export to other RHD markets as well as domestically. Exports included to New Zealand. The Vectra B was produced internationally until 2002.

The Opel Astra F was introduced in New Zealand in 1995, also branded as a "Holden" even though identical Opel-badged models imported second hand from Japan were already being sold locally. (These Opel models were not released in Australia, as Holden in Australia was still selling rebadged versions of the Toyota Camry and Corolla as the Holden Apollo and Nova as a result of model-sharing under the Australian government's Button car plan. Australia received the Astra F in 1996, a year after New Zealand. This was the third generation "Astra" for Australia, the first two generations being rebadged Nissan Pulsars during the 1980s.)

Early models of the Astra and Vectra in New Zealand differed from those eventually sold in Australia, in that they retained the distinctive 'V' grille used by Vauxhall in the UK. Later on this was changed to bring the New Zealand model range in line with Australia.

From the late 1990s and throughout the 2000s, Holden New Zealand mirrored Holden Australia in selling badge-engineered Opel models as "Holden" including the 1989–1996 Holden Calibra (Opel Calibra), 1994–2000 Holden Barina (Opel Corsa B), and 1995–2009 Holden Astra (Opel Astra). The Opel Vectra C was sold unchanged between 2003 and 2007 even though the European model received a major facelift in September 2005. This was due to Opel stockpiling Vectras from 2005 for the Australasian markets resulting in an excess of exports that lasted through to 2007.

Holden in Australia launched the XC series Opel Combo van in September 2002, badged as "Holden." Although European production ended in the end of 2011, Holden in Australia and New Zealand stockpiled sufficient Combo inventory to last until 2013, with the final 2011 build vehicles complianced in the beginning of 2012. The last Combo sold in New Zealand was in 2013 with no replacement.

The Australasian market received the European Opel Antara as part of the Holden Captiva range of vehicles from 2006 until October 2015. When introduced in November 2006 after being announced the previous September, the Antara-based Holden was known as the "Captiva MaXX", selling alongside the cheaper GM Korea-sourced Chevrolet Captiva based Holden models.

Vauxhall's sporty all-wheel-drive Insignia VXR, itself a rebadged Opel Insignia OPC (Opel Performance Center) was marketed in Australia and New Zealand in 2015 as the Holden Insignia VXR. The Opel model, introduced in Europe in 2009, had always been powered by an Australian-built 2.8-litre V6 engine which was again used in the British Vauxhalls and Australian Holdens. Holden New Zealand's managing director at the time, Kristian Aquilina, said "This German designed and engineered AWD vehicle is loaded with technology you would expect only from premium European brands. It signals an exciting future direction for Holden product." The vehicle introduced three new technologies to Holden showrooms: adaptive cruise control, lane change alert, and auto emergency braking.

After Holden vehicle manufacturing ended in Australia at the end of 2017, Holden Australia chose the second generation Opel Insignia to become the new ZB Commodore, a decision that would be extremely controversial in its homeland, but not so in New Zealand. The backlash from the Australian public resulted in dismal sales of the ZB in Australia, whereas the ZB sold well in New Zealand and was the top-selling passenger car in March 2018, according to data supplied by the New Zealand Motor Industry Association (MIA).

Opel and Vauxhall were purchased by PSA Group in March 2017. Shortly thereafter PSA announced that all GM-based Opel and Vauxhall products would eventually be retired in favour of new models developed on its platforms. News of this decision was another cause of damage to consumer confidence in Australia because of the possibility of the ZB Commodore becoming an "instant orphan." On 17 October 2018, Holden in Australia halted production on the ZB Commodore due to slow sales and unsold inventory at its dealerships. The ZB Commodore continued to be sold in New Zealand during 2019 (from leftover stock.) Holden finally announced in December 2019 that the ZB Commodore would be discontinued, and then in February 2020 General Motors made their announcement that they were pulling out of the right-hand-drive market fully and ending the Holden marque.

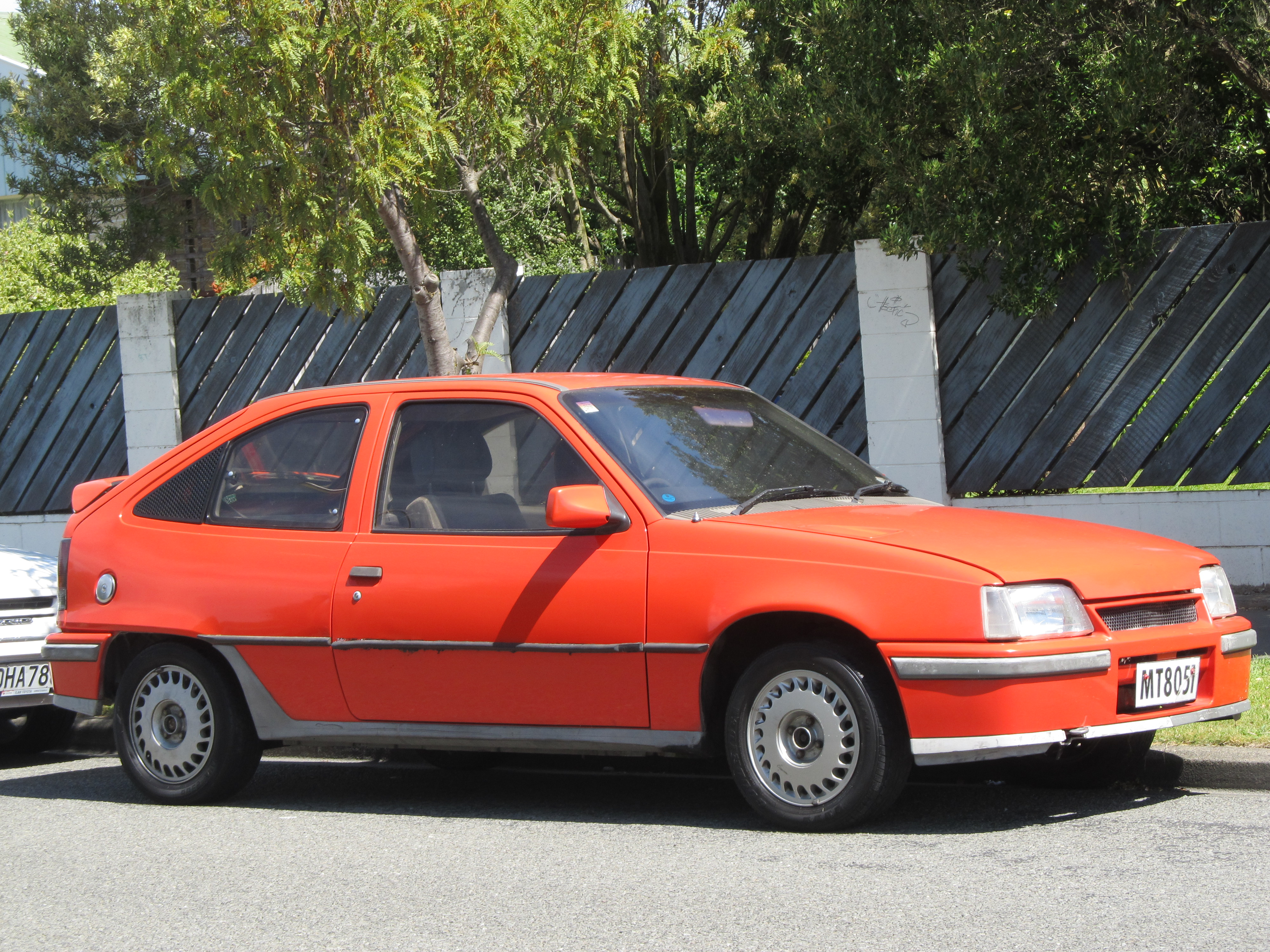
1986 Opel Kadett GSi (New Zealand)

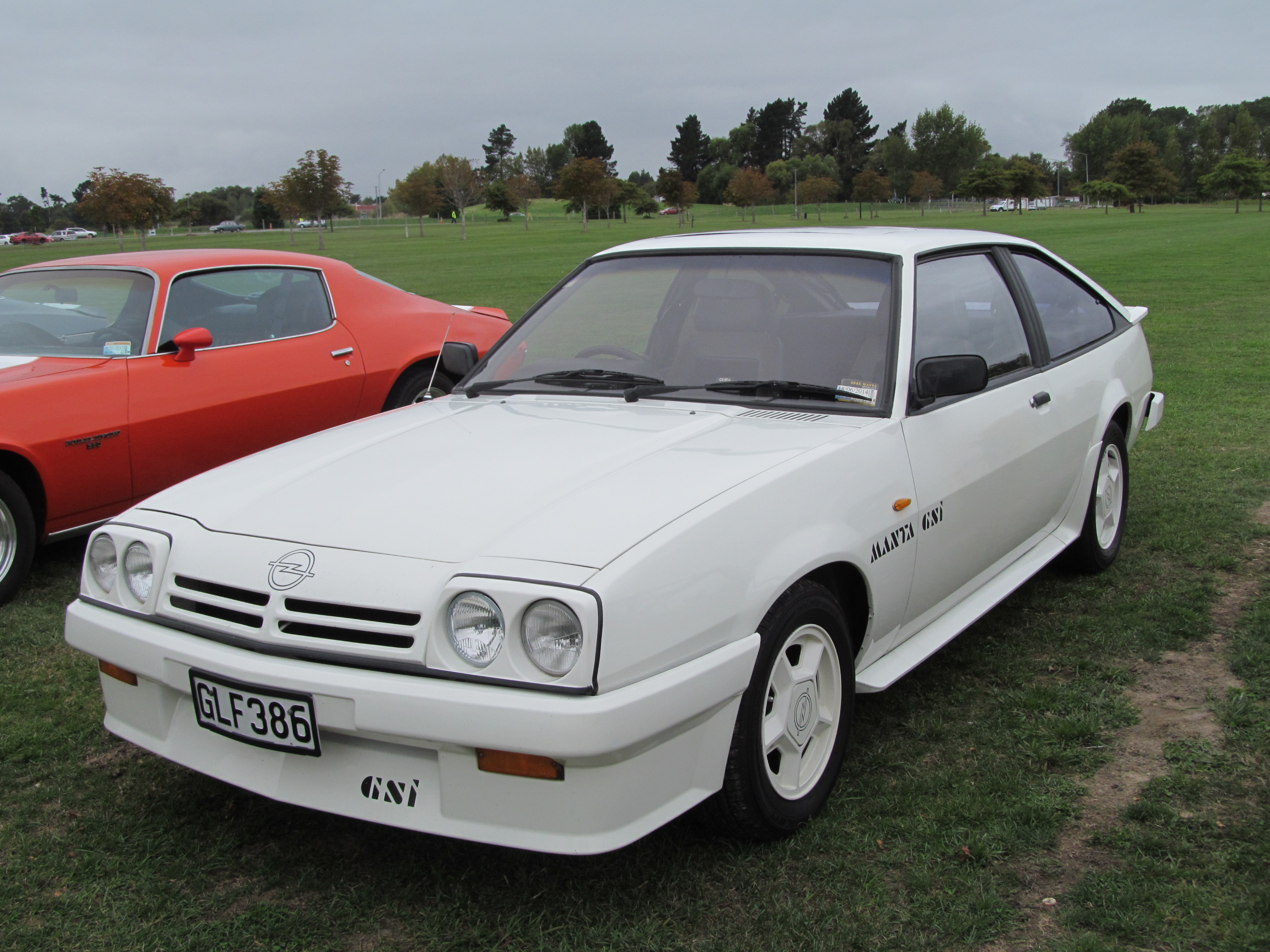
1987 Opel Manta GSi. Briefly sold in New Zealand during the 1980s

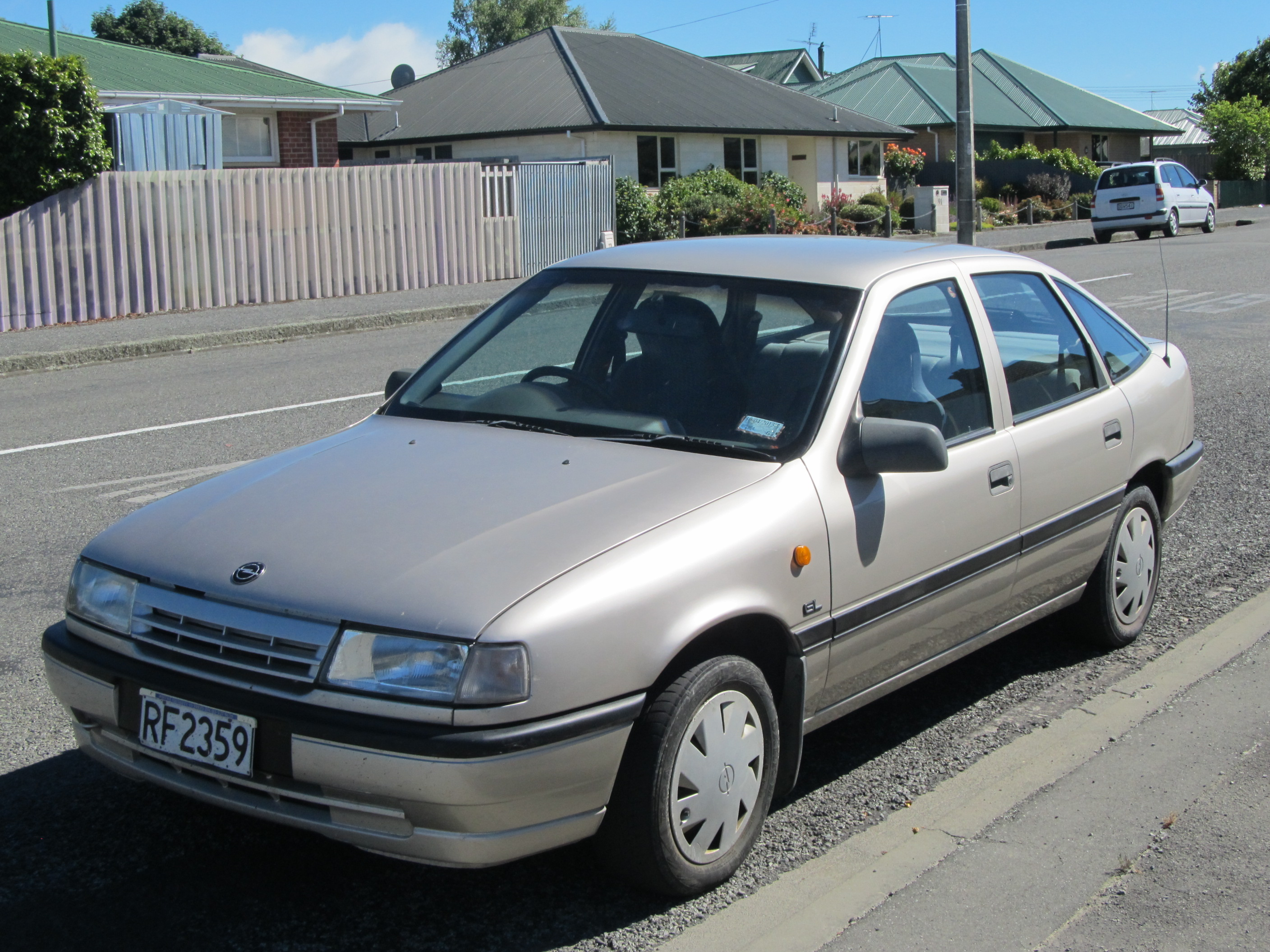
1990 Opel Vectra (New Zealand)

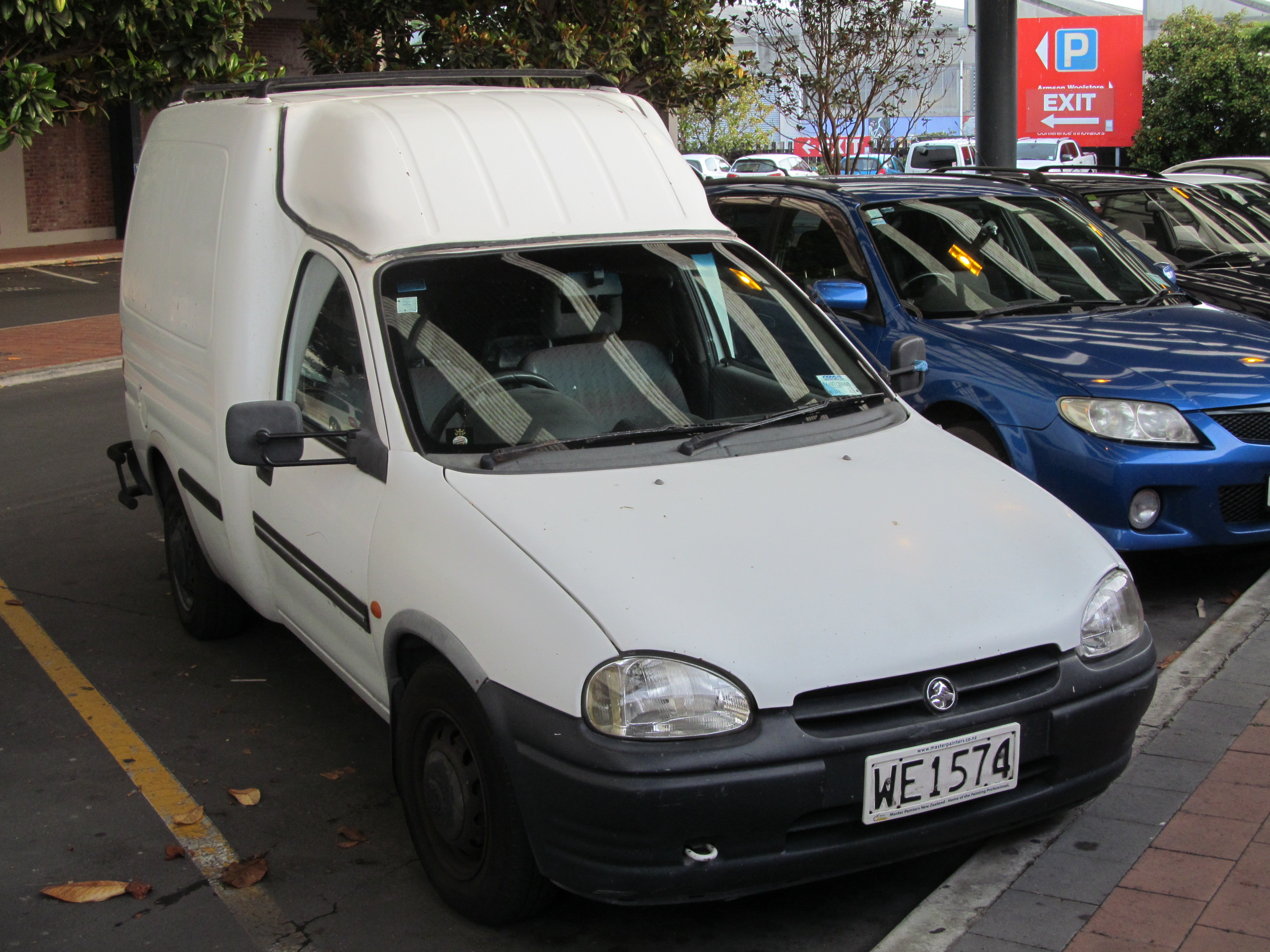
1997 Holden Combo van (New Zealand)

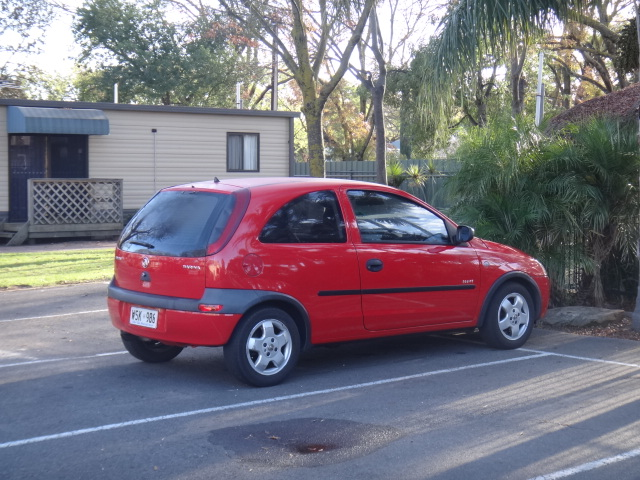
2002 XC Holden Barina 3-door hatchback (Opel Corsa C)

=== Daewoo/GM Korea ===
In 1988 GM New Zealand brought in the Opel Kadett-based Daewoo LeMans from Daewoo of South Korea to replace the Holden Gemini. As the Opel name was not available to it, GMNZ instead opted for Pontiac, as research showed that the brand had a good reputation in New Zealand, despite most people associating it with bigger cars, and the Daewoo Le Mans was badged as the Pontiac LeMans as in the US and Canada. It was marketed on the appeal of the Pontiac name being "American" despite the car's origins and place of manufacture. By contrast, the model was not sold in Australia until 1994, where it was branded the Daewoo 1.5i.

Following the bankruptcy of Daewoo and subsequent purchase of the company by General Motors at the end of 2002, both Holden Australia and Holden New Zealand each began selling Daewoo cars beginning in 2003, specifically the Daewoo Kalos and the Daewoo Lacetti, but sales were poor in both countries prompting Holden Australia to announce on 1 July 2004 they were stopping sales of Daewoo there with New Zealand following suit. Holden New Zealand's public affairs manager at the time, Aalbert van Ham, said it had been difficult to establish the brand in New Zealand and that the brand "had a chequered history." Daewoo ceased as a brand in New Zealand on 31 December 2004.

In January 2005, General Motors introduced the Chevrolet brand to Europe and the whole Daewoo range was simply re-badged as "Chevrolet." General Motors' official tagline was that: "Daewoo has grown up enough to become Chevrolet." The only markets where Daewoo products were not badged as Chevrolet thereafter were Australia and New Zealand.

Despite the recent negative reputation, Holden New Zealand, following Holden Australia's lead, immediately imported a full range of new Daewoo models from 2005, all wearing "Holden" badging, including:

- 2005–2011 Holden Barina (Daewoo Kalos),
- 2007–2011 Holden Epica (Daewoo Tosca),
- 2005–2008 Holden Viva (Daewoo Lacetti),
- 2008–2011 Holden Cruze (Daewoo Lacetti),
- 2006–2018 Holden Captiva (Daewoo Winstorm.)

In 2011 General Motors renamed Daewoo as GM Korea. All GM Korea vehicles continued to be marketed internationally as "Chevrolet" with the sole exceptions continuing to be Australia and New Zealand.

The Korean-built Chevrolet Trax was sold globally from 2012. It was first sold in Canada, Mexico, Germany, South Korea, Lebanon, United Arab Emirates, and Europe. It was sold in New Zealand and Australia from 2013; in China, Indonesia and Philippines from 2014; and eventually the United States from 2015. A 2017 facelift saw the Trax take styling cues from the Korean-built Malibu and Volt. The Trax was sold in Holden's final year in New Zealand as the Holden Trax LTZ.

The GM Korea-built, 8th generation Chevrolet Malibu was sold in New Zealand as the Holden Malibu from 2013 to 2014, replacing the Korean-built Epica, and positioned between the Australian-built Series II Cruze and Commodore range. The Malibu served mainly as a fleet vehicle in New Zealand.

Although dropped in Australia in 2018, New Zealand still continued to sell the Korean-built Spark until the demise of the Holden marque in 2020.

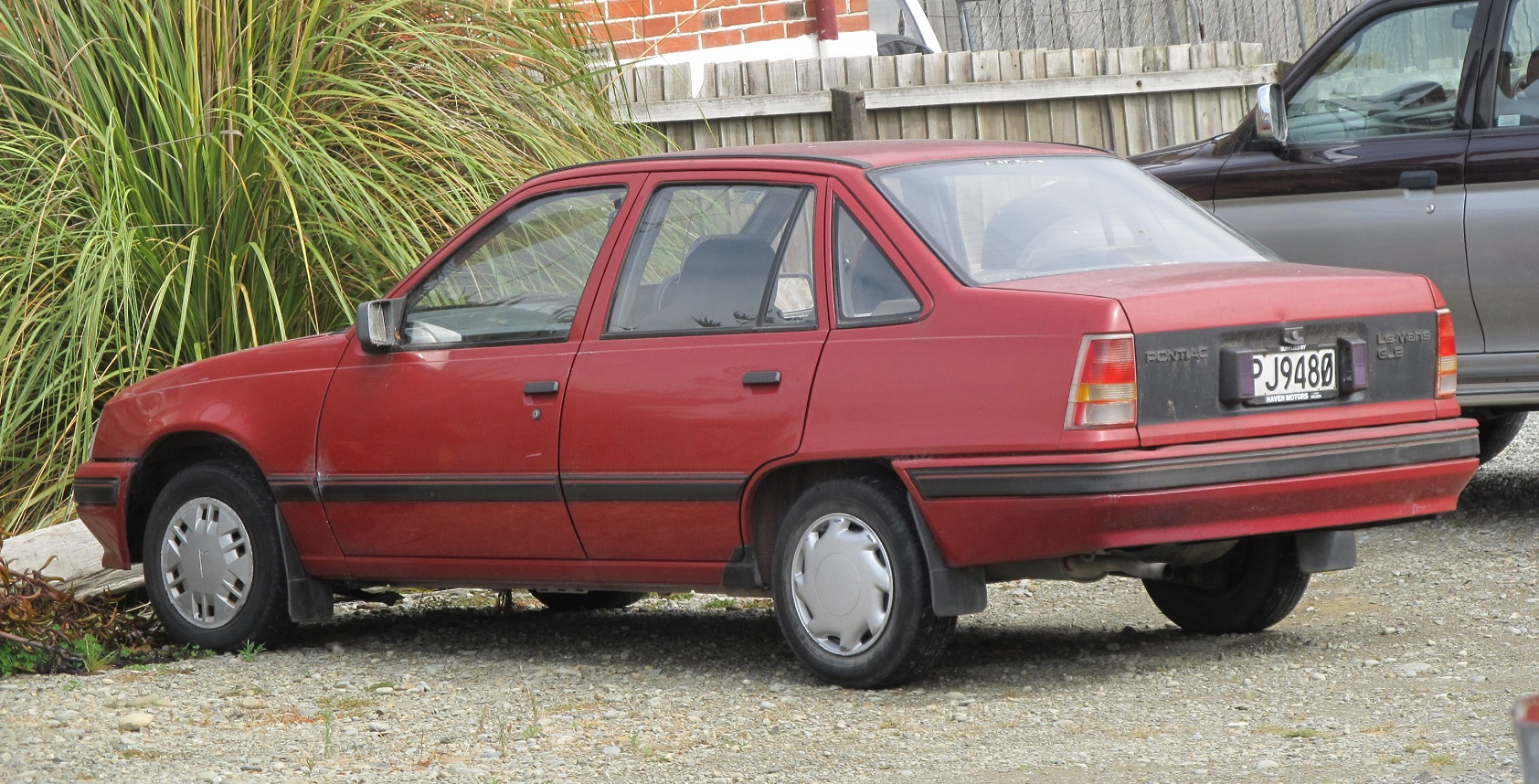
1989 Pontiac LeMans GLE Sedan (New Zealand)

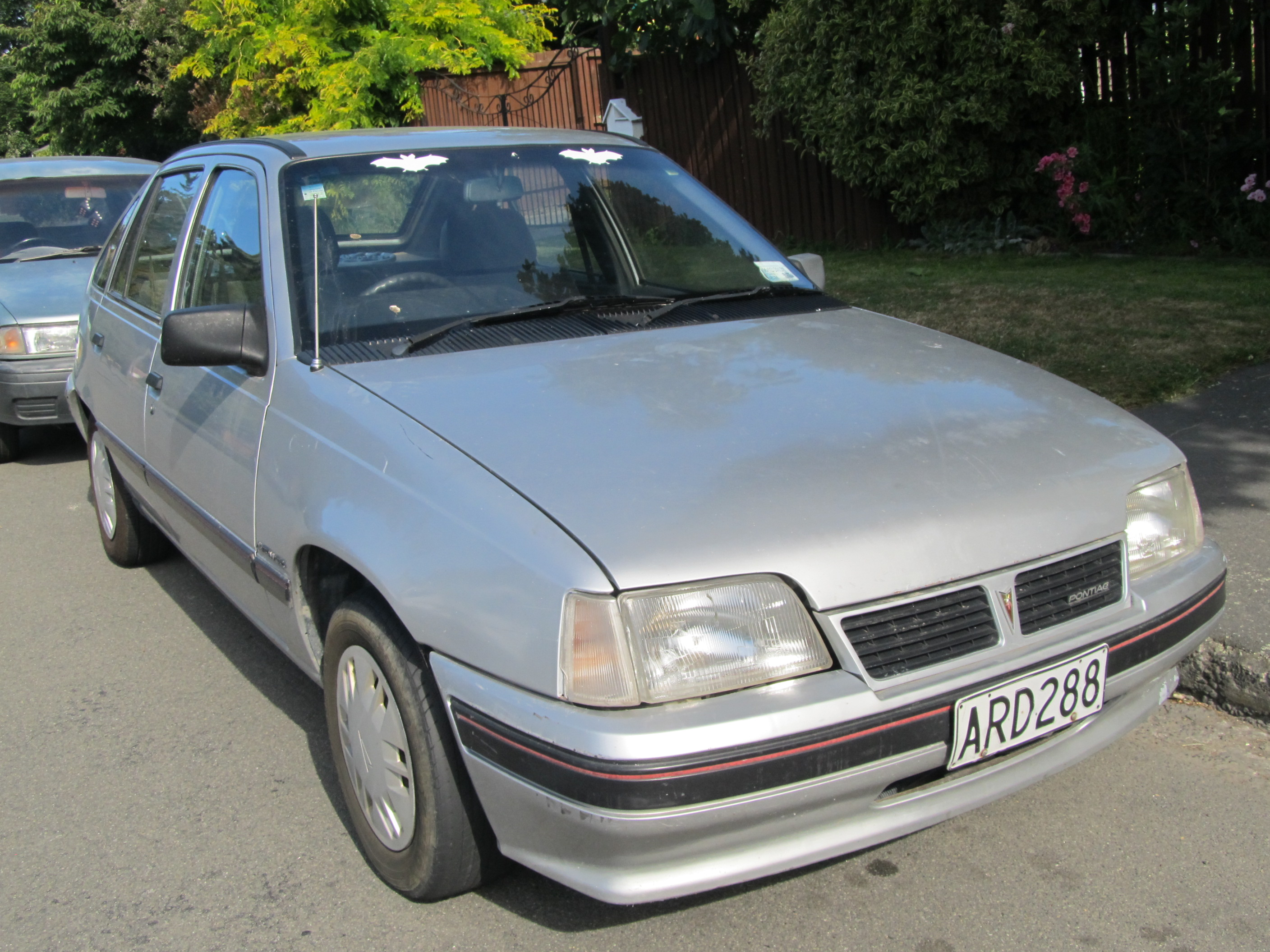
1990 Pontiac LeMans GSE hatchback (New Zealand)

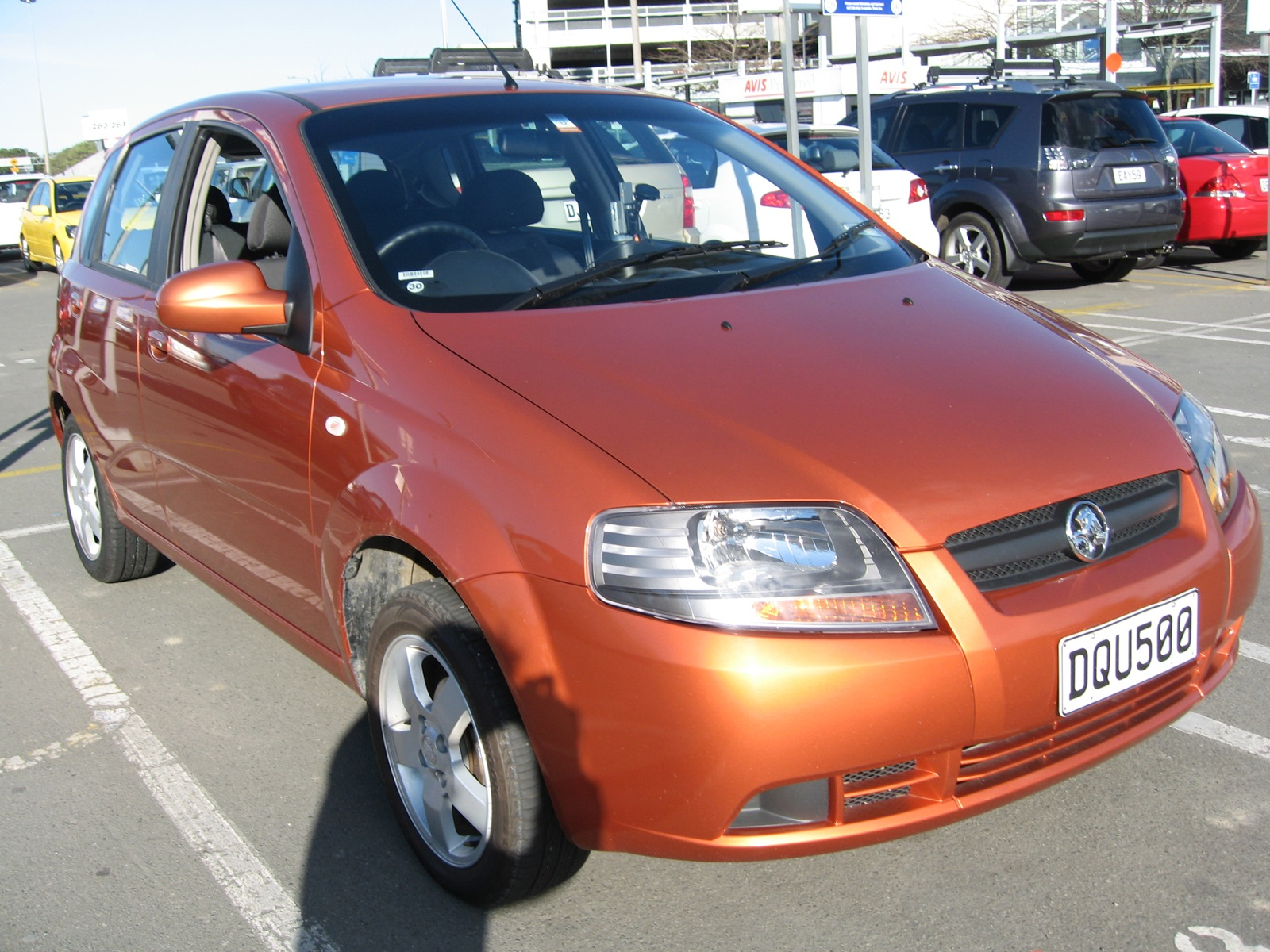
2006 Holden Barina, a rebadged Daewoo Kalos (New Zealand)

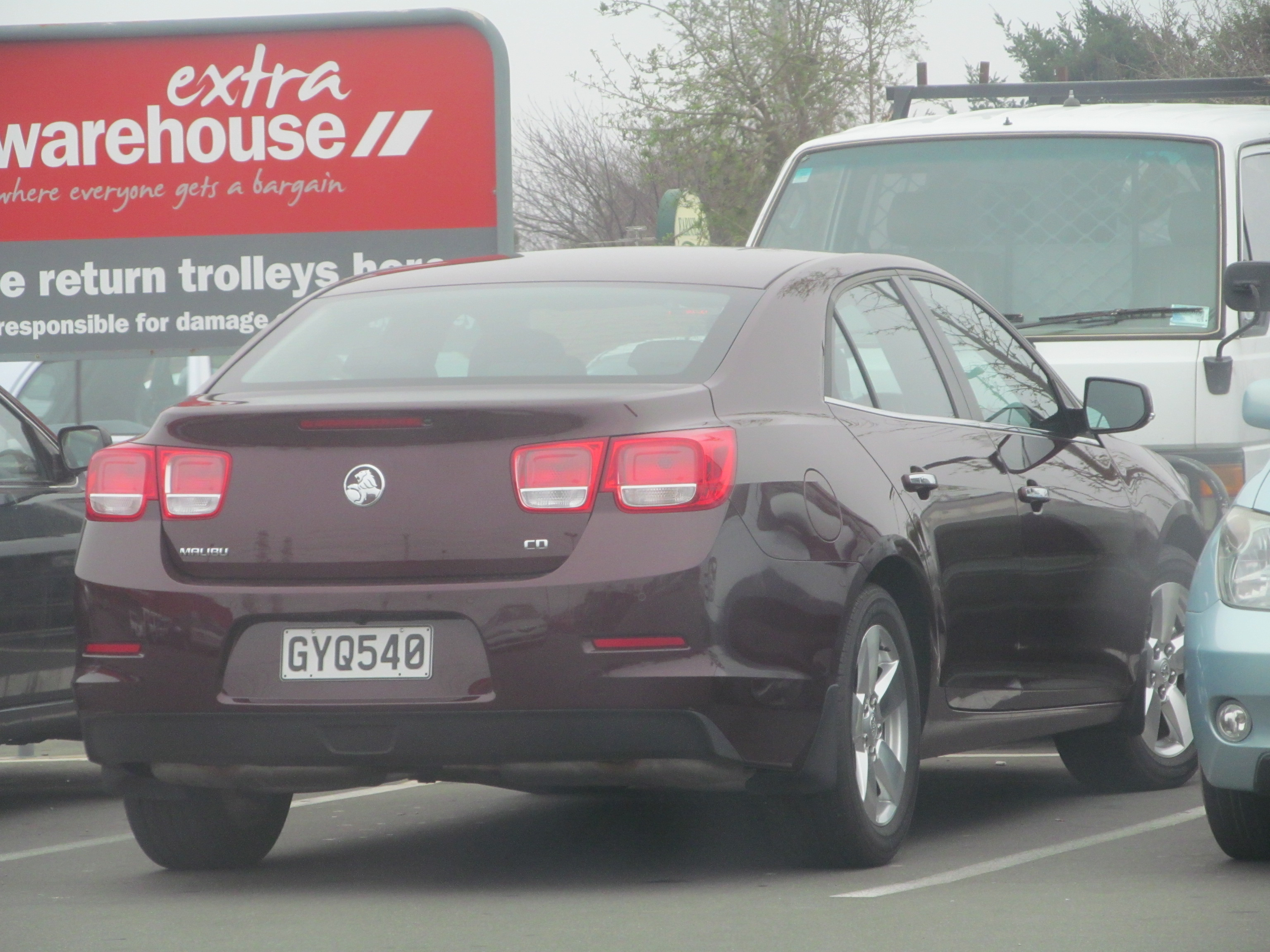
2013 Korean-built "Holden" Malibu, otherwise marketed internationally as a "Chevrolet"

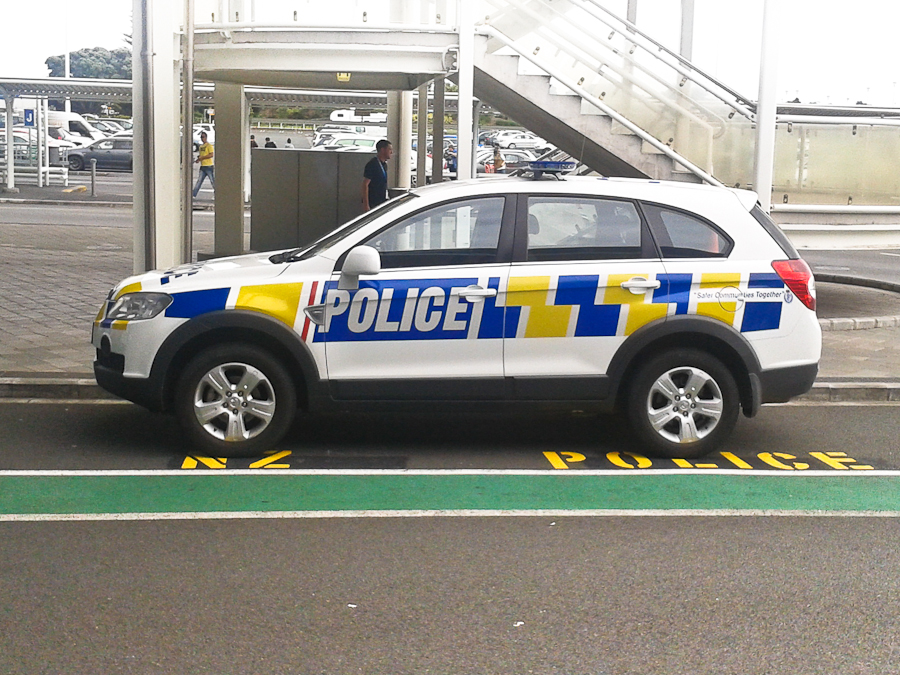
2012 Korean-built Holden Captiva (New Zealand Police)

=== Suzuki ===
1985 saw the introduction of the first-generation Holden Barina, actually a rebadged Suzuki Cultus/Swift. The model was assembled at the Trentham plant under contract for Suzuki New Zealand Limited until 1988.

The first-generation YG Holden Cruze introduced in 2002 was based on the second-generation Suzuki Ignis which was sold in Japan and other markets as the Chevrolet Cruze. The model was actually the work of Holden Australia under a joint venture between GM and Suzuki. While designed in Australia, it was manufactured at Suzuki's plant in Kosai, Shizuoka. It was essentially the body shell of the Ignis with a 1.5-litre, four-cylinder engine and either a five-speed manual or a four-speed automatic. The model was sold in Australia and New Zealand until 2006. However, due to the high number of grey imports in New Zealand from Japan, the Chevrolet version is quite commonly seen on New Zealand roads including the Japan-only model which continued to be built until 2008. The next generation Cruze was a rebadged Daewoo Lacetti which sold from 2008 to 2011.

=== GM ===
During the late 1980s, and with the uncertainty of Holden's future in Australia, General Motors New Zealand attempted to use other GM makes that produced right-hand-drive vehicles and have GM as the main brand for New Zealand. GMNZ brought in products by Opel, Isuzu, Daewoo, and Suzuki in addition to Holden in anticipation of Holden's demise. Commercial vehicles were branded as Isuzu.

General Motors New Zealand used the GM name in advertising, for example, the Holden Commodore was marketed as the "GM Holden Commodore", with the GM name and logo being used at the end of TV commercial instead of that of Holden. Similarly, the Opel Vectra was marketed as the "GM Opel Vectra". However, the marketing strategy created little brand loyalty and consumers did not accept GM as a brand, probably due to the multiple brands on offer.

=== Isuzu ===
Prior to GM's partnership with Isuzu in 1971, the Isuzu brand had been well-established in New Zealand through the assembly operations of Campbell Motor Industries in Thames who had assembled the Isuzu Bellett since the 1960s. General Motors gained a 34% stake in Isuzu in 1971 and engaged in joint-ventures with them across all GM networks for the next four decades.

A full range of Isuzu trucks and light commercial vehicles were available in New Zealand during Isuzu's partnership with General Motors. Select car models developed during the partnership were also sold in New Zealand in the same time period.

In 1977 the GM-Isuzu developed Isuzu Gemini was introduced in New Zealand and marketed as "Isuzu." The Gemini had been in production in neighbouring Australia since 1975 and had otherwise been marketed there as Holden from the beginning. The Gemini was assembled in New Zealand until 1984, with latter models eventually rebadged as Holden, in line with Australia.

The first-generation Isuzu Aska, sold internationally as the Isuzu JJ, was selected by GM New Zealand in 1984 to replace the Australian-built JB Holden Camira due to its bad reputation, and was sold from 1984 to 1987 as the JJ Camira. Australia continued to further improve its own model, releasing the JD Camira in the same time period. The Isuzu JJ was replaced by the new JE Australian Camira in 1987.

The first-generation (1981–1991) and second-generation (1991–2002) Isuzu Trooper off-road vehicle was rebadged in New Zealand as the Holden Jackaroo, although owing to the widespread availability of the identical Isuzu Bighorn as a used Japanese grey import, the Jackaroo name was used only on brand new models imported by Holden New Zealand. To complicate matters further, Troopers were also sold in New Zealand as Isuzu Trooper.

In April 1986 the first-generation Isuzu Piazza was introduced to Australia as the YB Holden Piazza (offered only in Turbo form.) The Piazza was one of Holden's biggest flops of the time and was dropped in Australia by 1988. In New Zealand it retained its Isuzu name.

The first generation Isuzu Fargo (1980–1985) was sold in New Zealand and Europe as the Isuzu WFR. In neighbouring Australia it was sold as the Holden Shuttle.

For a short period between early 1998 and late 1999, the Isuzu MU was sold new in New Zealand as the Isuzu Wizard. In Australia it was sold as the Holden Frontera.

From January 1981 until 2002 the Isuzu Faster was built and sold in New Zealand as the Holden Rodeo. While the Trentham plant existed, New Zealand models were made with specifications that differed to Australian models. When the replacement Isuzu D-Max was launched in 2002, both countries marketed it as the third-generation Holden Rodeo from 2003 until 2008 when Isuzu split from GM. A facelifted model, no longer an Isuzu product and in its second generation, was after that sold as the Holden Colorado in both New Zealand and Australia, built at the GM plant in Thailand.

In 2010 Isuzu Utes New Zealand Limited was formed to sell passenger vehicles under the Isuzu brand.

The Isuzu-derived Colorado went on sale in June 2012 in both Australia and New Zealand, replacing the Isuzu-derived Holden Rodeo. The Colorado was sourced from GM's factory in Rayong Thailand. It was badged as a Holden in both countries and was available alongside the similar Isuzu D-Max. (The second-generation Colorado changed to the Brazilian-built Chevrolet S-10 pickup in 2017.)

After the Holden marque was ended by General Motors in 2020 and Holden New Zealand reverted to its pre-1994 name: General Motors New Zealand, Isuzu Utes became one the three business units under the present company and continues to bring in the D-Max pickup and the MU-X SUV into New Zealand.

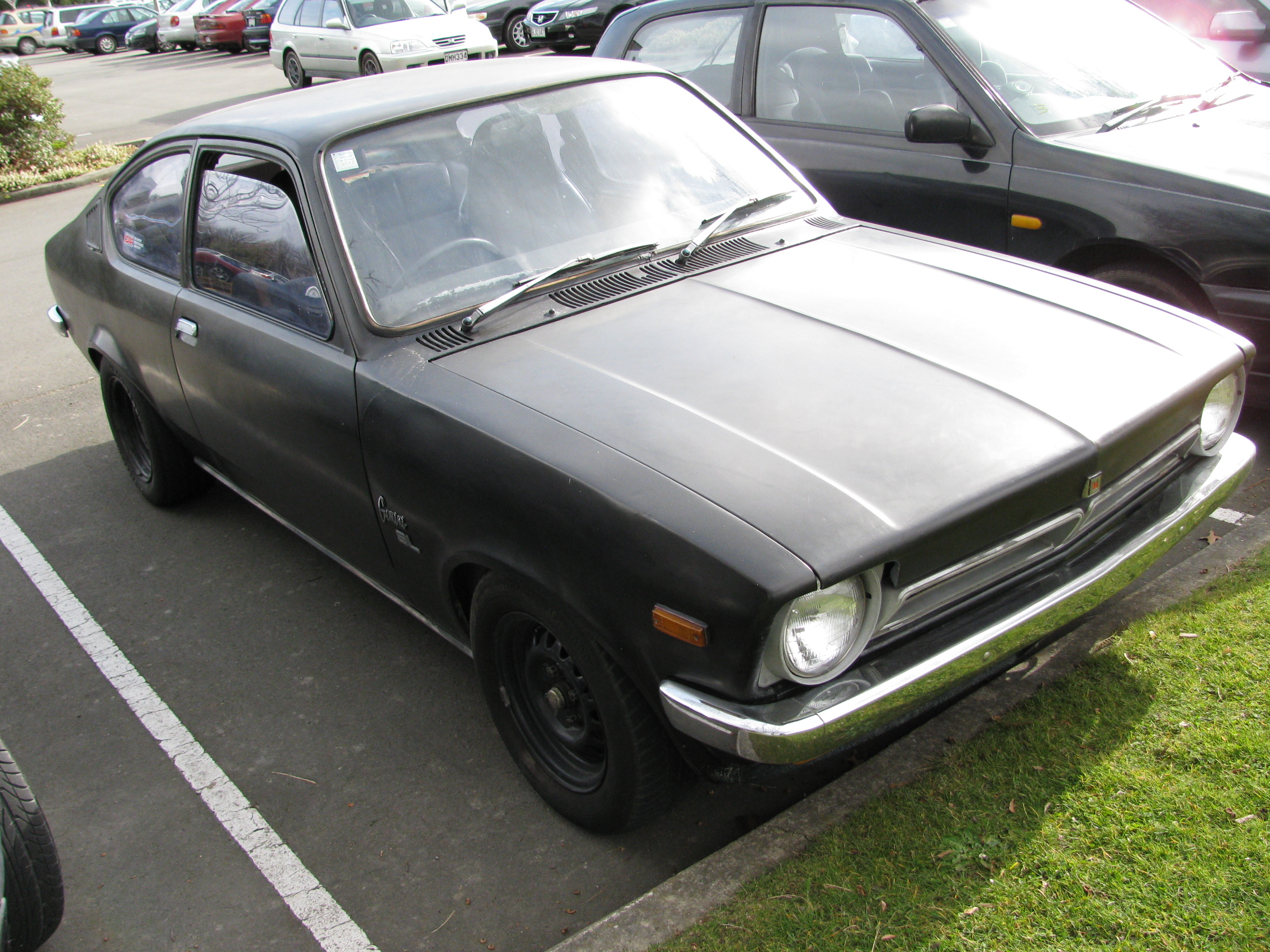
New Zealand-assembled 1978 Isuzu Gemini, eventually badged as "Holden" on latter models

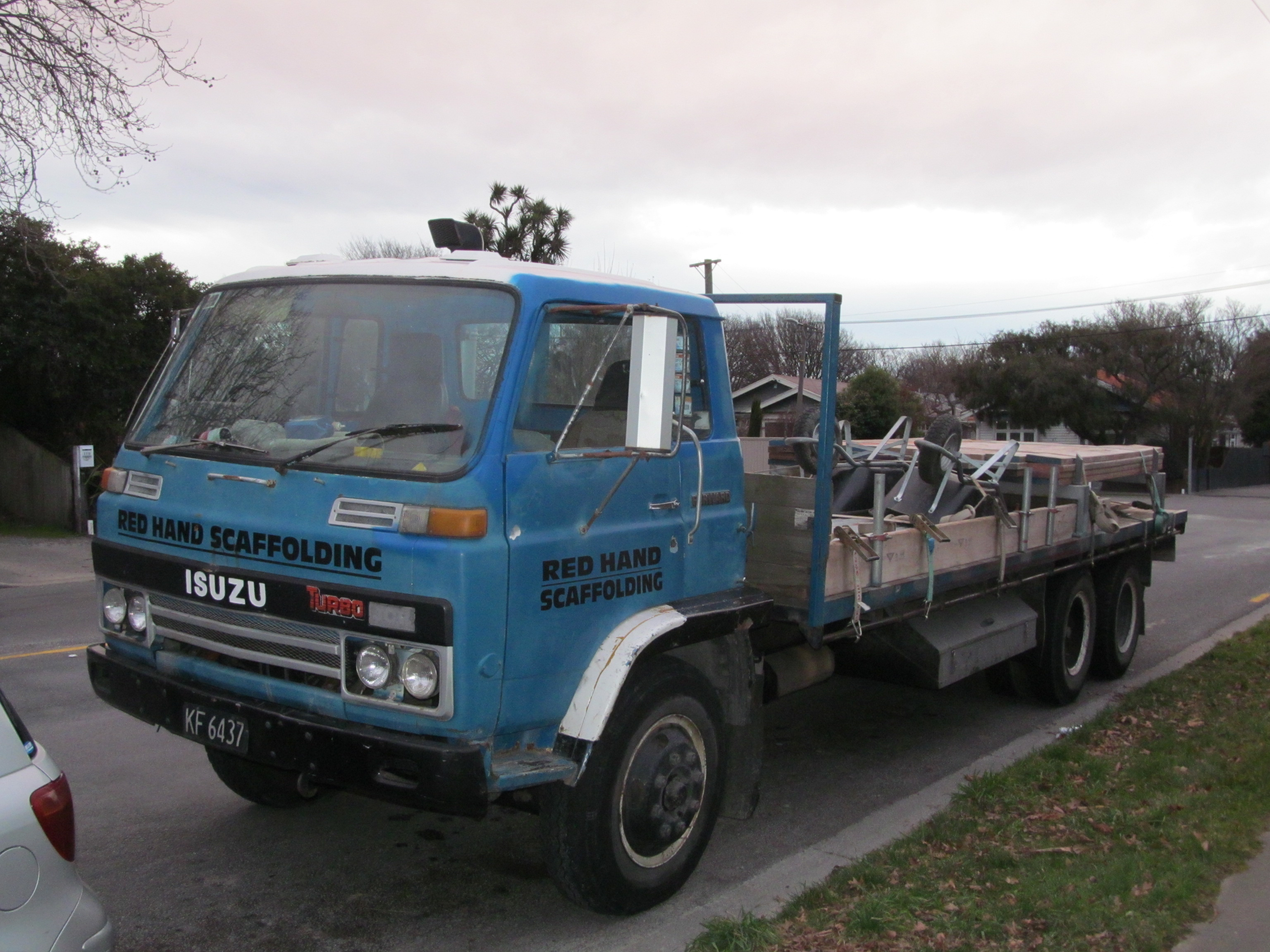
1982 Isuzu Forward (New Zealand)

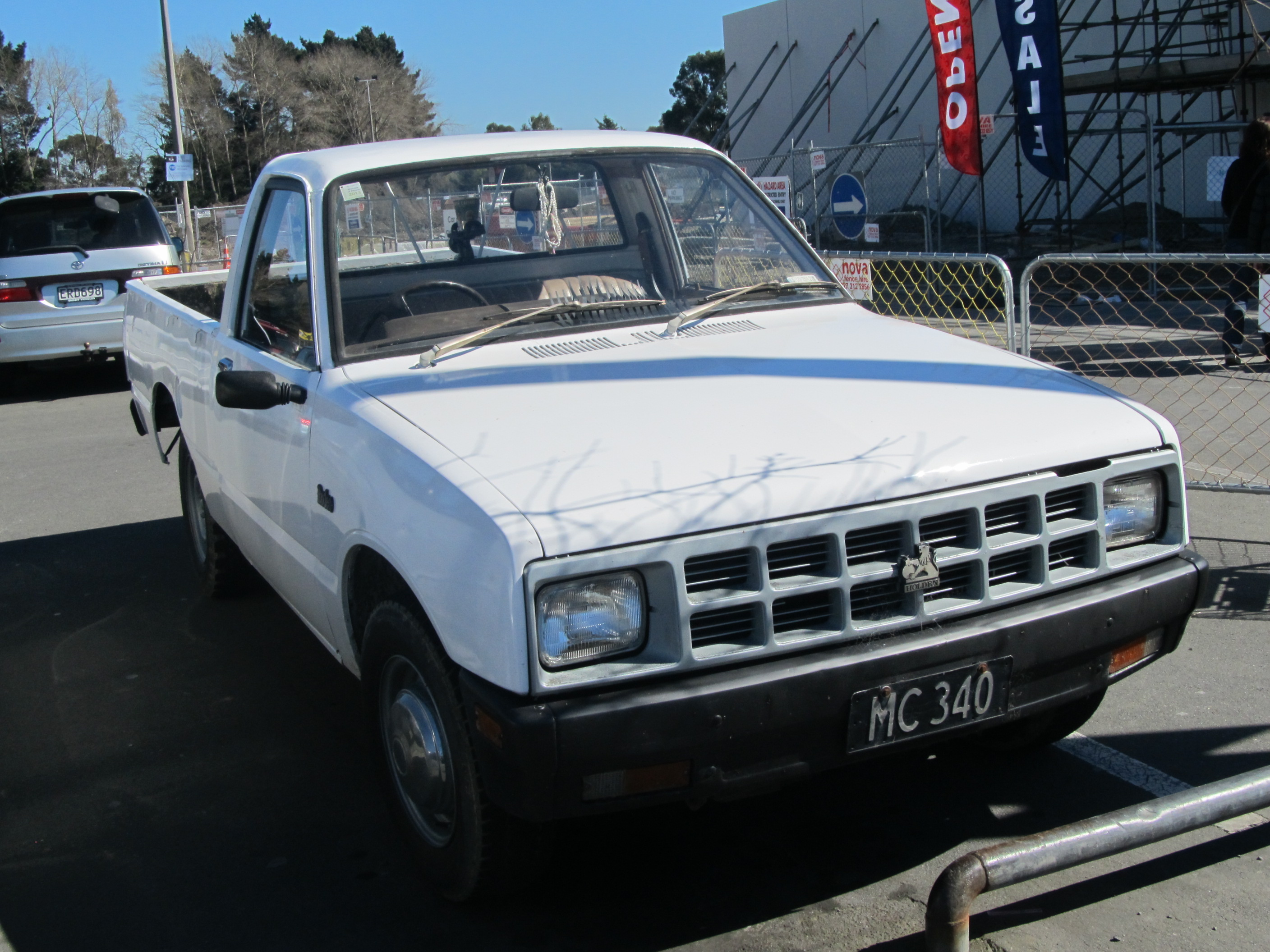
1985 Isuzu Faster/Holden Rodeo (New Zealand)

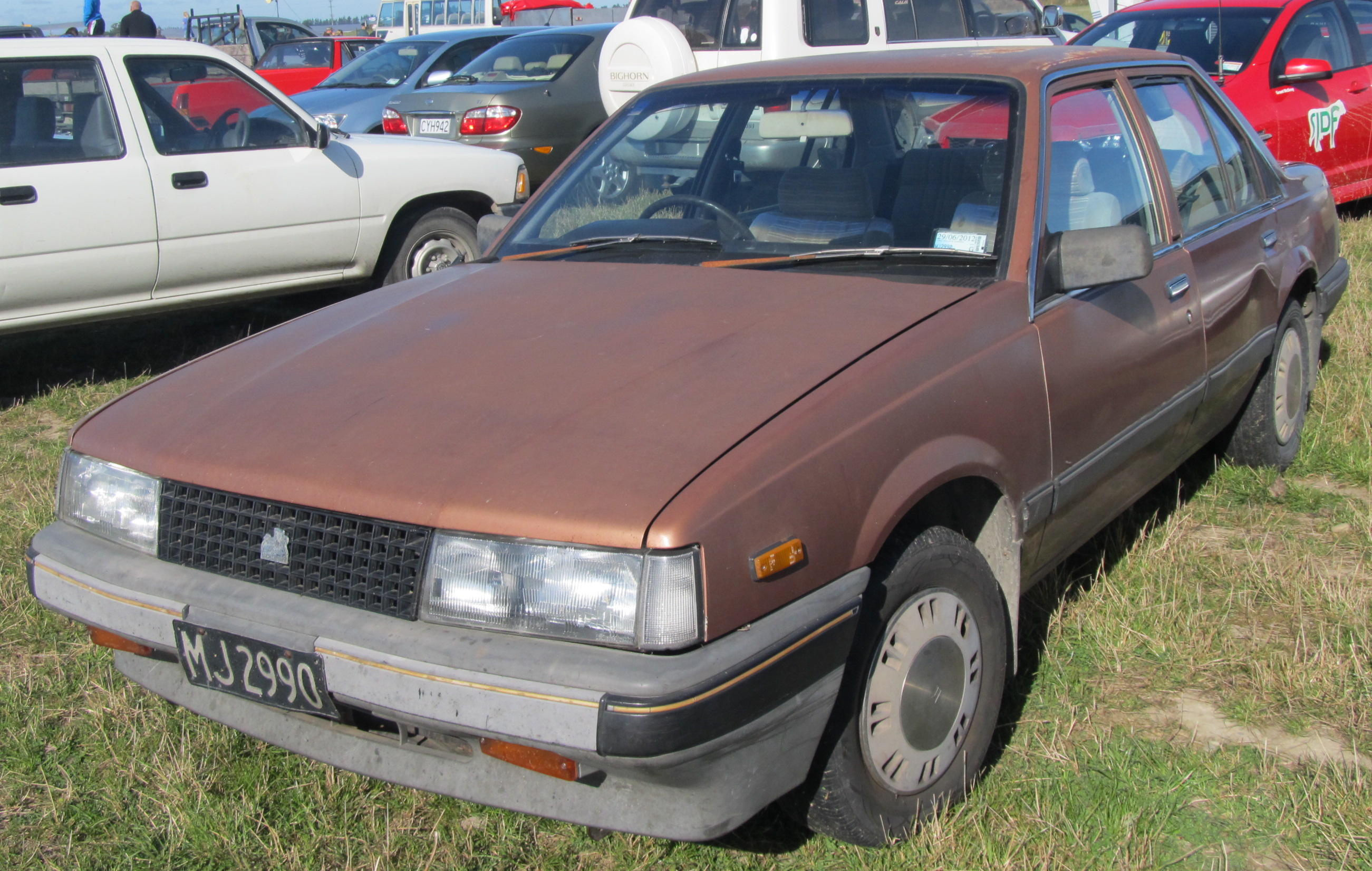
1985 JJ Holden Camira. In reality, a rebadged second-generation Isuzu JJ (New Zealand)

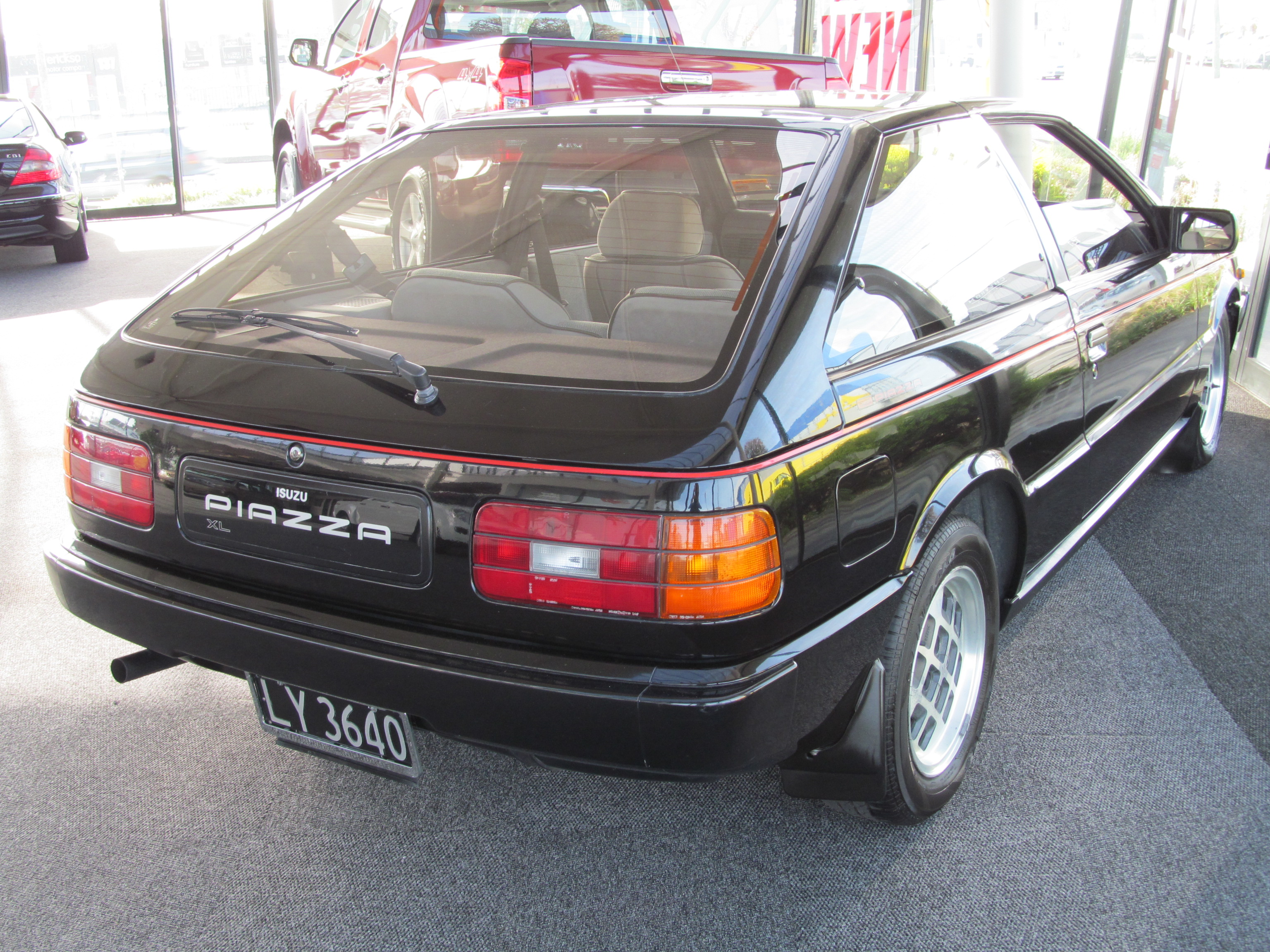
New Zealand 1985 Isuzu Piazza, sold in Australia as "Holden" Piazza

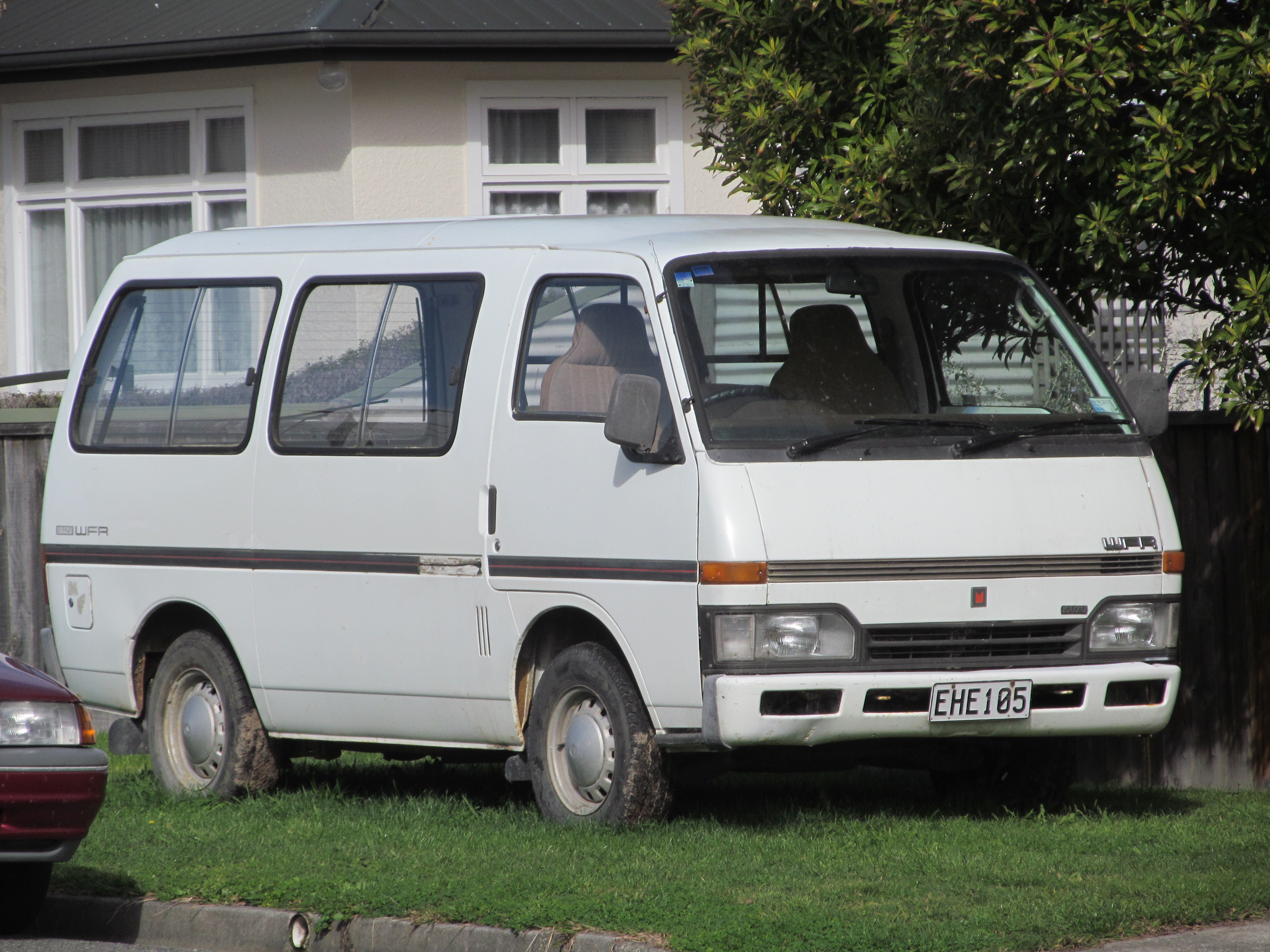
1989 New Zealand-new Isuzu WFR van. In Australia these were sold as the "Holden Shuttle"

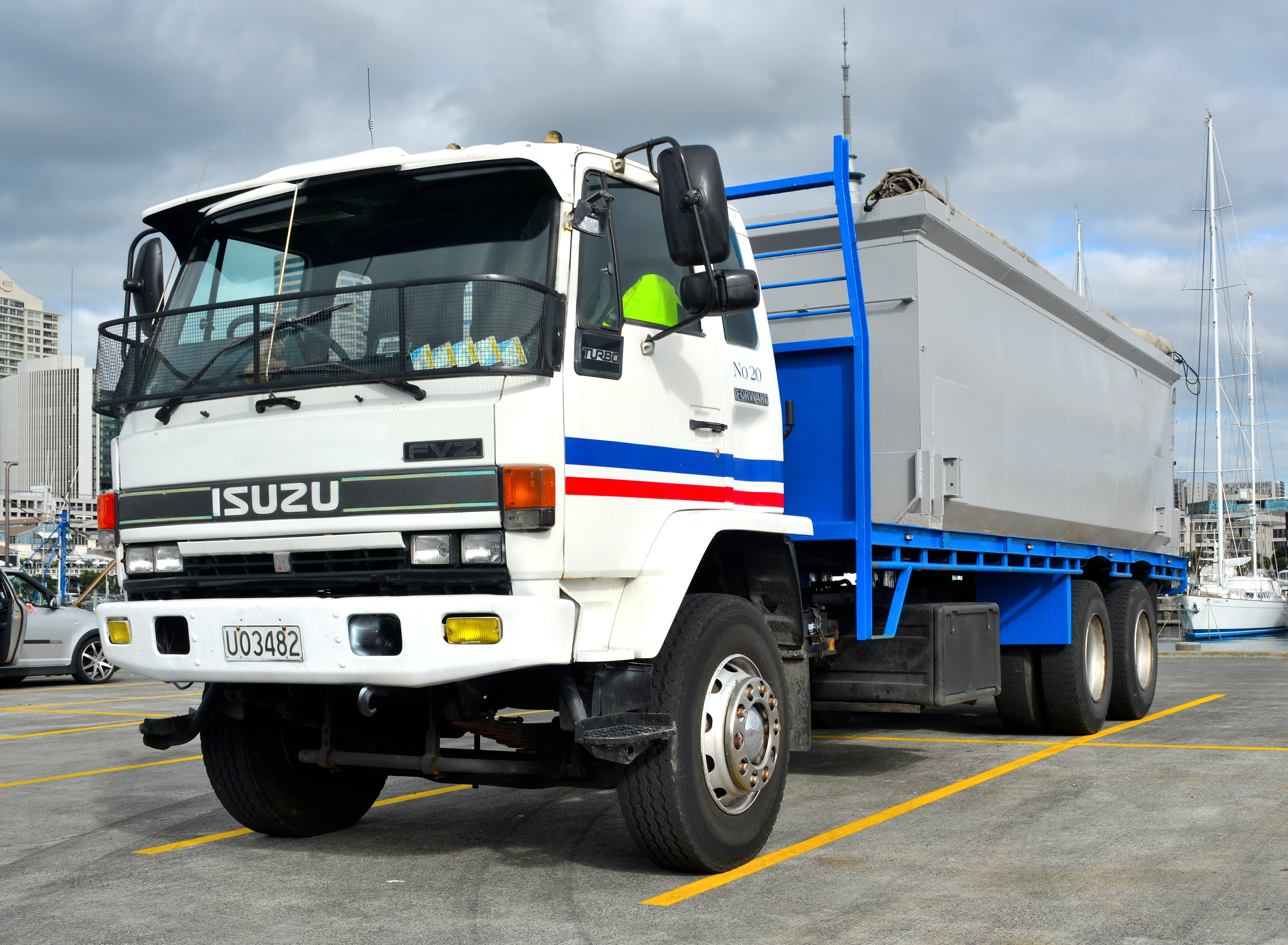
1996 Isuzu F Series FVZ 1400 (New Zealand)

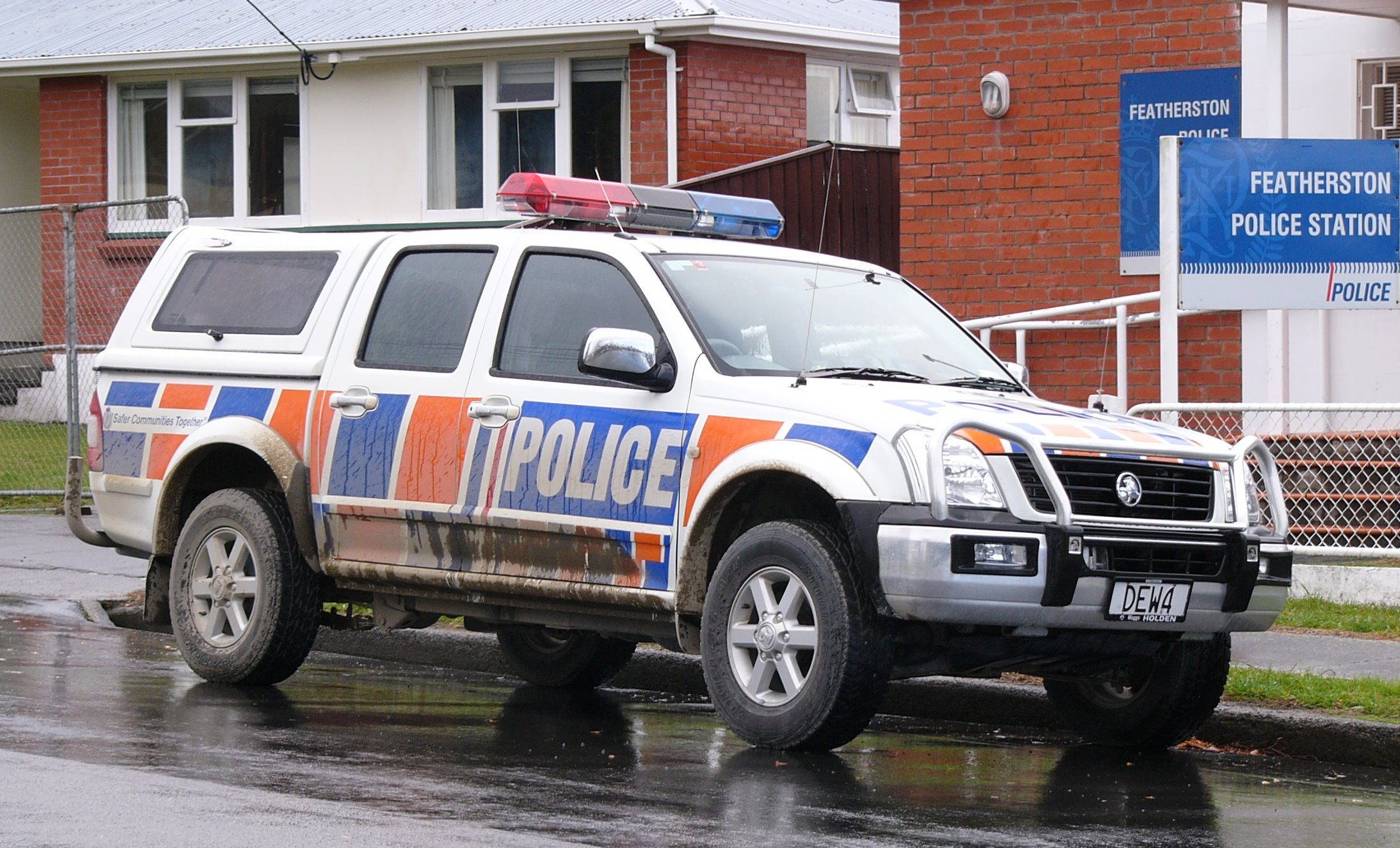
2002 Holden Rodeo (Isuzu Faster) Police vehicle

== Name changes ==
In 1994 General Motors New Zealand changed its name to Holden New Zealand. This change was reversed in 2020, following the wind-down of the Holden brand. As of 2023, GM New Zealand has three business units: one dedicated to the ongoing servicing of the estimated 250,000 Holden vehicles still on the road, Isuzu Utes, and GMSV New Zealand.

== Historical differences between Holden Australia and GMNZ/Holden New Zealand ==
There have been differences between General Motors operations and vehicle models in Australia and New Zealand.

- The first-generation, lower-trim Chevrolet Biscayne was sold in Australia whereas in New Zealand only the higher-spec Chevrolet Bel Air was sold.
- The Pontiac Parisienne and Laurentian were both assembled until 1968 in New Zealand, whereas the Laurentian name tag ceased in Australia after 1963.
- Australia locally built the Vauxhall Cresta until 1965. New Zealand fully imported the Cresta until 1966 after which the Cresta was locally assembled until 1971.
- Holden Australia ceased building Vauxhalls after 1967 after developing the British Vauxhall Viva into Australia's own Holden Torana. The British Vauxhall Viva and Australian Holden Torana were both assembled in New Zealand during the 1970s.
- An Australian-built HQ-series Holden variant with a 350-cubic-inch V8 was sold in New Zealand as the "Chevrolet 350" from 1971 to 1974. In reality it was the Australian Statesman with a larger engine and "Chevrolet" badges.
- New Zealand sold the Isuzu Gemini T-Car during the late 1970s whereas Australia developed their own T-Car model, marketed as the Holden Gemini.
- The Vauxhall Chevette was available in New Zealand between 1976 and 1981. This model was not available in Australia, where the Holden Gemini was sold. The Holden Gemini replaced the Vauxhall Chevette in New Zealand in 1981.
- Various Opels were sold in New Zealand during the 1980s and early 1990s when Australia was otherwise rebadging Toyota and Nissan vehicles as "Holden".
- The sixth-generation Pontiac LeMans sold in New Zealand, United States, and Canada during the 1980s and 1990s was never sold in Australia until its final year of production and was sold in Australia not as Pontiac, but as the "Daewoo 1.5i".
- The first-generation JJ Isuzu Aska was sold in New Zealand between 1984 and 1987 as the "Holden Camira." This replaced the infamous Australian-built JB Camira whereas the Australian replacement was the locally-built, facelifted and upgraded JD Camira.
- Isuzu passenger vehicles sold by GMNZ in New Zealand were sold as Isuzus whereas the same models were sold as "Holden" in Australia.
- The first two generations of Holden Astra (1984–1989) in Australia were both badge-engineered Nissan Pulsars. New Zealand's first Astra was the 1995–1998 Opel Astra F. Australia did not see this model until 1996, a year after New Zealand, and also did not get the station wagon.
- While the wagon version of the Astra H (designated "AH" for Australasia) went on sale in Australia in August 2005, it was not available in New Zealand until June 2008.
- The Tigra was released in Australia but not sold in New Zealand.
- New Zealand had unique variants of Australian Holden Commodores even after New Zealand assembly ceased in 1990. Thereafter New Zealand-only Commodores continued to be built in Australia and exported to New Zealand. The New Zealand-only models were called Commodore Royale in New Zealand.
- Due to the large number of second-hand Japanese imports into New Zealand, such vehicles sold in Australia only as "Holden" can also be seen on New Zealand roads as their international equivalents such as the Chevrolet Optra which was the Holden Viva in both Australia and New Zealand, the Opel/Holden Astra, the 2002–2006 Suzuki Ignis-derived Chevrolet Cruze, the Japanese-market Chevrolet Sonic (Holden Barina), and the Japanese-market Chevrolet Malibu sold as the Holden Malibu in Australia.
- The Mexican-built Equinox was stopped in Australia in 2018 but continued to be sold in New Zealand until 2020.

== Final lineup ==
By 2019, the range of vehicles sold in Australia and New Zealand had been largely unified, with only the Spark and Equinox still sold in New Zealand after being discontinued in Australia. The last models offered by Holden New Zealand before its sell-out of last remaining stock in 2020 were:

- Acadia
- Astra Hatch
- Astra Sportwagon
- Commodore
- Commodore Sportwagon
- Commodore Tourer
- Colorado
- Trax
- Spark
- Equinox
- Trailblazer
