= FBT =

FBT may refer to:

- Farm Business Tenancy, a form of tenancy in England and Wales made under the Agricultural Tenancies Act 1995
- FBT (company), a Thai sports apparel brand
- First Bank and Trust, US
- Flyback transformer
- Fringe benefits tax
  - Fringe benefits tax (Australia)
  - Fringe benefits tax (New Zealand)
  - Fringe benefits tax (India)
- Folate-biopterin transporter family
- Frost Bank Tower, Austin, Texas, US
- FBT (musical instruments), Italian manufacturer of audio equipment
- Greg Mueller (born 1971), Canadian poker player, nicknamed FBT
