= Fringe benefits tax =

Taxation of non-cash employee benefits

A fringe benefits tax (FBT) is taxation of most, but not all fringe benefits, which are generally non-cash employee benefits. The rationale behind FBT is that it helps restore equity and fairness to those employees who do not receive such benefits, and allows a Federal Government to more fairly assess taxpayer entitlement to government benefits, or liability to government taxes or levies.

This kind of taxation is done in a number of countries and the applicable laws vary. See the corresponding articles for details.

- Fringe benefits tax (Australia)
- Fringe benefits tax (New Zealand)
- Fringe benefits tax (India)
