= 1977 Australian Touring Car Championship =

Motor racing competition

Seasons
- ← 1976 1978 →

The 1977 Australian Touring Car Championship was a CAMS sanctioned Australian motor racing championship open to Group C Touring Cars. It was the 18th running of the Australian Touring Car Championship. The championship began at Symmons Plains Raceway on 7 March and ended at the Phillip Island Grand Prix Circuit on 20 November after eleven rounds. 1977 was the second and final time that the series incorporated the longer distance races which made up the Australian Championship of Makes. These races included the Sandown 400 and the Phillip Island 500K, although notably not the Bathurst 1000.

Reigning champion Allan Moffat (Ford Falcon) dominated the 1977 season. In addition to his victory in the non-championship Hardie-Ferodo 1000 at Bathurst, Moffat won his third Australian Touring Car Championship, leading home new Moffat Ford Dealers teammate Colin Bond for a series 1-2 result. Moffat won the first five rounds of the championship, won a total of seven out of the eleven rounds and won the title by 32 points. Bond recorded a win at Adelaide International Raceway but was put under pressure near the end of the season from Peter Brock after consecutive wins by the Holden Torana driver at Lakeside International Raceway and Sandown Raceway in the Hang Ten 400. In the end Bond finished nine points clear of Brock. The only other round win was claimed by Allan Grice (Holden Torana) at the final round at the Phillip Island Grand Prix Circuit.

In previous years the class pointscore system saw a consistent performer threaten the top of the points table. In 1977 though the best performer from the smaller cars was Ford Capri racer Lawrie Nelson who finished fourth in the points, 19 behind Brock. Holden Torana racer Bob Morris took points away from the small car class drivers by racing his Triumph Dolomite early in the series, as well as racing Lakis Manticas' Ford Capri on occasion, effectively spoiling the chances of other drivers in the under three-litre class.

== Drivers ==
Drivers that competed in the 1977 Australian Touring Car Championship included the following:

Entrant	No	Car	Driver
Moffat Ford Dealers	1	Ford XB Falcon GT Hardtop	Allan Moffat
Moffat Ford Dealers	1	Ford XC Falcon GS500 Hardtop	Allan Moffat
Moffat Ford Dealers	2	Ford XB Falcon GT Hardtop	Colin Bond
Moffat Ford Dealers	2	Ford XC Falcon GS500 Hardtop	Colin Bond
Marlboro Holden Dealer Team	3	Holden LH Torana SLR5000 L34	John Harvey
Bob Jane T-Marts	3	Holden LX Torana A9X SS Hatchback	Bob Jane
Gown-Hindhaugh	4	Holden LH Torana SLR5000 L34	Bruce Hindhaugh
Bill Patterson	05	Holden LX Torana A9X SS Hatchback	Peter Brock
Craven Mild	6	Holden LH Torana SLR5000 L34	Allan Grice
Craven Mild	6	Holden LX Torana A9X SS Hatchback	Allan Grice
Channel 7	7	Holden LH Torana SLR5000 L34	Bob Morris
Channel 7	7	Holden LX Torana A9X SLR5000	Bob Morris
Marlboro Holden Dealer Team	8	Holden LH Torana SLR5000 L34	Charlie O'Brien
Marlboro Holden Dealer Team	8	Holden LX Torana A9X SLR5000	Wayne Negus
Peter Janson	9	Holden LH Torana SLR5000 L34	Larry Perkins
Mercury Outboards	9	Holden LX Torana A9X SS Hatchback	Charlie O'Brien
Sidchrome/Melford	10	Ford XB Falcon GT Hardtop	Jim Richards
Bob Forbes	11	Holden LH Torana SLR5000 L34	Bob Forbes
Pioneer Electronics	12	Ford XB Falcon GT Hardtop	Ron Dickson
Marlboro Holden Dealer Team	14	Holden LX Torana A9X SS Hatchback	John Harvey
Kevin Bartlett	14	Ford XB Falcon GT Hardtop	Kevin Bartlett
Ipec	15	Holden LH Torana SLR5000 L34	Peter Janson
Bryan Byrt Ford	17	Ford XB Falcon GT Hardtop	Dick Johnson
Brian Wood Ford	18	Ford XB Falcon GT Hardtop	Murray Carter
Phillip Industries	19	Holden LH Torana SLR5000 L34	Ian Diffen
Gown-Hindhaugh	20	Holden LH Torana SLR5000 L34	Garth Wigston
Gown-Hindhaugh	20	Holden LX Torana A9X SLR5000	Garth Wigston
Maurice Andrews	21	Holden Torana	Maurice Andrews
Citizen Quartz	21	Ford XC Falcon GS500 Hardtop	John Goss
Pioneer Electronics	22	Holden LH Torana SLR5000 L34	Warren Cullen
John Goss	22	Ford XB Falcon GT Hardtop	John Goss
Pioneer Electronics	22	Holden LX Torana A9X SS Hatchback	Warren Cullen
Pioneer Electronics	23	Holden LH Torana SLR5000 L34	Warren Cullen
Rusty French	23	Ford XC Falcon GS500 Hardtop	Rusty French
Bill Patterson	24	Holden LH Torana SLR5000 L34	Basil Van Rooyen
Bill Patterson	25	Holden LH Torana SLR5000 L34	Peter Brock
Bill Patterson	25	Holden LX Torana A9X SS Hatchback	Peter Brock
Bill Patterson	26	Holden LH Torana SLR5000 L34	Phil Brock
Craven Mild	26	Holden LX Torana A9X SS Hatchback	Allan Grice
Kevin Kennedy	27	Holden LJ Torana GTR XU-1	Kevin Kennedy
HM Headers	28	Ford XB Falcon GT Hardtop	Jim Keogh
Rod Donovan	28	Ford XB Falcon GT Hardtop	Rod Donovan
Phillip Arnull	29	Holden LH Torana SLR5000 L34	Phillip Arnull
Graham Ryan	29	Holden LH Torana SLR5000 L34	Graham Ryan
Garry Willmington	30	Ford XB Falcon GT Hardtop	Garry Willmington
Lawrie Nelson	32	Ford Capri V6	Lawrie Nelson
Lynn Brown	32	Mazda RX-3	Lynn Brown
Russell Skaife	34	Ford Capri V6	Russell Skaife
Tim Slako	34	Holden LH Torana SLR5000 L34	Tim Slako
Barry Seton	35	Ford Capri V6	Barry Seton
Arthur Hardwick	36	Mazda RX-3	Arthur Hardwick
Lakis Manticas	37	Ford Capri V6	Lakis Manticas
Alan Taylor	37	Holden LH Torana SLR5000 L34	Alan Taylor
Phil McDonnell	38	BMW 3.0Si	Phil McDonnell
David Seldon	38	Triumph Dolomite Sprint	David Seldon
Allan Bryant	38	Mazda RX-3	Allan Bryant
ATP Australia	40	Ford Capri V6	Alan Cant
Geoff Leeds	41	Mazda RX-3	Geoff Leeds
Brian Sampson	43	Holden LH Torana SLR5000 L34	Brian Sampson
Rogar Automotive	43	Mazda RX-3	Nick Louis
Kim Harley	44	Holden LJ Torana GTR XU-1	Kim Harley
Ben Penhall	44	Mazda RX-3	Ben Penhall
Paul Gulson	44	Alfa Romeo 2000 GTV	Paul Gulson
John Stoopman	44	Holden LJ Torana GTR XU-1	John Stoopman
TB Penhall	45	Mazda RX-3	Ben Penhall
Barry Lawrence	45	Triumph Dolomite Sprint	Barry Lawrence
Brian Wood Ford	46	Ford Capri V6	Ray Farrar
Ross Burbidge	46	Mazda RX-3	Ross Burbidge
Graham Parsons	47	Holden Torana	Graham Parsons
Graeme Wilson	47	Holden LJ Torana GTR XU-1	Graeme Wilson
Terry Shiel	48	Mazda RX-3	Terry Shiel
Ian Messner	49	Ford Escort	Ian Messner
Brian Wood Ford	49	Ford Escort MkII RS2000	Lyndon Arnel
Brian Potts	50	Holden LH Torana SLR5000 L34	Brian Potts
Brian Potts	50	Mazda RX-3	Brian Potts
Jim Hunter	51	Mazda RX-3	Jim Hunter
Warren Torr	51	Mazda RX-3	John Duggan
Vic Wilson	52	Ford Capri V6	Vic Wilson
Ian Messner	52	Ford Escort MkI RS2000	Ian Messner
Lennox Motors	53	Volkswagen Golf GTI	Chris Heyer
Allan Gough	53	Holden Gemini	Allan Gough
Mike Minear	54	Holden Gemini	Mike Minear
Roger Stanley	55	Holden LH Torana SLR5000 L34	Roger Stanley
Peter Stoopman	55	Holden LJ Torana GTR XU-1	Peter Stoopman
Gordon Rich	57	Alfa Romeo 2000 GTV	Gordon Rich
Ron Gillard	57	Alfa Romeo 2000 GTV	Ron Gillard
Ray Cutchie	58	Ford Escort MkI RS2000	Ray Cutchie
David Cannon	58	Ford Escort MkI RS2000	David Cannon
Douglas Hi-Fi	59	Alfa Romeo Alfetta GTAm	Frank Porter
Ray Gulson	61	Alfa Romeo 2000 GTV	Ray Gulson
Geoff Wade	61	Triumph Dolomite Sprint	Geoff Wade
Gil Gordon Alfa Geelong	62	Alfa Romeo Alfetta GT	Warwick Henderson
Wayne Mitchell	63	Holden LH Torana SLR5000 L34	Wayne Mitchell
Alfa Romeo Club	63	Alfa Romeo GT1300 Junior	Robin Dudfield
Peter Kuebler	63	Alfa Romeo 2000 GTV	Peter Kuebler
Martin Power	64	Holden LJ Torana GTR XU-1	Martin Power
Ian Chilman	64	Honda Civic	Ian Chilman
Jim Liang-Peach	65	Triumph Dolomite Sprint	Jim Liang-Peach
David Clement	66	Mazda RX-3	David Clement
John White	66	Ford Escort MkI RS2000	John White
Ross Bond	66	Holden Torana	Ross Bond
Peter Granger	67	BMW 2002	Peter Granger
Brian Wood Ford	69	Ford Escort RS2000	Rod Stevens
Ralph Radburn	69	Triumph Dolomite Sprint	Ralph Radburn
Ferris Car Radios	70	Holden LH Torana SLR5000 L34	Barry Allen
Peter Williamson Toyota	70	Toyota Celica	Peter Williamson
Alan Welling	71	Holden LJ Torana GTR XU-1	Alan Welling
Brian Wood Ford	71	Ford Escort MkI RS2000	Rod Stevens
Alf Grant	71	Alfa Romeo 2000 GTV	Alf Grant
Roger Stanley	72	Holden Torana	Roger Stanley
Neville Bridges	73	Holden LJ Torana GTR XU-1	Neville Bridges
Bernie Stack	74	Volkswagen Passat 1300	Bernie Stack
Stephen Land	74	Datsun 1200	Stephen Land
Hair Affair	75	Morris Clubman GT	Jim Stewart
Ray Molloy	76	Morris Clubman GT	Ray Molloy
Ron Hodgson	77	Triumph Dolomite Sprint	Bob Morris
Bob Morris	77	Ford Capri V6	Bob Morris
Barry Sheales Holden	77	Holden Gemini	Allan Gough
Geoff Newton	78	Ford Capri V6	Geoff Newton
Hugh Donaldson	78	Fiat 124	Hugh Donaldson
Darryl Wilcox	79	Holden LJ Torana GTR XU-1	Darryl Wilcox
Ian Wells	79	Ford Escort MkI RS2000	Ian Well
Wynn's Friction Proofing	79	Ford Capri V6	John Faulkner
John Millyard	80	Ford Capri V6	John Millyard
Ian Lees	80	Ford Capri V6	Ian Lees
Graeme Blanchard Holden	81	Holden LH Torana SLR5000 L34	Graeme Blanchard
Tony Niovanni	82	Holden Gemini	Tony Niovanni
Graeme Wilson	84	Holden LJ Torana GTR XU-1	Graeme Wilson
Graeme Wilson	84	Holden LH Torana SLR5000 L34	Graeme Wilson
Stuart Saker	85	Ford Escort	Stuart Saker
Pat Hogan	86	Ford Escort MkI RS2000	Pat Hogan
Graham Mein	87	Ford Escort MkI RS2000	Graham Mein
David Seldon	88	Triumph Dolomite Sprint	David Seldon
Bob Holden/Shell Sport	88	Ford Escort RS2000	Greg Toepfer
Kerry Cox	89	Holden LJ Torana GTR XU-1	Kerry Cox
Peter Lander	89	Morris Clubman GT	Peter Lander
Wayne Sweetland	90	Holden Torana	Wayne Sweetland
Graham Harrison	91	Alfa Romeo 2000 GTV	Graham Harrison
Ken Harrison	91	Ford Escort	Ken Harrison
Gary Whittaker	92	Toyota Corolla	Gary Whittaker
Robyn Hamilton	93	Holden Gemini	Robyn Hamilton
Gary Leggatt	94	Fiat 128 3P	Gary Leggatt
Deane Hill	95	Holden Gemini	Deane Hill
Ray Kaleda	97	Holden Torana	Ray Kaleda
Greville Arnel	97	Ford Escort	Greville Arnel
Martin Power	97	Holden LJ Torana GTR XU-1	Martin Power
David Langman	98	Holden LH Torana SLR5000 L34	David Langman
Graeme Adams	99	Ford Capri V6	Graeme Adams
Louis Stoopman Jr	99	BMW 2002tii	Louis Stoopman J
Russell Worthington	100	Mazda RX-3	Russell Worthington
Jeff Ogg	101	Mazda RX-3	Jeff Ogg
Geoff Moran	102	Ford Capri V6	Geoff Moran
Eric Olsen	103	Mazda RX-3	Eric Olsen
Barry Jones	108	Mazda RX-3	Barry Jones
Mollison Motors	109	Honda Civic	Matthew Phillip
Max Patterson	111	Honda Civic	Max Patterson
John Nelson	114	Datsun 1600	John Nelson
Annette Williams	118	Holden LJ Torana GTR XU-1	Annette Williams

Three litre class competitors

== Calendar ==
The 1977 Australian Touring Car Championship was contested over eleven rounds.

Rd.	Race / circuit	City / state	Date	Format	Winner	Car	Team	Report
1	Symmons Plains; Symmons Plains Raceway	Launceston; Tasmania	7 March	Two heats	Allan Moffat	Ford XB Falcon GT Hardtop	Moffat Ford Dealers	
2	Calder; Calder Park Raceway	Melbourne; Victoria	20 March	One race	Allan Moffat	Ford XB Falcon GT Hardtop	Moffat Ford Dealers	
3	Oran Park; Oran Park Raceway	Sydney; New South Wales	27 March	One race	Allan Moffat	Ford XB Falcon GT Hardtop	Moffat Ford Dealers	
4	Amaroo Park; Amaroo Park	Sydney; New South Wales	10 April	One race	Allan Moffat	Ford XB Falcon GT Hardtop	Moffat Ford Dealers	
5	Sandown; Sandown International Raceway	Melbourne; Victoria	17 April	One race	Allan Moffat	Ford XB Falcon GT Hardtop	Moffat Ford Dealers	
6	Silver Jubilee Trophy; Adelaide International Raceway	Adelaide; South Australia	5 June	One race	Colin Bond	Ford XB Falcon GT Hardtop	Moffat Ford Dealers	
7	The Governor's Trophy; Lakeside International Raceway	Brisbane; Queensland	26 June	One race	Peter Brock	Holden LH Torana SL/R 5000 L34	Bill Patterson Racing	
8	Hang Ten 400; Sandown International Raceway	Melbourne; Victoria	11 September	1 x 500 km race	Peter Brock	Holden LX Torana SS A9X	Bill Patterson Racing	report
9	Rothmans 250; Adelaide International Raceway	Adelaide; South Australia	23 October	1 x 250 km race	Allan Moffat	Ford XC Falcon GS500 Hardtop	Moffat Ford Dealers	
10	Rothmans 300; Surfers Paradise International Raceway	Surfers Paradise; Queensland	6 November	1 x 300 km race	Allan Moffat	Ford XC Falcon GS500 Hardtop	Moffat Ford Dealers	
11	Ready Plan Insurance Phillip Island 500K; Phillip Island Grand Prix Circuit	Phillip Island; Victoria	20 November	1 x 500 km race	Allan Grice	Holden LX Torana SS A9X	Craven Mild Racing	report

== Classes ==
For points-scoring purposes, cars competing in the Australian Touring Car Championship were classified into one of two classes defined by engine capacity.

- Up to and including 3000cc
- 3001 to 6000 cc

== Points system ==
Australian Touring Car Championship points were awarded to drivers as follows:

Pos	1st	2nd	3rd	4th	5th	6th
All Rounds Outright	4	3	2	1		
Rounds 1–7 each class	9	6	4	3	2	1
Rounds 8–11 each class	12	8	6	4	2	1

Only the best six scores from the first seven rounds and the best two scores from the last four rounds counted towards the championship totals.

Points were awarded only where a car completed 75% of race distance and was running at the completion of the final lap.

== Results ==
Results of the 1977 Australian Touring Car Championship were as follows:

Pos.	Driver	Sym	Cal	Ora	Ama	San	Ade	Lak	San	Ade	Sur	Phi	Pts
1	Allan Moffat	1st(13)	1st(13)	1st(13)	1st(13)	1st(13)	2nd(9)	Ret	3rd((8))	1st(16)	1st(16)		106(114)
2	Colin Bond	2nd(9)	2nd(9)	8th	2nd(9)	2nd(9)	1st(13)	2nd(9)	5th(5)	2nd(11)	Ret	5th((2))	74(76)
3	Peter Brock	3rd(6)	3rd(6)	3rd(6)	7th	4th(4)	3rd(6)	1st(13)	1st(16)	9th	3rd(8)	Ret	65
4	Lawrie Nelson	(9)	(4)			(9)	10th(6)		6th(12)			(6)	46
5	Bob Morris	(6)	Ret	(9)	10th(9)	Ret		(9)	Ret		2nd(11)		44
6	John Harvey	8th	4th(4)	2nd(9)	Ret	3rd(6)	5th(2)	3rd(6)	Ret	3rd(8)		4th(5)	40
7	Allan Grice	Ret	Ret	5th(2)	3rd(6)		4th(4)		2nd(11)			1st(16)	39
8	Rod Stevens		10th(9)			(6)			Ret	10th(12)			27
9	Ray Gulson	(4)									(6)	10th(8)	18
9	Frank Porter								9th(6)			9th(12)	18
11	Peter Janson		Ret	10th					Ret	5th(2)		2nd(11)	13
12	Barry Seton										7th(12)		12
13	Jim Richards			Ret					Ret	6th(1)	5th(2)	3rd(8)	11
13	Nick Louis						9th(9)		Ret	(2)			11
15	Murray Carter	4th(4)		6th(1)	8th	8th	6th(1)	4th(4)	Ret	7th	10th		10
15	Charlie O'Brien	6th(1)	5th(2)	4th(4)	5th(2)	6th(1)			Ret			8th	10
15	Ray Farrar								18th	(6)		(4)	10
15	Russell Worthington							8th(6)			(4)		10
19	Lyndon Arnel								Ret		(8)		8
19	Paul Gulson									(8)			8
19	John Duggan								7th(8)				8
22	Dick Johnson			Ret		5th(2)		Ret	Ret		4th(5)		7
22	Warren Cullen		8th	9th	6th(1)				6th(1)	4th(5)			7
22	Arthur Hardwick			(3)	(4)								7
25	John Millard		(6)										6
25	Alan Cant			(6)									6
25	Russell Skaife				(6)								6
28	John Goss				4th(4)				Ret	8th	6th(1)		5
28	Peter Granger	(3)		(2)									5
28	Roger Cartwright									(4)		(1)	5
31	George Adams			(4)									4
31	Ray Cutchie					(4)			Ret				4
31	Deane Hill						(4)						4
31	Ralph Radburn								10th(4)				4
35	Jim Laing-Peach				(3)				Ret				3
35	David Clement					(3)							3
37	Ian Diffen	5th(2)	7th										2
37	Ron Dickson		9th			9th	7th	5th(2)					2
37	Graeme Blanchard								5th(2)				2
37	Ron Gillard				(2)								2
37	Ben Penhall					(2)			Ret				2
37	Warwick Henderson								(2)				2
37	Peter Hopwood								(2)				2
37	Ross Burbidge										(2)		2
37	John Faulkner											(2)	2
46	Garth Wigston	7th	6th(1)	7th		7th							1
46	Neville Bridges							6th(1)					1
46	Wayne Negus								Ret			6th(1)	1
46	Gordon Rich			(1)									1
46	Chris Heyer					(1)			13th				1
46	Brian Potts	9th							(1)				1
46	Jim Stewart									(1)			1
46	Alf Grant										(1)		1
Pos	Driver	Sym	Cal	Ora	Ama	San	Ade	Lak	San	Ade	Sur	Phi	Pts

Colour	Result
Gold	Winner
Silver	Second place
Bronze	Third place
Green	Points classification
Blue	Non-points classification
Blue	Non-classified finish (NC)
Purple	Retired, not classified (Ret)
Red	Did not qualify (DNQ)
Red	Did not pre-qualify (DNPQ)
Black	Disqualified (DSQ)
White	Did not start (DNS)
White	Withdrew (WD)
White	Race cancelled (C)
Blank	Did not practice (DNP)
Blank	Did not arrive (DNA)
Blank	Excluded (EX)

Three litre class competitors

Note: South African driver Basil van Rooyen placed fourth at Round 8 (the Hang Ten 400 at Sandown) but was not eligible to score points.

== Australian Championship of Makes ==
The 1977 Australian Championship of Makes was awarded on the results of the final four rounds of the 1977 Australian Touring Car Championship. It was the seventh circuit racing championship for manufacturers to be awarded by CAMS and the second to carry the Australian Championship of Makes name.

=== Classes ===
For pointscoring purposes, cars competed in four classes defined by engine capacity

- Class A: Up to 1300cc
- Class B: 1301 to 2000cc
- Class C: 2001 to 3000cc
- Class D: 3001 to 6000cc

=== Points ===
Points were awarded for the six best placed cars in class in each of the four rounds on a 9-6-4-3-2-1 basis with only the highest scoring car of each make attracting points.

=== Results ===
Pos.	Make	Points
1	Ford Capri	36
2	Holden Torana	28
3	Ford Falcon	26
=	Ford Escort	26
5	Honda Civic	24
=	Alfa Romeo GTV	24
7	Morris Mini Clubman	19
8	Mazda RX-3	18
9	Triumph Dolomite Sprint	9
=	Volkswagen Golf	9
=	Fiat 128	9
=	Datsun 1200	9
=	Alfa Romeo Alfetta GTAm	9
14	Alfa Romeo GT1300	4
15	Holden Gemini	2
