= Salary packaging =

Australian term for manipulation of employee benefits

Salary packaging (also known as salary sacrifice or salary exchange) is the inclusion of employee benefits (also called fringe benefits) in an employee remuneration package in exchange for giving up part of monetary salary. Such arrangements are entered into most commonly if there are tax or other benefits to be derived by the employer or employee from the arrangement.

== Salary sacrifice in the United Kingdom ==
In the United Kingdom, HM Revenue and Customs (HMRC) describes salary sacrifice as an arrangement where an employee gives up the right to part of their contractual cash pay in return for a non-cash benefit provided by the employer, achieved by varying the employment contract. HMRC guidance states that if the contract is not effectively varied, or if an employee can readily revert to the previous higher cash salary, the arrangement may be treated as ordinary cash remuneration for tax purposes rather than a genuine sacrifice.

Salary sacrifice arrangements have commonly been used for benefits such as employer pension contributions, employer-supported childcare and cycle-to-work schemes. GOV.UK guidance for employers states that a salary sacrifice arrangement must not reduce an employee's cash earnings below the relevant National Minimum Wage rate.

From 6 April 2017, most benefits provided through salary sacrifice and other optional remuneration arrangements are taxed on the higher of the amount of cash pay given up and the benefit's value under the normal benefit in kind rules, which largely withdraws the income tax and National Insurance contributions advantages for affected benefits.

HMRC guidance notes limited exclusions, including employer payments into registered pension schemes, qualifying childcare vouchers and some other employer-supported childcare, bicycles and cyclist safety equipment, and company cars with CO2 emissions of 75 g/km or less. Childcare voucher and directly contracted employer childcare schemes are closed to new applicants, with continuing entitlement depending on when an employee joined the scheme and whether they remain eligible.

GOV.UK guidance notes that reducing cash pay through salary sacrifice can affect statutory payments and some earnings-related and contribution-based benefits, and may reduce entitlement where average earnings fall below relevant thresholds. The Pensions Regulator describes pension salary sacrifice as a contractual agreement where a worker foregoes salary in return for employer pension contributions, and it says that active membership of a pension scheme for automatic enrolment purposes cannot depend on whether a worker agrees to enter into salary sacrifice. Following the November 2025 budget, the government announced that from April 2029 only the first £2,000 a year of employee pension contributions made through salary sacrifice will be exempt from National Insurance contributions, with National Insurance due on amounts above that cap.

== Salary packaging in Australia ==
Contrary to popular belief, provisions in the FBT (Fringe Benefits Tax) act allow for the employees of private companies to utilise.

Items commonly salary packaged include:

- vehicles (either a company car or through a novated lease)
- mobile phones
- laptop computers

Some companies also allow their employees to salary package other items, including household utility bills, although this is complicated and normally requires the assistance of a third-party company who specialise in salary packaging arrangements. Salary packaged benefits in Australia generally attract Fringe Benefits Tax within the Australian taxation system, with a few exceptions - some benefits are Fringe Benefits Tax exempt, including mobile phones and laptop computers if used for work purposes.

Charities and public not for profit hospitals can do this most effectively as they are exempt from fringe benefits tax up to a certain limit per employee (from 1 April 2014 the amounts are $9,010 for Not-for-Profit Public Hospitals and $15,900 for Public Benevolent Institutions). Additional benefits can be packaged above these limits through novated leasing, meals and entertainment or venue hire (holiday accommodation) as well as personal superannuation contributions subject to Concessional Contributions Caps.

The Australian Salary Packaging Industry Association is the professional body for outsourced salary packaging service providers.

The Australian Taxation Office administers Fringe Benefits Tax and the FBT Exemptions that facilitate salary packaging for employees of not-for-profit healthcare organisations and public benevolent institutions.

The long-awaited FBT exemption for electric vehicles passed through the Senate in Dec 2022. This move is part of a broader plan by the Government to increase the adoption rates of EVs in Australia, which are among the lowest in the developed world.

== See also ==
- Fiscal illusion
