= 1977 Ready Plan Insurance Phillip Island 500K =

The 1977 Ready Plan Insurance Phillip Island 500K was a motor race staged at the Phillip Island circuit in Victoria, Australia on 20 November 1977. It was final round of the 1977 Australian Touring Car Championship and of the 1977 Australian Championship of Makes, and as such was open to Group C Touring Cars. The race was won by Allan Grice driving a Holden Torana.

== Class system ==
As the race was a round of the 1977 Australian Championship of Makes, cars competed in four engine displacement classes:

- Class A: Up to 1300cc
- Class B: 1301 to 2000cc
- Class C: 2001 to 3000cc
- Class D: 3001 to 6000cc

== Race results ==
Position	Drivers	No.	Car	Entrant	Class	Class pos.	Laps
1	Allan Grice	26	Holden LX Torana SS 5000 A9X	Craven Mild Racing	D	1	106
2	Peter Janson	15	Holden LX Torana A9X	Ipec	D	2	106
3	Jim Richards		Ford XB Falcon GT	Melford	D	3	105
4	John Harvey	3	Holden LX Torana SS 5000 A9X	Marlboro Holden Dealer Team	D	4	105
5	Colin Bond	2	Ford XC Falcon	Moffat Ford Dealers	D	5	105
6	Wayne Negus	8	Holden LX Torana SL/R 5000 A9X	Marlboro Holden Dealer Team	D	6	103
7	Barry Allen		Holden LH Torana SL/R 5000 L34	Ferris Car Radios	D	7	103
8	Charlie O'Brien	9	Holden LX Torana SS 5000 A9X	Mercury Outboards	D	8	102
9	Frank Porter		Alfa Romeo Alfetta GT	Benincas	B	1	99
10	Paul Gulson		Alfa Romeo GTV	Endrust	B	2	99
11	Lawrie Nelson		Ford Capri V6	Lawrie Nelson	C	1	98
12	Ray Farrar		Ford Capri V6	Brian Wood Ford	C	2	95
13	Garth Wigston		Holden LX Torana A9X		D	9	95
14	John Faulkner		Ford Capri V6	Wynns Frictionproofing	C	3	94
15	Roger Cartwright		Ford Escort RS2000	Roger Cartwright	B	3	93
16	Matt Phillip		Honda Civic	Mollison Motors	A	1	91
17	David Cannon		Ford Escort RS2000	David Cannon	B	4	91
18	Allan Gough		Holden Gemini	Barry Sheales Holden	B	5	91
19	Robin Dudfield		Alfa Romeo 2000 GTV	Alfa Romeo Club	B	6	91
20	Jim Stewart		Morris Mini Clubman	Hair Affair	A	2	90
21	Martin Power		Holden Torana GTR XU-1		D	10	90
22	Mike Minear		Holden Gemini		B	7	89
23	Robyn Hamilton		Holden Gemini		B	8	89
24	Rusty French, Leo Leonard		Ford XC Falcon		D	11	89
25	Ian Chilman		Honda Civic	Ian Chilman	A	3	88
26	Ian Lees		Ford Capri V6	Ian Lees	C	4	80
27	Scotty Taylor		Holden LH Torana SL/R 5000 L34		D	12	79
28	Max Patterson		Honda Civic	Peninsula Honda	A	5	74
DNF	Peter Brock		Holden LX Torana A9X				
DNF	Bob Morris		Holden LX Torana A9X				
DNF	John Goss		Ford XC Falcon				
DNF	Phil Brock	25	Holden LH Torana SL/R 5000 L34				
DNF	Murray Carter		Ford XC Falcon				
DNF	Jim Keogh		Ford XB Falcon GT				
DNF	Graeme Wilson		Holden LH Torana SL/R 5000 L34				
DNF	John Duggan		Mazda RX-3				
DNF	Rod Stevens		Ford Escort RS2000				
DNF	Neville Bridges		Holden Torana GTR XU-1				
DNF	Barry James		Mazda RX-3				
DNF	Warwick Henderson		Alfa Romeo Alfetta GT				
DNF	Peter Klueber		Alfa Romeo				
DNF	Peter Lander		Morris Mini				
DNF	Gary Leggat		Morris Mini				
DNF	Tony Niovanni		Holden Torana GTR XU-1				
DNF	Ray Harrison		Alfa Romeo				
DNF	John Stoopman		Holden Torana GTR XU-1				
DNF	Warren Cullen, John Walker	22	Holden LX Torana SS 5000 A9X				
DNF	Annette Williams		Holden Torana GTR XU-1				

There were 48 starters and 28 classified finishers in the race.
