= Novated lease =

Motor vehicle lease transferred to another party

A novated lease is a motor vehicle lease which has been novated, that is, the obligations in the contract have been transferred from one party to another. In Australia, it refers almost exclusively to the practice of salary packaging a motor vehicle using a novated lease.

A lease is novated with a three-way (tripartite) agreement (Deed of novation) between the lessee, the lessor (usually a finance company), and a third party, under which all parties agree that the third party will take on some or all of the lessee's obligations and rights under the lease (generally this is making the rental payments instead of the lessee, as well as having use of the vehicle).

== Novated leases in Australia ==
Novated leases are almost exclusively used in Australia as part of an arrangement for providing the use of a motor vehicle by an employer to an employee via salary packaging.

In a salary packaging arrangement involving a novated lease, an employee leases a motor vehicle and the lease is novated to their employer, that is, the employer agrees to take on the obligations of making the lease payments and the right to use the vehicle. The employer then provides the use of the vehicle to the employee as a fringe benefit. The employer will also usually pay the other running costs of the vehicle such as fuel, insurance, registration, service and maintenance as part of the arrangement. The employer reduces the salary of the employee by their total cost. This reduction in the employee's salary results in less income tax being payable by the employee, hopefully resulting in a net financial benefit to the employee.

The term "novated lease" is often used to refer the whole salary packaging arrangement. This leads to confusion as the lease is only a component of the arrangement, and the arrangement is not itself a lease. Similarly, the terms "Novated lease company", "Lease company", and "Leasing company", are used to refer to a salary packaging management company who manages a salary packaging arrangement for the employer rather than the finance company who is actually the lessor.

If the employee ceases to be employed by that employer, the novation is cancelled, and all obligations and rights assumed by the employer under the novation agreement revert to the employee. The lease can subsequently be novated to a new employer. Once the term of the lease has expired, all obligations and rights under the deed of novation cease.

=== Salary packaging with novated leases ===
In salary packaging an employer enters an arrangement to provide non-cash benefits to their employees in exchange for an equivalent reduction in salary, in order to reduce income taxes paid by the employee on that salary, while still providing the same net benefit. A novated lease is a way of providing the benefit of the use of a motor vehicle for an employee via salary packaging without the employer having to actually own the vehicle and also allowing the vehicle to move from employer to employer with the employee bearing the responsibility of the transaction.

=== Tax treatment of a salary packaged novated lease ===
In Australia, non cash benefits provided to an employee are regarded as fringe benefits and employers must pay fringe benefits tax (FBT) on the value of these benefits at a rate equivalent to the highest marginal income tax rate.

When salary packaging a motor vehicle via a novated lease, a fringe benefit is created, and the employer may be liable to pay FBT.

Cars are treated in a concessional manner by the fringe benefits legislation and rather than using the actual running costs, the value of the fringe benefit can instead be set at 20% of the original purchase price of the vehicle, less stamp duty, motor vehicle registration and Compulsory Third Party Insurance. This concessional treatment assumes some business use of the provided motor vehicle, but business use is not actually required.

Other vehicles such as commercial vehicles, utilities and motorbikes are not subject to this treatment, but may be exempt from FBT under certain circumstances. In 2022, amendments to the Fringe Benefits Tax Assessment Act 1986 were made to exempt employers from FBT if they provide an eligible Electric vehicle or Plug in Hybrid Electric Vehicle to their employees.

The fringe benefit value may be reduced to two thirds of the original value at the start of the FBT year (1 April) following 4 full years since the purchase of the vehicle by the lessor. As most novated leases are for 5 years or less, this has a limited effect.

In addition, if the employer is registered for goods and services tax (GST) they can claim an input tax credit equal to the amount of GST they have paid as part of the running cost. This reduces their net cost, and in the case of a salary packaging arrangement, a corresponding reduction in the amount of salary forfeited by the employee in the salary packaging arrangement.

Generally, an employer also would expect their employee to reimburse any FBT the employer must pay, so the reduction in employee salary in the salary package becomes equal to the total running costs paid by the employer, less GST credits, plus any FBT costs and administration costs. It is usually beneficial to use the employee contribution method to offset the fringe benefit rather than the employer paying FBT.

=== Employee contribution method (ECM) ===
The method of valuing the fringe benefit for a car or other motor vehicle allows a contribution from the employee toward the running costs to offset the fringe benefit and reduce the FBT liability.

Since the employee is now paying some of the running costs instead of the employer, it reduces the income tax and GST benefits, but because FBT, equivalent to the highest marginal tax rate, is eliminated, the net cost to the employee in the arrangement is reduced. The ECM is only beneficial if the concessional method for valuation of the fringe benefit (at 20% of the purchase price) is used is lower than the actual running cost, otherwise all the cost would be paid directly by the employee for no tax benefits.

An employee contribution can take either the form of direct payment to third party suppliers or it can be paid to the employer. Since the maximum benefit is obtained by making a contribution of exactly the amount of the fringe benefit (eliminating all FBT), usually the latter is used to ensure the exact dollar amount of the fringe benefit is contributed during the year.

In both situations, the GST credits that the employer can claim are reduced: If the employee pays expenses, then the employer has not paid that GST to claim, and if the employee pays the employer directly, then their payment to the employer includes GST which offsets any GST credits claimed on running costs.

Thus, the reduction in employee salary becomes equal to the total running costs paid by the employer, less GST on those costs, less the employee contribution, plus GST on the employee contribution if it was paid to the employer.

The employee contribution method decreases the income tax savings because less of the total running cost is paid by the employer, resulting in less salary reduction. This extra income tax and the loss of GST credits is always smaller or equal to the cost of the FBT being eliminated, even considering the tax saved by the additional reduction in salary due to packaging the FBT, and so the net cost to the employee is reduced when the ECM is used.

The use of the employee contribution method may lead to additional confusion about the net cost to the employee, as in practice, the reduction in salary and the employee contribution both appear on the employee's payslip as "deductions". The salary reduction is often listed as "pre-tax" and the ECM as "post-tax". In fact, the reduction in salary ("pre-tax") cannot be paid to the employee as this would result in it being counted as income and therefore taxable.

=== Residual values and the end of a lease ===
At the end of the lease, the lessee is required by the contract to return the vehicle to the lessor. There will often be a term in the lease contract that requires a lessee who returns a vehicle at the end of the lease to make good any shortfall between the residual and the market value of the vehicle, if the market value is below the residual.

The residual value is an estimate of the market value of the vehicle at the end of the lease but because it is determined at the start of the lease and written into the contract, it may not reflect the actual market value of the vehicle at the end of the lease. In general, lessors are in the business of finance and not of selling used cars and so do not actually wish to take possession of the car and go to all the effort of converting it into cash. There cannot be an obligation or even a right for the lessee to purchase the vehicle as part of the contract, as the resulting arrangement would not be a bona fide lease, but instead a hire purchase or similar arrangement.

To enable/encourage lessees to keep the car rather than returning it, lease contracts usually contain terms which allow the lessee to pay a penalty for failing to return the vehicle, in the amount of the residual value. This legal fiction, that the lessee pays a penalty for refusing to return the vehicle as required by the contract, is in effect, a means whereby the lessee can "purchase" the vehicle from the lessor at the residual value at the end of the lease. This is so commonly done that employees may not even realise they can return the vehicle at the end of the lease.

Since the residual payment is not part of the salary packaging deal there is no tax saving when paying it, and so it is beneficial to the employee have a lease with the lowest possible residual value and for the rent to be higher to compensate, since tax savings are obtained on the rent when it is salary packaged. For this reason, the minimum value of a residual is restricted by the Australian Taxation Office although lower residual values are allowed "where a well considered and fair estimate of the likely market value of the item at the end of the lease would result in a lower value". In general, this means that the market value of the vehicle typically exceeds the residual, resulting in additional benefit to the employee, the difference between the market value and the residual. This benefit is not subject to FBT.

=== GST on the purchase price of a vehicle ===
In salary packaging advertising material, a benefit frequently claimed is that the employee "saves" the GST component of the purchase price of the vehicle. This claim plays on the lack of clarity of the salary packaging process - in fact, the employee is not buying the car at all. In a lease, the finance company (lessor) purchases the vehicle and pays the GST in the purchase. If the finance company is registered for GST, then they can then claim a credit for the GST.

The advertising implies that the cost to the employee of the lease is reduced by the amount of GST in the purchase price because of the credit claimed by the lessor. However, the way that GST works is that in every transaction, GST credits on costs are claimed by the business supplying the good or service, and then GST is included in the price paid by the purchaser to the business for the goods or services.

Since GST must be included in the rent and also in the residual by the lessor, this has the effect of increasing the total amount of GST to be paid in a lease compared to the original purchase, since the total of the rent and residual is a higher amount than the purchase price of the vehicle (to allow for costs and profits for the lessor), especially when GST exempt items such as stamp duty are bundled into the lease contract resulting in no GST to be claimed as a credit for that component of the purchase.

For example, if the driveaway price of a car is $57,000, being made up of $55,000 for the purchase, including $5000 in GST, and $2000 in stamp duty, then the finance company can claim a $5000 credit on the purchase. When they lease the car to an employee for 3 years, say with 36 monthly payments of rent at $1100 (i.e. $39,600 total rent) and a residual of $27,500, then this results in a total of $6100 in GST being paid by the lessee, more than in the original purchase. The net effect of the lease is an increase in GST being sent to the ATO, not a decrease.

As part of salary packaging arrangement, GST on running costs such as the rent, fuel, insurance, servicing etc can be claimed as a credit by the employer, resulting in an actual saving of this GST for the employee, but contrary to the marketing claims, employees cannot "save" both the GST in the rent and the GST in the purchase price.

=== Third party salary packaging companies ===
In Australia, salary packaging arrangements are usually outsourced by employers to third party salary packaging companies to reduce administrative load on the employer. In those cases, when a motor vehicle is salary packaged with a novated lease, the third party arranges the leasing of the vehicle (usually through another party), the novation, GST and FBT accounting, and budgeting for, and paying of, all running costs in exchange for a management fee, and possibly rebates/commissions from suppliers. The third party arranges for regular payments from the employer (and employee, if ECM is being used and paid directly to the employer) to cover the budgeted running costs (including their fee). These payments appear in a salary packaging account which shows the budget, payments in, and running costs being paid out. In addition, the employee may directly pay suppliers for running costs and then be reimbursed from their salary packaging account by the salary packaging company.

=== Confusing use of the term "novated lease" ===
While a novated lease does not have to be part of a salary packaging arrangement, it is unlikely to be used outside such an arrangement as there is otherwise no reason for the third party to undertake the obligation.

This near universal use of novated lease for motor vehicle salary packaging arrangements results in the arrangements being confusingly described as "novated leases" even though the arrangement involves far more than just the lease. This usage of "novated lease" is almost universal on documentation, advertising and the websites of salary packaging companies and leads to confusion about whether it is the whole arrangement or just the lease itself which is meant by the term. It is speculated that salary packaging companies make the process deliberately confusing so consumers cannot easily compare with other financing methods. By implying that they are the lessee rather than the actual other party (finance company), they could conceal any commissions being paid by finance companies. Employees may not realise they can shop around for the best deal on the lease with different finance companies while still using their employer's required salary packaging manager. Budgets are quoted without including GST, "tax savings" are shown using unrealistic comparisons and it is claimed that the vehicle is owned by the employee when it is in fact owned by the lessor. Consumers may be misled by statements like "Peace of mind that all your vehicle costs are packaged into one simple payment." into thinking that the "package" includes all running costs regardless of actual cost or usage, when it is actually only an estimate or budget for running costs.

Often the employee deals only with the salary packaging manager for the entire process, with no interaction at all with the lessor or the employer. In addition, salary reductions still appear as income on their pay slip, shown as "pre-tax" deductions and employee contributions are shown as "post-tax" deductions. It therefore appears to the employee that they are directly paying the running costs of the motor vehicle (albeit in some strange tax beneficial way), even though by definition in salary packaging the employer is paying the costs. In addition, the leased vehicle is effectively their personal vehicle, chosen by them, available for their exclusive use, and they have the option to "purchase" it at the end of the lease by failing to return it and paying the penalty.

=== Confusion on novated lease "interest rates" ===
By definition leases do not have interest rates since interest applies to borrowed money, being payable on an outstanding balance. A lease is an agreement to use an asset in exchange for a periodic payment and there is no borrowed money or any outstanding balance for interest to apply to.

It is frequently considered by employees that a salary packaging arrangement including a novated lease is some kind of loan which includes all running costs for the vehicle. This confusion is compounded by salary packaging companies and finance companies who quote interest rates for leases or call them loans in their information.

It seems likely that employees considering a novated lease but confusing the lease with a loan have started asking finance companies and/or salary packaging management companies to provide an interest rate for the "loan" (lease), similar to the standardised comparison rate required to be quoted for loans in Australia, to allow them to compare the cost of the lease with other offers without having to actually calculate the total cost themselves. Many of these companies have obliged by quoting an "effective" or "calculated" interest rate, but since there is no actual interest in a lease, it is not clear how these quoted interest rates are calculated, including how they treat the effects of GST, deferred payments or bundled fees or other costs. There is no standardised way to calculate an effective interest rate for a lease, and therefore the quoted rates cannot be compared with loans or the rates quoted for other leases.

=== Types of novated lease ===
The confusion also extends to the terms used by salary packaging companies to describe different salary packaging arrangements which include a novated lease.

The first term is "fully maintained novated lease", describing the most common type of salary packaging arrangement, where a finance lease is novated, so the employer agrees to pay the rental payments. In addition, the employer also pays other running costs which are not included in the lease . This terminology is confusing as outside of salary packaging, a "fully maintained lease", describes an operating lease where the lease contract includes in the rental payments the fixed running costs of a vehicle or asset, such as insurance, registration, servicing and roadside assistance as well as some variable costs like fuel and tyres. The lessor simply hands back the vehicle at the end of the lease with the lessor assuming the residual value risk. There are usually terms in the contract with penalties or fees to protect the lessor from excessive costs and depreciation of the asset. Thus, a fully maintained novated lease is not a novation of a fully maintained lease.

It is possible to novate a fully maintained lease; this may be called a fully maintained novated operating lease.

To make things more confusing, it is also very common to include up front costs over and above the purchase cost, such as stamp duty, registration, the first year's comprehensive insurance, extended warranties and other insurances and fees, into the lease in a fully maintained novated lease, since there will not have been sufficient time to set up the payments by the employer into the salary packaging account to cover those costs. For this reason, it is also common for novated leases to have deferred payments, that is, the first one or two rentals are set at $0, with the remaining rentals increased to compensate.

The third type of lease is described as a novated finance lease or non-maintained novated lease where only the novated lease itself is salary packaged, with none of the other running costs such as fuel, insurance or maintenance being paid by the employer. This arrangement is of little or no benefit to the employee as there is no change to the fringe benefit value, being based on the original purchase price, but any tax benefits on the other running costs are lost as they are not salary packaged. The effect of paying FBT or using ECM offsets most or all the potential tax benefits from salary packaging the lease rentals alone.

=== Benefits and pitfalls of salary packaged novated leases ===
For the employee:

- Income tax and GST savings:

While a salary packaged novated lease has the potential to yield tax benefits for the employee, providing net savings on the overall cost of purchasing and running a motor vehicle, the complexity of the process and lack of transparency makes it difficult for most people to evaluate the extent of the benefits. Salary packaging companies will usually provide a comparison stating projected savings, but this only compares leasing the vehicle with the same estimated costs without the benefit of salary packaging. This is unlikely to be how a motor vehicle would actually be purchased in Australia, in most cases a car or personal loan or some other source of funds such as savings or redraw from a home mortgage would be used. Additional costs of leasing and fees can mean the raw running costs of a salary packaged novated lease are significantly higher than the equivalent costs of private ownership with a loan, but with the benefits of tax savings, the net cost can be lower. In addition, tax deductions for any business use of a vehicle are specifically disallowed for a salary packaged novated lease.

- Access to negotiated or volume discounts if the finance company/salary packaging company/employer purchases many vehicles from a car manufacturer:

Salary packaging companies often claim to be able to access to fleet discounts on the purchase price of vehicles that are not available to individuals. In some cases, these may be only on specific makes or models of vehicle and may be no greater or even lower than discounts which can be negotiated by an individual with a dealer. There is generally no reason why the salary packaging manager needs to be involved in the negotiation, instead an individual cannot negotiate an acceptable purchase price, then arrange a lease which is then novated and the vehicle salary packaged. In some cases, the salary packaging manager charges a brokerage fee for managing the vehicle purchase. Significant savings can be obtained by salary packaging a novated lease on a cheaper used or demonstrator vehicle. Additional volume discounts may also be available on insurance or servicing arranged by the salary packaging company, but contrariwise, they may be more expensive than those privately arranged.

- Perceived benefits that are greater than actual benefits:

Advertising by salary packaging providers emphasising the tax benefits of a salary packaged novated lease, the out of sight nature of salary reduction/deduction and a lack of understanding of how salary packaging actually works may induce employees to lease vehicles with costs far in excess of what they would ordinarily spend, or to continually revolve leases with the mistaken impression that the cost is equivalent or lower than keeping their existing car.

- Convenience of third party management:

There is a perceived benefit in not having to budget or worry about paying for running costs, especially large once per year costs. However, budget shortfalls are common complaints in salary packaging, and there is significant additional paperwork in salary packaging, especially if reimbursement requests are required.

- Flexibility in the choice of a car compared to a company car arrangement
- Vehicle stays with the employee and can be transferred to a new employer:

However the counter to this is if the employee wants or needs to sell the vehicle during the term of the lease, breaking the lease contract can be very expensive, sometimes far in excess of the current market value of the vehicle.

For the employer:

- A way to provide an effective increase in employees' salaries with no or minimal cost to the business
- A cost-effective alternative to operating a fleet of company vehicles
- Compared to company cars, the business does not assume any risk for the vehicles
- Compared to company cars, employee vehicles are "off balance sheet", they are not owned by or liabilities for the employer
- Compared to company cars, the employer is not stuck with the vehicle if the employee leaves.

For the service providers:

- They provide various services for fees and/or commissions.

== Novated leases in the United Kingdom ==
In the UK, a novated lease refers to a car lease which has been novated (transferred) to a third party with the consent of the lessor, the original lessee and the prospective lessee. The transfer of liability for the lease, between two legal entities, is normally covered by tripartite contract.

Swapping car leases is a relatively new phenomenon in the UK (and a number of online services are starting to appear), although the market for novating leases is well established in the United States.

== See also ==
- Fringe benefits
- Fringe benefits tax (Australia)
- Finance lease
- Operating lease
- Salary packaging
