= Fleet vehicle =

Motor vehicle from a group

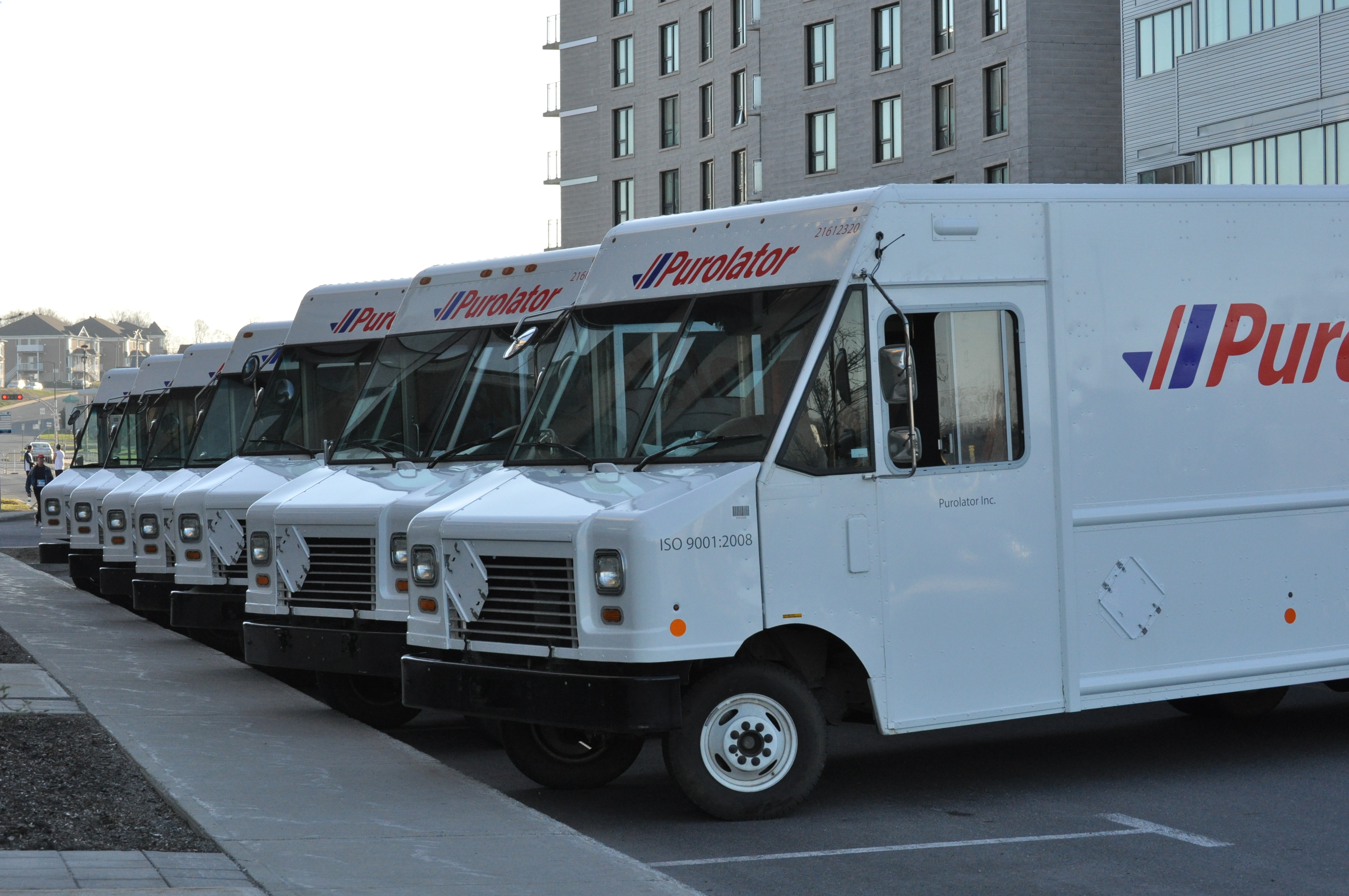
Multi-stop trucks owned and operated as fleet vehicles

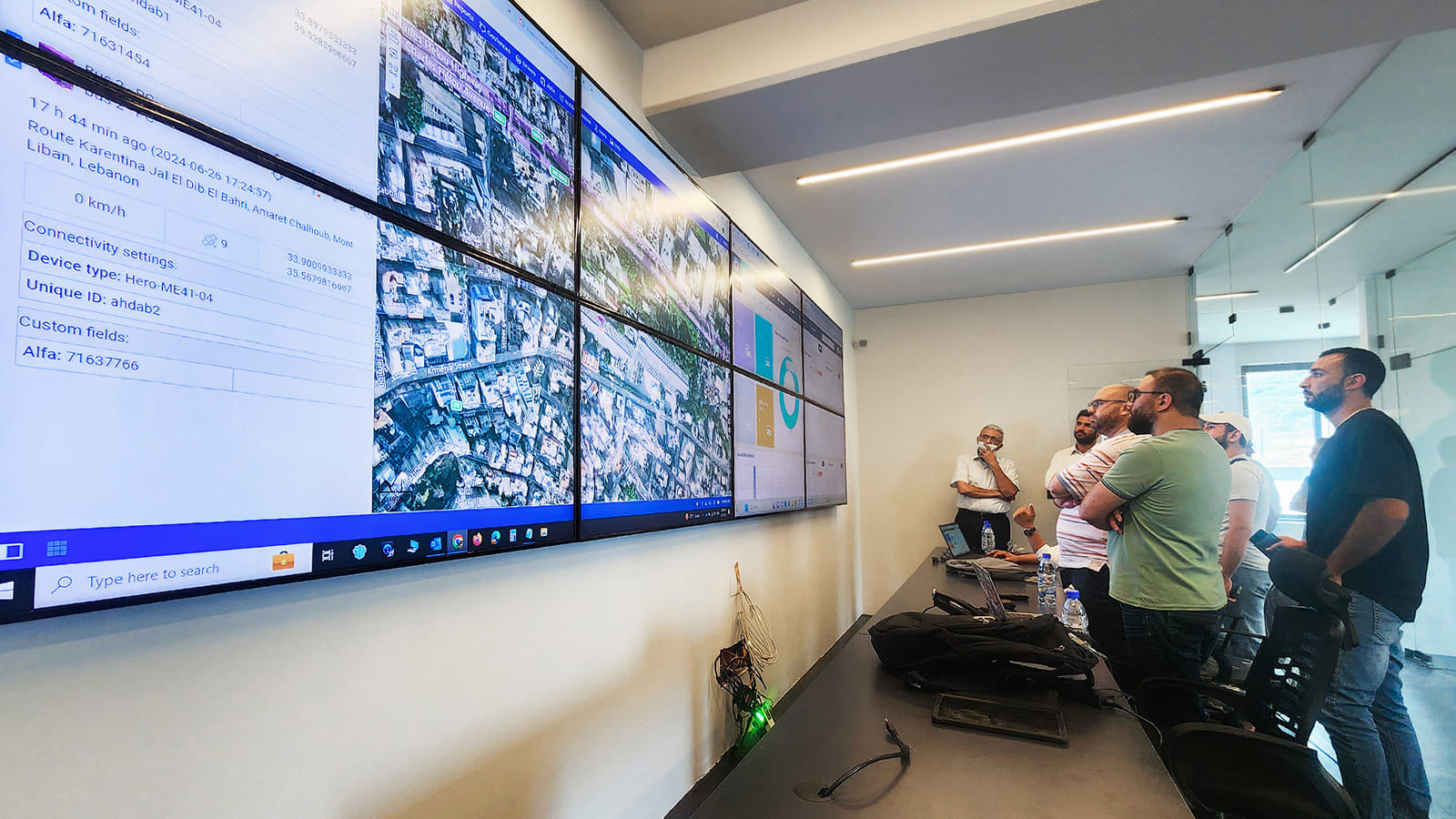
A transport control room where staff monitor a vehicle fleet in real-time.

A fleet vehicle is a vehicle owned or leased by a business, government agency, or other organization rather than by an individual or family. Typical examples include vehicles operated by car rental companies, taxicab companies, public utilities, public transport, and emergency services.

Many businesses purchase or lease fleet vehicles to deliver goods to customers, as well as providing vehicles for sales representatives to travel to clients. In some jurisdictions and countries, fleet vehicles can also be privately owned by employees. These vehicles are often called the "grey fleet" and are used for work purposes. Fleet vehicles can be managed by a fleet manager or transport manager using fleet management software. Vehicles may be connected to a fleet telematics system by way of a Fleet Management System, also known as an FMS.

== Federal Vehicle Fleet ==
In the United States, "Federal Vehicle Fleet" refers to the federal government's vehicles.

== See also ==
- Corporate car sharing
- Fleet card
- Fleet management software
- Fleet Management System
- Fleet Special
- Take-home vehicle
- Vehicle remarketing
