= Fleet special =

A fleet special is a term applied to an automobile that is produced by a manufacturer with the express intent of it being sold in large volumes to corporate interests for business purposes rather than to consumers for personal use.

In the 1950s and 1960s, fleet special models were usually stripped down full size cars such as the Plymouth Savoy, Chevrolet Biscayne and Ford Custom 500.

Fleet special vehicles can be customized in equipment (all red cars with grey interiors, etc.) or for a specific purpose (Ford Police Interceptor) model.

An automobile can also be produced for a specific industry if the demand is sufficient to meet cost/volume factors. In the case of the rental car industry in the United States, General Motors produced the Chevrolet Classic (previously built as the Chevrolet Malibu until 2003) which was only available for fleet sales to rental car companies.
