= Fringe benefits tax (New Zealand) =

Fringe benefits tax (FBT) within the system of taxation in New Zealand is the tax applied to most, although not all, fringe benefits ("perks"), including the ones provided through someone other than an employer. FBT is paid to Inland Revenue by the employer and is calculated with reference to the taxable value of the benefit provided to the employee or associate.

== Legislation ==
Legislation governing what a fringe benefit is, and is not, is contained within part CX of the Income Tax Act 2007. The imposition of FBT is contained within part RD of the Income Tax Act 2007.

The categories of benefits include motor vehicles, low-interest loans, free, subsidised or discounted goods and services, employer contributions to funds, insurance and superannuation schemes and other benefits.

== Paying FBT ==
FBT filing may be quarterly, finance year, or annual tax returns. Taxpayers must pay quarterly unless they qualify for, and have elected to, use another period for filing.

Since 1 April 2001, FBT has been payable using one of two options. The Single Rate Option (whereby FBT is paid at the highest FBT rate on all employees), or the alternate rate option (formerly the multi-rate option, which involves attribution of benefits to individual employees and pooling of non-attributable benefits and certain de minimis benefits). There is a 'short form' way of calculating under the alternate rate option, which is simply to pool non-attributable and de minimis benefits but pay the highest rate of FBT on remaining benefits rather than attribute to employees.

New Zealand FBT rates are determined by grossing up personal income tax rates. As such, FBT rates are updated when personal income tax rates are changed.

2011 FBT (1 April 2010 – 31 March 2011)

Due to a change in income tax rates from 1 October 2010 (mid tax year), the FBT rates for 2011 are blended for the year.

- Single rate option – 61% for Q1-Q2, 49.25% for Q3-Q4
- Alternate rate option – 49% or 61% for Q1-Q2, 43% or 49% for Q3, Alternate rate calculation in Q4
- Alternate rate option pooling – 45.99% for employee pool and 55.04% for shareholder pool

2010 FBT (1 April 2009 – 31 March 2010)

- Single rate option – 61% for all quarters
- Alternate rate option – 49% or 61% for Q1-Q3, Alternate rate calculation in Q4
- Alternate rate option pooling – 49% for employee pool and 61% for shareholder pool

Prior years

As of 2006, there are three methods of rate calculation for FBT: flat rate (64%), multi-rate and short form multi-rate options. .
