= Folate-biopterin transporter family =

Protein family

The folate-biopterin transporter (FBT) family (TC# 2.A.71) is a distant family within the major facilitator superfamily, most closely related to drug resistance permeases. Proteins of the FBT family are reported to contain about 480 to 650 amino acyl residues. All probably have 12 transmembrane α-helical segments (TMSs). They may function by H^{+} symport.

== Transport reaction ==
The probable transport reaction catalyzed by characterized FBT family members is:

[folate, biopterin, or AdoMet] (out) + H^{+} (out) → [folate, biopterin, or AdoMet] (in) + H^{+} (in)

== Functionally characterized members ==
The FBT family includes functionally characterized members from protozoa, cyanobacteria and plants. Functionally characterized members of the family include FT1, the major folate transporter, and BT1, the biopterin/folate transporter and AdoMetT1, the major S-adenosylmethionine uptake porter. A related protein in Trypanosoma brucei, ESAGIO, shows weak folate/biopterin transport activity. There are at least 6 homologues of the FT1 transporter in Leishmania encoded by tandem genes.
