= Holden Gemini =

Australian compact car

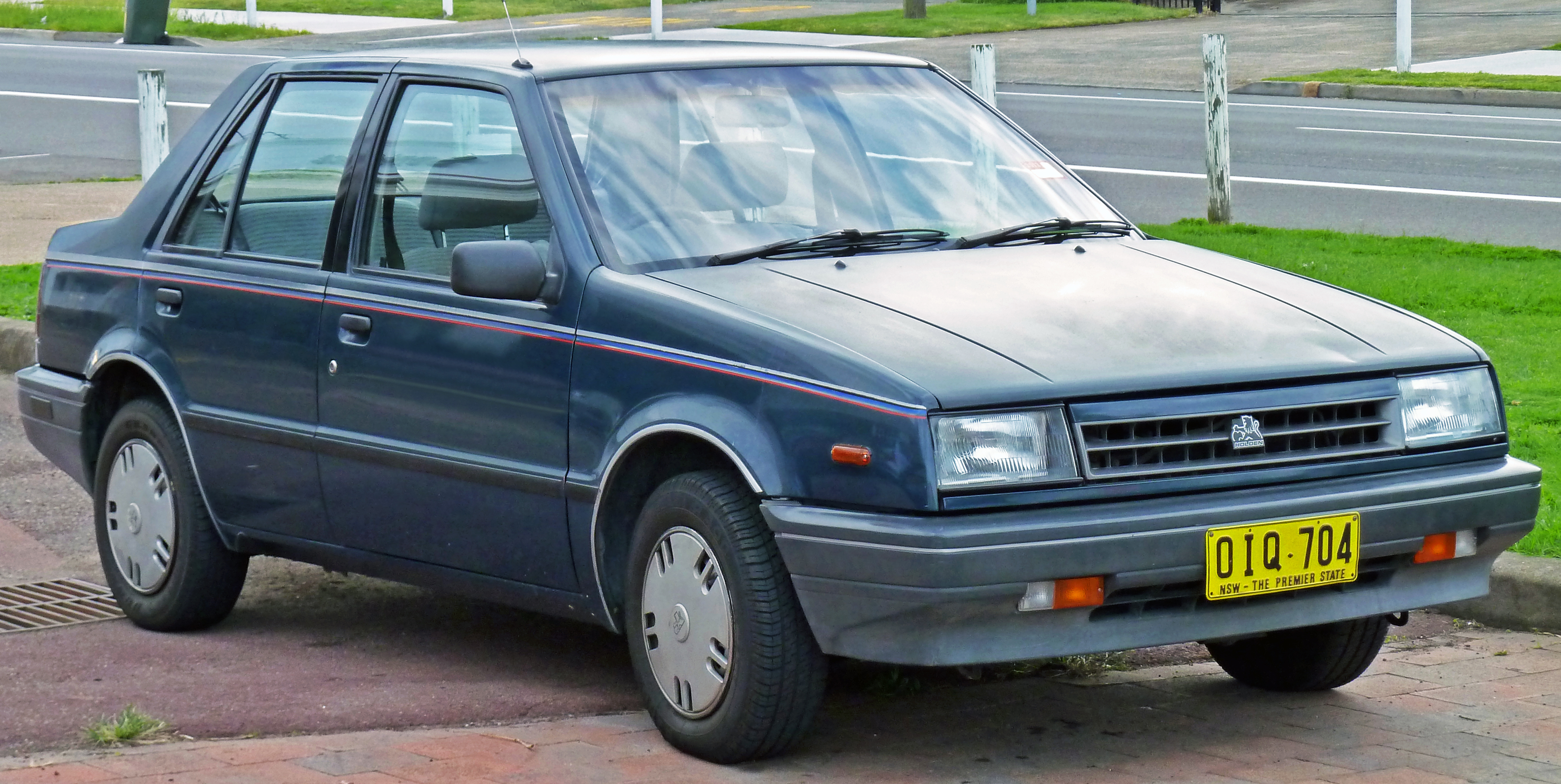

Overview
- Manufacturer: Holden (General Motors)
- Production: 1975–1987

Body and chassis
- Class: Compact

The Holden Gemini is a compact car that was produced by Holden and sold in Australia from 1975 to 1987. It was based on the Japanese Isuzu Gemini, one of the many models based on the GM T-car platform.

== First generation ==
First generation
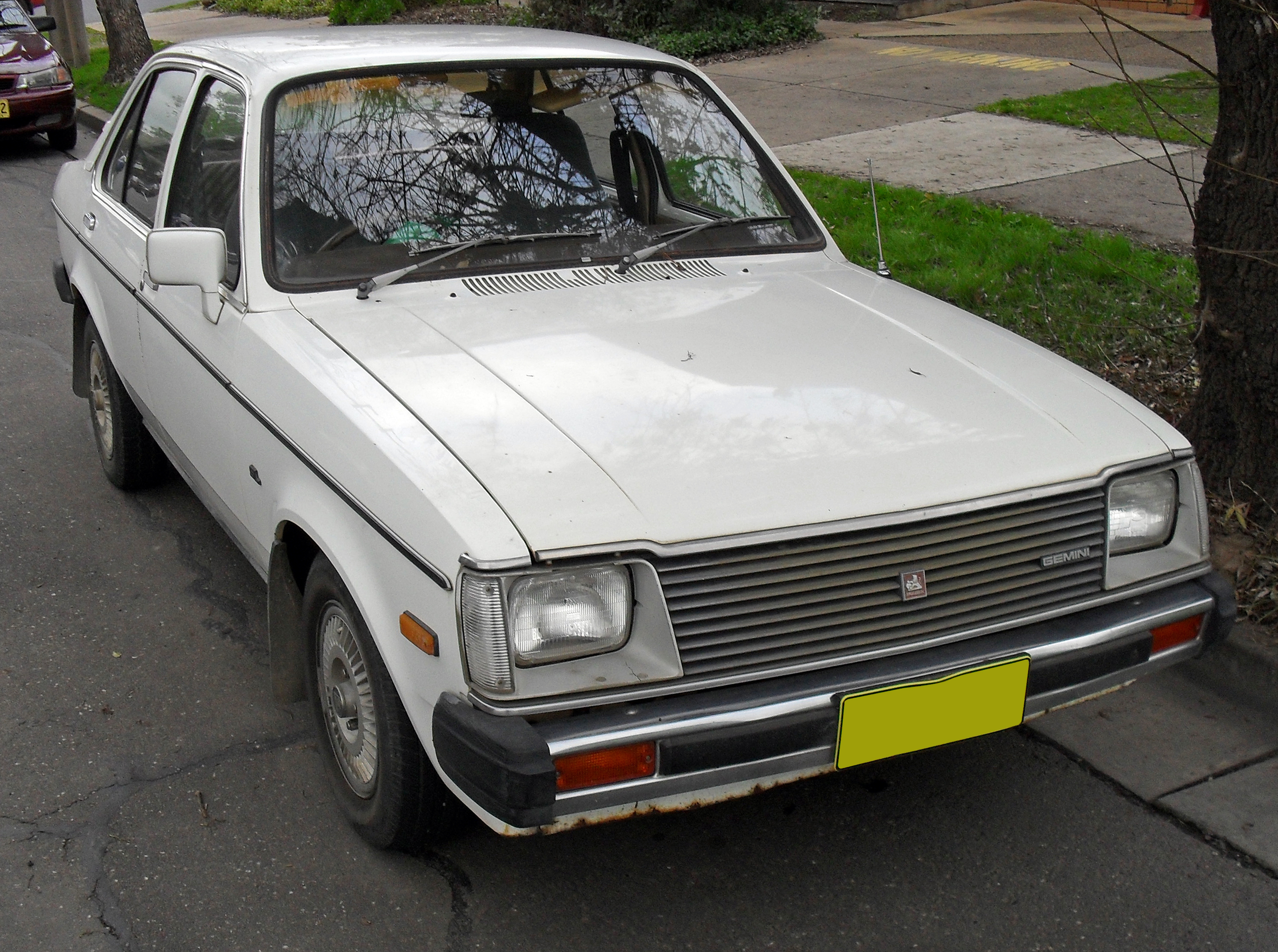
- Holden Gemini (TE) SL sedan

Overview
- Production: March 1975 – October 1984
- Assembly: Australia: Brisbane, Queensland (Acacia Ridge)

Body and chassis
- Body style: 2-door coupe 3-door panel van 3-door station wagon 4-door sedan
- Layout: Front engine, rear-wheel drive
- Platform: T-body
- Related: Other T-body cars: Buick Opel; Chevrolet Chevette; Daewoo Maepsy-Na; Isuzu Gemini; Opel Kadett C; Opel K 180; Saehan Gemini/Maepsy; Vauxhall Chevette

Powertrain
- Engine: 1584 cc G161Z I4; 1817 cc 4FB1 diesel I4 (TE/TF/TG)
- Transmission: 5-speed manual 4-speed manual 3-speed automatic

Dimensions
- Wheelbase: 2,404 mm (94.6 in)
- Length: 4,234 mm (166.7 in)
- Width: 1,570 mm (61.8 in)
- Height: 1,341 mm (52.8 in)
- Curb weight: 956 kg (2,108 lb)

=== TX (1975–1977) ===
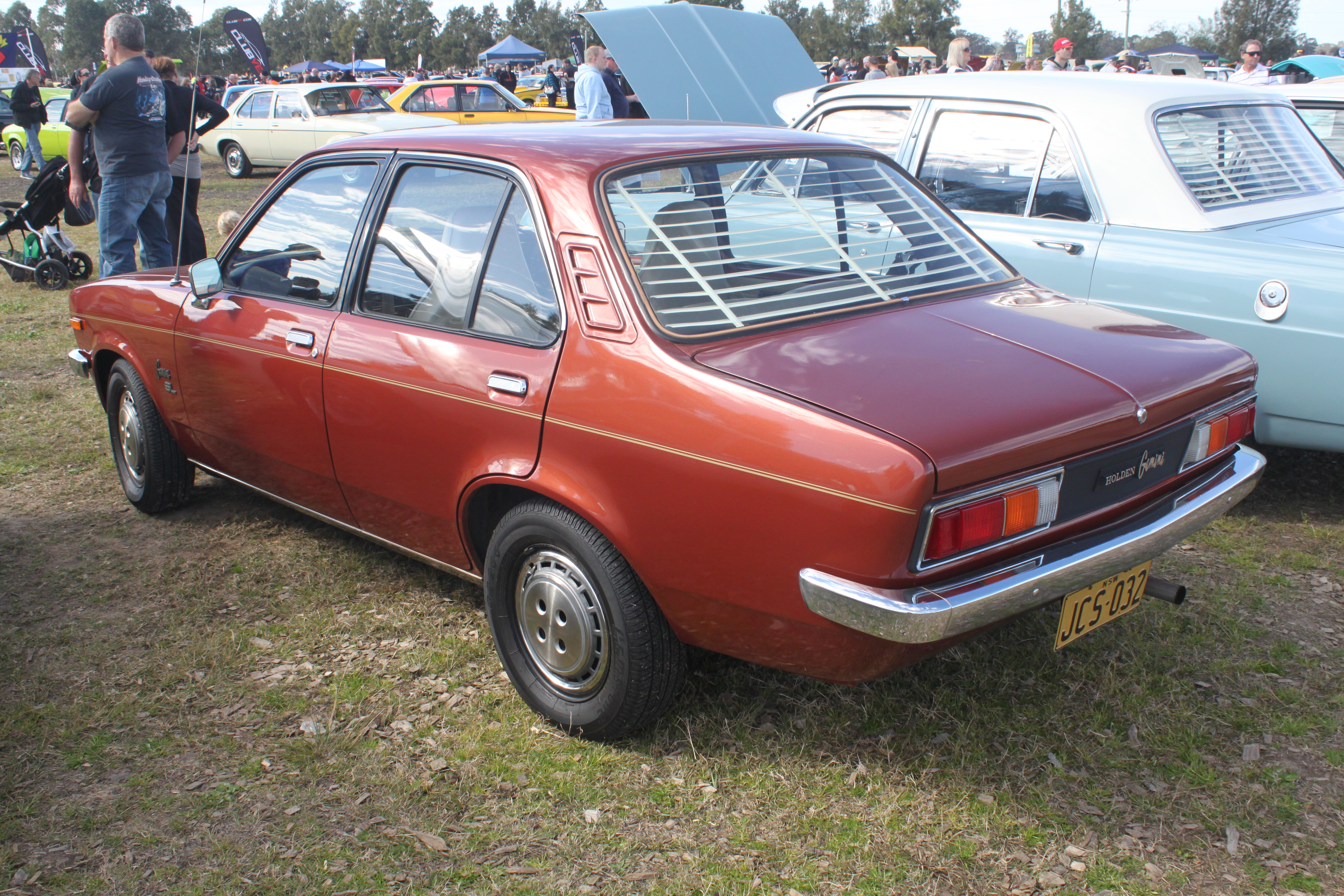
Holden Gemini SL sedan (TX)

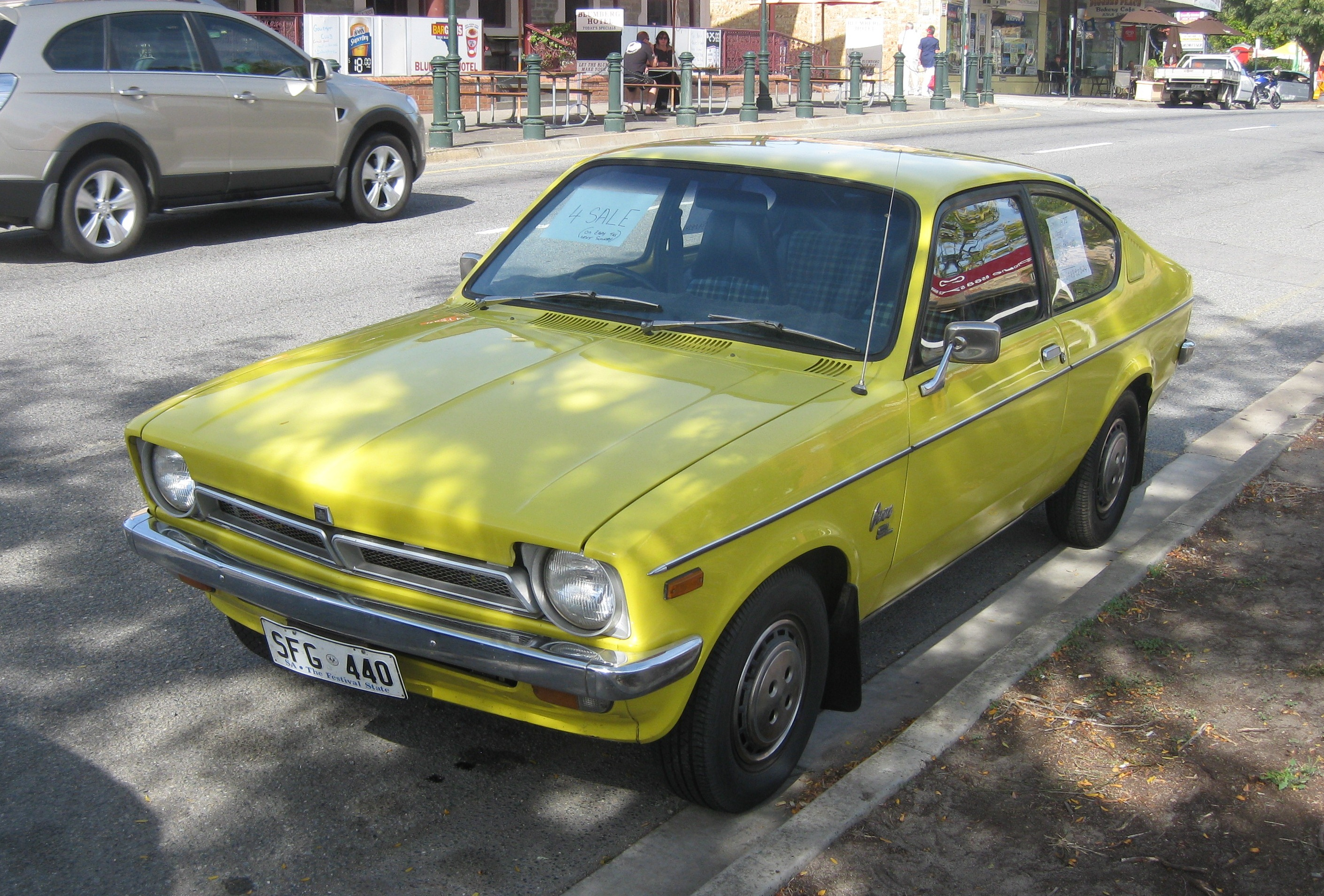
Holden Gemini SL coupe (TX)

The original Holden Gemini model, the TX series, was introduced in February 1975. It was available as a four-door sedan in S and SL specification levels, and as a two-door SL coupe. The TX Gemini was built at Holden's Acacia Ridge, and contained a high percentage of Australian content.

All TX models share the same 1.6-litre SOHC Isuzu engine (coded the G161Z). The engine is chain-driven and incorporates a cross-flow design, alloy head. A two-barrel "Nikki" Stromberg carburettor was used on Australian models. Early TX models use a cast-iron, free-flow exhaust manifold, with two outlets into a "Y" pipe (this item is commonly used by modifiers for later models). From November 1976, this was changed to a single-outlet exhaust header.

Wheel size is 13 in × 4.5 in; rear brakes are duo-servo units, similar in design to those used in the six-cylinder Torana. Early models use the MSE-type four-speed manual transmissions; reverse is positioned to the left and back. November 1975 had the introduction of the MSG-type four-speed; reverse on this transmission was to the right and back position. The TX SL sedan was voted Wheels Car of the Year for 1975, and was the most popular four-cylinder car on the Australian market.

=== TC (1977–1978) ===
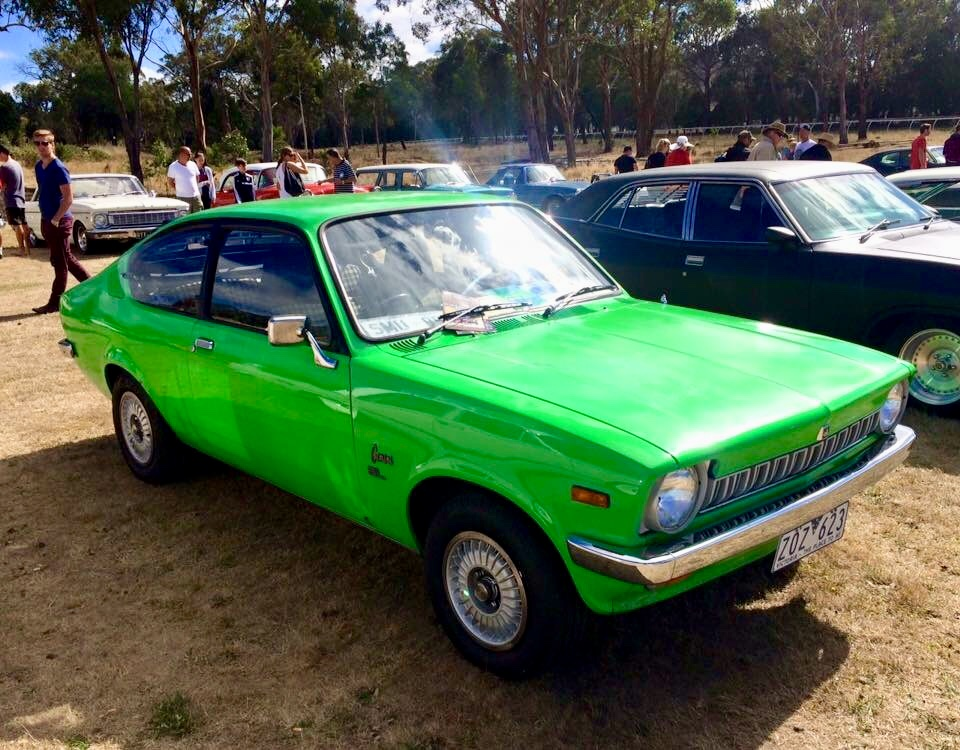
1977 Holden Gemini TC SL coupe

The TC Gemini was sold between March 1977 and April 1978. This model received a minor facelift from the TX, appearance was enhanced by a bolder vertical front grille, and at the rear, a silver garnish panel (as opposed to the TX's black). A new Smiths-brand heater, defogger, and ventilation system was used, and the two small vents at each end of the dash were removed on this model, except on vehicles fitted with air conditioning.

A "Fashion Pack" interior was now available on both sedan and coupe models; this option was also upgraded to add steel-belted radials and a front stabilising bar. Door side-impact beams were introduced to improve safety, and SL coupes had a heated rear windscreen.

In April 1977, a limited-edition "Sandpiper" model was also offered in both sedan and coupe bodies. They were identified by a black grille with stainless steel top edge, gold pin stripes, chequered cloth seat inserts and door trims, wood-grain dash sections, radio/cassette player, a four-spoke steering wheel, and the A9R (Fashion Pack) suspension package. Externally, they were easily identified by the word "Sandpiper" and a bird decal on the side rear quarters of the coupe and on the rear doors of the sedans.

Gemini TC production totalled 17,257 units.

=== TD (1978–1979) ===
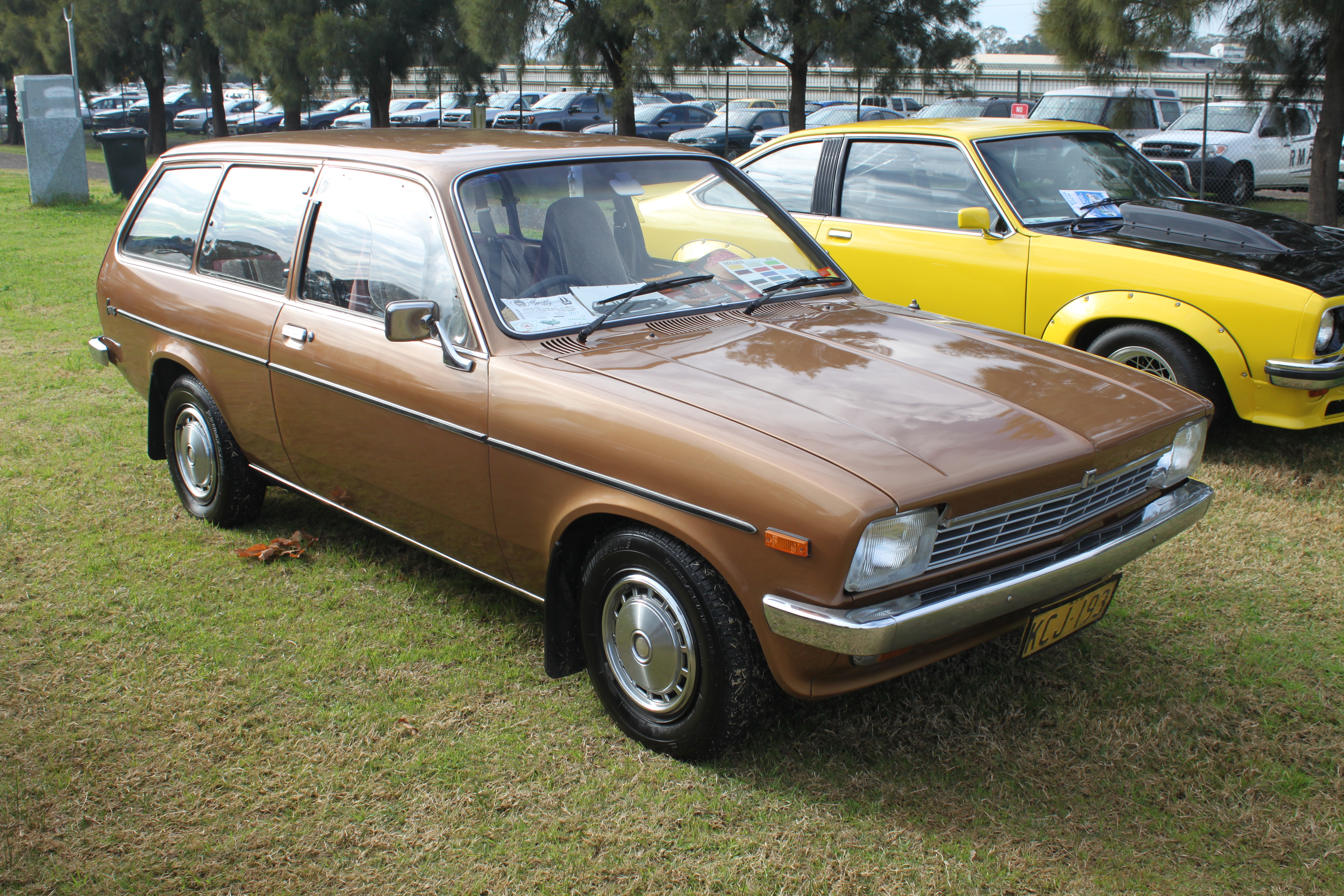
Holden Gemini (TD) wagon

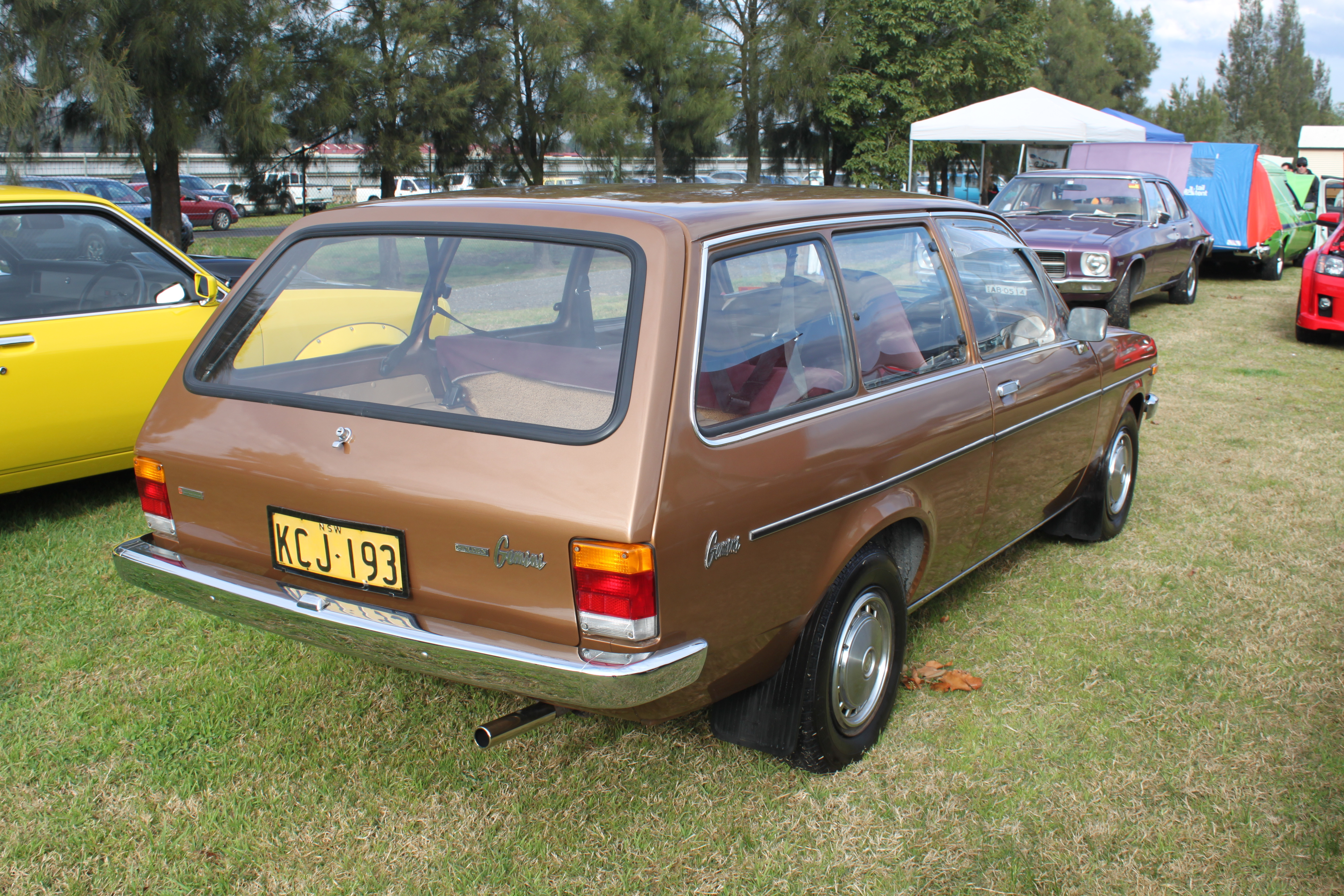
Holden Gemini (TD) wagon

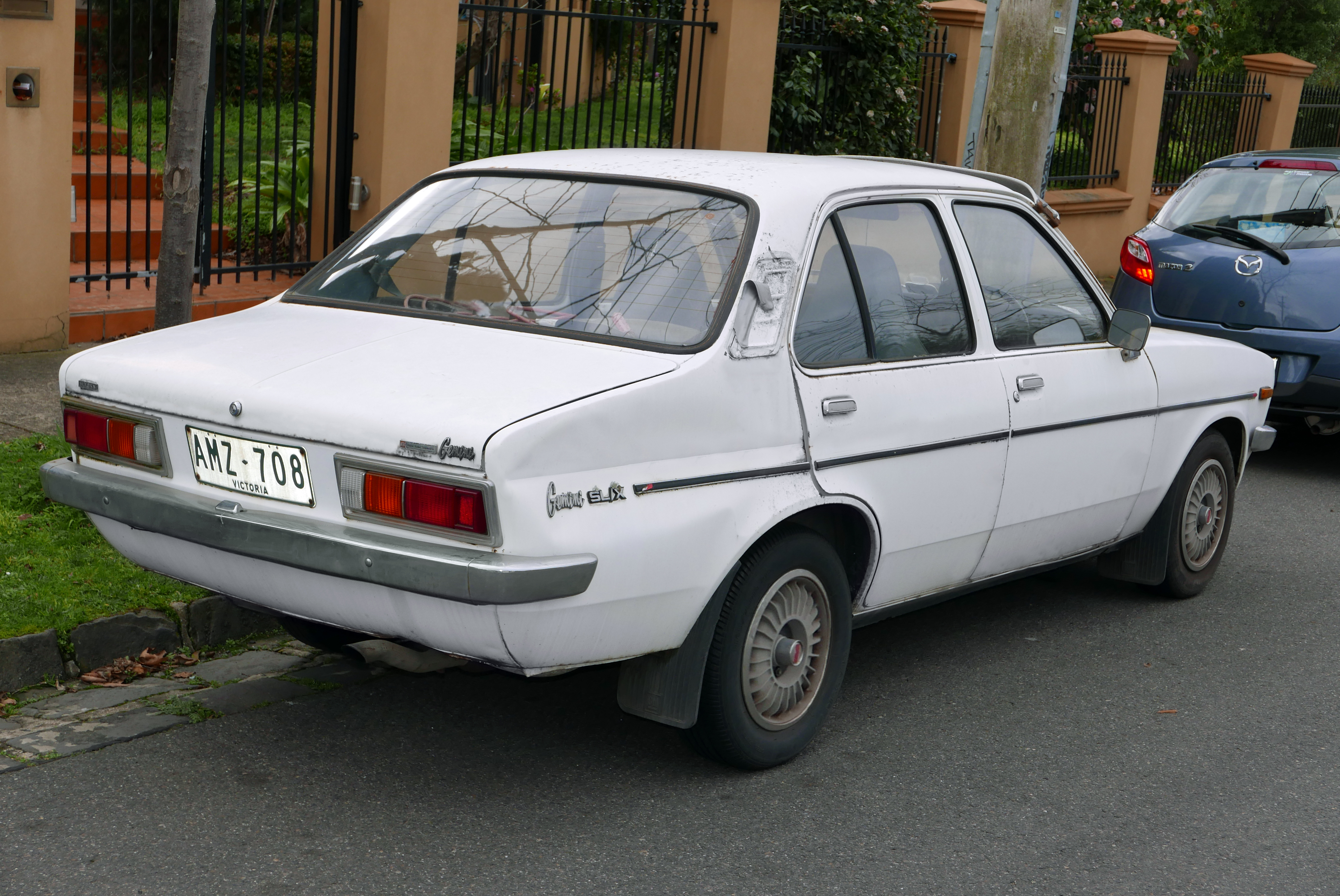
Gemini (TD) SLX sedan

The TD series was introduced in April 1978, with the most major change over the TC being the introduction of "radial tuned suspension" and the option of a five-speed manual transmission. The differential was replaced with a small Salisbury unit as used in the UC Torana; it used tapered Timken wheel bearings as found on all larger Holdens since mid-1971. In April 1979, the rear brakes were changed to Commodore leading-trailing rear drum assemblies.

Exterior appearance was changed with the introduction of a new grille, rectangular headlights (round on base models), wheels were now 13 × 5 inches, and the rear number plate was relocated in place of the rear garnish panel. A panel van and three-door wagon were also added to the range, bodywork pressings being from the British Vauxhall Chevette/Bedford Chevanne range.

Also new was the SL/E version, which used many interior options from the TC "Sandpiper" series, such as the radio/cassette, four-spoke steering wheel, timber dash inserts, velour seat trim, Cut-pile carpet, and timber (hardboard) door-trim inserts. The SL/E also received the five-speed manual transmission as standard.

Externally, appearance was further enhanced to include stainless steel headlight and grille surrounds, thick stainless steel door window-frame mouldings, and GM-H designed alloy wheels similar to Sunbird SL/E. Coupes and sedans had colour-coded side mirrors similar to those of Sunbird SL/E and HZ Sandman, door-trims were extended to cover the top of the doors.

The SL/E was replaced by the SL/X in early 1979. It had a slightly lower equipment level, but a more competitive price. Also, a limited-edition "Gypsy" package was optional on panel vans, which included extra instrumentation and identifying decals. Heated rear windscreens were now standard on all but base model sedans, panel vans, and wagons. Nylon plaid cloth inserts were available on SLs and wagons, and air conditioning was available as an optional accessory.

=== TE (1979–1982) ===
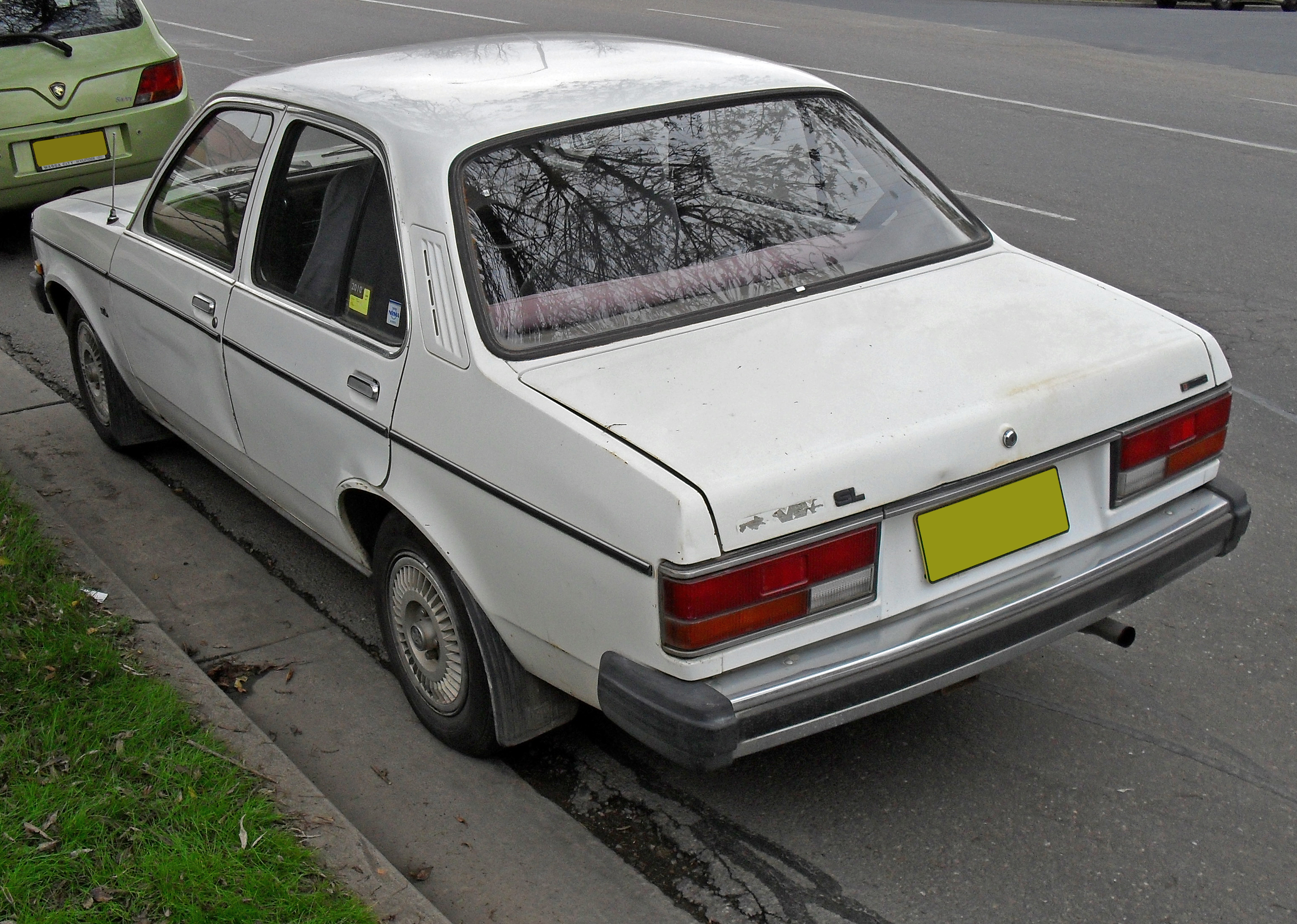
Holden Gemini (TE) SL sedan

The TE series Gemini was introduced in October 1979. It featured significant exterior changes with new front and rear styling, comparable with the Isuzu Gemini and Holden Commodore models of the same era. By this time, the Opel Kadett had been changed to front wheel drive and no longer resembled the original Kadett C.

The TE was the most popular of all the Geminis, selling over 70,000 units. Initially only available as a sedan, in February 1980, the panel van and station wagon were added to the line-up, while the coupé version was no longer available. The luxury SL/E version was also removed from the line-up, replaced instead with an SL/X variant. In 1981, the TE was introduced to New Zealand, replacing the British-sourced Vauxhall Chevette range.

A limited-edition "Gypsy" van was made available in February 1980 and was offered with a tachometer and console gauges. Individual plaid cloth seats were available (a different plaid from other earlier Geminis). The Gypsy featured blacked-out grille treatment and door window surrounds, square headlights, full chrome bumpers, and full-length headlining and carpet (regular vans had vinyl flooring as standard). Gypsys are now a highly collectible Gemini model.

Engine options originally stayed the same. In early 1981, the option of a 1.8-litre Isuzu diesel model was introduced, fitted with an M76 five-speed gearbox. This one was also a strong seller in Indonesia, where it was mostly used as a taxi. In Australia, all diesel Geminis were only available as SL/X five-speed manuals. Rhone green was a colour made available exclusively for the diesel, but other colours in the range could be ordered. Production of the diesel commenced in March 1981.

=== TF (1982–1983) ===
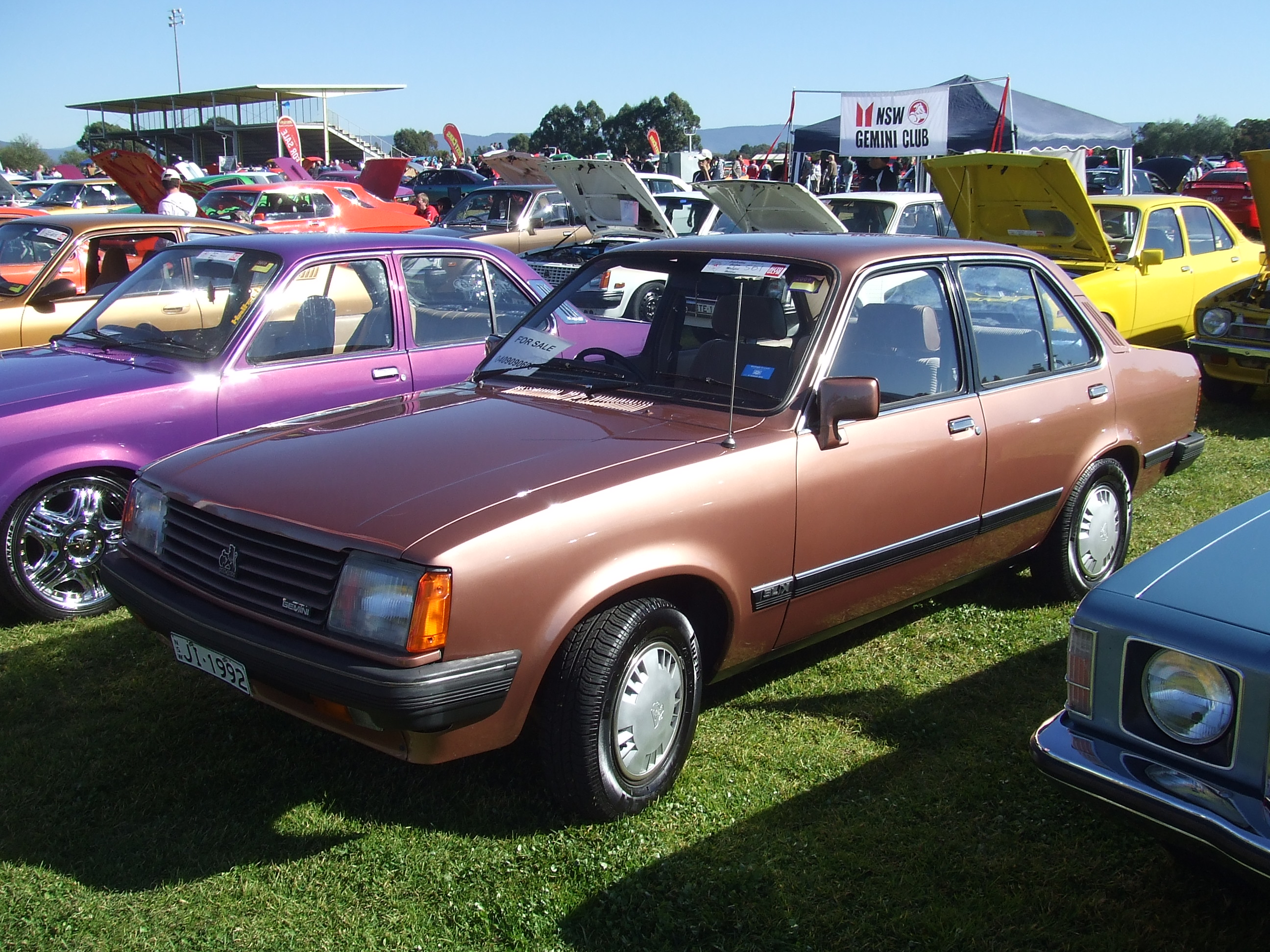
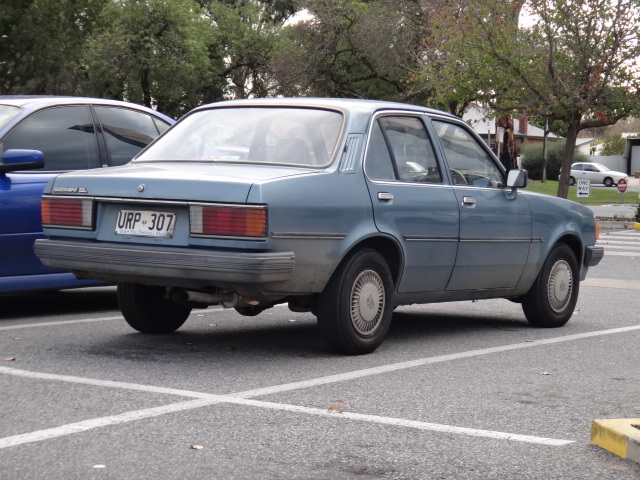
Holden Gemini (TF) SL sedan

The facelifted TF series Gemini was released in March 1982. It was offered in four-door sedan, three-door wagon, and two-door van variants. All models gained new grille treatments, and the SL/X variant received flush headlamps. The interior received major revisions with a new dashboard (creating the impression of more space in the vehicle) and a relocated steering column that put the steering wheel in line with the driver, rather than angled towards the centre of the car. The styling is often compared to the then-current VH Commodore range, but in fact the styling was introduced on the Isuzu Gemini in 1981 and carried across to the Australian model.

=== TG (1983–1984) ===
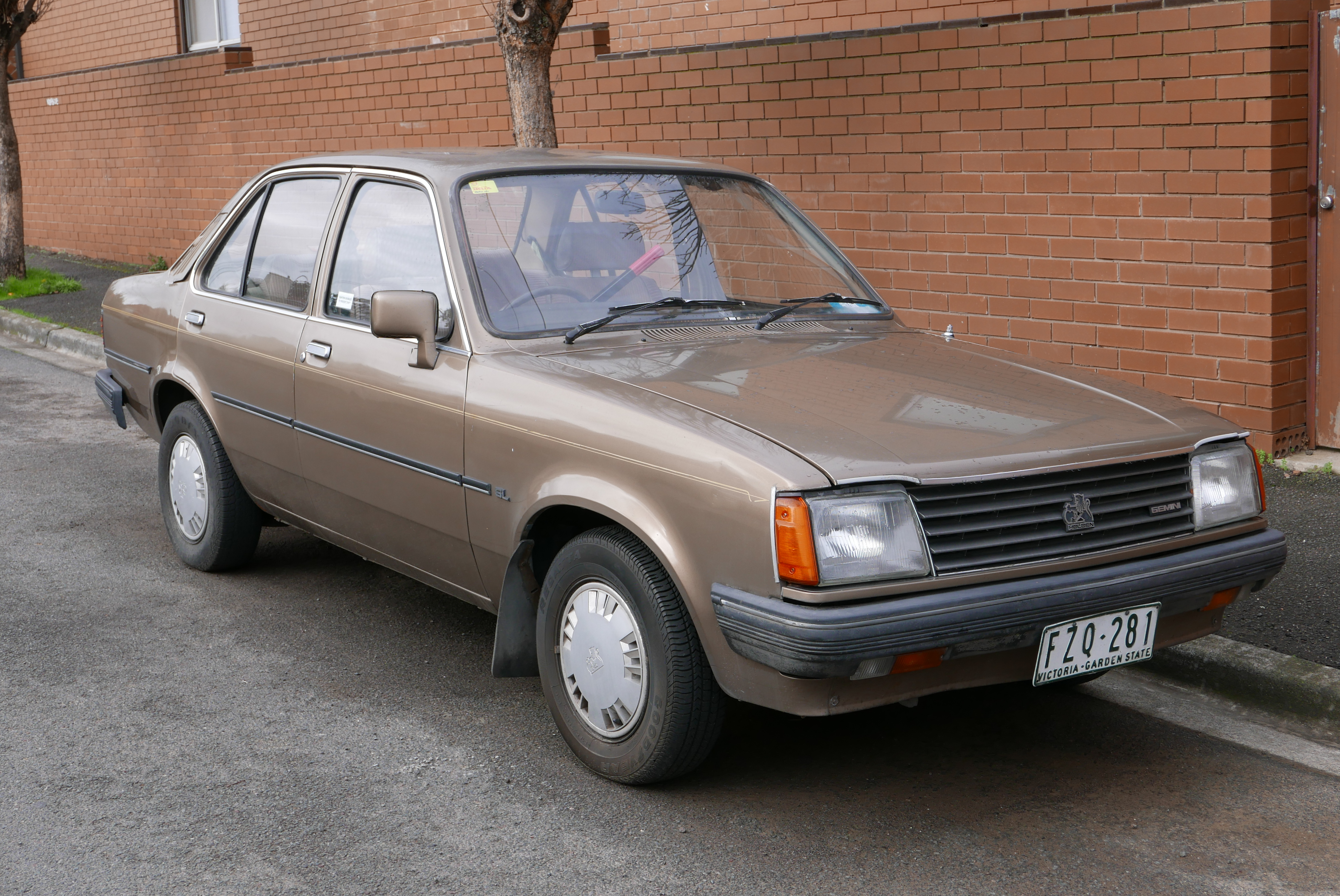
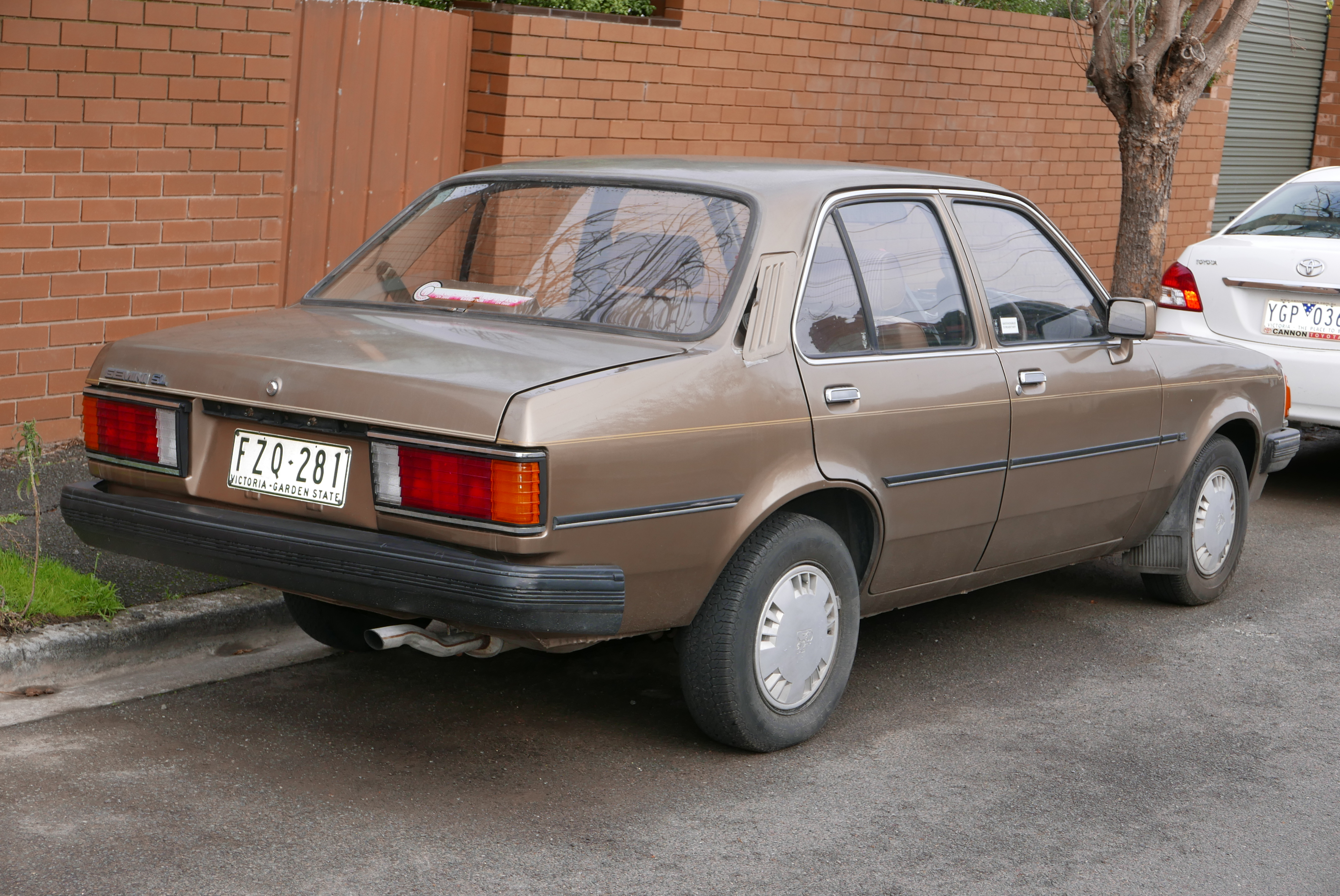
Holden Gemini (TG) SL sedan

The TG series was released in March 1983. The SL and SL/X versions of TG had an appearance exactly like the TF SL/X, with the flush head lamps, plastic bumpers, and tail lights very similar to that on a VH Commodore. However, the base model of the TG continued the TF theme, with many examples now confused for TF models. Base-model vehicles had vinyl seats, no clock or cigarette lighter, and no console around the shifter. The engine continued to be the 66 PS (49 kW) 1.6-litre as per previous versions, with the optional 54 PS (40 kW) 1.8 diesel also available.

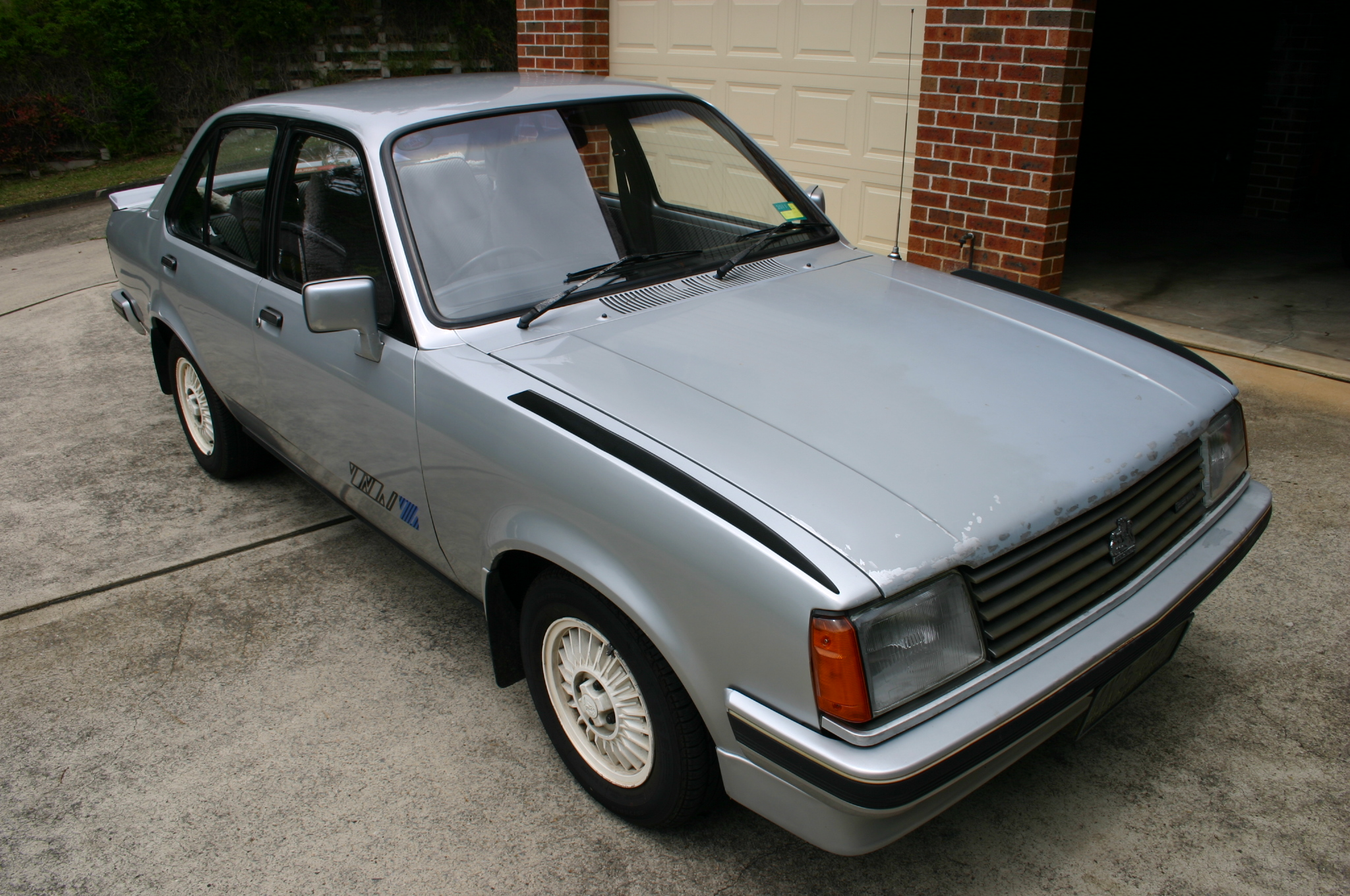
Holden Gemini (TG) ZZ/Z sedan

In 1983, a performance model, named the ZZ/Z (triple zed), was added. The ZZ/Z was always silver, with a body kit consisting of a front bar, wind splitters on top of the guards, a bobtail boot spoiler, alloy wheels, and blue and black ZZ/Z decals. The ZZ/Z was often thought to come with the twin-cam engine that was used in the Isuzu Gemini ZZ/R of the same era, but the ZZ/Z was strictly a cosmetic version and came with the standard running gear of other models. A five-speed manual gearbox was standard, with somewhat altered gearing; an automatic transmission was not available.

The Gemini was built in Holden's Acacia Ridge plant, which closed in October 1984 after all Gemini production had come to a halt. However, wagon and panel-van production came to a gradual halt in mid-1984, as Vauxhall had ended production of the roof and the tailgate used on these models. Sourcing the parts from General Motors' Brazilian operation was considered, but was too complicated for the short time the model had left. Sales of the sedan continued into early 1985.

== Second generation ==
Second generation
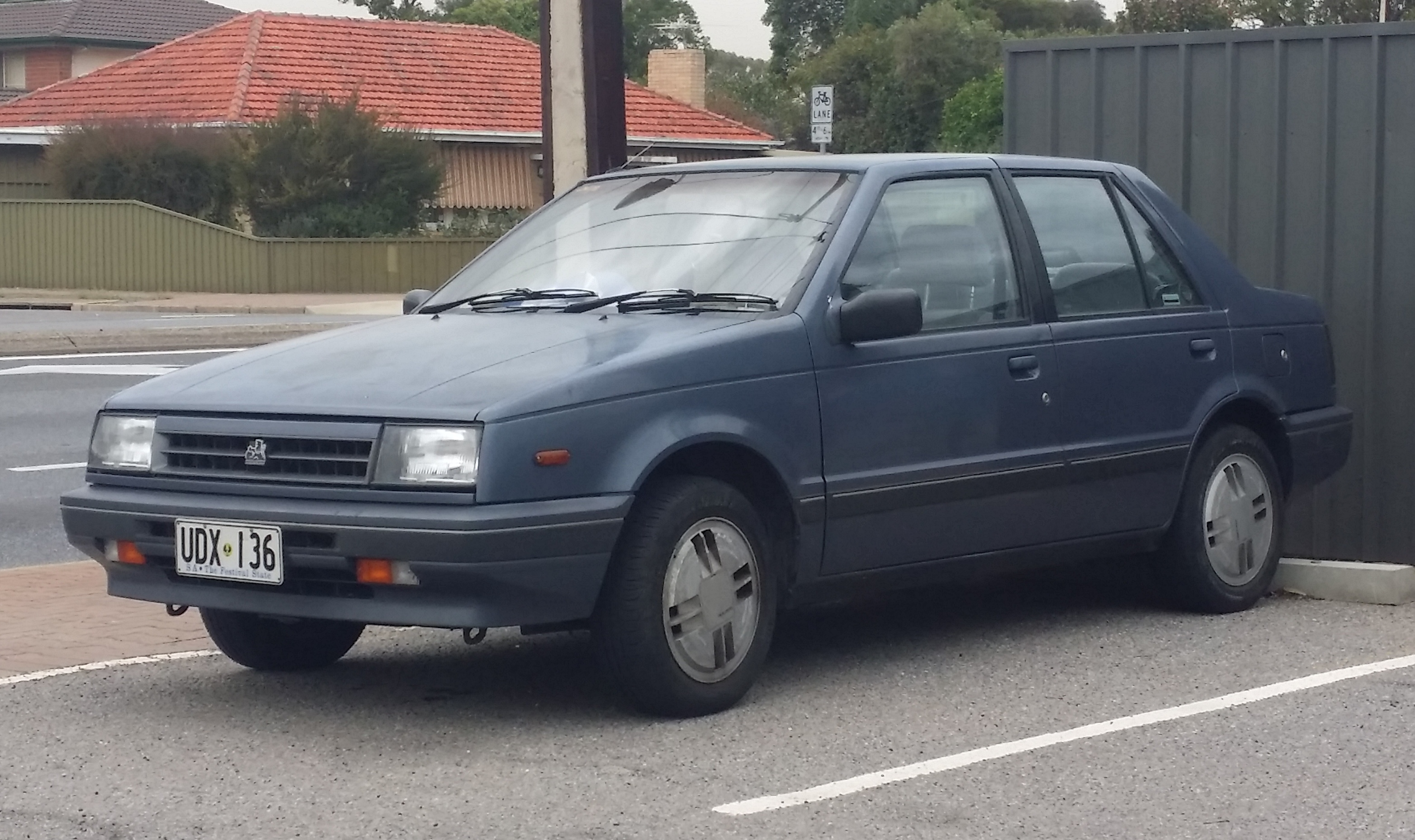
- Holden Gemini (RB) SLE sedan

Overview
- Production: April 1985 – February 1987
- Assembly: Australia: Adelaide, South Australia (Elizabeth)

Body and chassis
- Body style: 4-door sedan
- Layout: Front engine, front-wheel drive
- Platform: R-body
- Related: Chevrolet Gemini; Chevrolet Spectrum; Geo Spectrum; Isuzu Gemini; Isuzu I-Mark; Pontiac Sunburst

Powertrain
- Engine: 1471 cc 4XC1 I4
- Transmission: 4/5-speed manual 3-speed automatic

Dimensions
- Wheelbase: 2,400 mm (94.5 in)
- Length: 4,036 mm (158.9 in)
- Width: 1,600 mm (63 in)
- Height: 1,374 mm (54.1 in)

=== RB (1985–1987) ===
In May 1985, the RB series Gemini was released. Based on the front-wheel drive GM R platform, it did not sell as well as previous rear-wheel drive Geminis, with production totalling just 16,263 units. The RB Gemini was offered only in four-door sedan form, with SL/X and SL/E trim levels, as well as a fleet-only SL equipped with a 1.6 litre engine. Previous Gemini models had been built in the Holden facility at Acacia Ridge, but following that plant's closure in 1984, the totally new RB series began production in the Holden Elizabeth Plant.

The RB Gemini was discontinued in 1987 (production had ended sometime during 1986) due to poorer sales than its predecessor. The Gemini was at first sold side by side with the first generation hatch-only Holden Astra—a rebadged Nissan Pulsar (N12)—which was introduced in 1984; ultimately, the Astra effectively replaced the Gemini when its second generation, offered as both hatch and sedan, was launched in 1987.

The RB Gemini was notable for its 80-day, 200,000-kilometre (124,000 mi) endurance run from a commercial in 1985, tested by a group of Australian racers including the late Peter Brock.

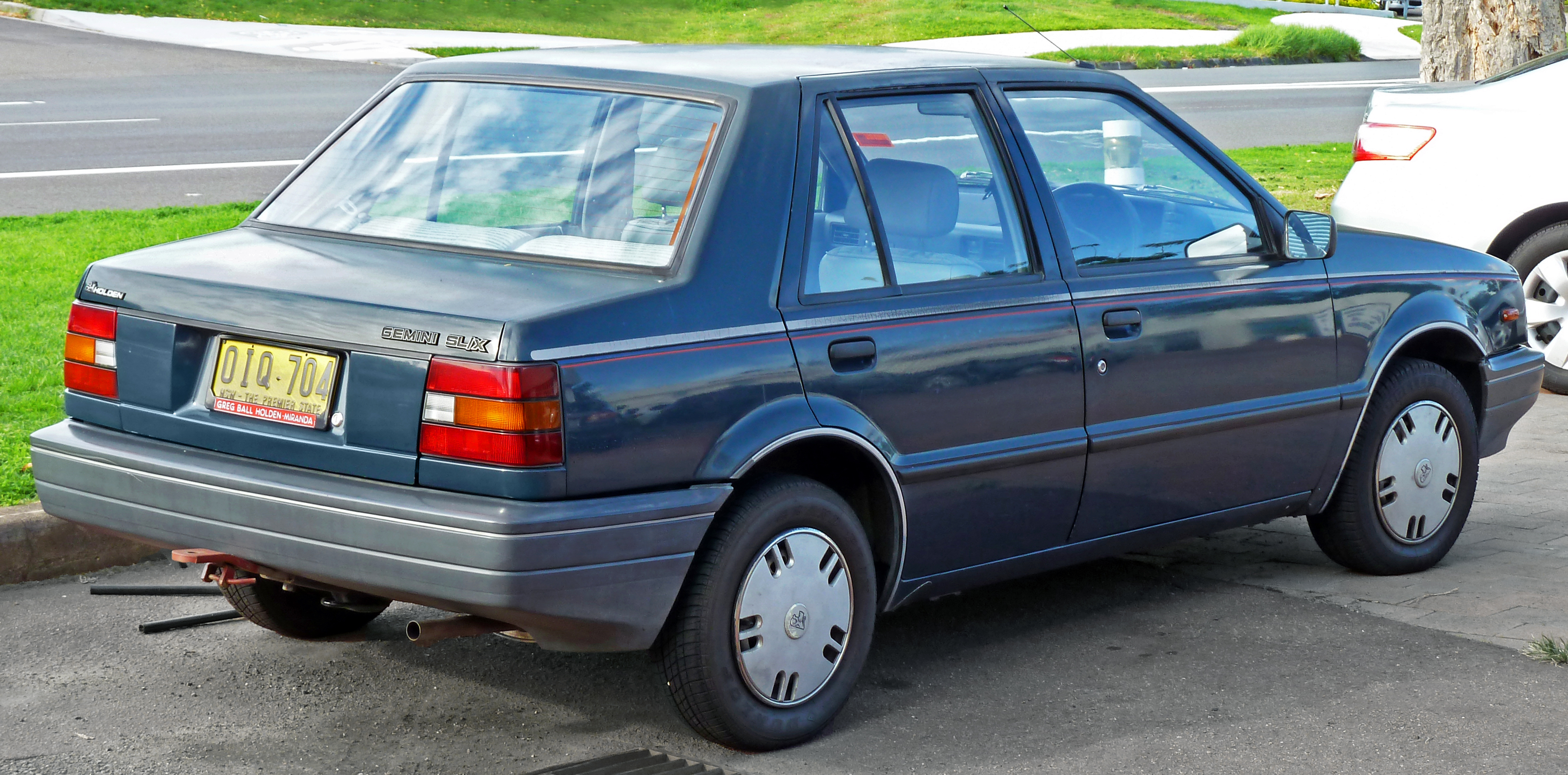
Holden Gemini (RB) SL/X sedan

== Motorsport ==
From 1977 through to 1982 Geminis raced in the Australian Touring Car Championship and the Bathurst 1000 and allied endurance motor racing. Occasionally the factory Holden Dealer Team would divert some of their efforts away from their Holden Torana and Holden Commodore racing efforts to race a Gemini, notably in 1982, but for the most part Geminis were race by privately funded teams. Initially they fared poorly in a 2000cc class but a 1600cc class was re-created in 1978 increasing their popularity. Despite the transition from Group C regulations to Group A in 1985 a few cars continued racing until 1986.

1980 saw the creation of the Gemini Racing Series in Queensland which continues to this day and is now the longest running one-make series in Australia and the second oldest globally after the British Mini series.

== Safety ==
In Australia, the 1982–1984 Holden Gemini was assessed in the "Used Car Safety Ratings" 2006 as providing "significantly worse than average" protection for its occupants in the event of a crash.

== Production figures ==
Model	Total	Cumulative total
Gemini TX	43,099	43,099
Gemini TC	17,256	60,355
Gemini TD	42,396	102,751
Gemini TE	70,690	173,318
Gemini TF	28,326	201,644
Gemini TG	24,675	226,319
Gemini RB	16,263	242,582
