= Fringe benefits tax (India) =

Indian tax, 2005–2009

The fringe benefits tax (FBT) was the tax applied to most, although not all, fringe benefits in India. A new tax was imposed on employers by India's Finance Act 2005 from the financial year commencing April 1, 2005. The fringe benefit tax was temporarily suspended in the 2009 Union budget of India by the then Finance Minister Pranab Mukherjee.

The following items were covered:

- Employer's expenses on entertainment, travel, employee welfare and accommodation. The definition of fringe benefits that have become taxable has been significantly extended. The law provides an exact list of taxable items.
- Employer's provision of employee transportation to work or a cash allowances for this purpose.
- Employer's contributions to an approved retirement plan (called a superannuation fund).
- Employee stock option plans (ESOPs) have also been brought under fringe benefits tax from the fiscal year 2007–08.
