= Take-home vehicle =

Type of company car

A company car is a vehicle which companies or organizations lease or own and which employees use for their personal and business travel. A take-home vehicle is a vehicle which can be taken home by company employees. Depending on the company, company cars may be available to all employees or just top-level personnel.

In corporate car sharing, the company shares the vehicles and allows multiple employees (rather than just one) to make use of a company car, at times when they actually need it. The vehicles are made available from a corporate car sharing pool, and shared for a fixed or flexible period of time. One shared car could replace up to 8 non-shared cars. However, car-sharing does involve additional processing and associated costs. Still, it reduces fleet-related costs over the long term and allow employees to save not only on costs but also on time.

== Attractiveness ==
There are three main reasons which explain why the provision of a company car for private use as a benefit may be attractive for both the employee and the employer.

- The first reason is that companies can supply the fringe benefit at lower costs than the employee is able to achieve on their own – and consequently pass it on to the employee.
- Secondly, the tax system may encourage the provision of cars over monetary remuneration from the perspective of both the employer and employee. Ways on how this can be encouraged include tax benefits (tax deductions and depreciation write-offs)
- Thirdly, firms may want the employee to drive in a car of certain minimum standard or have access to a suitable vehicle at all times.
- It may also benefit the employer if there is advertising/branding on the car's paintwork (or window stickers), since if the employee uses the car during the evening/weekend, it spreads advertising in public areas more than if the car was locked up in a garage during these times.

The use of company cars is widespread in some regions. For example, business registrations account for roughly 50% of all car sales in the EU, largely due to taxation rules which give companies a strong incentive to provide the benefit. The practice has been criticised by many groups who argue that the benefit encourages people to drive more (thus increasing CO_{2} emissions), reduces government tax revenues, distorts economic competition, and may work to neutralise other government programs and objectives.

== Usage by police departments ==
Police departments are among frequent participants in take-home vehicle programs, allowing officers to take home the police cars they use while on duty. It is considered to be a fringe benefit by the departments. It has been viewed by some departments as a crime-fighting tool, given its cost.

== Issues with take-home vehicles ==
=== Economic distortions ===
There is a straightforward distortion in consumer markets as consumers through tax incentives are being encouraged to consume more car services than they would have been otherwise.

There is also a substantial tax loss resulting from the subsidy.

=== Environmental damage ===
Studies have shown that the subsidy encourages consumers to buy more and bigger cars than they would choose otherwise. In many areas, fuel costs are also covered by the benefit, so that the marginal cost of driving may approach zero. In these areas consumers are encouraged to drive more frequently and farther than they otherwise would, and avoid other forms of transportation. Emissions of CO_{2} and other harmful gases are clearly higher as a result.

=== Costs to government ===
When issued by a government agency, concern has been brought up by citizens and advocates over taxpayer money used to fund take-home vehicles. This has led some cities to cutting or reducing the number of employees to whom vehicles are offered.

In Sacramento, California, the issuing of take-home vehicles has come under scrutiny as the city has faced a budget deficit.

In the city of Baltimore, the use of take-home vehicles by city employees has been questioned due to the distance that city employees drive them to their homes. It was determined in a report that two-thirds of city employees drive their vehicles outside city limits, some more than 100 mi (160 km) from the city, and the cost to taxpayers, which included fuel, was high. Baltimore's former mayor Sheila Dixon was also criticized for having three tax-funded take-home vehicles parked at her house. She defended herself by saying she might need the vehicles if there were an emergency.

In Dallas, the city was having trouble obtaining data in attempting to determine the cost of take-home vehicles to taxpayers.

The city of Los Angeles was criticized for issuing take-home vehicles to utility employees while raising rates to customers, though the city stated it would be a minuscule part of the budget.

The city of Evansville, Indiana reduced the number of take-home vehicles offered to city employees, but allowed public safety employees to keep theirs.

== See also ==
- Cycling and public transport: alternatives to privately owned motorized vehicles
- Fleet vehicle
- Remote work
- Smart mobility: component of the European Green Deal
- Traffic congestion
- Criticism of vehicle-to-grid
