= Employee benefits =

Non-wage compensation provided to employees in addition to normal wages or salaries

Employee benefits and benefits in kind (especially in British English), also called fringe benefits, perquisites, or perks, include various types of non-wage compensation provided to an employee by an employer in addition to their normal wage or salary. Instances where an employee exchanges (cash) wages for some other form of benefit is generally referred to as a "salary packaging" or "salary exchange" arrangement. In most countries, most kinds of employee benefits are taxable to at least some degree. Examples of these benefits include: housing (employer-provided or employer-paid) furnished or not, with or without free utilities; group insurance (health, dental, life, etc.); disability income protection; retirement benefits; daycare; tuition reimbursement; sick leave; vacation (paid and unpaid); social security; profit sharing; employer student loan contributions; conveyancing; long service leave; domestic help (servants); and other specialized benefits.

The purpose of employee benefits is to increase the economic security of staff members, and in doing so, improve worker retention across the organization. As such, it is one component of reward management. Colloquially, "perks" are those benefits of a more discretionary nature. Often, perks are given to employees who are doing notably well or have seniority. Common perks are take-home vehicles, hotel stays, free refreshments, leisure activities on work time (golf, etc.), stationery, allowances for lunch, and—when multiple choices exist—first choice of such things as job assignments and vacation scheduling. They may also be given first chance at job promotions when vacancies exist. Some employers have made particular efforts to help their employees during the cost-of-living crisis of the 2020s.

== Managerial and employee perspectives ==
The Bureau of Labor Statistics defines employee benefits as non-wage compensation, while the International Accounting Standards Board includes "are all forms of consideration given by an entity in exchange for service rendered by employees or for the termination of employment" except share-based payments.

Managers tend to view compensation and benefits in terms of their ability to attract and retain employees, as well as in terms of their ability to motivate them.

Employees – along with potential employees – tend to view benefits that are mandated by regulation differently from benefits that are discretionary, that is, those that are not mandated but are simply designed to make a compensation package more attractive. Benefits that are mandated are thought of as creating employee rights or entitlements, while discretionary benefits are intended to inspire employee loyalty and increase job satisfaction.

== Canada ==
Employee benefits in Canada usually refer to employer sponsored life, disability, health, and dental plans. Such group insurance plans are a top-up to existing provincial coverage. An employer provided group insurance plan is coordinated with the provincial plan in the respective province or territory, therefore an employee covered by such a plan must be covered by the provincial plan first. The life, accidental death and dismemberment and disability insurance component is an employee benefit only. Some plans provide a minimal dependent life insurance benefit as well. The healthcare plan may include any of the following: hospital room upgrades (Semi-Private or Private), medical services/supplies and equipment, travel medical (60 or 90 days per trip), registered therapists and practitioners (i.e. physiotherapists, acupuncturists, chiropractors, etc.), prescription requiring drugs, vision (eye exams, contacts/lenses), and Employee Assistance Programs. The dental plan usually includes Basic Dental (cleanings, fillings, root canals), Major Dental (crowns, bridges, dentures) or Orthodontics (braces).

Other than the employer sponsored health benefits described above, the next most common employee benefits are group savings plans (Group RRSPs and Group Profit Sharing Plans), which have tax and growth advantages to individual saving plans.

== France ==
During the cost-of-living crisis of the 2020s, multinational car manufacturer Stellantis has paid its staff in France a one-off cash bonus to help with living costs.

== India ==
Regulatory reforms implemented in 2025 have impacted on the operation of employee benefits.

== United States ==
Employee benefits in the United States include relocation assistance; medical, prescription, vision and dental plans; health and dependent care flexible spending accounts; retirement benefit plans (pension, 401(k), 403(b)); group term life insurance and accidental death and dismemberment insurance plans; income protection plans (also known as disability protection plans); long-term care insurance plans; legal assistance plans; medical second opinion programs, adoption assistance; child care benefits and transportation benefits; paid time off (PTO) in the form of vacation and sick pay. Benefits may also include formal or informal employee discount programs that grant workers access to specialized offerings from local and regional vendors (like movies and theme park tickets, wellness programs, discounted shopping, hotels and resorts, and so on).

Employers that offer these types of work-life perks seek to raise employee satisfaction, corporate loyalty, and worker retention by providing valuable benefits that go beyond a base salary figure. Fringe benefits are also thought of as the costs of retaining employees other than base salary. The term "fringe benefits" was coined by the War Labor Board during World War II to describe the various indirect benefits which industry had devised to attract and retain labor when direct wage increases were prohibited.

Some fringe benefits (for example, accident and health plans, and group-term life insurance coverage up to $50,000) may be excluded from the employee's gross income and, therefore, are not subject to federal income tax in the United States. Some function as tax shelters (for example, flexible spending, 401(k), or 403(b) accounts). These benefit rates often change from year to year and are typically calculated using fixed percentages that vary depending on the employee’s classification.

Normally, employer-provided benefits are tax-deductible to the employer and non-taxable to the employee. The exception to the general rule includes certain executive benefits (e.g. golden handshake and golden parachute plans) or those that exceed federal or state tax-exemption standards.

American corporations may also offer cafeteria plans to their employees. These plans offer a menu and level of benefits for employees to choose from. In most instances, these plans are funded by both the employees and by the employer(s). The portion paid by employees is deducted from their gross pay before federal and state taxes are applied. Some benefits would still be subject to the Federal Insurance Contributions Act tax (FICA), such as 401(k) and 403(b) contributions; however, health premiums, some life premiums, and contributions to flexible spending accounts are exempt from FICA.

If certain conditions are met, employer provided meals and lodging may be excluded from an employee's gross income. If meals are furnished (1) by the employer; (2) for the employer's convenience; and (3) provided on the business premises of the employer they may be excluded from the employee's gross income per section 119(a). In addition, lodging furnished by the employer for its convenience on the business premise of the employer (which the employee is required to accept as a condition of employment) is also excluded from gross income. Importantly, section 119(a) only applies to meals or lodging furnished "in kind". Therefore, cash allowances for meals or lodging received by an employee are included in gross income.

Qualified disaster relief payments made for an employee during a national disaster are not taxable income to the employee. The payments must be reasonable and necessary personal, family, living, or funeral expenses that have been incurred as a result of a national disaster. Eligible expenses include medical expenses, childcare and tutoring expenses due to school closings, internet, and telephone expenses. Replacement of lost income or lost wages are not eligible.

Employee benefits provided through ERISA (Employee Retirement Income Security Act) are not subject to state-level insurance regulation like most insurance contracts, but employee benefit products provided through insurance contracts are regulated at the state level. However, ERISA does not generally apply to plans by governmental entities, churches for their employees, and some other situations.

Under the Obamacare or ACA's Employer Shared Responsibility provisions, certain employers, known as applicable large employers are required to offer minimum essential coverage that is affordable to their full-time employees or else make the employer shared responsibility payment to the IRS.

Private firms in the US have come up with certain unusual perquisites.

In the United States paid time off, in the form of vacation days or sick days, is not required by federal or state law. The Bureau of Labor Statistics reported that in March 2025, 72 percent of private-industry workers had access to employer-sponsored medical care plans and 45 percent participated. Retirement benefits were available to 72 percent of private-industry workers. Access varied by establishment size: 59 percent at establishments with fewer than 100 workers, 86 percent at establishments with 100 to 499 workers, and 90 percent at establishments with 500 or more workers.

The term perk-cession was coined in a 2023 article by the Wall Street Journal as a portmanteau of perk and recession to describe the reduction of employee benefits and workplace amenities. Perk-cessions are made to enable a business to focus on efficiency and cost. Perk-cessions are not well received by employees, negatively impacting company culture.

== United Kingdom ==
In the United Kingdom, employee benefits are categorised by three terms: flexible benefits (flex) and flexible benefits packages, voluntary benefits and core benefits.

- "Core benefits" is the term given to benefits which all staff enjoy, such as pension, life insurance, income protection, and holiday. Employees may be unable to remove these benefits, depending on individual employers' preferences.
- Flexible benefits, often called a "flex scheme", allow employees to choose how a proportion of their remuneration is paid or they are given a benefits budget by their employer to spend. Currently around a third of UK employers operate such a scheme. How flexible benefits schemes are structured has remained fairly consistent over the years, although the definition of flex has changed quite a lot since it first arrived in the UK in the 1980s. When flex first emerged, it was run as a formal scheme for a set contract period, through which employees could opt in and out of a selection of employer-paid benefits, select employee-paid benefits, or take the cash. In recent years increasing numbers of UK companies have used the tax and national insurance savings gained through the implementation of salary sacrifice benefits to fund the implementation of flexible benefits. In a salary sacrifice arrangement an employee gives up the right to part of the cash remuneration due under their contract of employment. Usually the sacrifice is made in return for the employer's agreement to provide them with some form of non-cash benefit. The most popular types of salary sacrifice benefits include childcare vouchers and pensions.

A number of external consultancies exist that enable organisations to manage flex packages centred around the provision of an Intranet or Extranet website where employees can view their current flexible benefit status and make changes to their package. Adoption of flexible benefits has grown considerably, with 62% of employers in a 2012 survey offering a flexible benefit package and a further 21% planning to do so in the future. This has coincided with increased employee access to the internet and studies suggesting that employee engagement can be boosted by their successful adoption.

- "Voluntary benefits" is the name given to a collection of benefits that employees choose to opt-in for and pay for personally, although as with flex plans, many employers make use of salary sacrifice schemes where the employee reduces their salary in exchange for the employer paying for the perk. These tend to include benefits such as the government-backed (and therefore tax-efficient) cycle to work scheme, pension contributions and childcare vouchers and also specially arranged discounts on retail and leisure vouchers, gym membership and discounts at local shops and restaurants. These can be run in-house or arranged by an external employee benefits consultant. Companies may offer price reductions to employees who purchase their own company's goods and services.

A number of central government departments, arms length public bodies and other public sector organisations offer employee benefits, to the extent that the Government Commercial Agency operates a scheme to aggregate demand for third party provision in this field and an online employee benefits platform.

== Fringe benefits tax ==
In a number of countries (e.g., Australia, New Zealand and Pakistan), "fringe benefits" are subject to the Fringe Benefits Tax (FBT), which applies to most, although not all, fringe benefits. In India, the fringe benefits tax was abolished in 2009.

In the United States, employer-sponsored health insurance was considered taxable income until 1954.

== Disadvantages ==
In the event of financial hardship, companies may cease or place a moratorium on certain employee benefits that are deemed too costly, informally known as a perk-cession. Such actions are usually at the damage of employee morale/culture, and may result in employee turnover (which may further exacerbate financial hardships in addition to other cost-cutting measures such as layoffs).

In the UK, benefits are often taxed at the individual's normal tax rate, which can prove expensive if there is no financial advantage to the individual from the benefit.

The UK system of state pension provision is dependent upon the payment of National Insurance Contributions. Salary exchange schemes result in reduced payments and so are may reduce the state benefits, most notably the State Second Pension.

== See also ==
- Benefit incidence
- Novated lease
- Income in kind
