= Fringe benefits tax (Australia) =

Australian tax system

Quarterly Fringe Benefits Tax revenue ($millions) since 1986

The fringe benefits tax (FBT) is a tax applied within the Australian tax system by the Australian Taxation Office. The tax is levied on most non-cash benefits that an employer provides "in respect of employment." The tax is levied on the employer, not the employee, and will be levied irrespective of whether the benefit is provided directly to the employee or to an associate of the employee.

The tax was first imposed in 1986 and the operation of the tax is described by the Fringe Benefits Tax Assessment Act 1986.

== Fringe benefits ==
A fringe benefit is an extra benefit supplementing an employee's monetary wage or salary. For example: A company car, private health care, fitness club membership, phone or internet service reimbursement, etc. In Australia, a fringe benefit is a payment to an employee that is not considered part of the employee's income. Fringe benefits can be given to current, former, or future employees or a member of their family, a trustee, or a director. The tax is paid by the employer only, and is not expected to be paid by the employee.

There are several specific 'types' of benefits listed in the legislation, including car fringe benefits, loan fringe benefits, housing fringe benefits and others. For each fringe benefit type, one or more methods is prescribed for determining the taxable value of the benefit.

== Calculation of the tax payable ==
FBT tax rates
Year ending	Rate
Mar 2014	46.5%
Mar 2015	47%
Mar 2016	49%
Mar 2017	49%
Mar 2018	47%
Mar 2019	47%
Mar 2020	47%
Mar 2021	47%
Mar 2022	47%
Mar 2023	47%

For the FBT year ending 31 March 2015, Fringe Benefits Tax will be payable by the employer at a rate of 47%, which represents the highest marginal income tax rate (45%), plus the Medicare levy as increased on 1 July 2014 (2%). This rate is applied to the "grossed up" taxable value of all the benefits given to employees less any contribution made by the employee. However, some benefits are exempt from FBT and others are only taxed if the value exceeds the threshold amount.

Benefits exempt from FBT include:

- Salary and wages (Allowance)
- Remote area housing
- Living away from home allowances (partly exempt)
- Employee relocation expenses
- Superannuation (retirement/private pension contributions)
- Minor benefits (less than $300 in value) incurred infrequently and irregularly;
- Work-related items:
  - protective clothing
  - tools of trade
  - briefcases
  - mobile phones
  - laptops and similar portable digital assistants, including software, portable printers, calculators, electronic diaries.
- Certain benefits not normally exempt can be so if provided by a public benevolent institution (e.g. charities and public/non-profit hospitals), up to a certain value.

No FBT is payable on exempt benefits and an employee is not required to make any contribution to the employer for these benefits. They are also exempt from income tax in the hands of the employee. They are not included in reportable fringe benefits.

- Note: When a benefit is exempt, it does not mean it is not a FBT, instead, it is interpreted as there is 0% FBT liability.

Special rules apply to employer-provided motor vehicles. Either of two methods may be used. The statutory formula method is the more popular one because it requires less record-keeping. It provides lower FBT rates as vehicle usage increases and as vehicle capital value decreases.

- Note: Fringe Benefit on motor vehicles only arises when the motor vehicle is provided to an employee, to the extent that is used for private purpose(e.g: holiday car). However, apportionment rule may apply when an employee uses the motor vehicle for dual purposes, such as work related activity and private use, the FBT liability on the employer will therefore be the portion that is for private use.

On 13 May 2008, the FBT exemption for laptops or other technology items was removed. Since 1995 rules had allowed high-salaried individuals to get a laptop computer almost for nothing by purchasing such equipment via salary packaging. As the equipment was exempt from FBT, the employee would buy the equipment by salary sacrifice thereby reducing their income, a saving of up to 46.5% in tax. The employee could then claim depreciation on the equipment, usually over a three-year period, on their personal tax return. If the equipment was sold as second-hand at the end of that period, it was even possible to make a profit on the deal. From May 2008, the FBT exemption was removed for laptops or other technology items under salary packaging rules. The employee also could no longer claim the depreciation.

== Changes in 2015 ==
The Federal Government delivered its 2015-16 Budget on 12 May 2015. The Budget included proposed changes to the Meal Entertainment and Holiday Accommodation/Venue Hire benefits with an introduction of an annual Capped amount. Therefore, the proposed changes apply to employees of Public Hospitals and not-for-profit FBT-exempt employers.

Proposed changes are to be effective from 1 April 2016, where these salary packaging exempt benefits will be capped at $2,550 per FBT year ($5,000 grossed up cap divided by the type 2 gross-up rate of 1.9608).

== Salary packaging ==
Some employers offer to provide their employees fringe benefits in place of part of their salary in an arrangement called salary packaging. Such arrangements, if available, can be an effective way of reducing the employee's income tax by reducing salary. Though the employer is the party liable to pay FBT, many employers will recover the FBT liability from the employee, usually as part of the packaging arrangement.

== Reportable fringe benefits ==
Although FBT is paid by the employer, the benefits received by the employee must also be reported by the employer on the employee's PAYG payment summary (formerly known as group certificate) as reportable fringe benefits if the benefit exceeds $2,000. While the reportable fringe benefits are shown on the PAYG payment summary and on the employee's tax return, they are not counted in the employee's income subject to income tax. They are however included in means (income) testing.

The amount reported is the "grossed-up" taxable value of benefits received by the employee or an employee's associate (e.g., a relative) in the FBT year which ends on 31 March of each year.

== See also ==
- Novated lease
- Salary packaging
- Taxation in Australia
